= 2012 Melbourne Cup =

- Melbourne Cup
- Location: Flemington Racecourse; Melbourne, Australia
- Date: 6 November 2012
- Winning horse: Green Moon
- Starting price: $20
- Jockey: Brett Prebble
- Trainer: Robert Hickmott
- Surface: Grass
- Attendance: 106,162

Glencadam Gold had the lead, here's Mourayan after him and Green Moon is coming on, Kelinni joining in in the middle too, they were clear too of Fiorente starting to work home and then came Jakkalberry. Glencadam Gold is grabbed by Green Moon, Green Moon dashed to the lead in the Melbourne Cup followed by Kelinni, Fiorente starting to come home. Green Moon out in front for Brett Prebble he's two lengths clear from Fiorente and Green Moon wins the Melbourne Cup by a length and a half Fiorente, Jakkalberry's runs third.

— Commentator Greg Miles describes the climax of the race

The 2012 Emirates Melbourne Cup was the 152nd running of the Melbourne Cup, Australia's most prestigious Thoroughbred horse race. The race, held on Tuesday, 6 November 2012, at Flemington Racecourse (in Melbourne, Victoria), was won by Green Moon, ridden by jockey Brett Prebble, trained by Robert Hickmott, and owned by businessman Lloyd Williams.

The race was attended by the Prince of Wales and his wife the Duchess of Cornwall (Charles and Camilla), with Camilla presenting the cup to the winner of the race.

== Prize money ==
The prize money for the race, held over a distance of 3,200 metres, was A$6.2 million, increased from $6.175 million the previous year. The prize money is split between the first ten runners, with first place taking $3.6 million. The actual cup awarded to the winner of the race (included in the value of the prize money) is valued at $175,000. The race was attended by approximately 106,000 people.

== Field ==
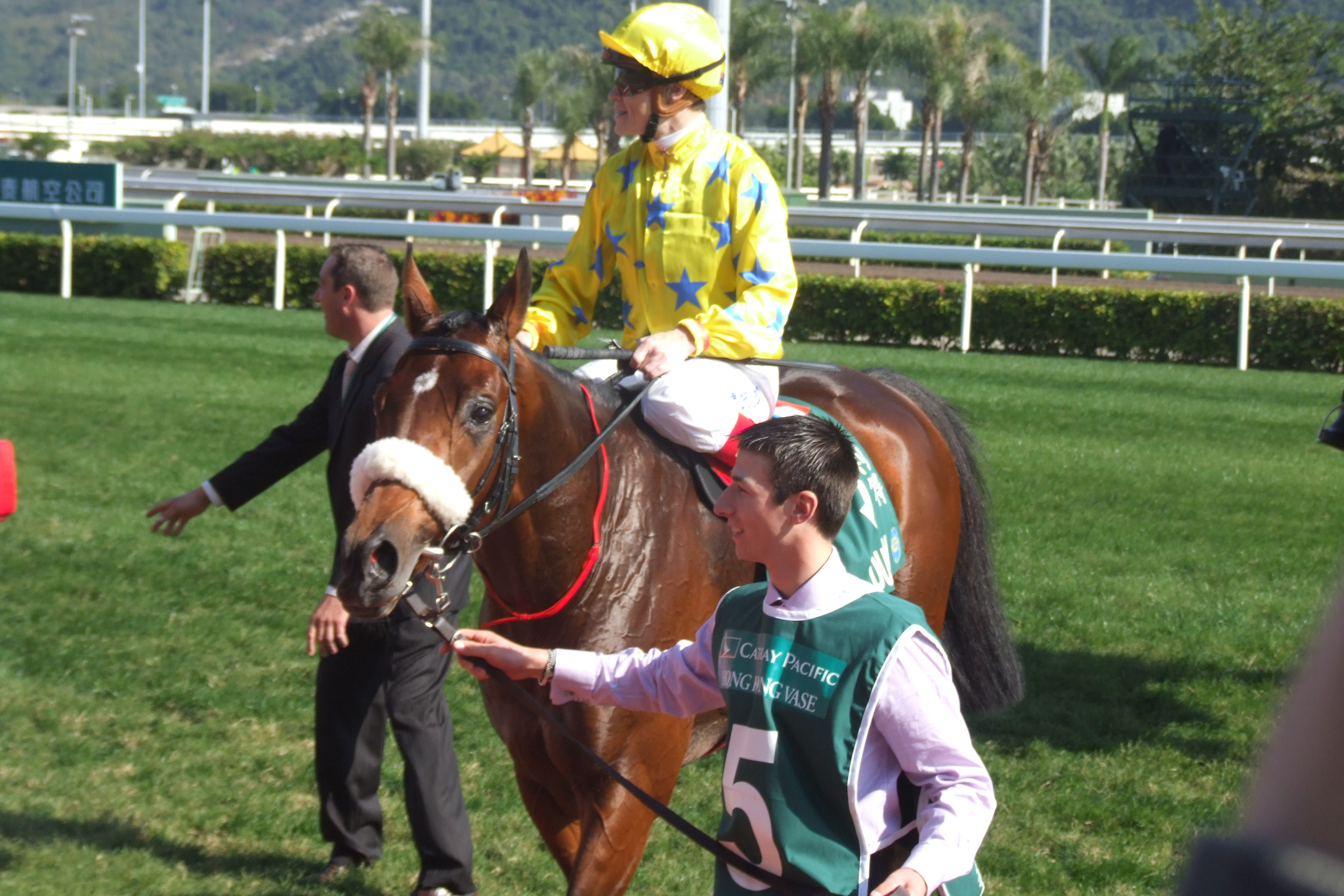
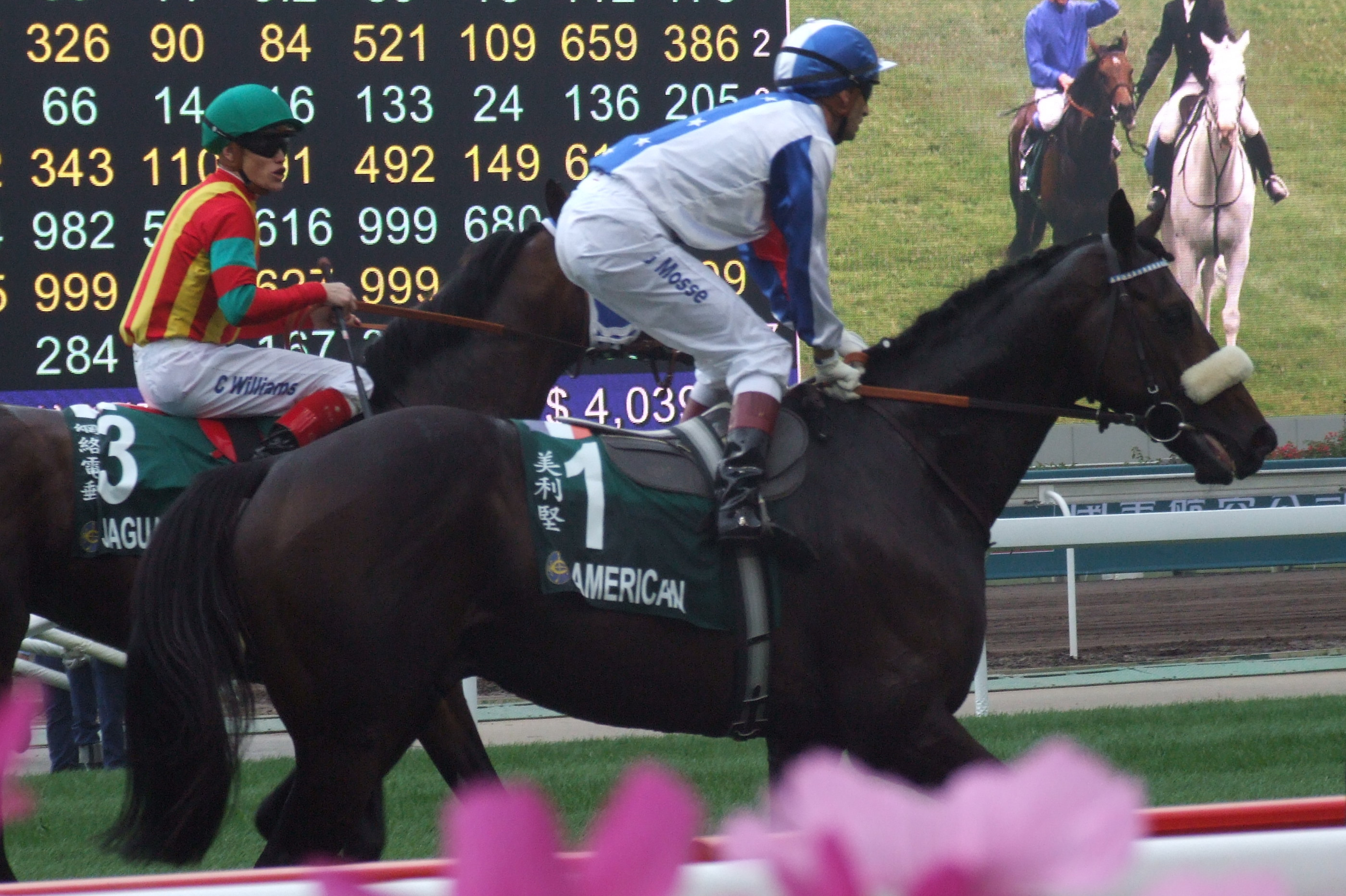
Dunaden (top) and Americain (below), both previous winners, were considered favourites to win the race, but placed 14th and 11th, respectively.

The field for the 2012 Melbourne Cup consisted of 24 horses, with the barrier draw conducted three days prior to the race, on the day of the running of the Victoria Derby. Going into the race, favourites included Americain (winner of the 2010 race), Dunaden (winner of the 2011 race), and Red Cadeaux (second in the 2011 race), with Dunaden having won the 2012 Caulfield Cup, considered an important lead-up race. With Glencadam Gold leading for most of the race, Green Moon pulled clear in the final straight, and eventually won in 3 minutes, 20.45 seconds, with Fiorente a length behind in second place, and Jakkalberry in third. Ethiopia finished last, 63 lengths behind the winner, having injured a tendon during the race. Green Moon's win was the first in the cup for both the horse's jockey, Brett Prebble, and trainer, Robert Hickmott, and the fourth win overall for the owner, Lloyd Williams, who thus became the equal most successful owner in the race's history. The win was later described as "a major upset", with Green Moon having been priced up to $22.50 for a win and $7.40 for a place.

Radio host and comedian Hamish Blake confidently predicted on Hamish & Andy that Green Moon would win after having a dream about "green" and "horses". In 1996, Blake had dreamed about the number 5 and surmised Saintly would win (because of its number in the race), which it did.

Except where otherwise listed, horses are trained in Australia:

Saddle cloth	Horse	Trainer	Jockey	Weight	Barrier	Placing
1	Dunaden (IRE)	Mikel Delzangles (FR)	Craig Williams	59 kg	16	14th
2	Americain (USA)	Alain de Royer-Dupré (FR)	Damien Oliver	58 kg	12	11th
3	Jakkalberry (IRE)	Marco Botti (UK)	Colm O'Donoghue (IRE)	55.5 kg	19	3rd
4	Red Cadeaux (GB)	Ed Dunlop (UK)	Michael Rodd	55.5 kg	18	8th
5	Winchester (USA)	John Sadler	Jamie Mott	55.5 kg	22	17th
6	Voila Ici (IRE)	Peter Moody	Vlad Duric	55 kg	13	13th
7	Cavalryman (GB)	Saeed bin Suroor (UAE)	Frankie Dettori (ITA)	54 kg	6	12th
8	Mount Athos (IRE)	Luca Cumani (UK)	Ryan Moore (UK)	54 kg	8	5th
9	Sanagas (GER)	Bart Cummings	Nicholas Hall	54 kg	4	18th
10	Ethiopia	Pat Carey	Rhys McLeod	54 kg	14	24th
11	Fiorente (IRE)	Gai Waterhouse	James McDonald (NZ)	53.5 kg	2	2nd
12	Galileo's Choice (IRE)	Dermot Weld (IRE)	Pat Smullen (IRE)	53.5 kg	11	20th
13	Glencadam Gold (IRE)	Gai Waterhouse	Tommy Berry	53.5 kg	7	6th
14	Green Moon (IRE)	Robert Hickmott	Brett Prebble	53.5 kg	5	1st
15	Maluckyday (NZ)	Michael, Wayne & John Hawkes	Jim Cassidy (NZ)	53.5 kg	9	19th
16	Mourayan (IRE)	Robert Hickmott	Hugh Bowman	53.5 kg	3	7th
17	My Quest For Peace (IRE)	Luca Cumani (UK)	Corey Brown	53.5 kg	1	10th
18	Niwot	Michael, Wayne & John Hawkes	Dwayne Dunn	53.5 kg	15	15th
19	Tac De Boistron (FR)	Michael Kent	Olivier Doleuze (FR)	53.5 kg	21	23rd
20	Lights of Heaven (NZ)	Peter Moody	Luke Nolen	53 kg	17	16th
21	Precedence (NZ)	Bart Cummings	Blake Shinn	53 kg	20	9th
22	Unusual Suspect (USA)	Michael Kent	Glyn Schofield	53 kg	23	21st
23	Zabeelionaire (NZ)	Leon Corstens	Craig Newitt	52 kg	24	22nd
24	Kelinni (IRE)	Chris Waller	Glen Boss	51 kg	10	4th

== See also ==
- List of Melbourne Cup winners
