= 2013 Melbourne Cup =

- Melbourne Cup
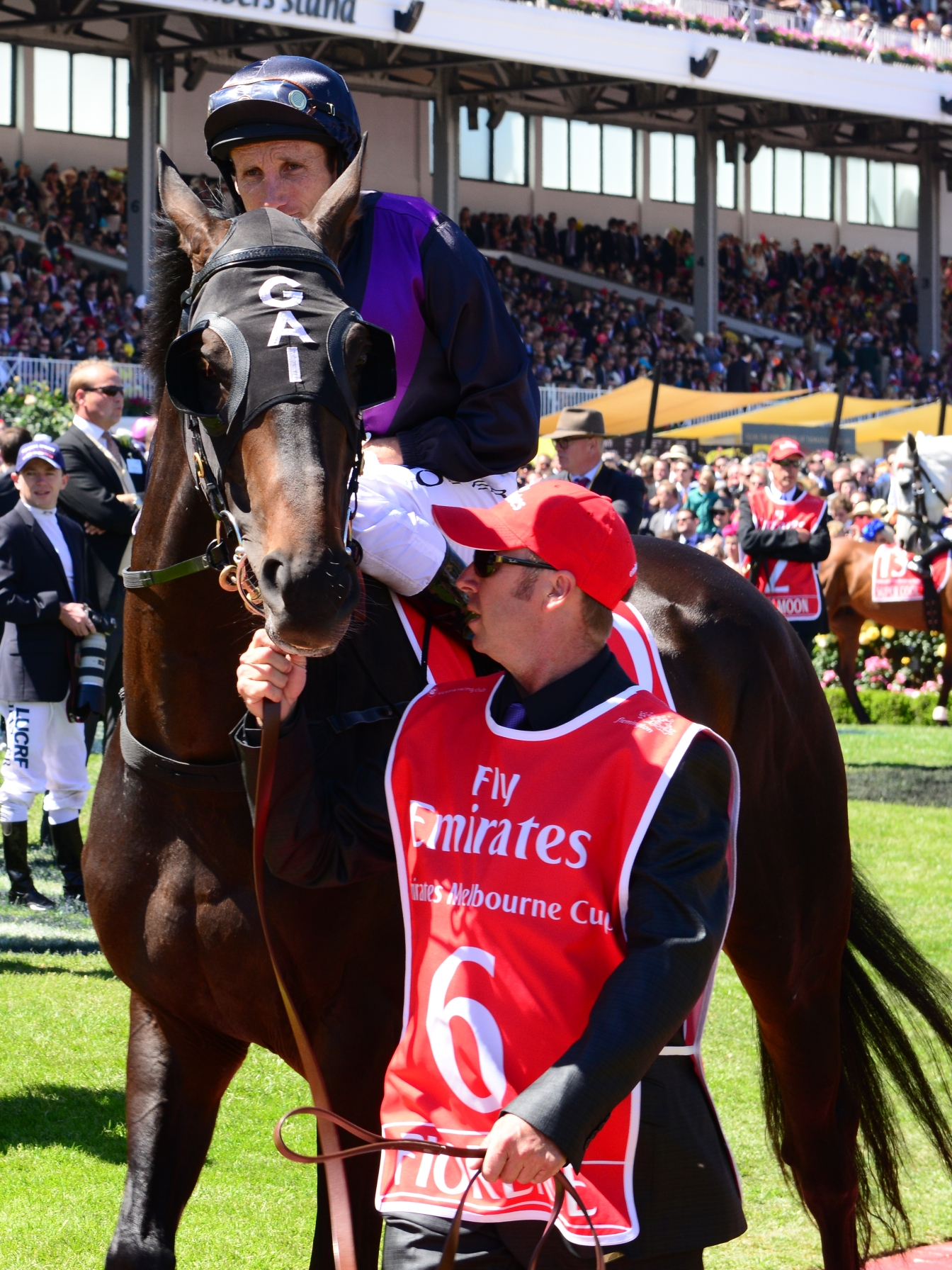
- Fiorente, the winner of the race, pictured with jockey Damien Oliver prior to the running of the race
- Location: Flemington Racecourse; Melbourne, Australia
- Date: 5 November 2013
- Winning horse: Fiorente
- Starting price: $7
- Jockey: Damien Oliver
- Trainer: Gai Waterhouse
- Surface: Grass
- Attendance: 104,169

The 2013 Emirates Melbourne Cup was the 153rd running of the Melbourne Cup, Australia's most prestigious Thoroughbred horse race. The race, held on 5 November 2013, at Flemington Racecourse in Melbourne, Victoria, was won by Fiorente. The horse, owned by Andrew Roberts and Barry Pang, was bred in Ireland, trained in Australia by Gai Waterhouse, and ridden by jockey Damien Oliver. It was Oliver's third victory in the event, after previous wins in 1995 and 2002, and his first start after a ten-month ban for a betting offence. Waterhouse, the daughter of Tommy J. Smith, who trained winners in 1955 and 1981, became the first Australian woman to train a winner.

Red Cadeaux tackled by Fiorente, Mount Athos kicking back on the inside. It's Fiorente in front on the outside with Red Cadeaux, Fiorente and Red Cadeaux from Mount Athos. Fiorente just in front of Red Cadeaux who's coming back. Fiorente by a neck, Oliver's lifting him and Fiorente won the Melbourne Cup for Gai!

— Commentator Greg Miles describes the climax of the race

The race was attended by 104,169 people—the Victoria Racing Club (VRC) had capped attendance at 110,000 for the Melbourne Cup and the Victoria Derby, but this mark was not reached at either race. Approximately A$90.6 million was wagered on the race through Totalisator Agency Boards in Victoria and New South Wales, with another $37.5 million wagered through equivalent agencies in Queensland, South Australia, and Tasmania.

== Field ==
The field for the 2013 Melbourne Cup consisted of 24 horses, with the barrier draw conducted three days prior to the race, on the day of the running of the Victoria Derby. Pre-race favourite Fiorente won the race by three-quarters of a length over Red Cadeaux who finished 1 1/2 lengths ahead of Mount Athos. He was the first favourite to win the race since Makybe Diva in 2005, and the first horse since Empire Rose in 1988 to win the race after placing second the previous year. Tres Blue and Dunaden, the winner of the 2011 race, both received banned medical treatment on the day of the race, but were both allowed to start, although a stewards' enquiry is planned.

Except where otherwise listed, horses are trained in Australia:

Saddle cloth	Horse	Trainer	Jockey	Weight	Barrier	Placing
1	Dunaden (IRE)	Mikel Delzangles (FR)	Jamie Spencer	58.5 kg	1	11th
2	Green Moon	Robert Hickmott	Brett Prebble	57.5 kg	10	21st
3	Red Cadeaux	Ed Dunlop (ENG)	Gérald Mossé	56.5 kg	23	2nd
4	Sea Moon	Robert Hickmott	Steven Arnold	56.5 kg	7	13th
5	Brown Panther	Tom Dascombe (ENG)	Richard Kingscote	55 kg	6	8th
6	Fiorente	Gai Waterhouse	Damien Oliver	55 kg	5	1st
7	Foreteller	Chris Waller	Craig Newitt	55 kg	15	17th
8	Dandino	Marco Botti (ENG)	Ryan Moore	54.5 kg	4	5th
9	Ethiopia	Pat Carey	Rhys McLeod	54.5 kg	14	7th
10	Fawkner	Robert Hickmott	Nick Hall	54.5 kg	8	6th
11	Mourayan	Robert Hickmott	Brenton Avdulla	54.5 kg	19	15th
12	Seville	Robert Hickmott	Hugh Bowman	54.5 kg	9	12th
13	Super Cool	Mark Kavanagh	Corey Brown	54.5 kg	13	9th
14	Masked Marvel	Robert Hickmott	Michael Rodd	54 kg	2	18th
15	Mount Athos	Luca Cumani (ENG)	Craig Williams	54 kg	22	3rd
16	Royal Empire	Saeed bin Suroor (ENG)	Kerrin McEvoy	54 kg	11	14th
17	Voleuse De Coeurs	Michael Moroney	James McDonald	54 kg	21	10th
18	Hawkspur	Chris Waller	Jim Cassidy	53.5 kg	18	20th
19	Simenon	Willie Mullins (IRE)	Richard Hughes	53.5 kg	12	4th
20	Ibicenco	Peter Moody	Luke Nolen	53 kg	17	16th
21	Verema	Alain de Royer-Dupré (FRA)	Christophe Lemaire	53 kg	3	24th (Did not survive)
22	Dear Demi	Clarry Conners	Chris Munce	51 kg	16	19th
23	Tres Blue	Gai Waterhouse	Tommy Berry	51 kg	20	22nd
24	Ruscello	Ed Walker (ENG)	Chad Schofield	50 kg	24	23rd

== Fatalities ==
After the race, the mare Verema was euthanised, having broken her cannon bone midway through the race.

== See also ==
- List of Melbourne Cup winners
