= Zipping Classic =

Horse race in Melbourne, Victoria, Australia

Zipping Classic registered as the MRC Sandown Classic
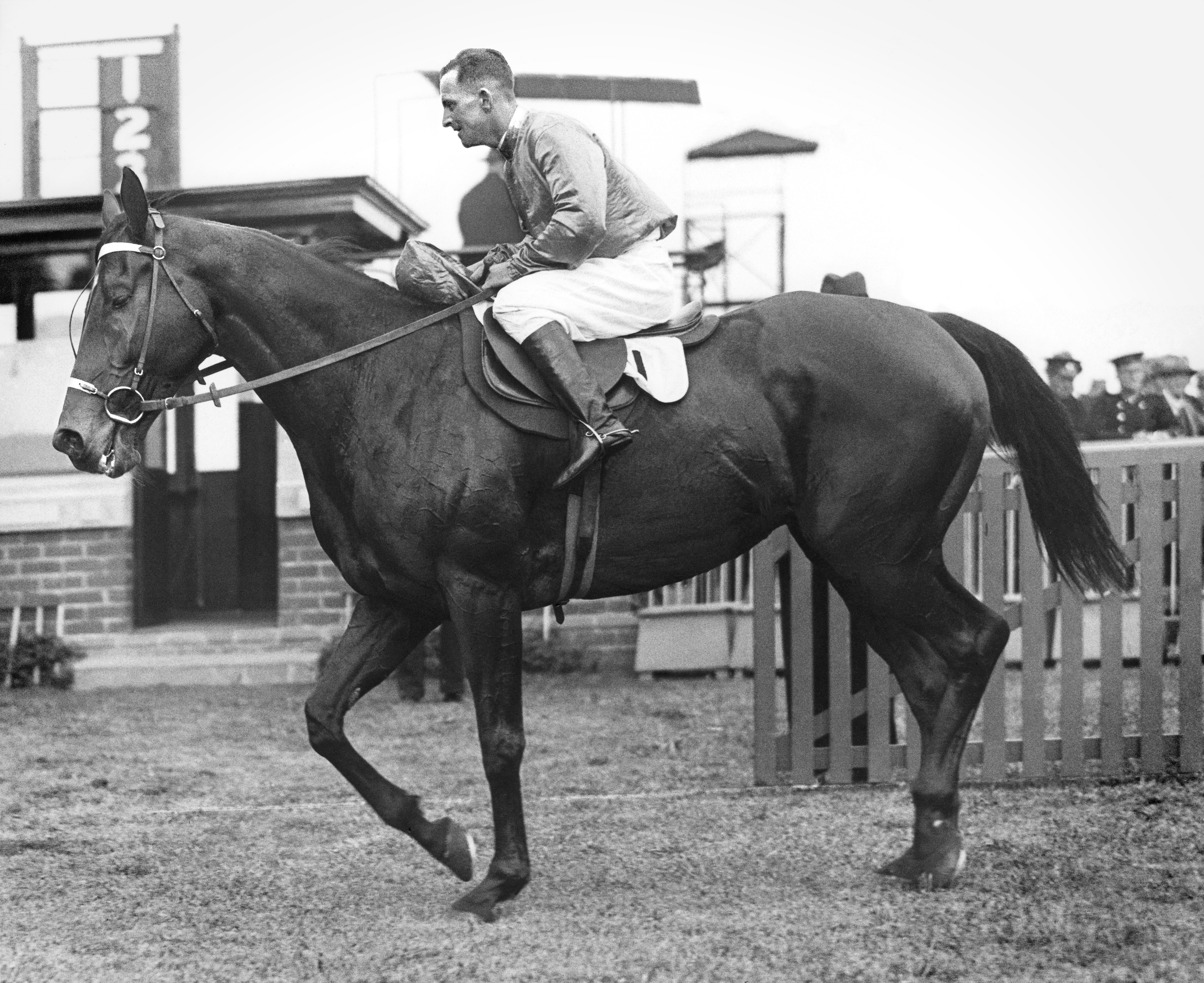
- Amounis, 1928 Williamstown Cup winner
- Class: Group 2
- Location: Sandown Racecourse, Melbourne, Australia
- Inaugurated: 1888 (as Williamstown Cup)
- Race type: Thoroughbred
- Sponsor: Chandon (2026)

Race information
- Distance: 2,400 metres
- Surface: Turf
- Track: Left-handed
- Qualification: Maidens ineligible
- Weight: Weight for age
- Purse: $750,000 (2026)

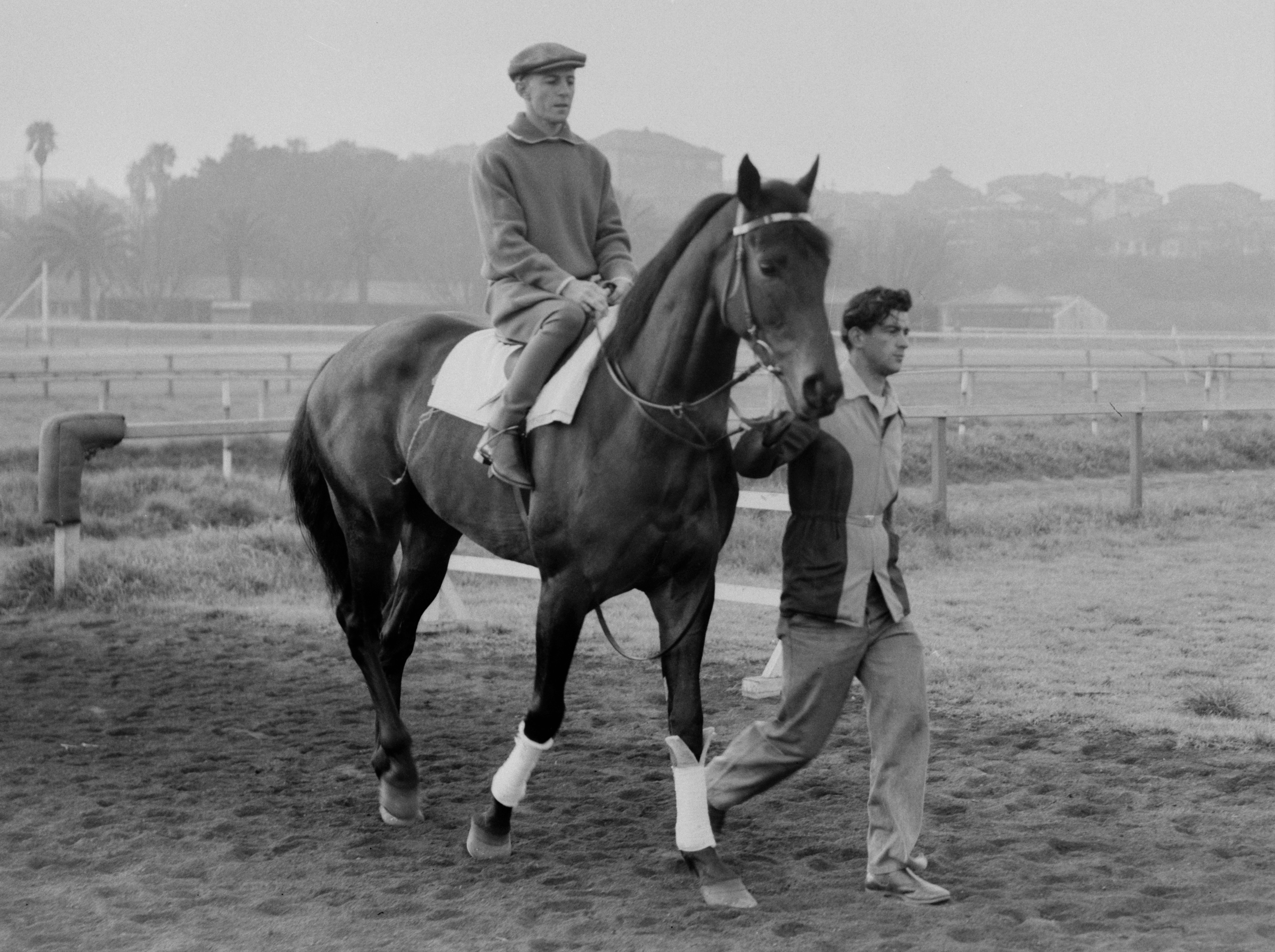
Prince Cortauld, 1954 winner

The Zipping Classic, registered as the MRC Sandown Classic is a Melbourne Racing Club Group 2 Thoroughbred horse race held under weight for age conditions over a distance of 2400 metres run at Sandown Racecourse, Melbourne, Australia in mid-November.

== History ==
The event was initially held by the Williamstown Racing Club at the Williamstown Racecourse. After the racecourse grandstand burned to the ground in 1947 the racing club amalgamated with the privately owned Victorian Trotting and Racing Association to become the Melbourne Racing Club and moved the event to Sandown Racecourse. In 1963 the racing club merged with the Victoria Amateur Turf Club and the club changed the name of the event.

Prior to 1999 the conditions of the race were an open handicap. Since 2011, the name of the race has been changed to honour Zipping, after he won the race for a fourth consecutive time in 2010. In 2013, the race was transferred to Caulfield due to renovations occurring at Sandown.

Meanwhile, in 2010 the Melbourne Racing Club introduced a new Sandown Cup into the program. This event became a Listed race in 2012 and is held over 3,200 metres.

From 2021-25, the race was moved to Caulfield Racecourse and occurred two weeks later than its original date, which was one week after the conclusion of the Flemington carnival. It was returned to Sandown and its original date in 2026.

== 1948 racebook ==
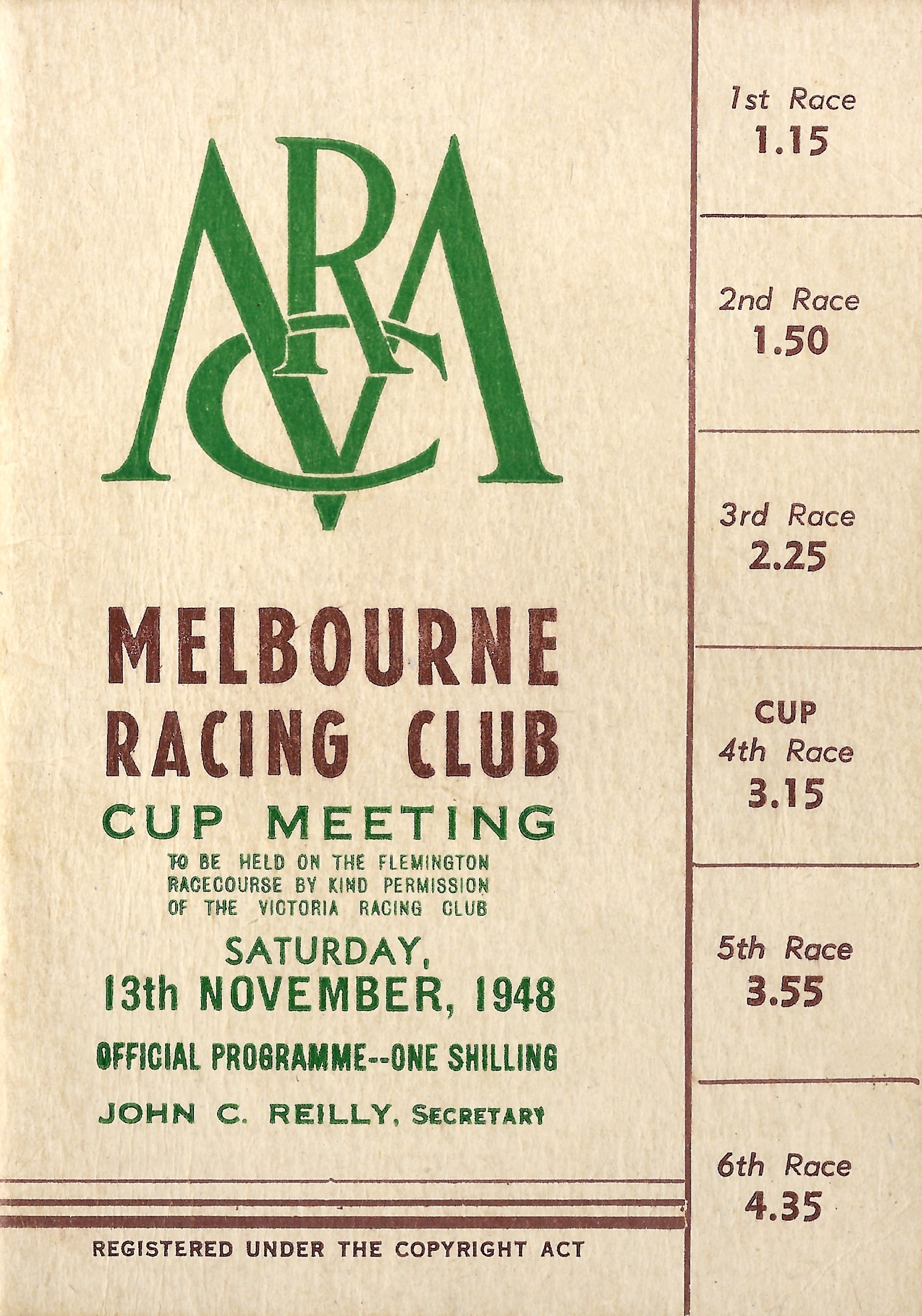
1948 MRC Williamstown Cup racebook front cover

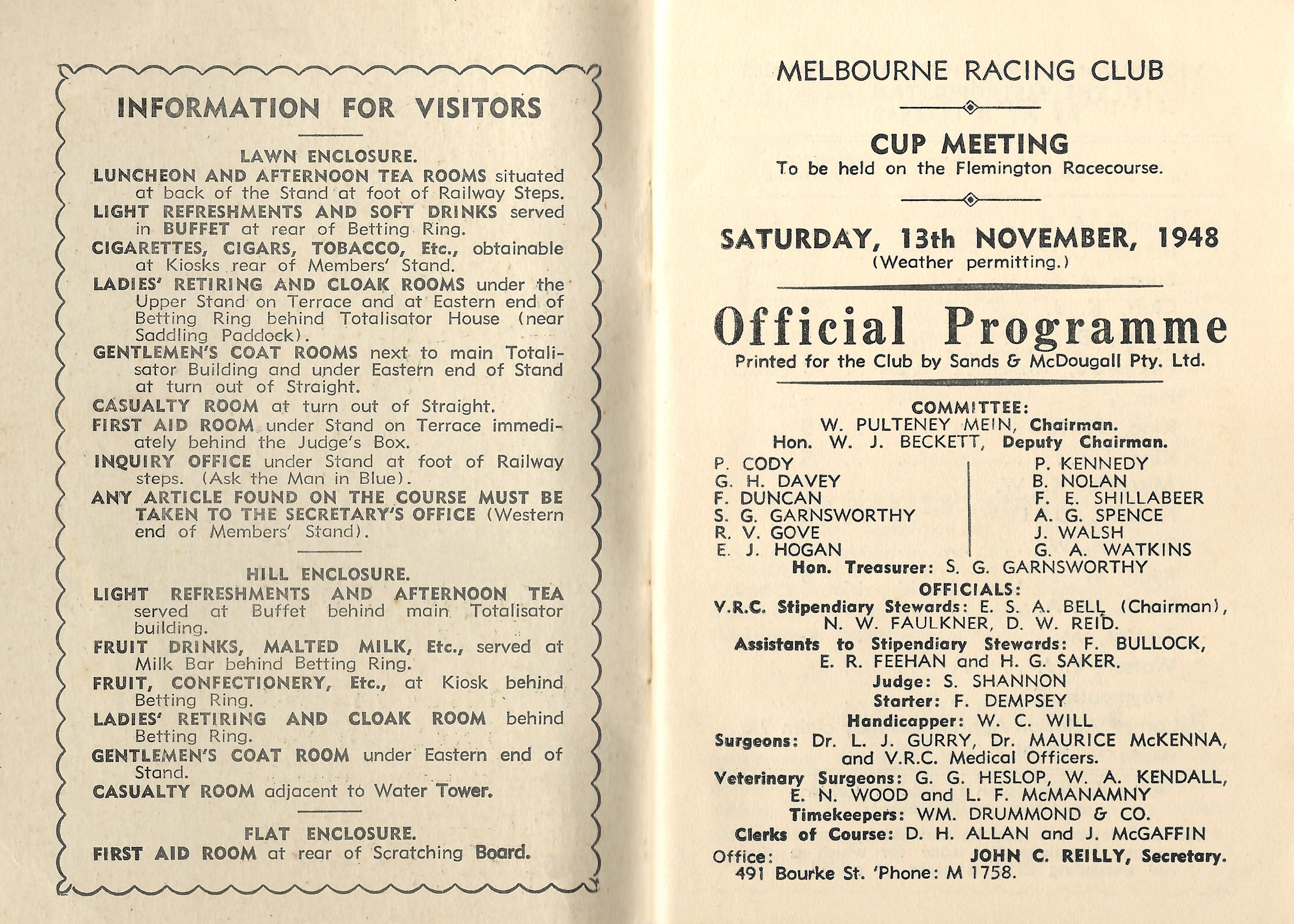
1948 MRC Williamstown Cup raceday officials

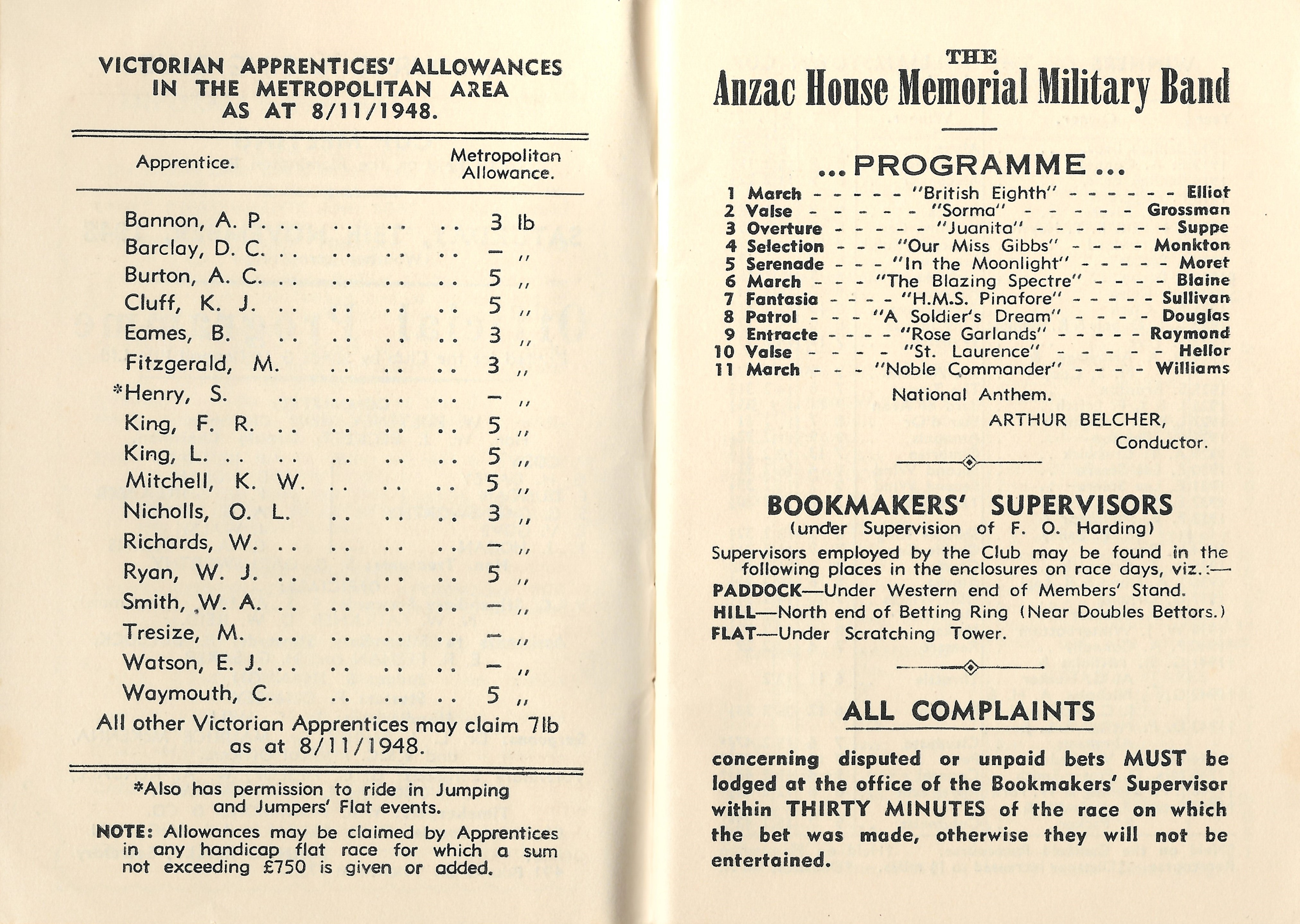
1948 MRC Williamstown Cup official oncourse notices for patrons

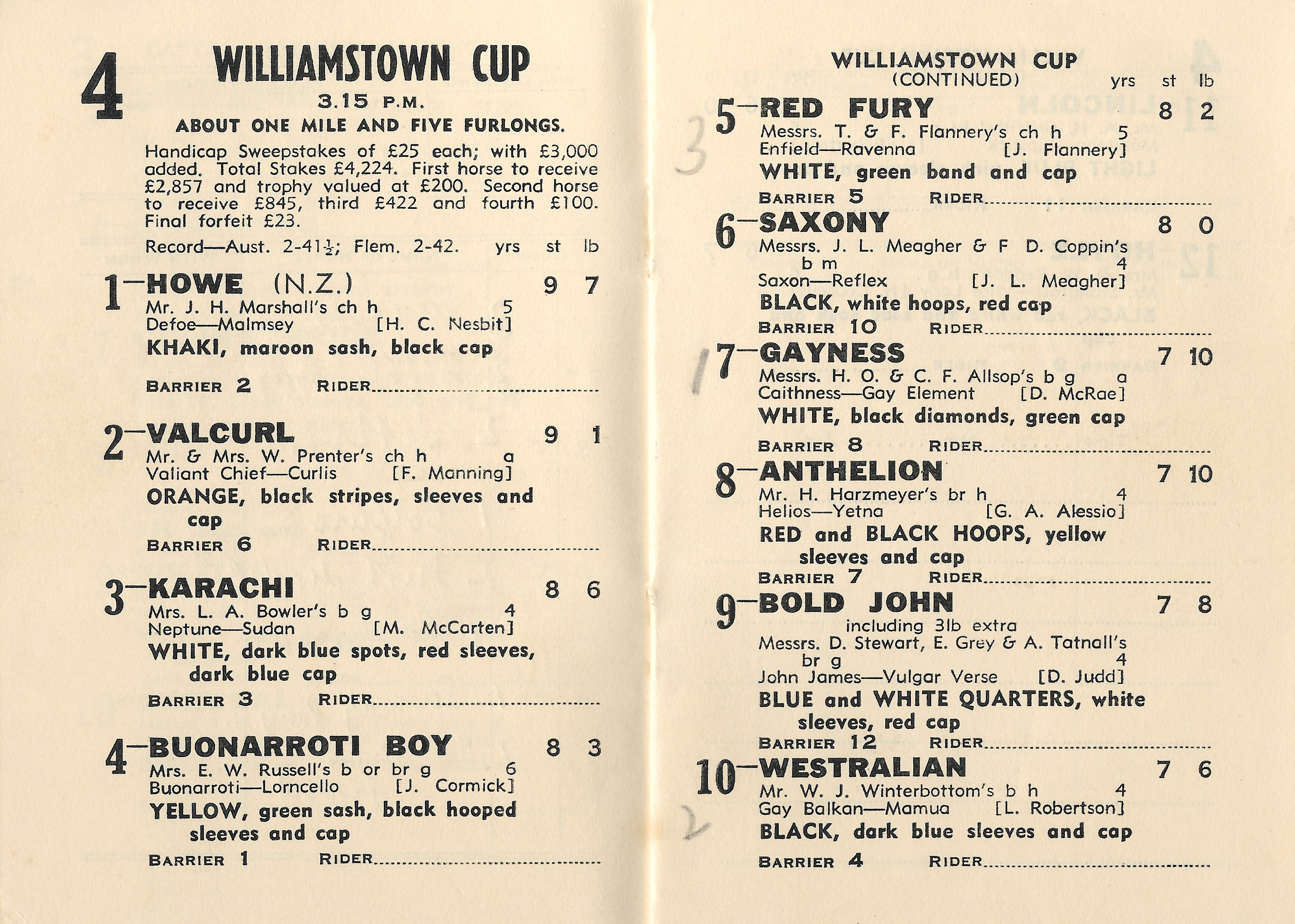
1948 MRC Williamstown Cup starters and results showing the winner, Gayness

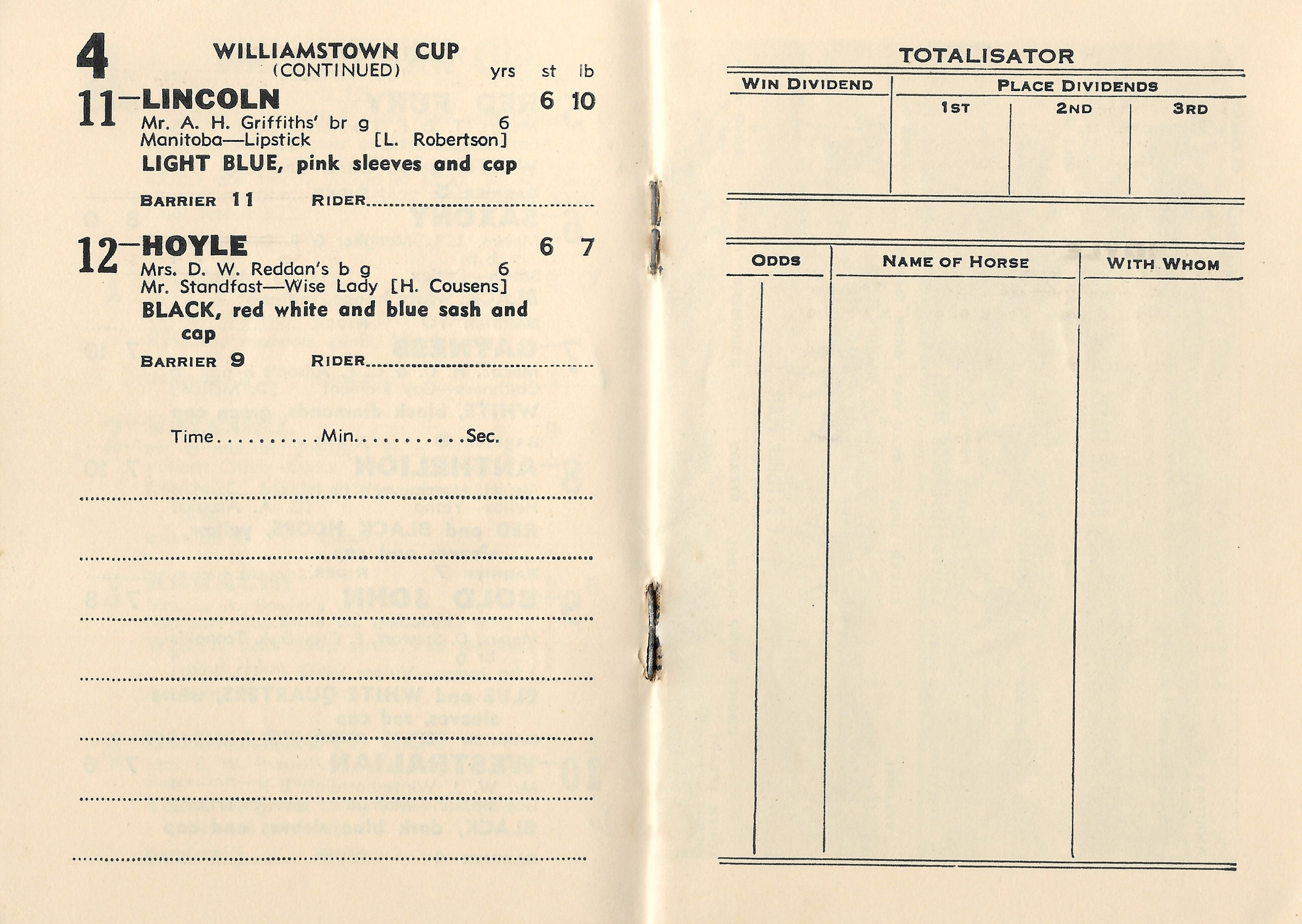
1948 MRC Williamstown Cup starters and results

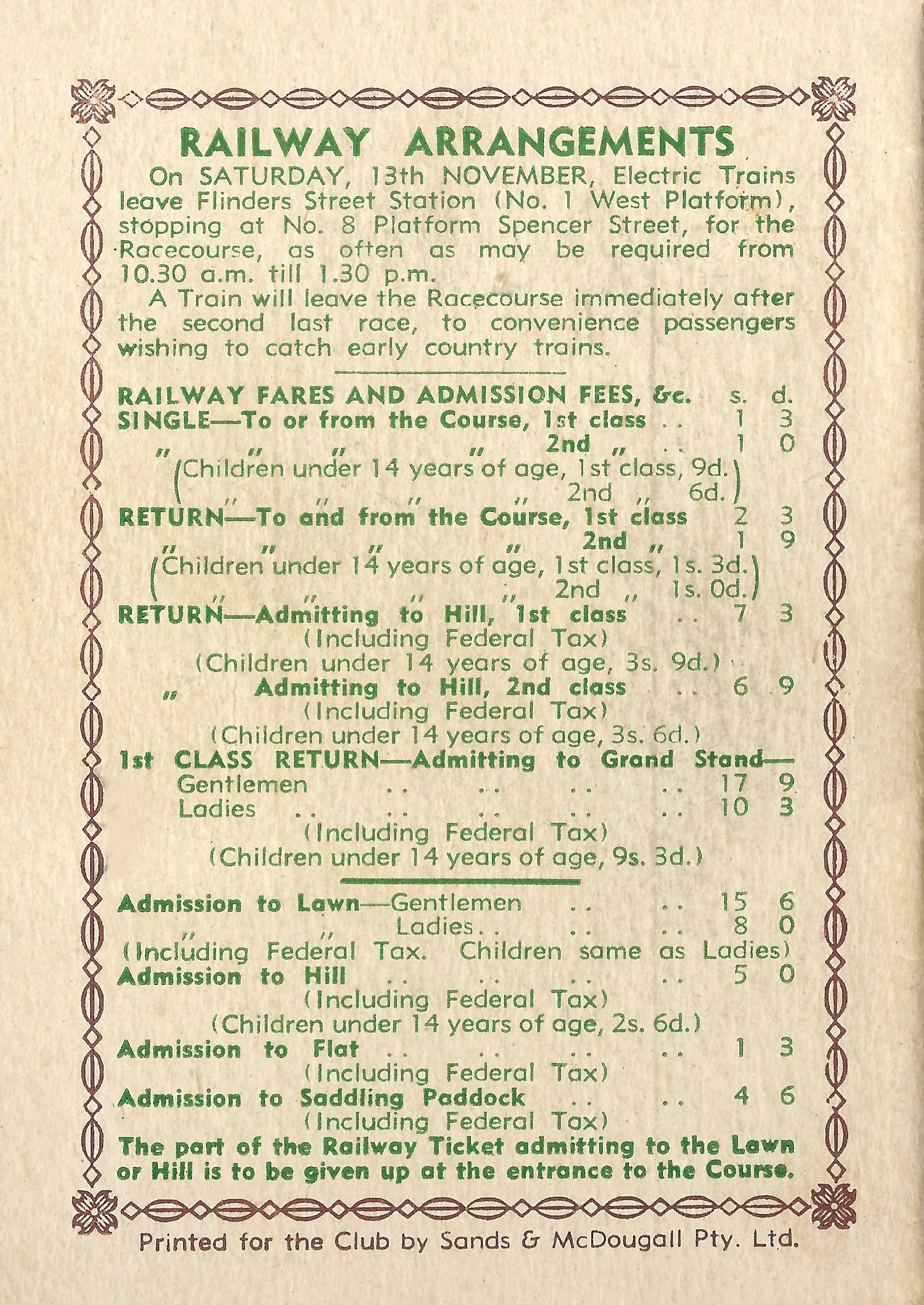
Back cover showing railway and admission charges

=== Name ===
- 1888–1962 - Williamstown Cup (except in 1945 it was called the Victory Cup for the end of World War II)
- 1963–1998 - Sandown Cup
- 1999–2010 - Sandown Classic
- 2011 onwards - Zipping Classic

=== Grade ===
- 1888–1978 - Principal race
- 1979 onwards - Group 2

=== Distance ===
- 1888–1919 - 1 3/8 miles (~2200 metres)
- 1920–1942 and 1951–1971 - 1 1/2 miles (~2400 metres)
- 1943–1950 - 1 5/8 miles (~2600 metres)
- 1972 onwards - 2400 metres

== Winners since 1999 ==
The following are past winners of the race.

Year	Winner	Jockey	Trainer	Time
2026	Kingswood	John Allen	Gavin Beddgood	2:34.03
2025	She's A Hustler	Jordan Childs	Grahame Begg	2:31.19
2024	Arapaho	Rachel King	Bjorn Baker	2:33.01
2023	Military Mission	Jye McNeill	Gai Waterhouse & Adrian Bott	2:31.73
2022	Vow And Declare	John Allen	Danny O'Brien	2:28.13
2021	Sound	Jamie Mott	Michael Moroney	2:32.65
2020	Sound	Jamie Kah	Michael Moroney	2:37.09
2019	Southern France	Mark Zahra	Ciaron Maher & David Eustace	2:32.01
2018	The Taj Mahal	Ben Melham	Liam Howley	2:31.52
2017	The Taj Mahal	Ben Melham	Robert Hickmott	2:30.09
2016	Beautiful Romance	Glyn Schofield	Saeed bin Suroor	2:29.05
2015	Who Shot Thebarman	James McDonald	Chris Waller	2:29.10
2014	Au Revoir	Kerrin McEvoy	Andre Fabre	2:32.06
2013	Sertorius	Ryan Maloney	Bruce Elkington	2:30.97
2012	Tanby	Nicholas Hall	Robert Hickmott	2:32.01
2011	Americain	Gerald Mosse	Alain de Royer-Dupre	2:37.87
2010	Zipping	Nicholas Hall	Robert Hickmott	2:39.49
2009	Zipping	Michael Rodd	Robert Hickmott	2:32.29
2008	Zipping	Michael Rodd	John Sadler	2:35.05
2007	Zipping	Steven Arnold	John Sadler	2:33.72
2006	Gallant Guru	Steven Arnold	Lee Freedman	2:30.87
2005	Roman Arch	Noel Callow	Robbie Laing	2:33.75
2004	Count Ricardo	Blake Shinn	Stephen Theodore	2:37.94
2003	Legible	Danny Nikolic	Bradley Marzato	2:29.83
2002	Hail	Greg Childs	Bruce Marsh	2:27.91
2001	Sky Heights	Damien Oliver	Colin Alderson	2:28.35
2000	Brave Chief	Patrick Payne	John Ledger	2:24.31
1999	Aerosmith	Greg Childs	Peter Hurdle	2:30.30

=== Earlier winners ===
- 1998 - Cheviot
- 1997 - Star Binder
- 1996 - Royal Snack
- 1995 - Count Chivas
- 1994 - Our Pompeii
- 1993 - Tawlord
- 1992 - Silk Ali
- 1991 - Stylish Century
- 1990 - Pressman's Choice
- 1989 - Sydeston
- 1988 - Conbituate Lady
- 1987 - Colour Page
- 1986 - Pharostan
- 1985 - Puckle Harbour
- 1984 - Rich Brother
- 1983 - Al Dwain
- 1982 - Bianco Lady
- 1981 - Allez Bijou
- 1980 - Arwon
- 1979 - Hauberk
- 1978 - Salamander
- 1977 - Tom's Mate
- 1976 - Kiwi Can
- 1975 - Captain Peri
- 1974 - Pyramul
- 1973 - Baghdad Note
- 1972 - Stormy Seas
- 1971 - Gunsynd
- 1970 - What's Brewing
- 1969 - General Command
- 1968 - Better Talk
- 1967 - Future
- 1966 - Light Fingers
- 1965 - Red William
- 1964 - Sir Wynyard
- 1963 - Conference
- 1962 - New Statesman
- 1961 - Twilight Glow
- 1960 - Ilumquh
- 1959 - Royal Jester
- 1958 - Droll Prince
- 1957 - Sailor's Guide
- 1956 - Fighting Force
- 1955 - Ray Ribbon
- 1954 - Prince Cortauld
- 1953 - Royal Radiant
- 1952 - Morse Code
- 1951 - Shoreham
- 1950 - Morse Code
- 1949 - Saxony
- 1948 - Gayness
- 1947 - Columnist
- 1946 - Royal Scot
- 1945 - Counsel
- 1944 - Peter
- 1943 - Claudette
- 1942 - Phocion
- 1941 - Throttle
- 1940 - Remarc
- 1939 - Maikai
- 1938 - Manolive
- 1937 - John Wilkes
- 1936 - Amalia
- 1935 - Garrio
- 1934 - Gothic Gem
- 1933 - Shadow King
- 1932 - Yarramba
- 1931 - Second Wind
- 1930 - Second Wind
- 1929 - Cimbrian
- 1928 - Amounis
- 1927 - Star D'Or
- 1926 - Bard Of Avon
- 1925 - The Tyrant
- 1924 - San Antonio
- 1923 - Wynette
- 1922 - King Ingoda
- 1921 - Tangalooma
- 1920 - Millieme
- 1919 - Richmond Main
- 1918 - Sea Bound
- 1917 - Prince Bardolph
- 1916 - Wishing Cap
- 1915 - Carlita
- 1914 - Aleconner
- 1913 - Sea Prince
- 1912 - Almissa
- 1911 - Duke Foote
- 1910 - Aborigine
- 1909 - Kerlie
- 1908 - Iolaire
- 1907 - Thackeray
- 1906 - Ellis
- 1905 - Demas
- 1904 - St. Ambrose
- 1903 - Billali
- 1902 - Eleanor
- 1901 - Flagship
- 1900 - Paul Pry
- 1899 - Delusive
- 1898 - Auriferous
- 1897 - Battalion
- 1896 - Merman
- 1895 - Music
- 1894 - Taranaki
- 1893 - Jeweller
- 1892 - E.K.
- 1891 - Propounder
- 1890 - Don Giovan
- 1889 - Tarcoola
- 1888 - Mara

Charts results (1983– )

== See also ==
- Blue Sapphire Stakes
- Eclipse Stakes (MRC)
- Sandown Stakes
- Sandown Guineas
- Summoned Stakes
- Thoroughbred Club Stakes
- List of Australian Group races
- Group races
