= 2011 Melbourne Cup =

Australian horse race

- Melbourne Cup
- Location: Flemington Racecourse; Melbourne, Australia
- Date: 1 November 2011
- Winning horse: Dunaden
- Jockey: Christophe Lemaire
- Trainer: Mikel Delzangles
- Surface: Grass
- Attendance: 105,979

With 300 meters to go now, Precedence hit the lead but Manighar challenges strongly, Lucas Cranach and getting up on the inside Lost in the Moment with a challenge, Here's Red Caudeaux starting to flash home on the outside now. Lucas Cranach hit the lead, Red Caudeaux coming down the outside, Dunaden is coming through in the middle. Dunaden, Red Caudeaux and Lucas Cranach. Dunaden is coming hard, Dunaden, Red Caudeaux. Dunaden and Red Caudeaux they hit the line a photo finish, between Dunaden and Red Caudeaux nothing in it!

— Commentator Greg Miles describes the climax of the race

The 2011 Emirates Melbourne Cup, the 151st running of Australia's most prestigious Thoroughbred horse race, was held on Tuesday, 1 November 2011 at 3:00 pm (AEDT), at Melbourne's Flemington Racecourse. Dunaden won in a photo finish over Red Cadeaux in the closest finish in Melbourne Cup history.

The winning jockey, Frenchman Christophe Lemaire, had arrived in Australia less than a day previously as a late replacement for Craig Williams.

Six out of the first seven finishers were international horses. Third placed Lucas Cranach was the best locally trained finisher and fourth placed was the pre-race favourite, the 2010 winner, Americain.

In related events the federal government's parliamentary question time was brought forward half an hour in order that it would conclude before the race began.

== Field ==
Horses are bred and trained in Australia, unless otherwise indicated. All columns in this table can be sorted by clicking the icons in the top row.

Saddle cloth	Horse	Trainer	Jockey	Weight	Barrier	Placing
1	Americain	Alain de Royer-Dupré (France)	Gérald Mossé	58.0 kg	15	4th
2	Jukebox Jury	Mark Johnston (UK)	Neil Callan	57.0 kg	6	20th
3	Dunaden	Mikel Delzangles (France)	Christophe Lemaire	54.5 kg	13	1st
4	Drunken Sailor	Luca Cumani (UK)	Dwayne Dunn	54.0 kg	8	12th
5	Glass Harmonium	Michael Moroney	Lisa Cropp	54.0 kg	23	22nd
6	Manighar	Luca Cumani (UK)	Damien Oliver	54.0 kg	21	5th
7	Unusual Suspect	Michael Kent	Brad Rawiller	54.0 kg	7	9th
8	Fox Hunt	Mark Johnston (UK)	Silvestre de Sousa	53.5 kg	19	7th
9	Lucas Cranach	Anthony Freedman	Corey Brown	53.5 kg	11	3rd
10	Mourayan	Robert Hickmott	Hugh Bowman	53.5 kg	14	scratched
11	Precedence	Bart Cummings	Darren Beadman	53.5 kg	2	11th
12	Red Cadeaux	Ed Dunlop (UK)	Michael Rodd	53.5 kg	16	2nd
13	Hawk Island	Chris Waller	Glyn Schofield	53.0 kg	18	18th
14	Illo	Bart Cummings	Jim Cassidy	53.0 kg	1	19th
15	Lost in the Moment	Saeed Bin Suroor (UAE)	William Buick	53.0 kg	3	6th
16	Modun	Saeed Bin Suroor (UAE)	Kerrin McEvoy	53.0 kg	5	23rd
17	At First Sight	Robert Hickmott	Steven King	52.5 kg	10	10th
18	Moyenne Corniche	Brian Ellison (UK)	Brett Prebble	52.0 kg	17	15th
19	Saptapadi	Brian Ellison (UK)	Chris Symons	52.0 kg	22	16th
20	Shamrocker	Danny O'Brien	Luke Nolen	52.0 kg	24	21st
21	The Verminator	Chris Waller	Craig Newitt	52.0 kg	4	13th
22	Tullamore	Gai Waterhouse	Chris Munce	52.0 kg	12	14th
23	Niwot	Michael, Wayne & John Hawkes	Dean Yendall	51.0 kg	9	8th
24	Older Than Time	Gai Waterhouse	Tim Clark	51.0 kg	20	17th
