= 2010 Melbourne Cup =

Australian horse race

- Melbourne Cup
- Location: Flemington Racecourse; Melbourne, Australia
- Date: 2 November 2010
- Winning horse: Americain
- Jockey: Gerald Mosse
- Trainer: Alain de Royer Dupre
- Surface: Grass
- Attendance: 110,223

With 250 meters to go, So You Think has raced up, Americain is a danger then Harris Tweed, Tokai Trick the rail. So You Think in front, Americain is coming at him hard. Americain raced past So You Think and then Maluckyday. Americain for France coming right away Americain. Americain is coming away, Americain Tres Bien!

— Commentator Greg Miles describes the climax of the race

The 2010 Melbourne Cup, the 150th running of Australia's most prestigious Thoroughbred horse race, was held on Tuesday, 2 November 2010 at 3:00 PM. local time (0400 UTC).

It was won by Americain, a French-trained horse who had won the Geelong Cup at his only other Australian start. Second placing went to the lightly raced Lexus Stakes winner Maluckyday, while third placing went to dual Cox Plate winner and short-priced favourite So You Think.

The official winning time was 3:26.87 with the margins of 2.8 lengths and 0.5 lengths back to third. The race was run on a slow (6) track with persistent rain falling causing flooding and closure of the Cup Day car park.

== Field ==
Horses are bred and trained in Australia, unless otherwise indicated. All columns in this table can be sorted by clicking the icons in the top row.

Saddle cloth	Horse	Trainer	Jockey	Weight	Barrier	Placing
1	Shocking	Mark Kavanagh	Michael Rodd	57	24	18th
2	Campanologist (USA)	Saeed bin Suroor (UAE)	Kerrin McEvoy	56	19	16th
3	So You Think (NZ)	Bart Cummings	Steven Arnold	56	3	3rd
4	Zipping	Robert Hickmott	Nicholas Hall	55.5	16	4th
5	Illustrious Blue (GB)	William J Knight (GB)	Glen Boss	55	9	9th
6	Mr Medici (IRE)	Peter Ho (HK)	Darren Beadman	55	5	10th
7	Shoot Out	John Wallace	Corey Brown	55	17	13th
8	Americain (USA)	Alain de Royer-Dupré (FR)	Gérald Mossé	54.5	12	1st
9	Tokai Trick (JPN)	Kenji Nonaka (JPN)	Shinji Fujita	54.5	4	12th
10	Buccellati (GB)	Tony Noonan	Steven King	54	21	20th
11	Descarado (NZ)	Gai Waterhouse	Nash Rawiller	54	1	did not finish
12	Harris Tweed (NZ)	Murray & Bjorn Baker	Brad Rawiller	54	13	5th
13	Manighar (FR)	Luca Cumani (GB)	Damien Oliver	54	20	7th
14	Master O'Reilly (NZ)	Danny O'Brien	Vlad Duric	54	18	15th
15	Monaco Consul (NZ)	Michael Moroney	Craig Williams	54	14	14th
16	Profound Beauty (IRE)	Dermot K Weld (IRE)	Pat Smullen	54	22	17th
17	Zavite (NZ)	Anthony Cummings	Michael Walker	54	7	22nd
18	Bauer (IRE)	Luca Cumani (GB)	Chris Munce	53.5	2	scratched
19	Holberg (UAE)	Saeed bin Suroor (UAE)	Frankie Dettori	53.5	10	6th
20	Precedence (NZ)	Bart Cummings	J M Winks	53.5	15	8th
21	Red Ruler (NZ)	John Sargent (NZ)	Mark Du Plessis	53.5	8	19th
22	Linton	Robert Hickmott	Brett Prebble	52	23	21st
23	Once Were Wild	Gai Waterhouse	Jim Cassidy	51.5	11	11th
24	Maluckyday (NZ)	Michael, Wayne and John Hawkes	Luke Nolen	51	6	2nd
