= 2007 Melbourne Cup =

Australian horse race

- Melbourne Cup
- Location: Flemington Racecourse; Melbourne, Australia
- Date: 6 November 2007
- Winning horse: Efficient
- Jockey: Michael Rodd
- Trainer: Graeme Rogerson
- Surface: Grass
- Attendance: 102,411

Mahler the leader in the Cup from Purple Moon, Sculptor, Douro Valley the rail, Lazer Sharp runs on, Zipping and Efficient is coming down the outside. Purple Moon for Ollie got to Mahler now, here comes Efficient he's mowing them down out wide. Purple Moon in front, Efficient the only danger. Purple Moon in front, Efficient is getting there, Efficient getting to Purple Moon, Efficient is going to win the Cup half a length to Purple Moon!

— Commentator Greg Miles describes the climax of the race

The 2007 Melbourne Cup, the 147th running of Australia's most prestigious thoroughbred horse race, was run on Tuesday, 6 November 2007, going at 3:00 pm local time (0400 UTC). The race was sponsored by the airline Emirates. The winner of the race was Efficient, by a half a length, followed by Purple Moon and Mahler in third.

Due to the 2007 Australian Equine influenza outbreak, believed to have been started by a horse brought into Australia from Japan, neither 2006 Melbourne Cup winner Delta Blues nor runner-up Pop Rock participated in the 2007 Melbourne Cup.

== Field ==
These were the confirmed starters, with barrier positions, jockeys, and trainers, for the 2007 Melbourne Cup:

Number	Horse	Trainer	Jockey	Weight (kg)	Barrier	Placing
1	Tawqeet (USA)	David Hayes	Dwayne Dunn	57	3	14
2	Blue Monday (GB)	David Hayes	Nash Rawiller	56	14	7
3	Blutigeroo	Colin Little	Luke Nolen	55.5	12	19
4	Gallic (NZ)	Graeme Rogerson	Stephen Arnold	55.5	24	Scratched
5	Railings	Roger James	Greg Childs	55.5	18	20
6	Efficient (NZ)	Graeme Rogerson	Michael Rodd	54.5	10	1
7	Maybe Better	Brian Mayfield-Smith	Corey Brown	54	7	Scratched
8	Tungsten Strike (USA)	Amanda Perrett	Darryll Holland	54	2	21
9	Zipping	Graeme Rogerson	Danny Nikolic	54	22	4
10	Black Tom	David A. Hayes	P A Hall	53.5	21	17
11	Master O'Reilly (NZ)	Danny O'Brien	Vlad Duric	53.5	17	8
12	Purple Moon (IRE)	Luca Cumani	Damien Oliver	53.5	15	2
13	Lazer Sharp	David A. Hayes	Blake Shinn	52.5	16	10
14	On a Jeune	Andrew J Payne	Kerrin McEvoy	52.5	4	6
15	Scenic Shot	Daniel Morton	Mark Zahra	52.5	19	16
16	Sarrera	Michael Moroney	Sebastian Murphy	52	23	18
17	Sculptor (NZ)	Peter Mckenzie	Lisa Cropp	52	8	9
18	Dolphin Jo	Terry & Karina O'Sullivan	Claire Lindop	51.5	1	5
19	Douro Valley	Danny O'Brien	James Winks	51.5	13	11
20	Sirmione	Bart Cummings	Peter Mertens	51.5	20	12
21	The Fuzz (NZ)	David A. Hayes	Craig Williams	51.5	11	Scratched
22	Eskimo Queen (NZ)	Michael Moroney	Craig Newitt	51	5	15
23	Princess Coup	Mark Walker	Noel Harris	51	9	13
24	Mahler (GB)	Aidan O'Brien	Stephen Baster	50.5	6	3

The favourites for this year's Melbourne Cup were:

1. Master O'Reilly 2. Purple Moon 3. Zipping 4. Sirmione 5. Princess Coup

== Results ==
Place	Barrier	Horse	Race Time
1st	9	Efficient (NZ)	3:23.34
2nd	13	Purple Moon (IRE)	
3rd	6	Mahler (GB)	
4th	20	Zipping	
5th	1	Dolphin Jo	
6th	4	On A Jeune	
7th	12	Blue Monday (GB)	
8th	15	Master O'Reilly (NZ)	
9th	7	Sculptor (NZ)	
10th	14	Lazer Sharp	
11th	11	Douro Valley	
12th	18	Sirmione	
13th	8	Princess Coup	
14th	3	Tawqeet (USA)	
15th	5	Eskimo Queen (NZ)	
16th	17	Scenic Shot	
17th	19	Black Tom	
18th	21	Sarrera	
19th	10	Blutigeroo	
20th	16	Railings	
21st	2	Tungsten Strike (USA)	
-	-	~~Gallic (NZ)~~	Scratched
-	-	~~Maybe Better~~	Scratched
-	-	~~The Fuzz (NZ)~~	Scratched
