= 2009 Melbourne Cup =

Australian horse race

- Melbourne Cup
- Location: Flemington Racecourse; Melbourne, Australia
- Date: 3 November 2009
- Winning horse: Shocking
- Jockey: Corey Brown
- Trainer: Mark Kavanagh
- Surface: Grass
- Attendance: 102,161

300 meters to go, here's Shocking after Crime Scene who's hit the lead, Harris Tweed was wider out and then C'est La Guerre and Alcopop. It's Crime Scene and Shocking racing clear at the 200, from Alcopop. It's on the outside Shocking and Crime Scene, Shocking with his head in front of Crime Scene, Shocking drawing away! It's Shocking to win the Melbourne Cup from Crime Scene, Mourilyan's come from nowhere to grab third!

— Commentator Greg Miles describes the climax of the race

The 2009 Melbourne Cup, the 149th running of Australia's most prestigious Thoroughbred horse race was run on Tuesday, 3 November 2009, starting at 3:00 PM local time (0400 UTC).

The race was won by Shocking. The 9–1 winner, trained by Mark Kavanagh and ridden by Corey Brown, won by three-quarters of a length.

== Field ==
Horses are from Australia, unless otherwise indicated.

| Saddle cloth | Horse | Trainer | Jockey | Weight (kg) | Barrier^{[b]} | Placing |
|---|---|---|---|---|---|---|
| 1 | Viewed | Bart Cummings | Brad Rawiller | 58.0 | 9 | 7th |
| 2nd | C'est La Guerre (NZ) | John Sadler | Nicholas Hall | 55.5 | 7 | 8th |
| 3 | Fiumicino (NZ) | M, W & J Hawkes | Steven King | 55.5 | 24 | 22nd |
| 4 | Master O'Reilly (NZ) | Danny O'Brien | Vlad Duric | 55.0 | 16 | 4th |
| 5 | Mourilyan (IRE) | Herman Brown (RSA) | Glyn Schofield | 54.5 | 14 | 3rd |
| 6 | Roman Emperor (NZ) | Bart Cummings | Hugh Bowman | 54.0 | 15 | 21st |
| 7 | Ista Kareem (NZ) | Colin Little | Luke Nolen | 53.5 | 23 | 15th |
| 8 | Crime Scene (IRE) | Saeed bin Suroor (UAE) | Kerrin McEvoy | 53.0 | 11 | 2nd |
| 9 | Munsef (GB) | Ian Williams (GB) | Zac Purton | 53.0 | 5 | 12th |
| 10 | Zavite (NZ) | Anthony Cummings | Mark Zahra | 53.0 | 3 | 19th |
| 11 | Alcopop | Jake Stephens | Dom Tournuer | 52.5 | 12 | 6th |
| 12 | Harris Tweed (NZ) | Murray & Bjorn Baker | Craig Newitt | 52.5 | 20 | 5th |
| 13 | Kibbutz (NZ) | Jarrod McLean | Chris Symons | 52.5 | 8 | 9th |
| 14 | Newport | Paul Perry | Peter Wells | 52.5 | 18 | 10th |
| 15 | Warringah (GB) | Chris Waller | Damien Oliver | 52.5 | 8 | 23rd |
| 16 | Gallions Reach (NZ) | Richard Yuill (NZ) | Dwayne Dunn | 52.0 | 6 | 13th |
| 17 | Spin Around | Steven Cooper (NZ) | Mark Du Plessis | 52.0 | 4 | 20th |
| 18 | Basaltico (IRE) | Luca Cumani (GB) | Danny Nikolic | 51.5 | 10 | 18th |
| 19 | Capecover (NZ) | Alexander R Fieldes (NZ) | Noel Harris | 51.5 | 19 | 17th |
| 20 | Daffodil (NZ) | Kevin Gray (NZ) | Chris Munce | 51.5 | 21 | 11th |
| 21 | Shocking | Mark Kavanagh | Corey Brown | 51.0 | 22 | 1st |
| 22 | Allez Wonder | Bart Cummings | Michelle Payne | 50.5 | 13 | 16th |
| 23 | Changingoftheguard (IRE) | David A. Hayes | Glen Boss | 50.5 | 1 | SCR |
| 24 | Leica Ding | Darren Weir | Craig Williams | 50.5 | 2 | 14th |

Notes

- ^{b} Horses in barriers to the outside of the scratched horse will move inwards.
