= Scobie Breasley Medal =

The Scobie Breasley Medal is an annual jockeys award, first presented by Racing Victoria Limited in 1996, that recognises excellence in race riding on Melbourne racetracks. Votes are cast by racing stewards at each meeting and are awarded on a 3-2-1 basis to what they deem to be the best ride of the day.

It is named in honour of the jockey Scobie Breasley, the first person inducted into the Australian Racing Hall of Fame.

== Winners ==
- 2026 Craig Williams
- 2025 Blake Shinn
- 2024 Blake Shinn
- 2023 Blake Shinn
- 2022 Blake Shinn
- 2021 Jamie Kah
- 2020 Damien Oliver
- 2019 Damien Oliver
- 2018 Damien Oliver
- 2017 Craig Williams
- 2016 Dwayne Dunn
- 2015 Damien Oliver
- 2014 Damien Oliver
- 2013 Michael Rodd
- 2012 Luke Nolen
- 2011 Luke Nolen
- 2010 Glen Boss
- 2009 Craig Williams
- 2008 Craig Williams
- 2007 Craig Williams
- 2006 Craig Williams
- 2005 Blake Shinn
- 2004 Damien Oliver
- 2003 Damien Oliver/Kerrin McEvoy (dead heat)
- 2002 Damien Oliver
- 2001 Damien Oliver/Brett Prebble (dead heat)
- 2000 Brett Prebble
- 1999 Damien Oliver
- 1998 Greg Childs
- 1997 Steven King
- 1996 Damien Oliver
