= Almandin (horse) =

German-bred Thoroughbred racehorse

- Racing silks of Almandin
- Sire: Monsun
- Grandsire: Königsstuhl
- Dam: Anatola
- Damsire: Tiger Hill
- Sex: Gelding
- Foaled: 27 March 2010
- Country: Germany
- Colour: Bay
- Breeder: Gestüt Schlenderhan
- Owner: NC, LJ & SJ Williams, BN Singer, P Mehrten, AL & BA Green, JA Ingham, V Sammartino, MS Gudinski
- Trainer: Wilhelm Giedt; Jean-Pierre Carvalho; Robert Hickmott; Liam Howley
- Record: 20: 7-6-1
- Earnings: $5,303,858

Major wins
- G. P. der Badischen Unternehmen (2014); Harry White Classic (2016); The Bart Cummings (2016); Melbourne Cup (2016); Tancred Stakes (2018)
- Last updated on 31 March 2018

Almandin (foaled 27 March 2010) is a Thoroughbred racehorse bred in Germany and trained in Germany and Australia.

He was the winner of the 2016 Melbourne Cup, ridden by Kerrin McEvoy and trained by Robert Hickmott.

== Background ==
Almandin is a bay gelding bred in Germany by Gestüt Schlenderhan. He was sired by Monsun, who also sired the 2013 Melbourne Cup winner, Fiorente, and the 2014 Melbourne Cup winner, Protectionist. Almandin's dam Anatola was a half-sister to the German Oaks winner Amarette.

== Racing career ==
In his first two seasons, Almandin was trained in Europe by Wilhelm Giedt and then Jean-Pierre Carvalho and raced in France and Germany. On 1 June 2014 he recorded his biggest victory in Europe when he won the Group Two Grosser Preis der Badischen Unternehmen over 2000 metres, beating Protectionist by three quarters of a length. He then had a lengthy spell due to a tendon injury.

In 2016, Almandin began racing in Australia, in the colours of Lloyd Williams and trained by Robert Hickmott. Williams syndicated the gelding with music promoter Michael Gudinski, Sydney businessman and thoroughbred owner John Ingham, Quiksilver founder Alan Green, Rip Curl co-founder Brian Singer and construction industry figures Vin Sammartino and Phil Mehrten.

In his first Australian run, over 1600 metres in June 2016, Almandin finished sixth; he then recorded two further unplaced finishes. On 24 September 2016, he won the Listed Harry White Classic over 2400 metres at Caulfield Racecourse beating his stablemate Assign by two lengths. Eight days later, he was moved up in class and distance for the Group 3 Bart Cummings over 2500 metres at Flemington. Ridden as in his previous start by Damien Oliver he started favourite and won by one and a half lengths from Zanteca.

On 1 November 2016, Almandin started at odds of around 10/1 for the Melbourne Cup at Flemington. Ridden by Kerrin McEvoy, he engaged in a stirring duel with the Irish challenger Heartbreak City for most of the straight, before taking the lead and winning in the final strides.

In 2019, Almandin was retired to the Living Legends property.

== Pedigree ==
Pedigree of Almandin (GER), bay gelding, 2010
Sire Monsun	Königsstuhl	Dschingis Khan	Tamerlane
Sire Monsun	Königsstuhl	Dschingis Khan	Donna Diana
Sire Monsun	Königsstuhl	Königskrönung	Tiepoletto
Sire Monsun	Königsstuhl	Königskrönung	Krönung
Sire Monsun	Mosella	Surumu	Literat
Sire Monsun	Mosella	Surumu	Surama
Sire Monsun	Mosella	Monasia	Authi
Sire Monsun	Mosella	Monasia	Monacensia
Dam Anatola	Tiger Hill	Danehill	Danzig
Dam Anatola	Tiger Hill	Danehill	Razyana
Dam Anatola	Tiger Hill	The Filly	Appiani II
Dam Anatola	Tiger Hill	The Filly	Tigress Silver
Dam Anatola	Avocette	Kings Lake	Nijinsky
Dam Anatola	Avocette	Kings Lake	Fish-Bar
Dam Anatola	Avocette	Akasma	Windwurf
Dam Anatola	Avocette	Akasma	Anona (Family 2-n)

== See also ==
- List of Melbourne Cup winners
