= Masked Marvel (horse) =

British-bred Thoroughbred racehorse

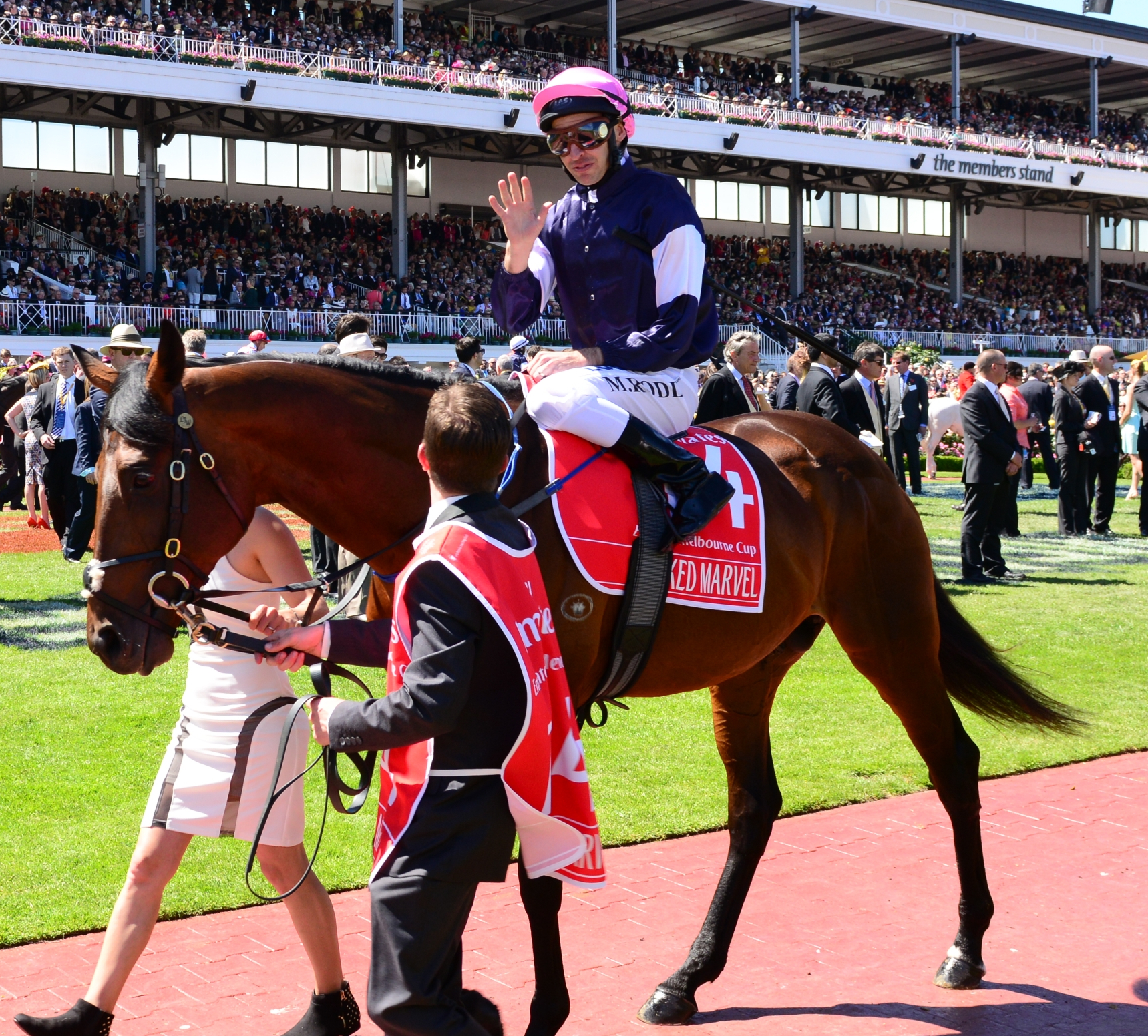
- The horse prior to the 2013 Melbourne Cup, with jockey Michael Rodd.
- Sire: Montjeu
- Grandsire: Sadler's Wells
- Dam: Waldmark
- Damsire: Mark of Esteem
- Sex: Stallion
- Foaled: 14 May 2008
- Country: Great Britain
- Colour: Bay
- Breeder: Newsells Park Stud
- Owner: Björn Nielsen; Lloyd Williams
- Trainer: John Gosden; Robert Hickmott
- Record: 14: 4–0–1
- Earnings: £392,971

Major wins
- Cocked Hat Stakes (2011); Bahrain Trophy (2011); St. Leger Stakes (2011)
- Last updated on October 12, 2006

Masked Marvel is a British Thoroughbred racehorse best known for winning the 2011 St. Leger Stakes.

== Background ==
Masked Marvel was sired by Montjeu out of the German mare Waldmark. He is closely related to the 2011 Deutsches Derby winner Waldpark. He was trained throughout his career in Europe by John Gosden at Newmarket, Suffolk.

He was bred by the Hertfordshire-based Newsells Park Stud, and was sent as a yearling at Deauville Sales in August 2009 where he was sold for €260,000 to Jeremy Brummitt, the racing manager of Bjorn Nielsen.

== Racing career ==
=== 2010: two-year-old season ===
Masked Marvel began his career by winning a maiden race at Sandown, staying on strongly to lead close home and win by two lengths. He was immediately stepped up into Group race company, finishing sixth to Abjer in the Autumn Stakes at Ascot.

=== 2011: three-year-old season ===
He began his three-year-old season by finishing fifth in the Sandown Classic Trial behind Genius Beast. Gosden later said that the colt was unsuited by the "tacky" ground. Masked Marvel then moved into Classic contention by beating Namibian by three lengths in the Cocked Hat Stakes, after which he was offered at 33–1 for the Derby. His trainer spoke positively of the colt, saying that, "he stays well and I like the way he quickened".

In the Derby he failed to cope with Epsom - Gosden described him as being "confused" by the course- and finished eighth of the thirteen runners, beaten just under nine lengths by Pour Moi. A month later, Masked Marvel re-appeared in the Bahrain Trophy at Newmarket, where he held off Census by a head in a tight finish to record his first Group race win. Despite the closeness of the finish, his rider Jimmy Fortune felt that the colt had more in reserve and was just "idling" in front. He was then rested and did not run again for ten weeks.

The St Leger was run at an unusually strong pace, making it a thorough test of stamina. Masked Marvel passed the Ballydoyle contender Seville two furlongs from home, opened up a clear lead, and stayed on strongly to win by three lengths from Brown Panther and Sea Moon in a race record time of 3:00.44. His rider, William Buick, who had been suspended for the colt's run at Newmarket, reported that Masked Marvel finished so well that he had difficulty pulling up. By a notable coincidence, the Gosden stable won the Irish St Leger less than an hour later when their gelding, Duncan dead-heated with Jukebox Jury at the Curragh

On 29 September Masked Marvel was a supplementary entry to the Prix de l'Arc de Triomphe for a fee of €100,000. The race had been the target for his stable companion Nathaniel who was withdrawn because of the firm ground at Longchamp. In the race, Masked Marvel raced prominently, but faded in the straight and finished last of the sixteen runners behind Danedream.

=== 2012: four-year-old season ===
Masked Marvel began his four-year-old season in the Jockey Club Stakes at Newmarket. He led in the early stages but faded in the straight and finished seventh of the eight runners behind Al Kazeem. At Epsom on 2 June he finished third behind St Nicholas Abbey in the Coronation Cup. His form then deteriorated as he finished unplaced in the King George VI and Queen Elizabeth Stakes, Geoffrey Freer Stakes and Doncaster Cup.

=== 2013/2014: four-year-old season ===
Masked Marvel was sold and exported to race in Australia. On his debut for his new connections he finished last in the Makybe Diva Stakes at Flemington Racecourse in September.

== Race record ==
Date	Race	Dist (f)	Course	Class	Prize (£K)	Odds	Runners	Placing	Margin	Time	Jockey	Trainer
15 September 2010	EBF Maiden Stakes	8	Sandown	M	4	13/8	9	1	2	1:50.36	William Buick	John Gosden
9 October 2010	Autumn Stakes	8	Ascot	3	22	7/2	8	6	11	1:44.84	William Buick	John Gosden
24 April 2011	Sandown Classic Trial	10	Sandown	3	28	21/1	9	5	8	2:11.39	William Buick	John Gosden
18 May 2011	Cocked Hat Stakes	11	Goodwood	Listed	17	13/2	5	1	3	2:25.55	William Buick	John Gosden
4 June 2011	Derby	12	Epsom	1	709	25/1	13	8	8.75	2:34.54	William Buick	John Gosden
7 July 2011	Bahrain Trophy	12	Newmarket July	3	28	2/1	6	1	head	2:49.54	Jimmy Fortune	John Gosden
10 September 2011	St Leger	14.5	Doncaster	1	306	15/2	9	1	3	3:00.44	William Buick	John Gosden
2 October 2011	Prix de l'Arc de Triomphe	12	Longchamp	1	1970	21/1	16	16	26	2:24.49	William Buick	John Gosden
5 May 2012	Jockey Club Stakes	12	Newmarket	1	56	9/1	8	7	17	2:39.66	William Buick	John Gosden
2 June 2012	Coronation Cup	12	Epsom	1	170	8/1	6	3	7.75	2:34.52	William Buick	John Gosden
21 July 2012	King George VI and Queen Elizabeth Stakes	12	Ascot	1	567	25/1	10	9	14.5	2:31.62	Frankie Dettori	John Gosden
18 August 2012	Geoffrey Freer Stakes	13.5	Newbury	3	31	3/1	6	4	12	2:49.20	Jimmy Fortune	John Gosden
14 September 2012	Doncaster Cup	18	Doncaster	2	56	9/1	10	8	8	3:58.11	William Buick	John Gosden
7 September 2013	Makybe Diva Stakes	8	Flemington	1	137	60/1	14	14	6	3:58.11	Steven Arnold	Robert Hickmott

== Pedigree ==
Pedigree of Masked Marvel (GB), bay horse, 2008
Sire Montjeu (IRE) 1996	Sadler's Wells; 1981	Northern Dancer	Nearctic
Sire Montjeu (IRE) 1996	Sadler's Wells; 1981	Northern Dancer	Natalma
Sire Montjeu (IRE) 1996	Sadler's Wells; 1981	Fairy Bridge	Bold Reason
Sire Montjeu (IRE) 1996	Sadler's Wells; 1981	Fairy Bridge	Special
Sire Montjeu (IRE) 1996	Floripedes; 1985	Top Ville	High Top
Sire Montjeu (IRE) 1996	Floripedes; 1985	Top Ville	Sega Ville
Sire Montjeu (IRE) 1996	Floripedes; 1985	Toute Cy	Tennyson
Sire Montjeu (IRE) 1996	Floripedes; 1985	Toute Cy	Adele Toumignon
Dam Waldmark (GER) 2000	Mark of Esteem; 1993	Darshaan	Shirley Heights
Dam Waldmark (GER) 2000	Mark of Esteem; 1993	Darshaan	Delsy
Dam Waldmark (GER) 2000	Mark of Esteem; 1993	Homage	Ajdal
Dam Waldmark (GER) 2000	Mark of Esteem; 1993	Homage	Home Love
Dam Waldmark (GER) 2000	Wurftaube; 1993	Acatenango	Surumu
Dam Waldmark (GER) 2000	Wurftaube; 1993	Acatenango	Aggravate
Dam Waldmark (GER) 2000	Wurftaube; 1993	Wurfbahn	Frontal
Dam Waldmark (GER) 2000	Wurftaube; 1993	Wurfbahn	Wolkenpracht (Family: 5-h)
