= Lloyd Williams (businessman) =

Australian property developer (born 1940)

- Born: Lloyd J. Williams; 7 May 1940 (age 86)
- Education: Xavier College, Melbourne
- Occupations: Property developer Businessman
- Known for: Thoroughbred horse racing Crown Casino and Entertainment Complex; Publishing and Broadcasting Limited; Hudson Conway
- Spouse: Suzie Williams
- Children: 2

Lloyd J. Williams (born 7 May 1940) is an Australian property developer and businessperson, with significant interests in thoroughbred horse racing. He holds the record as a thoroughbred owner to have won the Melbourne Cup on the most occasions, his most recent in 2020 with Twilight Payment.

== Biography ==
Williams was educated at Xavier College, Melbourne.

He is the founder of Crown Casino and Entertainment Complex, established in 1994, located in Melbourne, Victoria. Crown is Australia's largest casino and one of the largest single casinos in the world. In 1999, Williams sold the majority of his interests to Publishing and Broadcasting Limited and other entities associated with the Packer family.

With David Gonski, Williams was the co-executor of the estate of the late Kerry Packer. Jackson Lloyd Packer, the son and male heir of James Packer, was given his middle name out of respect to Williams.

Williams' family controlled business is called Hudson Conway, that has investments in a wide range of properties across Melbourne, now managed by his son, Nick.

=== Thoroughbred horse racing ===
Williams is one of Australia's largest thoroughbred racehorse owners and owns a 120 hectares (300 acres) stable outside Melbourne. With his wife, Suzie, Williams has won Australia's most prestigious race, the Melbourne Cup on seven occasions:

- 1981 - Just a Dash, trained by Tommy J. Smith
- 1985 - What A Nuisance, trained by John Meagher
- 2007 - Efficient, trained by Graeme Rogerson
- 2012 - Green Moon, trained by Robert Hickmott
- 2016 - Almandin, trained by Robert Hickmott
- 2017 - Rekindling, trained by Joseph O'Brien
- 2020 - Twilight Payment, trained by Joseph O'Brien.

In 2000, he and Kerry Packer bought Enzeli from Aga Khan for about £200,000 to race in the Cup.

Williams also owned/part-owned:

- Fawkner, winner of the 2013 Caulfield Cup.
- Mahogany, winner of eight group 1 races including the double of the Caulfield Guineas and Australian Guineas and the Victoria Derby and Australian Derby as a three-year-old, and the Lightning Stakes in 1995 and 1997
- Order of St George, winner of the 2015 & 2017 Irish St. Leger and 2016 Ascot Gold Cup
- Reset, winner of the 2004 Australian Guineas and Futurity Stakes (MRC)
- Zipping, winner of the 2010 Australian Cup and Turnbull Stakes and the Sandown Classic four times (2010-2013).

Williams was inducted into the Australian Racing Hall of Fame in 2017.

=== Net worth ===
In 2012 Forbes Asia assessed his net worth as US$670 million. As of May 2025 Williams' net worth was assessed by the Financial Review 2025 Rich List as A$1.03 billion.

Year	Financial Review Rich List		Forbes Australia's 50 Richest	
Year	Rank	Net worth (A$)	Rank	Net worth (US$)
2017		$784 million		
2018	95 ▲	$787 million ▲		
2019	100 ▼	$914 million ▲		
2020	110 ▼	$896 million ▼		
2021	119 ▼	$903 million ▲		
2022	141 ▼	$948 million ▲		
2023	143 ▼	$990 million ▲		
2024		$1.00 billion ▲		
2025	157	$1.03 billion ▲		

Legend
Icon	Description
Steady	Has not changed from the previous year
▲	Has increased from the previous year
▼	Has decreased from the previous year

=== Awards ===
In 2002 Williams was awarded the Australian Sports Medal in recognition of creating a programme for troubled teens to learn to sail as part of their rehabilitation.

== See also ==
- Publishing and Broadcasting Limited
- Crown Limited
