= 2016 Melbourne Cup =

Australian horse race

- Melbourne Cup
- Location: Flemington Racecourse; Melbourne, Australia
- Date: 1 November 2016
- Winning horse: Almandin
- Starting price: $11
- Jockey: Kerrin McEvoy
- Trainer: Robert Hickmott
- Surface: Grass
- Attendance: 97,479

Heartbreak City and Almandin race up to Hartnell, they look the three from Almoonquith. It's Heartbreak City, Almandin on the outside the pair down to fight it out. Heartbreak City the inside and Almandin on the outside, Almandin and Hearthbreak City, what a finish to the Melbourne Cup! Almandin putting his nose in front of Heartbreak City they hit the line, Almandin! Almandin won it by a very narrow marigin from Heartbreak City.

— Commentator Greg Miles describes the climax of the race

The 2016 Emirates Melbourne Cup was the 156th running of the Melbourne Cup, an Australian thoroughbred horse race. The race, run over 3,200 metres (1.988 mi), was held on 1 November 2016 at Melbourne's Flemington Racecourse. The date was a public holiday in the state of Victoria. The final field for the race was declared on 29 October. The total prize money for the race was A$6.2 million, the same as the previous year.

The winner was Almandin, ridden by Kerrin McEvoy, who won his 2nd Melbourne Cup after a 16-year gap between his first Melbourne Cup win, and trained by Robert Hickmott. Heartbreak City ran second and Hartnell third. The race was run in 3:20:58. Commentator Greg Miles called his 36th and last Melbourne Cup.

== Field ==
This is a list of horses which ran in the 2016 Melbourne Cup.

Place	Number	Horse	Weight	Trainer	Jockey
1st	17	Almandin (GER)	52 kg	Robert Hickmott	Kerrin McEvoy
2nd	13	Heartbreak City (FR)	54	Tony Martin	João Moreira
3rd	6	Hartnell (GB)	56	John O'Shea	James McDonald
4th	23	Qewy (IRE)	51.5	Charlie Appleby	Craig Williams
5th	7	Who Shot TheBarman (NZ)	56	Chris Waller	Hugh Bowman
6th	9	Almoonquith (USA)	54.5	David, Ben Hayes & T Dabernig	Michael Walker
7th	16	Beautiful Romance (GB)	52.5	Saeed bin Suroor	Damian Lane
8th	5	Exospheric (GB)	56	Lee & Anthony Freedman	Damien Oliver
9th	22	Pentathlon (NZ)	51.5	John Wheeler	Mark Du Plessis
10th	1	Big Orange (GB)	57	Michael Bell	Jamie Spencer
11th	11	Grand Marshal (GB)	54.5	Chris Waller	Ben Melham
12th	20	Oceanographer (GB)	52	Charlie Appleby	Chad Scholfield
13th	4	Bondi Beach	56	Aidan O'Brien	Ryan Moore
14th	19	Grey Lion (IRE)	52	Matt Cumani	Glen Boss
15th	12	Jameka	54.5	Ciaron Maher	Nicholas Hall
16th	15	Excess Knowledge (GB)	53.5	Gai Waterhouse & Adrian Bott	Vlad Duric
17th	2	Our Ivanhowe (GER)	57	Lee & Anthony Freedman	Dwayne Dunn
18th	14	Sir John Hawkwood (IRE)	54	John P Thompson	Blake Spriggs
19th	18	Assign	52	Robert Hickmott	Katelyn Mallyon
20th	10	Gallante (IRE)	54.5	Robert Hickmott	Blake Shinn
21st	21	Secret Number (GB)	52	Saeed bin Suroor	Stephen Baster
22nd	8	Wicklow Brave (GB)	56	Willie Mullins	Frankie Dettori
23rd	3	Curren Mirotic (JPN)	56.5	Osamu Hirata	Tommy Berry
24th	24	Rose Of Virginia	51	Lee & Shannon Hope	Ben Thompson (a)

== See also ==
- List of Melbourne Cup winners
- List of Melbourne Cup placings
