= Nicholas Hall =

Australian jockey

Nicholas Hall is a Melbourne jockey originally from Brisbane, Queensland.

== Background ==
Nicholas Hall is the son of the retired jockey Greg Hall who rode multiple group one winners in his career, including the:

- 1992 Melbourne Cup on Subzero for Lee Freedman
- 1992 Cox Plate on Super Impose for Lee Freedman.

His grandfather Ron Hall was a jumps jockey.

Nicholas never showed an interest in riding until he was 17 and decided to try it. He was so inexperienced that the first time he tried to ride a horse, he put the saddle on backwards.

== Riding career ==
Hall quickly became one of Australia's top riders.

His wins include the:

- 2009 Turnbull Stakes on Efficient.
- 2013 Caulfield Cup on Fawkner for Robert Hickmott
- 2016 Caulfield Cup on Jameka for Ciaron Maher.

He has also ridden in the Melbourne Cup:

- 16th in 2008 on Red Lord for Anthony Cummings
- 8th in 2009 on C'est La Guerre for John Sadler
- 4th in 2010 on Zipping for Robert Hickmott
- 18th in 2012 on Sanagas for Bart Cummings
- 6th in 2013 on Fawkner for Robert Hickmott
- 10th in 2014 on Fawkner for Robert Hickmott
- 15th in 2016 on Jameka for Ciaron Maher.
