= Greg Childs =

British Children's Media consultant

Gregory Stuart Childs OBE is a British Children's Media consultant.

== Career ==
He was the producer of the British television show, Record Breakers, for ten years from 1988 to 1998.

In 1998 he launched the first internet services for Children's BBC and in 2001, he headed the launch team for the BBC Children's channels, CBBC and CBeebies, while also supporting the launch of interactive television services associated with those brands.

In 2004, Childs became an independent consultant in children's cross-media content and delivery. He went on to co-found the Showcomotion Children's Media Conference which took place each summer in Sheffield (2004–2009). In 2010 this became the Children's Media Conference which continues annually in July. Childs was instrumental in the launch of the CITV Children's Channel and worked with the Al Jazeera Children's Channel from 2007–2010.

He was Head of Studies (Interactive and Transmedia) at the German Akademie für Kindermedien until 2019 and was a founding member of the Executive Committee of the media campaign organisation, Save Kids' TV. In 2010 Childs became a Fellow of the Royal Society of Arts in recognition of his services to children's rights and culture. In 2012 Childs took on the role of Director of Save Kids' TV's successor organisation, The Children's Media Foundation.

Childs was appointed Officer of the Order of the British Empire (OBE) in the 2022 New Year Honours for services to international trade and the children's media sector.
