= Green Moon =

Irish-bred Thoroughbred racehorse

- Sire: Montjeu
- Grandsire: Sadler's Wells
- Dam: Green Noon
- Damsire: Green Tune
- Sex: Stallion
- Foaled: 16 February 2007
- Country: Ireland
- Colour: Bay
- Breeder: Goldsmith Bloodstock
- Owner: Ben & Annabel Goldsmith; Lloyd Williams
- Trainer: Harry Dunlop; Robert Hickmott
- Record: 36: 7–4–0
- Earnings: A$5,382,996

Major wins
- Fairway Stakes (2010); Newcastle Gold Cup (2011); Blamey Stakes (2012); Turnbull Stakes (2012); Melbourne Cup (2012)

Awards
- Australian Champion Stayer (2011/12)
- Last updated on 6 November 2012

Green Moon is a Thoroughbred racehorse bred in Ireland and trained in Australia, and owned by Australian businessman Lloyd Williams. He won the 2012 Melbourne Cup, ridden by Brett Prebble and trained by Robert Hickmott. The horse was originally to be ridden in the cup by Damien Oliver, but Oliver was dropped by Williams, the owner, after being accused of illegal betting.

== Background ==
Sired by Montjeu, Green Moon was owned by the Goldsmith family and trained by Harry Dunlop. Then he was sold to Lloyd Williams in 2010.

== Racing career ==
Green Moon started his career in England with trainer Harry Dunlop. After two placings as a two-year-old in 2009, he won his first three starts as a three-year-old, including a listed race. Three unplaced runs followed before he was purchased by Lloyd Williams and sent to Australia.

Green Moon's first Australian campaign was in the spring of 2011. He rose to prominence when winning the Newcastle Gold Cup after a hard run, and lived up to that promise when running second in the Caulfield Cup. However, he failed to qualify for the Melbourne Cup when being well-beaten in the Lexus Stakes. Returning the following autumn, he won the Blamey Stakes over 1600m in his only start that campaign, confirming his status as a major contender for the 2012 Melbourne Cup.

Green Moon's 2012 spring campaign started well, with a narrow defeat in the Dato Tan Chin Nam Stakes and a win in the Turnbull Stakes, making him one of the favourites in both the Cox Plate and Melbourne Cup. However, after a disappointing seventh in the Cox Plate, his odds drifted in the Melbourne Cup, eventually starting at $22 on the tote. In the Melbourne Cup, he settled seventh in an on-pace-dominated race, before running clear early in the straight and holding out second-placed Fiorente by one length.
