= Jamie Mott =

Australian jockey

Jamie Mott (born 1988) is an Australian jockey based in Victoria.

Mott comes from a horse-racing family. His father, Daryl Mott, was a jockey in Victoria, his grandfather Des was a jumps jockey, and his grandmother Janet Mott was a trainer at Geelong. Jamie began his career apprenticed to Janet. Daryl's last winner as a jockey was Toy Machine, trained by Janet, at a meeting at Mortlake in July 2003; Toy Machine was Jamie's first winner, at Colac in January 2004.

Mott is tall for a jockey, at 181 cm (5 feet 11 inches), and has sometimes had trouble keeping his weight down, which has led to periods when he has been unable to ride in flat races. He has sometimes ridden in jumps races. Since his marriage to Carol-Anne Brassil, from Ireland, and the birth of their two sons, he has kept a steady 56 kilograms riding weight, but he has been able to get down to 54.5 kilograms.

Mott rode his first Group One winner in the 2022 Sir Rupert Clarke Stakes on Callsign Mav and his second on Roch 'N' Horse in the Champions Sprint a few weeks later. He won the Victorian Jockeys' Premiership in 2025-26 with 128 winners. As of late August 2026, he has ridden 1,791 winners, including four in Group One races.
