= Dunaden =

French-bred Thoroughbred racehorse

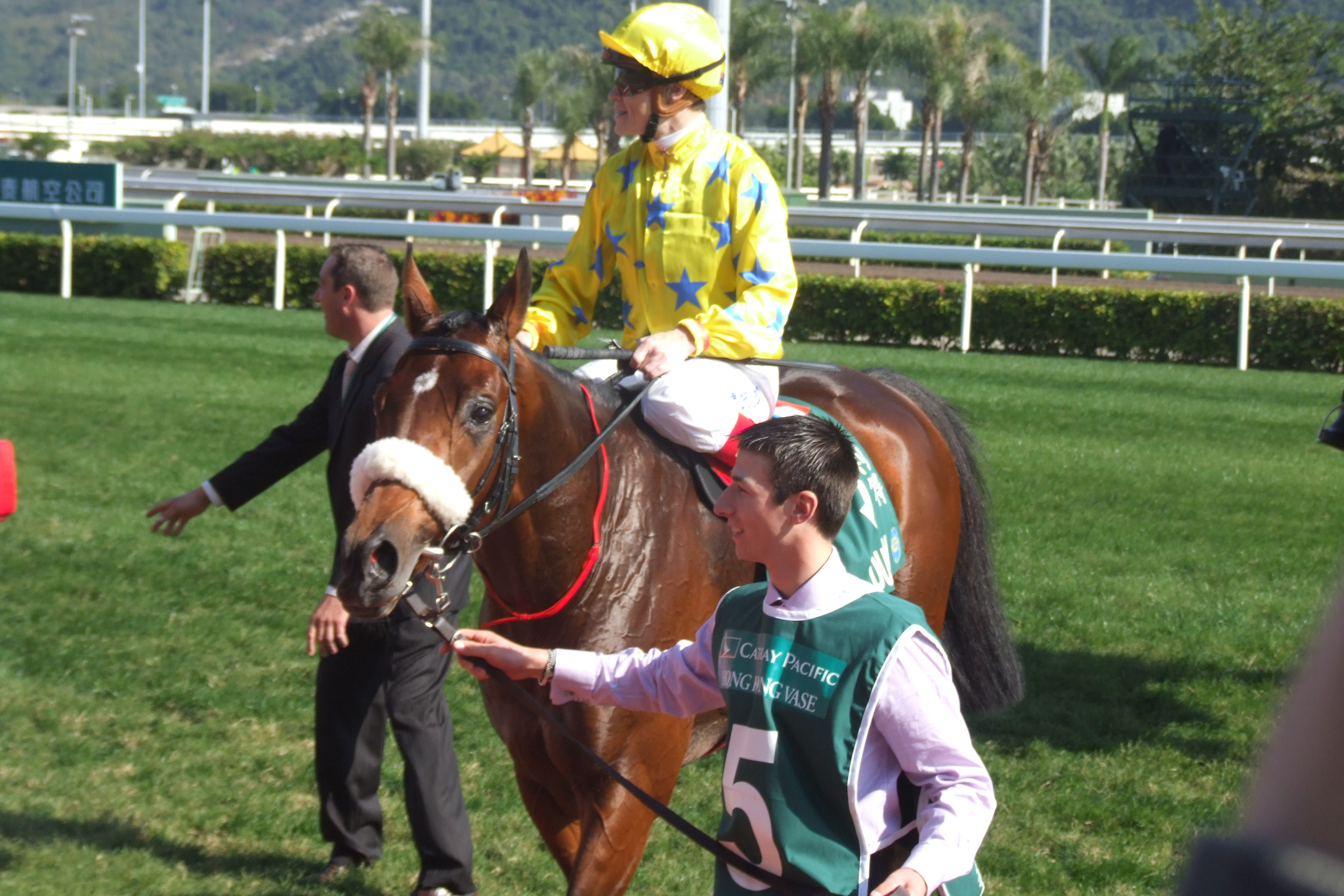
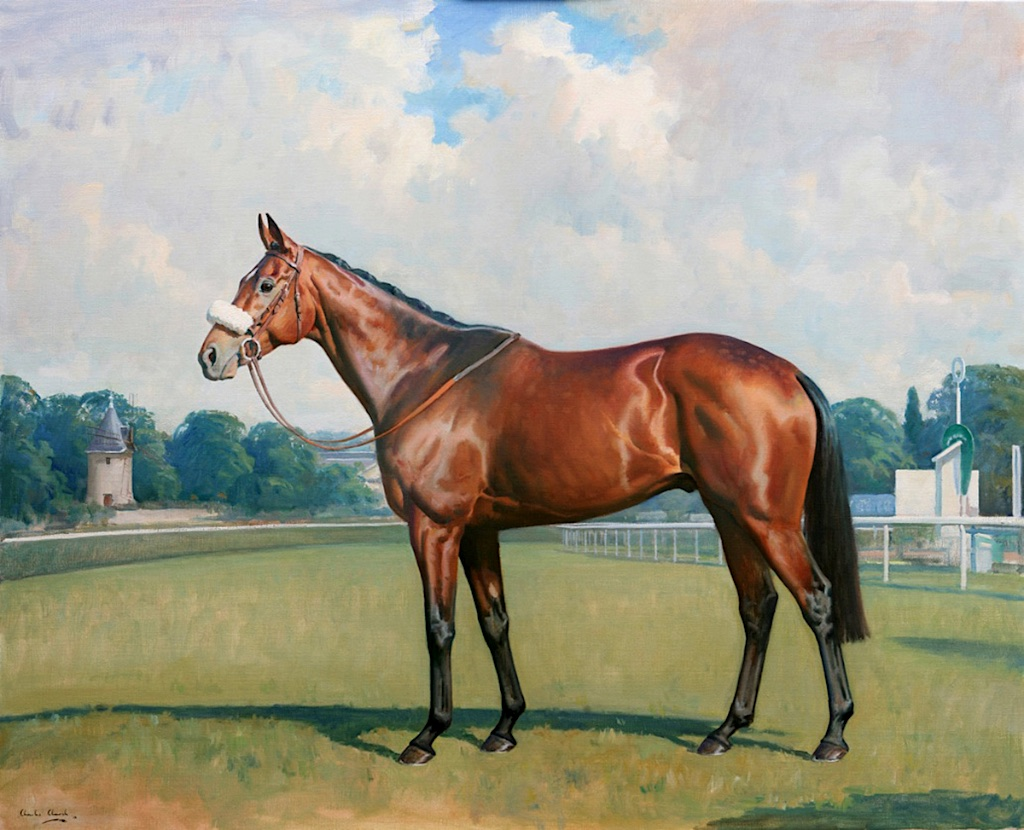
- Dunaden won 2011 Hong Kong Vase Dunaden: 2011 Melbourne Cup winner, painted by Charles Church
- Sire: Nicobar
- Dam: La Marlia
- Sex: Stallion
- Foaled: 26 February 2006
- Died: 30 April 2019 (aged 13)
- Country: France
- Colour: Bay
- Breeder: Comte E Decazes
- Owner: Pearl Bloodstock Pty
- Trainer: Doris Smith; Richard Gibson; Mikel Delzangles
- Record: 46: 10–11–8
- Earnings: £5,271,584

Major wins
- Prix de Barbeville (2011); Geelong Cup (2011); Melbourne Cup (2011); Hong Kong Vase (2011); Caulfield Cup (2012)

Awards
- Australian Champion Stayer (2011/12)

Dunaden (26 February 2006 – 30 April 2019) was a French-trained Thoroughbred racehorse. He won the 2011 Melbourne Cup, ridden by Christophe Lemaire, trained by Mikel Delzangles. The horse was owned by Sheikh Fahad al Thani and managed by David Redvers. He was the first horse to win the Hong Kong Vase after winning the Melbourne Cup.

== Early life and racing career ==
The horse was purchased for €1,500 as a foal at the Arqana mixed December sale in France in 2006.

The foal was purchased by Dutch owner/breeder Jetty van der Hulst and grew up at her stud in Nederweert (The Netherlands). As a 3-year-old he was claimed out of her stable after winning in France.

Dunaden showed his Melbourne Cup credentials in early 2011 with a win in the Prix de Barbeville and a second in the Prix Vicomtesse Vigier. He prepared for the Melbourne Cup in Australia by winning the Geelong Cup. In the Melbourne Cup, he settled back in the running and finished down the middle of the track, hitting the line alongside Red Cadeaux in the closest photo-finish ever in the Melbourne Cup, winning by 5–10 cm. He went on to win the prestigious Hong Kong Vase a few weeks later with Red Cadeaux coming home in third.

On 20 October 2012 Dunaden maintained his undefeated run in Australian races with a win in the 2012 Caulfield Cup, following an outstanding ride from jockey Craig Williams. In doing so, Dunaden became the first horse to win the Caulfield Cup from wider than barrier 15 (starting from barrier 18), as well as the first horse to win after being the original horse allotted with the top weight at acceptances (58 kg). On 1 May 2019. Dunaden died from a paddock accident at the Overbury Stud in England.

== Stud record ==
Dunaden is sired by Nicobar, of the rare Byerley Turk sire line. Dunaden retired to Overbury Stud in 2014. His first progeny began racing as 2-year-olds in 2018.

Overbury Stud offered prizemoney premiums of up to sixty-four percent for all Dunaden first-crop race winners during their two and three year-old season.

Dunaden stood for a service fee of £3000, on October First, Standing Live Foal terms.

Dunaden's first foals, in 2016, sold for an average price of 9,401 English Guineas.

== Pedigree ==
Pedigree of Dunaden (FR), bay stallion, 2006
Sire Nicobar (GB) 1997	Indian Ridge (IRE); 1985	Ahonoora (GB); 1975	Lorenzaccio
Sire Nicobar (GB) 1997	Indian Ridge (IRE); 1985	Ahonoora (GB); 1975	Helen Nichols
Sire Nicobar (GB) 1997	Indian Ridge (IRE); 1985	Hillbrow (GB); 1975	Swing Easy
Sire Nicobar (GB) 1997	Indian Ridge (IRE); 1985	Hillbrow (GB); 1975	Golden City
Sire Nicobar (GB) 1997	Duchess of Alba (GB); 1992	Belmez (USA); 1987	El Gran Senor
Sire Nicobar (GB) 1997	Duchess of Alba (GB); 1992	Belmez (USA); 1987	Grace Note
Sire Nicobar (GB) 1997	Duchess of Alba (GB); 1992	Juliette Marny (GB); 1972	Blakeney
Sire Nicobar (GB) 1997	Duchess of Alba (GB); 1992	Juliette Marny (GB); 1972	Set Free
Dam La Marlia (FR) 1997	Kaldounevees (FR); 1991	Kaldoun (FR); 1975	Caro
Dam La Marlia (FR) 1997	Kaldounevees (FR); 1991	Kaldoun (FR); 1975	Katana
Dam La Marlia (FR) 1997	Kaldounevees (FR); 1991	Safaroa (FR); 1978	Satingo
Dam La Marlia (FR) 1997	Kaldounevees (FR); 1991	Safaroa (FR); 1978	Traverse Afar
Dam La Marlia (FR) 1997	La Rotunda (FR); 1993	Romildo (GB); 1980	Busted
Dam La Marlia (FR) 1997	La Rotunda (FR); 1993	Romildo (GB); 1980	Caprera
Dam La Marlia (FR) 1997	La Rotunda (FR); 1993	Sugarberry (FR); 1989	Comrade in Arms
Dam La Marlia (FR) 1997	La Rotunda (FR); 1993	Sugarberry (FR); 1989	Maple Sugar
