= Zipping (horse) =

Australian-bred Thoroughbred racehorse

- Sire: Danehill
- Grandsire: Danzig
- Dam: Social Scene
- Damsire: Grand Lodge
- Sex: Gelding
- Foaled: 24 September 2001
- Died: 22 March 2022 (aged 20)
- Country: Australia
- Colour: Bay/Brown
- Owner: Mr Lloyd & Mrs Williams
- Trainer: Robert Hickmott
- Record: 45:15-3-7
- Earnings: A$4,320,195

Major wins
- Moonee Valley Cup (2006); Sandown Classic (2007, 2008, 2009, 2010); Turnbull Stakes (2010); Australian Cup (2010)

Honours
- Zipping Classic

Zipping (24 September 2001 – 22 March 2022) was an Australian champion racehorse who was notable for winning the prestigious Sandown Classic race in four consecutive years.

== Racing history ==
Zipping won his first Sandown Classic in 2007, defeating Jukebox Johnny, and Baughurst as a 6-year-old. The following year as $3.20 favourite he won a second Classic in defeating Douro Valley and Red Ruler, by 0.2 lengths. In 2009 Zipping made it three on end with his victory over the Peter Snowden trained Purple, and the 2007 Caulfield Cup winner Master O'Reilly. In 2010 Zipping in a five horse field including the David Jones Handicap winner the kiwi Ginga Dude, won his 4th Sandown Classic by 2 lengths defeating Exceptionally and Manighar. Nick Hall had the winning ride, and Zipping again started the race favourite at $1.90.

Zipping was the first horse included in the Hickmott stable and placed fourth on three occasions in the Emirates Melbourne Cup. Lloyd Williams, the owner of the horse, described him as more than an animal. He called Zipping his friend and his greatest horse in all of his twenty five years in racing.

Zipping lived at Living Legends retirement home for champion geldings in Melbourne until his death due to a paddock accident in March 2022.

== See also ==
- Repeat winners of horse races
