= Michael Rodd (jockey) =

Australian jockey

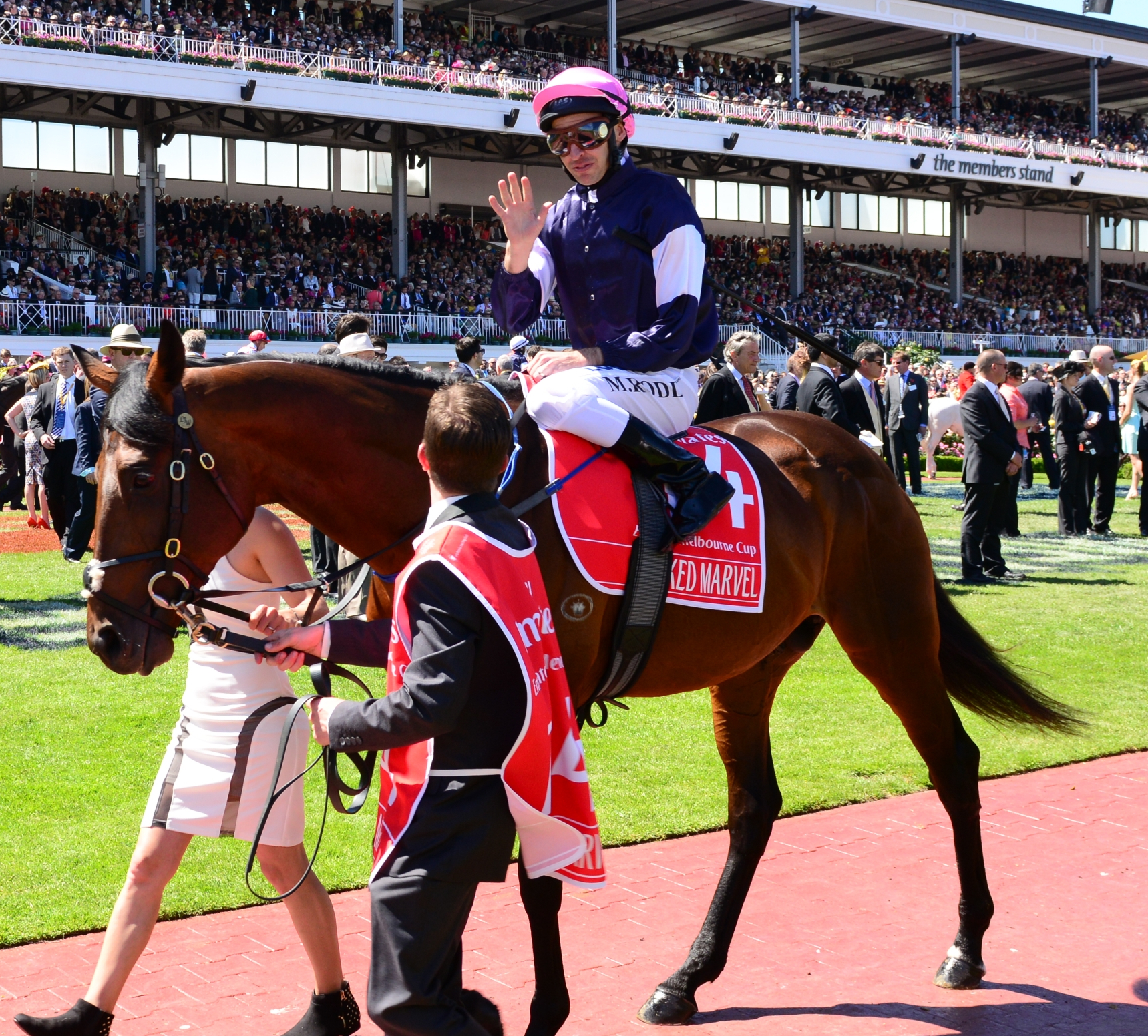
Rodd prior to the 2013 Melbourne Cup, in which he rode Masked Marvel, placing eighteenth.

Michael Rodd (born 19 January 1982 in Manly, New South Wales) is an Australian jockey who is best known for riding Efficient to victory in the 2007 Melbourne Cup.

Rodd has also been successful in the 2008 Cox Plate, riding Maldivian and in the 2006 Victoria Derby, again riding Efficient. He began racing in 2000. As of April 2023, he has ridden 1,226 winners, including 33 in Group One races, earning a combined $71.2 million in prize money.
