= Corey Brown (jockey) =

Australian jockey (born 1976)

Personal information
- Born: 15 June 1976 (age 50) Taree, New South Wales
- Occupation: Jockey

Horse racing career
- Sport: Horse racing
- Career wins: 2,466

Major racing wins
- Melbourne Cup (2009, 2017); Stradbroke Handicap (2017); Sydney Cup (2001, 2017); Doomben Cup (2017); Black Caviar Lightning (2008, 2017); Coolmore Classic (1999); AJC Derby (2005); Turnbull Stakes (2008); Canterbury Guineas (2003); Blue Diamond Stakes (2003); Epsom Handicap (2003); Spring Champion Stakes (2003); Flight Stakes (2003); The Metropolitan (2009); Doomben 10,000 (2008); TJ Smith Stakes (2008); Crown Oaks (2007)

Significant horses
- Shocking; Apache Cat; Eremein; Rekindling

Corey Brown (born 15 June 1976) is a retired Australian jockey who is best known for winning rides such as:

- Apache Cat in a string of Group 1 victories in 2008/09
- Quechua in the 2014 Singapore Gold Cup and 2015 Singapore Derby
- Rekindling in the 2017 Melbourne Cup
- Shocking in the 2009 Melbourne Cup

In a riding career extending from 1991 to 2019, Brown won 2,466 races, including 49 in Group One races.

Brown appeared as a regular host on the racing industry related television show "Off the Rails" with Greg Radley and former jockey Malcolm Johnston.
