= Robert Hickmott =

Personal information
- Full name: Robert Hickmott
- Born: 28 January 1969 (age 57)
- Original teams: Tarrawingee, Wangaratta Rovers
- Height: 186 cm (6 ft 1 in)
- Weight: 81 kg (179 lb)

Playing career
Years	Club	Games (Goals)
1990–1991	Melbourne	2 (0)

Robert Hickmott (born 28 January 1969) is an Australian racehorse trainer and former Australian rules footballer, who played for the Melbourne Football Club in the Australian Football League (AFL). In 2012, he became the first former footballer to train a Melbourne Cup-winning horse.

== Football ==
From Wangaratta, Victoria, Hickmott originally played for Tarrawingee in the Ovens & King Football League and the Wangaratta Rovers in the Ovens & Murray Football League (O&M).

He was recruited by the Essendon Football Club after starring in the Wangaratta Rovers 1988 O&M grand final win. He spent 1989 playing in Essendon's reserve side and entered the 1990 AFL Pre-season Draft where he was selected by Melbourne with the 45th pick overall.

Hickmott played two games for the club in the 1990 season, debuting against St Kilda in round 13 and playing again the following week, against North Melbourne. He played with Melbourne Football Club in their 1990 AFL Reserves grand final loss to Carlton Football Club.

Although remaining on the club's list in 1991, he did not play another senior game for the club.

Hickmott returned to play in Wangaratta Rovers' 1991 premiership side and then later played for Wodonga and Myrtleford in the mid-1990s.

== Horse racing ==
After quitting football, Hickmott moved to Murray Bridge, South Australia, joining his father, John Hickmott, in training horses. From there, he returned to Victoria to work under Colin Little, and later worked with Tony Vasil and Alan Bailey.

In 2001, racehorse owner Lloyd Williams offered him a position at his stables, which he accepted. Hickmott was heavily involved in the training of 2007 Melbourne Cup winner Efficient, although the horse was officially trained by Graeme Rogerson.

He was appointed head trainer at Williams' Macedon Lodge stables (near Mount Macedon) in 2009, and subsequently trained his first Group 1 winner, Zipping, who won the Australian Cup in 2010.

Green Moon, the winner of the 2012 Melbourne Cup, was trained by Hickmott, and also won the Turnbull Stakes in 2012. Another horse trained by Hickmott, Almandin, won the 2016 Melbourne Cup, giving Hickmott his second win as a trainer in the great race.

== See also ==
- List of Melbourne Cup winners
