= Dwayne Dunn =

Australian jockey

Dwayne Dunn (born 1973) is a retired Australian jockey who was based in Victoria. He won the Scobie Breasley Medal in 2016.

Dunn began his career in 1989. He rode his first Group One winner on Undoubtedly in the 2005 Blue Diamond Stakes at Caulfield. He holds the jockeys' record for numbers of wins in the Blue Diamond with five. He rode All Too Hard 10 times for seven wins, four of them at Group One level. He rode 2,185 winners, including 24 in Group One races. His son Dylan Dunn is also a jockey.

Dunn suffered a neck fracture and a brain injury at Moonee Valley in September 2020 when his mount Shot Of Irish reared in the starting gate. After attempting to resume riding in February 2021 he found the brain trauma was too severe and long-lasting, and in May 2021 he decided to concentrate on achieving a full recovery, leaving his riding future in doubt. The injuries eventually forced him to retire, and in 2024 he sued Racing Victoria for damages; the matter was settled confidentially out of court.
