= Kerrin McEvoy =

Australian jockey (born 1980)

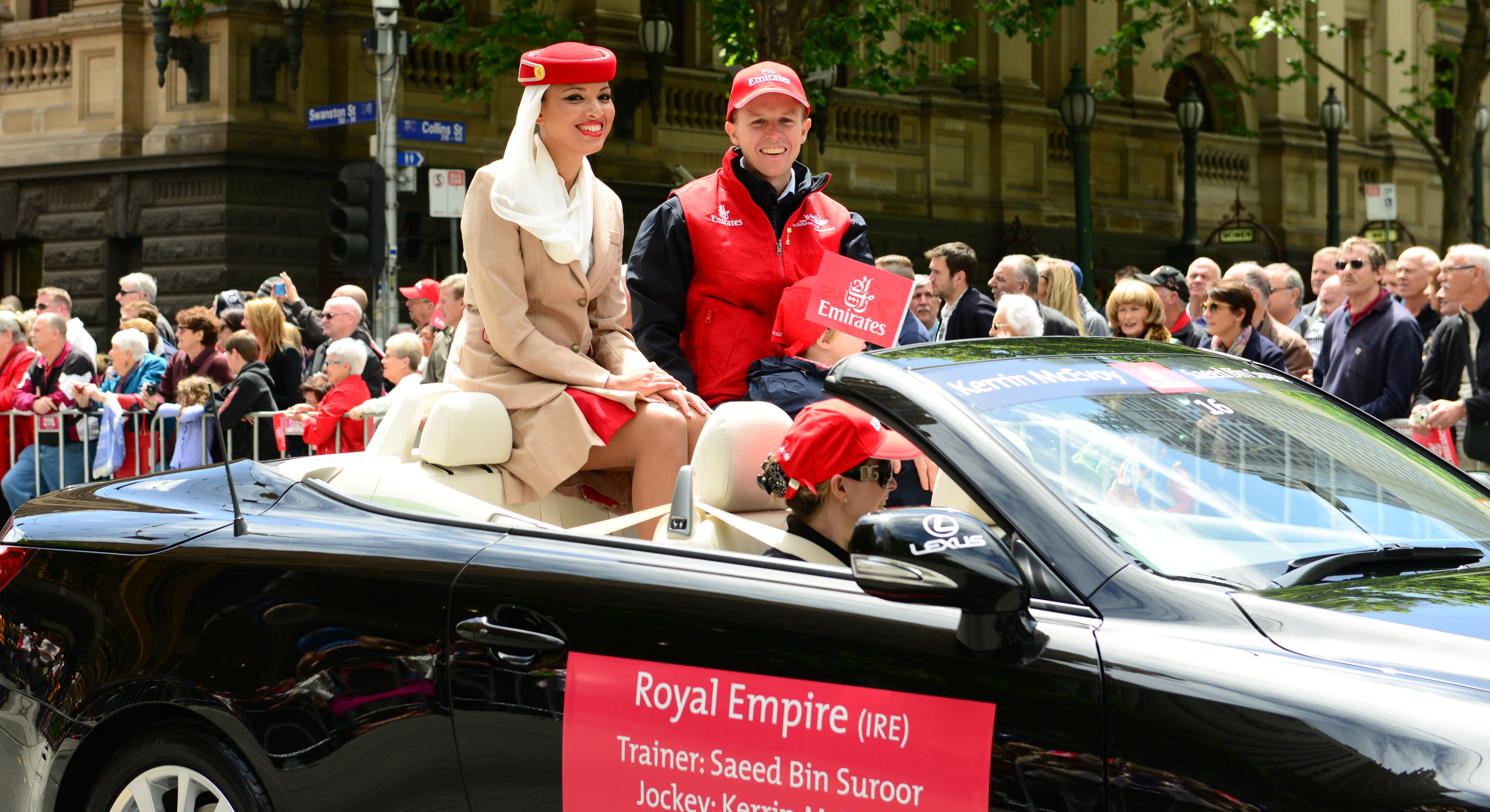
- Kerrin McEvoy at the 2013 Melbourne Cup Parade

Personal information
- Born: 28 October 1980 (age 46) Streaky Bay, South Australia
- Occupation: Jockey

Horse racing career
- Sport: Horse racing

Major racing wins
- Melbourne Cup (2000, 2016, 2018) Caulfield Cup (2008) Golden Slipper (2011) The Everest (2017, 2018, 2020)

Honours
- South Australian Racing Hall of Fame (2017)

Kerrin McEvoy (born 28 October 1980) is an Australian jockey who is best known for winning three Melbourne Cups. In Europe, McEvoy rode several big winners for Godolphin including Rule of Law in the St Leger Stakes at Doncaster in 2004 and Ibn Khaldun in the Racing Post Trophy, also at Doncaster in 2007.

McEvoy rose to fame by riding Brew to victory in the 2000 Melbourne Cup. He won his second Melbourne Cup in 2016, riding Almandin to victory, and in 2018 he won his third Melbourne Cup, riding Cross Counter to victory. He is the brother-in-law of both Melbourne Cup winners, Michelle Payne who won the Cup with Prince of Penzance in 2015 and Brett Prebble who won the Cup with Green Moon in 2012 just three years earlier.
