= Luke Nolen =

Australian jockey

Personal information
- Nickname: Trumby
- Nationality: Australian
- Born: 12 March 1980 (age 46) Manangatang, Victoria
- Occupation: Jockey
- Weight: 52 kg (115 lb)

Horse racing career
- Sport: Horse racing
- Career wins: Caulfield Guineas; W.S. Cox Plate; Golden Eagle

Significant horses
- Black Caviar, I Wish I Win, Sheza Alibi

Luke Nolen (born 12 March 1980) is an Australian jockey best known for riding mare Black Caviar to 22 of her 25 consecutive wins.

Nolen is from the rural town of Manangatang in northern Victoria. Beginning in Queensland country races, he has been riding professionally since 1998.

As of 6 December 2025, Nolen has ridden 1,992 winners, including 40 in Group One races. He won 14 of his 38 Group One winners on Black Caviar. He won the Melbourne jockeys' premiership three seasons in a row: 2009/10, 2010/11 and 2011/12.

Notable wins include:

- 2007 Cox Plate on El Segundo for Colin Little
- 2022 Golden Eagle on I Wish I Win for Peter Moody.

His best placing in the Melbourne Cup was 2nd in 2010 aboard Maluckyday for Wayne Hawkes, behind Americain.

Luke has gained the nickname "Trumby" through the racing industry.
