= Damien Oliver =

Australian thoroughbred racing jockey (born 1972)

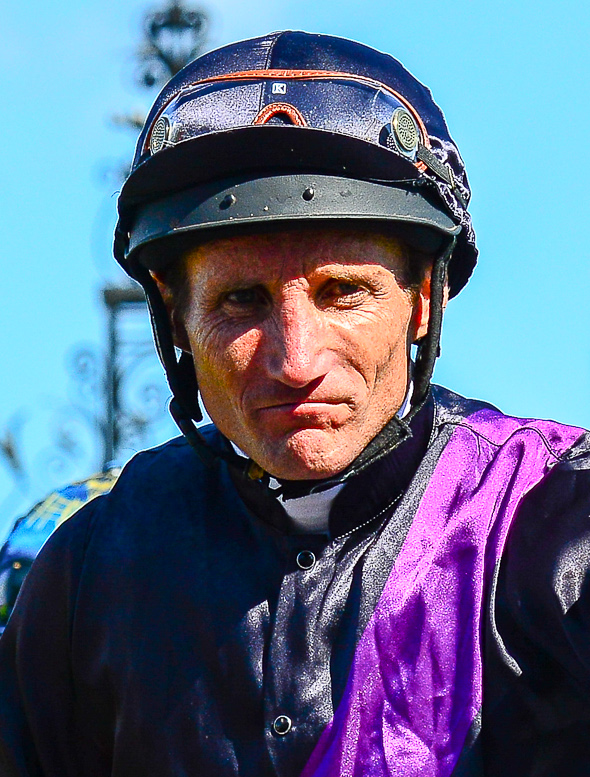
- Damien Oliver after winning the 2014 Darley Australian Cup

Personal information
- Nickname: Ollie
- Nationality: Australian
- Born: 22 June 1972 (age 54) Perth, Western Australia
- Occupation: Professional jockey
- Spouse: Trish
- Children: 3

Horse racing career
- Sport: Horse racing

Honours
- Australian Racing Hall of Fame

Significant horses
- Doriemus; Media Puzzle; Fiorente
- Updated on 7 November 2013

Damien Oliver (born 22 June 1972) is an Australian retired thoroughbred racing jockey. Oliver comes from a racing family; his father Ray Oliver had a successful career until his death in a race fall during the 1975 Kalgoorlie Cup in Western Australia. In 2008, Oliver was inducted into the Australian Racing Hall of Fame. In August 2023 he announced that he would retire at the end of that year's spring carnival.

== Early life and education ==
Damien Oliver was born on 22 June 1972 in Perth, Western Australia. His father, Ray Oliver, was a jockey who died in Kalgoorlie from falling off his horse when Damien was three years old. As a child, he attended Byford Primary School in Byford, Western Australia.

== Racing career ==
Oliver's riding career started in 1988, and he completed his apprenticeship with his stepfather Lindsey Rudland and Lee Freedman. His first win as an apprentice was in March 1988 on Mr. Gudbud, at Bunbury, Western Australia and his first feature race win was the Group 2 AJC Warwick Stakes in 1989. Unfortunately he suffered a series of injuries including a broken spine in March 2005, sustained in a fall at Moonee Valley. He returned to riding after that back injury and rode the Japanese horse Pop Rock in the 2006 Melbourne Cup, which finished second to stablemate Delta Blues. In the 2007 Melbourne Cup, he placed second to Efficient on English horse Purple Moon.

Oliver has won the Melbourne Cup three times: on Doriemus (1995), Media Puzzle (2002), and Fiorente (2013); the Caulfield Cup on Mannerism (1992), Paris Lane (1994), Doriemus (1995), and Sky Heights (1999); the Cox Plate on Dane Ripper (1997) and Northerly (2001); and the Blue Diamond Stakes on Alinghi (2004). He was also the regular rider of Lee Freedman's champion sprinter Schillaci (1991–95) and top filly Alinghi (2003–05). In the 2007 Golden Slipper, Oliver completed the grand slam of Australian racing by winning the two-year-old race on the John Hawkes trained Forensics.

From 1989 (his first ride) to 2023 (his final ride) in the Melbourne Cup, Oliver was only absent from three editions of the race, 2005 due to injury, 2017 due to suspension and 2022 due to his ride Durston being withdrawn from the race with injury.

On 22 September 2010, Oliver pulled out of rides at a Sandown meeting, while helping police with their inquiries into a criminal investigation.

In 2011, The Cup, a biopic starring Stephen Curry, was released. It covered Oliver's relationships with his family and how he overcame the death of his brother Jason Oliver and won the 2002 Melbourne Cup two weeks later on Media Puzzle.

In 2013, Oliver won his third Melbourne Cup riding the favourite, Fiorente. This ride was also his 100th Group 1 win. The victory was trainer Gai Waterhouse's first victory in the Melbourne Cup.

In the lead-up to the 2023 Melbourne Spring Carnival, Damien announced his intention to retire at its completion.

His last race-day was at Ascot in Perth on 16 December 2023. He had seven rides and won all of his last three races with Devine Belief, Magnificent Andy and Munhamek. His final ride and win on Munhamek was in a race named after him, the Damien Oliver Gold Rush over 1400m.

In his career Oliver had ridden 3189 winners, including 129 in Group One races. He holds the Australian record for the number of Group One victories.

== Illegal betting and suspension ==
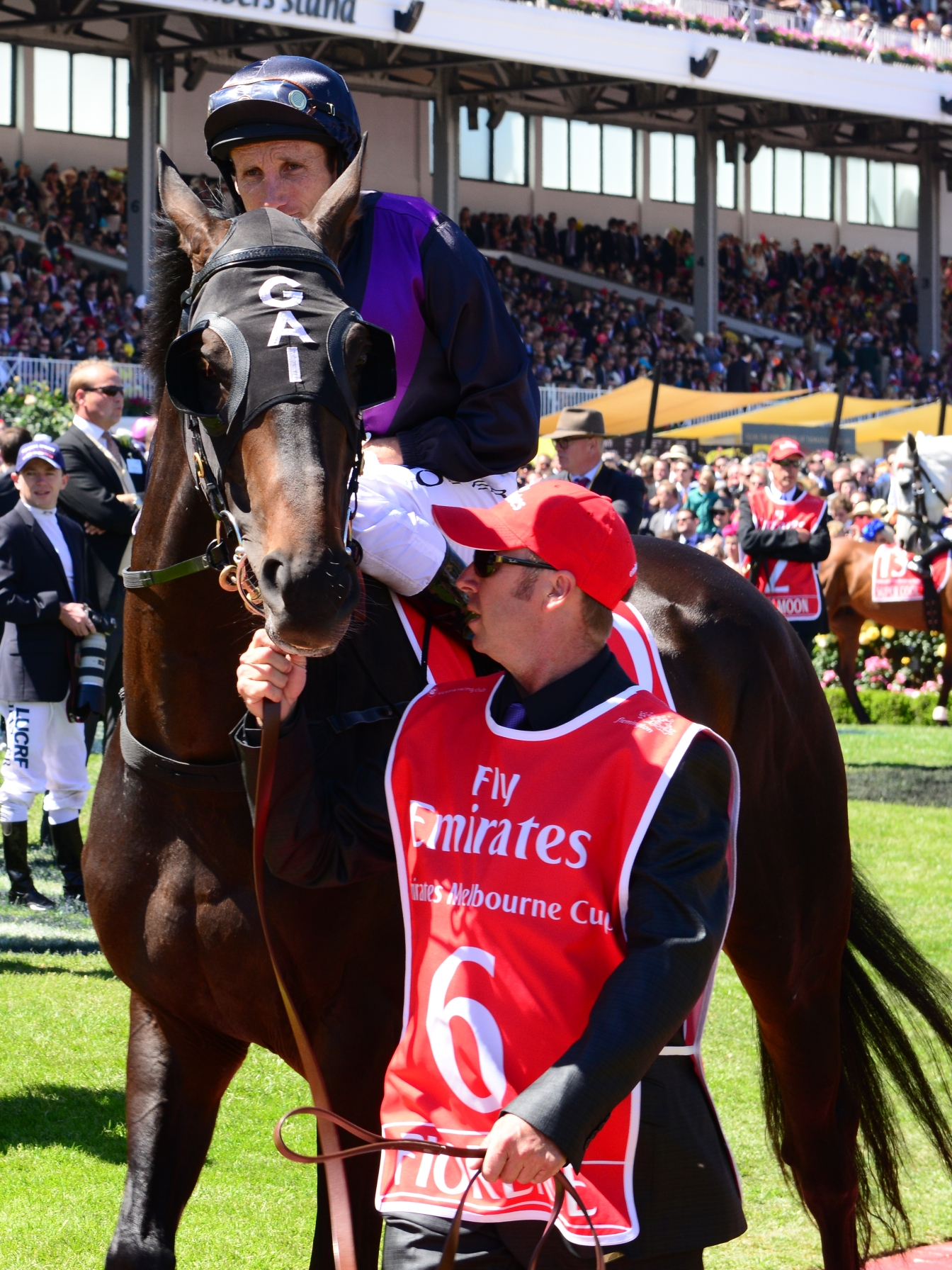
Damien Oliver mounted on Fiorente at the 2013 Melbourne Cup.

In 2012, Oliver was accused of placing a $10,000 bet on a rival horse, Miss Octopussy, to beat a horse he was riding, Europa Point, in the same race at Moonee Valley Racecourse on 1 October 2010. Europa Point finished sixth but stewards had no issue with the way Oliver rode his horse, saying there was no change from the usual racing pattern or any other reason to doubt the integrity of the ride. It was subsequently revealed that he made an $11,000 profit with his bet. The then alleged incident was not discovered until 2012, during an investigation into the racing industry. He was subsequently dropped from the Lloyd Williams-owned Green Moon in the 2012 Cox Plate and 2012 Melbourne Cup although he did ride in the 2012 Cup Carnival, a move that reportedly annoyed some members of the public and racing industry. He won the Victoria Derby and Emirates Stakes.

On 13 November 2012, Oliver was formally charged with the alleged offence. On 20 November 2012 he was banned for eight months for the illegal bet and received an additional two months' suspension for using a mobile phone in the area of the jockeys room against the rules. He was unable to ride in races until 13 September 2013.

On his return to race riding, Oliver immediately tasted success culminating in his Melbourne Cup winning ride. There has been discussion on whether Oliver's sentence was adequate and the sentence for this offence has increased significantly since. Had it occurred in 2013, he would have been suspended for two years for the same offence.

== Awards ==
Damien Oliver has won Racing Victoria's Scobie Breasley Medal fourteen times (1996, 1999, 2001, 2002, 2003, 2004, 2005, 2010, 2013, 2014, 2015, 2018, 2019 and 2020). The award recognises excellence in race riding on Melbourne racetracks and is voted on the day of racing by stewards in a 3:2:1 format for the race ride of the day.

In 2014, he won the inaugural Roy Higgins Medal as the winner of the Victorian jockeys' premiership.

Oliver won the 2014/15 Melbourne Jockeys' Premiership after riding 60 race winners. It was Oliver's 10th win of the award, trailing only Roy Higgins and Bill Duncan who have won the award 11 times.

In 2023, the Group 2 Linlithgow Stakes was renamed The Damien Oliver in his honour. Oliver himself had previously won the race twice in 2009 and 2011, aboard Eagle Falls and Sister Madly, respectively.

== Personal life ==
Oliver is married to Trish, and they have two daughters called Niali and Zara; and one son called Luke. They live in the Melbourne suburb of Port Melbourne.

Oliver's elder brother Jason was also a jockey; he died on 29 October 2002 after a fall at Belmont Park Racecourse, Western Australia, when a young horse he was riding broke both front legs and fell during a race trial. The horse was found to have been administered phenylbutazone prior to the trial and this was thought to be a contributing factor in the accident.

Oliver supports the West Coast Eagles in the Australian Football League.

== Group 1 winners (129) ==
- Adelaide Cup (1) – Sheer Kingston (1999)
- AJC Derby (1) – Don Eduardo (2002)
- All Aged Stakes (3) – Hurricane Sky (1995); Danleigh (2009); Tivaci (2017)
- Auckland Cup (1) – Zavite (2010)
- Australasian Oaks (4) – Mannerism (1991); Episode (1999); Tully Thunder (2002); Princess Jenni (2019)
- Australian Cup (1) – Fiorente (2014)
- Australian Guineas (3) – Flying Spur (1996); Mr. Murphy (2001); Grunt (2018)
- Blue Diamond Stakes (1) – Alinghi (2004)
- Brisbane Cup (1) – Sheer Kingston (1999)
- Cantala Stakes (2) – Happy Trails (2012); Superstorm (2021)
- Caulfield Cup (4) – Mannerism (1992); Paris Lane (1994); Doriemus (1995); Sky Heights (1999)
- Caulfield Guineas (2) – Centro (1990); Anamoe (2021)
- Caulfield Stakes (4) – Naturalism (1993); Danewin (1995); Northerly (2001); Whobegotyou (2009)
- C F Orr Stakes (2) – Durbridge (1993); El Segundo (2007)
- Champagne Stakes (2) – Quick Star (1999); Seabrook (2018)
- Chipping Norton Stakes (1) – Casino Prince (2008)
- Coolmore Classic (1) – Porto Roca (2001)
- Cox Plate (2) – Dane Ripper (1997); Northerly (2001)
- Doomben Cup (1) – Sarrera (2008)
- Doomben 10,000 (2) – Falvelon (2002); Apache Cat (2009)
- Empire Rose Stakes (3) – Hurtle Myrtle (2011); Shout The Bar (2020); Colette (2021)
- Futurity Stakes (4) – Mannerism (1992); Testa Rossa (2000); Mr. Murphy (2001); Suavito (2015)
- George Ryder Stakes (1) – Schillaci (1993)
- Golden Rose Stakes (1) - Toorak Toff (2010)
- Golden Slipper (1) – Forensics (2007)
- Kingston Town Classic (1) – Sniper's Bullet (2009)
- Lightning Stakes (5) – Schillaci (1992); Schillaci (1993); Gold Ace (1996); Testa Rossa (2000); Nicconi (2010)
- Mackinnon Stakes (5) – Paris Lane (1994); Danewin (1995); Grand Armee (2004); Glass Harmonium (2011); Happy Trails (2014)
- Makybe Diva Stakes (2) – Fawkner (2015); Grunt (2018)
- Manikato Stakes (2) – Sonic Express (1991); Dane Ripper (1998)
- Melbourne Cup (3) – Doriemus (1995); Media Puzzle (2002); Fiorente (2013)
- Newmarket Handicap (3) – Schillaci (1992); Toledo (2001); Alinghi (2005)
- New Zealand Derby (1) – So Casual (1998)
- Oakleigh Plate (2) – Schillaci (1992); Eagle Falls (2011)
- Queen Elizabeth Stakes (5) – Defier (2002); Desert War (2007); Sarrera (2008); Road To Rock (2010); Lucia Valentina (2016);
- Queen of the Turf Stakes (2) – Azkadellia (2016); Nimalee (2022)
- Queensland Derby (1) – Empires Choice (2007)
- Queensland Oaks (1) - Amokura (2023)
- Robert Sangster Stakes (3) – Alinghi (2005); Secret Agenda (2017); Spright (2019)
- South Australian Derby (1) – Zabeelionaire (2012)
- South Australian Oaks (2) – Episode (1999); Asia (2001)
- Sir Rupert Clarke Stakes (6) – Submariner (1990); Mannerism (1992); Poetic King (1994); Testa Rossa (1999); Mr. Murphy (2001); Orange County (2008)
- Stradbroke Handicap (1) – River Lad (2014)
- Sydney Cup (1) – No Wine No Song (2008)
- Tancred Stakes (2) – Blutigeroo (2007); Cedarberg (2011)
- The Galaxy (2) – Schillaci (1992); Magnus (2007)
- The Thousand Guineas (5) – Azzurro (1992); Special Harmony (2003); Alinghi (2004); Gallica (2008); Commanding Jewel (2012)
- Underwood Stakes (3) – Northerly (2001); Russian Camelot (2020); Alligator Blood (2023)
- Victoria Derby (6) – Redding (1992); Amalfi (2001); Elvstroem (2003); Fiveandahalfstar (2012); Preferment (2014); Warning (2019)
- Vinery Stud Stakes (2) – Northwood Plume (1995); Special Harmony (2004)
- VRC Oaks (7) – Northwood Plume (1994); Kensington Palace (1997); Special Harmony (2003); Jameka (2015); Miami Bound (2019); Personal (2020); Willowy (2021)
- VRC Sires' Produce Stakes (1) – Pride of Rancho (1993)
- WATC Australian Derby (1) – Dance the Day Away (1992)
- Wellington Cup (1) – Ed (1995)
- William Reid Stakes (1) – Apache Cat (2009)
- Winterbottom Stakes (1) – Voodoo Lad (2018)
- Zabeel Classic (1) – Zonda (2001)
