= 1973 Melbourne Cup =

Edition of the Melbourne Cup

- Melbourne Cup
- Location: Flemington Racecourse
- Date: 6 Nov 1973
- Distance: 2 miles
- Winning horse: Gala Supreme
- Winning time: 3:19.50
- Final odds: 9/1
- Jockey: Frank Reys
- Trainer: Ray Hutchins
- Owner: J. P. Curtain
- Surface: Turf
- Attendance: 103,170

The 1973 Melbourne Cup was a two-mile handicap horse race which took place on Tuesday, 6 November 1973 at Melbourne's Flemington Racecourse.

This was the 113th edition of the race. The race was won by Gala Supreme, a Victorian-bred thoroughbred trained by Ray Hutchins and ridden by Frank Reys. Gala Supreme was the first Victorian-bred horse to win the Melbourne Cup since Wodalla in the 1953 Melbourne Cup. The jockey Frank Reys was the first, and currently only Indigenous Australian jockey to win the prestigious Melbourne Cup. Frank Reys upon winning was presented a miniature Melbourne Cup trophy, this was the first year the Victoria Racing Club (VRC) presented a trophy to the winning jockey.

== Field ==
This is the full field that contested the 1973 Melbourne Cup.

Place	Horse	Trainer	Jockey	SP
1st	Gala Supreme	Ray Hutchins	Frank Reys	9/1
2nd	Glengowan	J. W. Harris	Noel Harris	5/2 fav
3rd	Daneson	F. Penfold	Brian Gilders	16/1
4th	Golden Sam	Arthur Didham	Midge Didham	16/1
5th	Mon Vin		Pat Trotter	250/1
6th	Gala Red		Stan Aitken	250/1
7th	Magnifique	Eric Temperton	Brian Andrews	8/1
8th	Australasia	C L Beechley	R. Mallyon	9/1
9th	Swell Time	W C (Bill) Winder	Gary Willets	10/1
10th	Air Voyager	S A Brown	R. McLeish	500/1
11th	Narthanya		Tom Torpy	125/1
12th	Dayana	Bart Cummings	Steve Burridge	7/1
13th	Brugan		T. Finger	200/1
14th	Lord Ben	Dr Geoff Chapman	R. Bradley	100/1
15th	Mr Expensive	E C Stanton	J. Duggan	16/1
16th	Peg's Pride	W J Bromby	David Peake	20/1
17th	Red Hope	A F Honeychurch	G. Duyrca	16/1
18th	Campanello	T W Hill	H. White	33/1
19th	Tavel	E W Judd	M. Goreham	66/1
20th	Mcdaway		R. B. Martin	50/1
21st	Audaciter	Gary Lee	Herb Rauhihi	100/1
22nd	Land Lover		R. Setches	125/1
23rd	Disa		R. Durcy	350/1
24th	Strike Again	W C (Bill) Winder	N. Riordan	25/1

== See also ==
- Melbourne Cup
- List of Melbourne Cup winners
- Victoria Racing Club
