= Ladies' Day =

Ladies' Day may refer to:

- Ladies' Day (baseball), a promotional event in Major League Baseball during the 20th century
- Ladies' Day (film), a 1943 film by Leslie Goodwins

== Related ==
- Ascot Gold Cup, held on the third day of the Royal Ascot races which is unofficially called "Ladies' Day"
- Ladies Day Vase, a Thoroughbred horse race for mares held at Caulfield Racecourse in Melbourne, Australia

== See also ==
- Ladies' Night (disambiguation)
