= Burrumbeet Cup =

- Location: Burrumbeet racecourse
- Inaugurated: 1891
- Race type: Thoroughbred
- Sponsor: Pacific Fuel Solutions

Race information
- Distance: 1,800 metres (8.9 furlongs)
- Surface: Turf
- Qualification: Benchmark 78
- Weight: Handicap
- Purse: $40,000 (2026)

The Burrumbeet Cup is a thoroughbred horse race, held under handicap conditions over a distance of 1800 metres at the Burrumbeet racecourse, Burrumbeet, Victoria, Australia on New Year's Day every year. It is a prestigious race, especially sought after by Ballarat Horse Trainers.

The Burrumbeet Park & Windermere Racing Club (BP&WRC) administer racing at Burrumbeet under the jurisdiction of Racing Victoria and committee members are volunteers. President of the BP & WRC is Rod McKinnon and club secretary is Paul Brumby.

== History ==
Charlie Coglan, who received an Order of Australia medal in 1998 for his services to racing in Burrumbeet and Ballarat, was president for 49 years from 1954 to 2003, the longest term at any Victorian racing club.

The 2014 event was won by 8 lengths by Heisman in a time of 1:49.43. Heisman was part owned by many of the Burrumbeet Park & Windermere Racing Club committee members, and directly after the Cup presentations, sixteen owners of Heisman all donated $50 each to raise $800 for Cystic fibrosis. The Cup winning rider Harry Coffey - who has cystic fibrosis - rode three of the seven winners on 2014 Burrumbeet Cup day.

Petrogas Regional became the Burrumbeet Cup sponsor from 2015 onwards after the decision by Scott Petroleum to end their Burrumbeet Cup sponsorship following the running of the 2014 Burrumbeet Cup.

The 2020 edition of the Cup was the 130th running of the race. Prize money for the 2020 Burrumbeet Cup was $25,000.

== Race results ==
The following are recent winners of the Cup.

Year	Winner	Trainer(s)	Jockey	Weight	Time
2026	Station One	Liam Howley	Jack Hill	59.5	
2025	Friday At Five	Henry Dwyer, Ballarat	Neil Farley	55.0	1:51.55
2024	Ziggi Rocks	Melody Cunningham, Ballarat	Sarah Field (A3)	57.0	1:50.58
2023	Ashy Boy	Patrick Kearney, Ballarat	Logan McNeil (A)	55.0	1:49.75
2022	Under Oath	Henry Dwyer, Ballarat	Melissa Julius	56.5	1:49.23
2021	Diplomac Jack	Thomas Carberry, Ballarat	Neil Farley	56.0	1:50.67
2020	Not To Know	Mitchell Freedman, Ballarat	Jarrod Lorensini	56.0	1:50.87
2019	Koolama Bay	Clinton McDonald, Caulfield	Stan Tsaikos	55.0	1:51.95
2018	Vlanden	Austy Coffey	Harry Coffey	60.0	1:50.36
2017	Unfurl	Darren Weir	Jack Hill	55.0	1:53.75
2016	Treasure Map	Michael Sell	Chelsea Jokic	55.0	1:51.71
2015	Asset Hound	Glenn & Barry James, Ballarat	Brandon Stockdale	52.0	1:50.8
2014	Heisman	Darren Weir	Harry Coffey	55.0	1:49.4
2013	Gottino	Ken Moore	Wayne Davis	57.5	1:50.7
2012	Tube	Damien Williams	Damian Lane	58.0	1:49.6
2011	A Grade	Mark Lewis	Garry Murphy	54.0	1:49.4
2010	Blue Collar Jack	Ken Keys	Sebastian Murphy	58.0	1:51.6
2009	Silk Wind	A Purcell	C Lloyd	56.0	1:50.7
2008	Freight Carrier	Sue Murphy	Roger Booth	55.0	1:51.1
2007	Skalaad	Terry Kelly	Brady Cross	56.5	1:56.4
2006	Surfie Pete	Darren Weir	Sebastian Murphy	55.0	1:50.3
2005	Surfie Pete	Darren Weir	Garry Murphy	58.0	1:50.4
2004	More Business	A Robinson	N Smerdon	52.5	1:50.7
2003	Our Strike Breaker	S Murphy	C Robertson	58.0	1:55.6
2002	El Edicion	K Keys	S Aitken	57.0	1:52.7
2001	Sylvan Heights	B James	W Bones	55.0	1:52.5
2000	Another Chance	B Keirl	S Ridler	58.0	1:51.1

The 1986 Cup was won by Dream Ruler
