= Frank Reys =

Aboriginal Australian jockey

- Born: c.1931 North Queensland, Australia
- Died: 1984 (age 53); Melbourne, Victoria, Australia
- Occupation: Jockey
- Spouse: Noeline
- Children: Christopher, Shelley, Debra

Frank Reys (c.1931–1984) was an Aboriginal Australian jockey. He was the second Indigenous Australian jockey to win the prestigious Melbourne Cup when, in 1973, he rode to victory on Gala Supreme.

Reys' career began in Northern Queensland. He raced in North Queensland, Brisbane, Sydney, Melbourne, and country Victoria, winning his first ride in 1948 as a 16-year-old. In his career as a jockey he had 1,330 winning rides, made more impressive by the fact that there was only one metropolitan and one regional race meeting per week in those days. His 1973 Melbourne Cup win was his last. In winning his last race at 45 years of age in 1976, he bookended his career with winners.

== Heritage ==
Frank Reys' father was Filipino and his mother Aboriginal, of the Dyirbal people of Northern Queensland. However, he was widely reported as Filipino only throughout his career. Many believed that it would have hindered his prospects had he discussed his Aboriginal heritage openly in a time of racial discrimination and legislative limitations. Frank's daughter Shelley Reys once said: "My father was one of fourteen children. It was a different time in those days, a time where Indigenous heritage was not valued as it is today. People were marginalised simply on the basis of race and colour. Dad was proud of [his parents'] Aboriginal and Filipino heritage. Both parents made their mark in shaping who he was, as too his many brothers and sisters."

Reys' place in history as the first Aboriginal jockey to win the Melbourne Cup has been contested by some, on the basis that he was preceded by John Cutts on Archer in the first Melbourne Cup in 1861, and by Peter St Albans on Briseis in the Melbourne Cup of 1876. Neither of these jockeys, however, was Aboriginal, despite the legends that have risen up around them.

== Early years ==
Frank Reys was born in about 1931, one of 14 children, 8 boys and 6 girls. His father, who had immigrated to North Queensland before Frank was born, was a Filipino labourer and cook who worked on farms in North Queensland – inland from Cairns. Frank was born of his father's second relationship, and he was the first child of nine to his Aboriginal mother. Frank and his brothers would round up brumbies (wild horses), and break them in, then race in contests between themselves. Frank won most of the races, although one of his brothers did win in amateur events. He loved to ride, and progressed to riding at Cairns in gymkhanas and pony races before becoming a jockey.

Reys was a teenager when first indentured as an apprentice jockey in June 1949, to trainer Alfred Baker at Cairns. During his apprenticeship Reys rode about 45 winners. He began at Cannon Park Racecourse at Cairns, and at other district meetings. At a meeting at Gordonvale Reys won his first race riding a horse named Cruedon. In 1950, Bay Sure gave him his first win in Brisbane.

Later his apprenticeship was transferred to Gordon Shelley, one of Brisbane's top trainers. In his early riding years Reys worked hard to establish himself as a fully fledged jockey without the assistance of anyone but his "boss", Shelley.

== Career ==
At the end of his apprenticeship he travelled widely and became one of a few who have ridden over 1000 winners. One notable performance was in Queensland when he rode four winners in one afternoon at Cunnamulla. He won the Cunnamulla Cup on three occasions.

In 1955 Reys moved to Sydney. He won the Warwick Farm Autumn Handicap on Beaupa and rode three winners in an afternoon at the provincial racecourse Kembla Grange, Wollongong. Around 1961 Reys moved from Sydney to Melbourne and had considerable success in both the metropolitan area and at Victorian provincial meetings.

Among the highlights of his time in Victoria were:

- 25 November 1961 - Reys' best day's riding in Victoria in his racing career. He rode five winners in one afternoon at Moe.
- 1962 Reys won the Oaks Stakes at Flemington on Arctic Star - she was in Ray Hutchins' stable, for whom Reys was the stable rider.
- 15 June 1963 - At Moonee Valley Reys rode four winners.
- 13 April 1968 - Reys rode four winners at Caulfield Racecourse.
- November 1968 - Reys won the important Bendigo and Ballarat Cups.
- 22 November 1968 - Reys rode four winners at Ballarat: Wiglet, Affreux Lad, Bobalex and Green Dace.
- January 1969 - Reys won the William Reid Stakes at Moonee Valley on Crewman.

== Injuries ==
In January 1969, Reys was badly injured a few days after the William Reid Stakes. A four horse fall at Geelong resulted in a smashed pelvis and he was hospitalised for three months. After his return to riding,"Turf Monthly" magazine noted in July 1969 that he rode "with considerable success at the Victorian mid-week provincial meetings".

His family struggled financially due to all the racing he had missed due to injuries. Dual Choice, the flying filly – and later mare – won a great many races in the years 1970 to 1972. Although Reys did not ride her in all her victories, the two nevertheless developed a great affinity. In August 1973, attempting to have his first ride back in the saddle following time off from injury, Reys was involved in a car accident on the way to the course but climbed out of the wrecked car and rode Tauto to victory at Moonee Valley later that afternoon.

== Trainer ==
Trainer Ray Hutchins stood by Frank Reys after a horrible two years in which he had suffered a broken shoulder, two pelvis fractures, a broken cheek bone and a broken ankle, and earned himself the nickname "Autumn Leaves". Despite these injuries Hutchins entrusted Reys with the 1973 spring campaign of his stayer, the four-year-old gelding Gala Supreme. The two combined to win the important Caulfield Cup lead up race, the Herbert Power Stakes over 2,400m. Reys then rode Gala Supreme in the Caulfield cup two weeks later, finishing second to Swell Time. Hutchins had long before mapped out the Melbourne Cup as his mission, and after the Caulfield Cup second he prepared Gala Supreme for the Cup without a run in between.

== 1973 Melbourne Cup ==
On Tuesday 6 November 1973 Reys became the first Aboriginal jockey to ride a winner in the Melbourne Cup. Gala Supreme carrying 7 stone 10 pounds (49 kg) and Frank Reys won the Melbourne Cup at 9–1 in a time of 3.19.15. Reys and Gala Supreme then cemented their Melbourne Cup victory by winning the Herbert Power Handicap. At 41 years of age, Frank Reys was the oldest jockey with a ride in the 1973 Melbourne Cup. Gala Supreme had drawn the extreme outside barrier 24 and that clearly was the only stumbling block in Rey’s mind. Trainer Hutchins would later tell how he and Reys had numerous phone conversations after the barrier draw and discussed various riding tactics. Hutchins recalled he eventually left it up to Reys to ride the horse as he saw fit and Reys told him he’d "have Gala Supreme one off the fence in 5th or 6th position going out of the straight". Coming from the outside barrier Reys rode just as he had planned. He had Gala Supreme one off the fence, not far behind the leaders, before passing the winning post on the first lap. As the horses turned for home, Reys became buried in the pack, just behind the leaders. Two hundred metres from the winning post Reys squeezed Gala Supreme through a gap, left by the favourite, who had drifted off a straight course. It was only a narrow win, but Gala Supreme had surged home to victory. In his recollections Hutchins continued "and he went and did it – it was the perfect ride – he rode the race of his life for me."

His victory speech said, in part, "I thank my God, my prayers and my family for their encouragement. This is such a wonderful day. I kept picking myself off the ground and hoping I would win a Melbourne Cup. It’s something every Australian jockey dreams about. I still can’t believe it." Reys had three of his brothers in the crowd – Fred, Tony and Eric – to witness what was later called "one of the most stunning comebacks from adversity in Australian sporting history."

== Following years ==
Frank rode Gala Supreme in the 1974 Melbourne Cup but was 13th.

In 1976, three years after his career highlight aboard Gala Supreme, and after winning a Flemington race for his Melbourne Cup trainer Ray Hutchins, Reys announced his immediate retirement from the saddle.

== Death ==
Frank Reys died from cancer in 1984 – aged 53.

== Shelley Reys AO ==
Frank Reys is the father of Shelley Reys, who became a director of Reconciliation Australia, an advocate for Aboriginal rights, and a prominent voice on reconciliation. She was the inaugural Chair of Reconciliation Australia and Board Director for ten years (2001–2011) during which time she supported Parliament's apology to 'The Stolen Generations' and launched the first Reconciliation Action Plan (RAP). She continues to drive conversations on the nation's journey towards a reconciled nation.

In 2004 Shelley was invited to address the Board of the National Australia Day Council (NADC) to propose an Indigenous-inclusive way of marking Australia Day, the date of which represents the anniversary of British colonisation. As a result of her recommendations, Australia Day 2005 was officially launched during a sunrise ceremony at Uluru and Shelley was appointed Board member and Vice-Chairman of the NADC for ten years (2004–2014). She led national conversations about how one considers Indigeneity in the context of being Australian, and how the nation celebrates Australia Day on a local, state and national level.

Shelley has placed a First Nations lens over the work of many prominent organisations including The Fred Hollows Foundation (Vice Chairman 2003–2008), KPMG Australia (Board Director 2022–2023), Career Trackers (Board Director 2012–2013), National Centre of Indigenous Excellence (Chair, 2013–2014), YWCA of Sydney (Board Director, 2001–2004), The Parole Board of NSW (Board member 2003–2009) and Koori Radio (inaugural Board Director, 1995–1998).

She is currently the Chair of the Council for the Order of Australia (since 2022) and Board Director of the Organising Committee for the Olympic Games for Brisbane 2032 (since 2022).

For more than 30 years she has been the CEO and owner of Arrilla Indigenous Consulting, and since 2016, a joint venture with KPMG Australia. Her leadership ethos is that "commercial success and social impact can - and should - co exist." She is known to challenge leaders to create businesses where "profit and kindness go hand in hand," and to "leave no Australian behind."

Her international footprint includes her role as Australian representative at APEC in 2010 as part of the Women's Entrepreneurship Summit hosted by USA Senator Hillary Clinton. Also the Australian representative at The Global Entrepreneurship Summit in 2016 hosted by USA President Barak Obama designed to "unite the universal business spirit to better the world."

On 11 June 2012, Shelley Reys was named an Officer of the Order of Australia for "distinguished service to the Indigenous community, to reconciliation and social inclusion, and as an advocate for improved educational, health and employment opportunities for Aboriginal and Torres Strait Islander people." In October 2013, Shelley Reys was named by the Australian Financial Review as "100 Women of Influence". In July 2024, Shelley Reys was inducted into the Queensland Business Leaders Hall of Fame 'in recognition of groundbreaking contributions to the Indigenous space and reconciliation and as an influential business leader and change maker'.
