= Tofane (horse) =

New Zealand-bred thoroughbred racehorse

- Sire: Ocean Park
- Grandsire: Thorn Park
- Dam: Baggy Green
- Damsire: Galileo
- Sex: Mare
- Foaled: 12 September 2015
- Country: New Zealand
- Colour: Bay
- Breeder: Gordon Cunningham
- Owner: Ballymore Stables et al.
- Trainer: Michael Moroney
- Record: 31: 8-5-4
- Earnings: AU$3,692,470

Major wins
- Northwood Plume Stakes (2019); Begonia Belle Stakes (2019); All Aged Stakes (2020); Stradbroke Handicap (2021); Tattersall's Tiara (2021); C F Orr Stakes (2022)

Tofane (foaled 12 September 2015) is a New Zealand-bred and Australian raced thoroughbred racehorse that has one four Group One races.

== Background ==
Tofane is by the stallion Ocean Park, the winner of 5 Group One races. She was bred by Gordon Cunningham in New Zealand.

Tofane is out of the Australian mare, Baggy Green, who is a granddaughter of champion European mare, User Friendly. Baggy Green is also a half sister to Queensland Oaks winner Youngstar, and a three-quarter sister to Flight Stakes winner Funstar. Tofane is also the half-sister to No Compromise, the winner of the Group 3 N E Manion Cup.

Tofane was originally entered for the 2017 New Zealand Bloodstock yearling sale, however Cunningham removed her from the sale and retained ownership. She won an 820m trial at Te Teko and was then sold by Cunningham to owners in Australia, where she was sent to be trained by Michael Moroney at Flemington.

== Racing career ==
Tofane had her first race start as a 3-year-old when running second in a maiden race at Bendigo on the 19 March 2019. Three weeks later she started as a $1.35 favourite when winning her first race at Ballarat by three and three-quarter lengths when ridden by Damien Oliver.

In the spring of 2019, Tofane won back-to-back stakes races in the Northwood Plume Stakes and the Begonia Belle Stakes. On both occasions she was ridden by Dwayne Dunn.

Tofane won her first Group One race on the 18 April 2020 in the All Aged Stakes at Randwick. Ridden by Opie Bosson, she managed to overhaul Pierata to win by a small margin.

Tofane would not win again for over twelve months when she scored back-to-back Group One wins in the 2021 Stradbroke Handicap and the Tattersall's Tiara at Eagle Farm. On both occasions she was ridden by Craig Williams.

In February 2022 Tofane won her fourth Group One race when leading all the way to win the C F Orr Stakes at Caulfield.

== Breeding career ==
Tofane was sold for $3.1 million at the 2022 Magic Millions broodmare sale. She was purchased by Yulong Investments and was covered by stallion Written Tycoon in her first year.

== Pedigree ==
Pedigree of Tofane (NZ) 2015
Sire Ocean Park (NZ) 2008	Thorn Park (AUS); 1999	Spinning World	Nureyev
Sire Ocean Park (NZ) 2008	Thorn Park (AUS); 1999	Spinning World	Imperfect Circle
Sire Ocean Park (NZ) 2008	Thorn Park (AUS); 1999	Joy	Bluebird
Sire Ocean Park (NZ) 2008	Thorn Park (AUS); 1999	Joy	Christmas Spirit
Sire Ocean Park (NZ) 2008	Sayyida (NZ); 2000	Zabeel	Sir Tristram
Sire Ocean Park (NZ) 2008	Sayyida (NZ); 2000	Zabeel	Lady Giselle
Sire Ocean Park (NZ) 2008	Sayyida (NZ); 2000	Eastern Princess	Pompeii Court
Sire Ocean Park (NZ) 2008	Sayyida (NZ); 2000	Eastern Princess	Benazir
Dam Baggy Green (AUS) 2008	Galileo (IRE); 1998	Sadler's Wells	Northern Dancer
Dam Baggy Green (AUS) 2008	Galileo (IRE); 1998	Sadler's Wells	Fairy Bridge
Dam Baggy Green (AUS) 2008	Galileo (IRE); 1998	Urban Sea	Miswaki
Dam Baggy Green (AUS) 2008	Galileo (IRE); 1998	Urban Sea	Allegretta
Dam Baggy Green (AUS) 2008	Starspangled (IRE); 2003	Danehill	Danzig
Dam Baggy Green (AUS) 2008	Starspangled (IRE); 2003	Danehill	Razyana
Dam Baggy Green (AUS) 2008	Starspangled (IRE); 2003	User Friendly	Slip Anchor
Dam Baggy Green (AUS) 2008	Starspangled (IRE); 2003	User Friendly	Rostova
