= Gala Supreme =

Australian Thoroughbred racehorse

- Sire: Gala Crest (AUS)
- Grandsire: Gala Performance (GB)
- Dam: Smoke Fairy (AUS)
- Damsire: Talisman II (GB)
- Sex: Gelding
- Foaled: 1969
- Died: 1994
- Country: Australia
- Colour: Brown
- Owner: J P Curtain
- Trainer: R J Hutchins

Major wins
- Melbourne Cup (1973); Herbert Power Stakes (1973); N E Manion Cup (1974)
- Last updated on 14 April 2020

Gala Supreme (1969−1994) was an Australian thoroughbred racehorse who won the 1973 Melbourne Cup.

== Racing career ==
Having run second in the Caulfield Cup to the Swell Time, he overcame a wide barrier (24) to defeat the 5/2 race favourite Glengowan by half-a-length.

Throughout his career, he accumulated 40 starts, 7 wins, 6 places, 8 shows and total career earnings of $181,300.

Gala Supreme was ridden by Frank Reys the first jockey of confirmed Aboriginal descent to win the Melbourne Cup.

== Pedigree ==
Pedigree of Gala Supreme (AUS) 1969
Sire Gala Crest (AUS) 1962	Gala Performance (IRE); 1950	Stardust*	Hyperion*
Sire Gala Crest (AUS) 1962	Gala Performance (IRE); 1950	Stardust*	Sister Stella*
Sire Gala Crest (AUS) 1962	Gala Performance (IRE); 1950	Extravagance	Bahram*
Sire Gala Crest (AUS) 1962	Gala Performance (IRE); 1950	Extravagance	Spend A Penny
Sire Gala Crest (AUS) 1962	By The Sea (IRE); 1953	Summertime	Precipitation*
Sire Gala Crest (AUS) 1962	By The Sea (IRE); 1953	Summertime	Great Truth*
Sire Gala Crest (AUS) 1962	By The Sea (IRE); 1953	Lady Revel	Revelation
Sire Gala Crest (AUS) 1962	By The Sea (IRE); 1953	Lady Revel	Min Lu
Dam Smoke Fairy (AUS) 1961	Tailsman (GB); 1955	Supreme Court	Precipitation*
Dam Smoke Fairy (AUS) 1961	Tailsman (GB); 1955	Supreme Court	Forecourt
Dam Smoke Fairy (AUS) 1961	Tailsman (GB); 1955	Samovar	Caerleon
Dam Smoke Fairy (AUS) 1961	Tailsman (GB); 1955	Samovar	Carolina
Dam Smoke Fairy (AUS) 1961	Smoke Dream (AUS); 1955	Smokey Eyes	Stardust*
Dam Smoke Fairy (AUS) 1961	Smoke Dream (AUS); 1955	Smokey Eyes	Celestial Light
Dam Smoke Fairy (AUS) 1961	Smoke Dream (AUS); 1955	Dream Rocks	Golden Sovereign
Dam Smoke Fairy (AUS) 1961	Smoke Dream (AUS); 1955	Dream Rocks	Glen Maggie

* Gala Supreme is inbred 3S x 4D to the stallion Stardust, meaning that he appears third generation on the sire side of his pedigree, and fourth generation on the dam side of his pedigree.

* Gala Supreme is inbred 4S x 4D to the stallion Precipitation, meaning that he appears fourth generation on the sire side of his pedigree, and fourth generation on the dam side of his pedigree.

* Gala Supreme is inbred 4S x 5S to the stallion Bahram, meaning that he appears fourth generation and fifth generation (via Great Truth) on the sire side of his pedigree.
