= Paulele =

Australian thoroughbred racehorse

- Racing Silks of Godolphin
- Sire: Dawn Approach
- Grandsire: New Approach
- Dam: Chatoyant
- Damsire: Flying Spur
- Sex: Colt
- Foaled: 7 October 2018
- Country: Australia
- Colour: Chestnut
- Breeder: Godolphin
- Owner: Godolphin
- Trainer: James Cummings
- Record: 24: 8-4-2
- Earnings: A$2,424,300

Major wins
- Kindergarten Stakes (2021); Roman Consul Stakes (2021); Eskimo Prince Stakes (2022); Schillaci Stakes (2022); Winterbottom Stakes (2022)

Paulele (foaled 7 October 2018) is a Group 1 winning Australian Thoroughbred racehorse.

== Background ==
Paulele is a homebred of Godolphin by stallion Dawn Approach, who shuttled to Australia as a stallion between 2014 and 2018.

Paulele is one of seven winners bred from her dam, Chatoyant. This makes Paulele a three-quarter brother to the 2013 Thoroughbred Breeders Stakes winner, Montsegur, and a half-brother to the 2016 Canonbury Stakes winner Tessera.

== Racing career ==
As a two-year-old, Paulele raced on five occasions for three victories, culminating in his first stakes win in the 2021 Kindergarten Stakes at Randwick when ridden by Damien Oliver. Oliver commented on the horse after the race stating, "He is a bit of a weapon this horse”.

At the age of three, Paulele was successful in the 2021 Roman Consul Stakes when ridden by James McDonald and the 2022 Eskimo Prince Stakes when ridden by Kerrin McEvoy. Paulele would finish his three-year-old career with three minor placings at Group 1 level when running third in the T J Smith Stakes behind Nature Strip and second placings in the Doomben 10,000 and Kingsford-Smith Cup.

As a four-year-old, Paulele won the 2022 Schillaci Stakes at Caulfield, before winning his first Group 1 in the Winterbottom Stakes, when he came from last on the turn in a field of sixteen, to win by a head margin.

== Stud career ==
Paulele became a first season sire at Darley Stud in 2023.

== Pedigree ==
Pedigree of Paulele (AUS) 2018
Sire Dawn Approach (IRE) 2010	New Approach (IRE); 2005	Galileo	Sadler's Wells
Sire Dawn Approach (IRE) 2010	New Approach (IRE); 2005	Galileo	Urban Sea
Sire Dawn Approach (IRE) 2010	New Approach (IRE); 2005	Park Express	Ahonoora
Sire Dawn Approach (IRE) 2010	New Approach (IRE); 2005	Park Express	Matcher
Sire Dawn Approach (IRE) 2010	Hymn Of The Dawn (USA); 1999	Phone Trick	Clever Trick
Sire Dawn Approach (IRE) 2010	Hymn Of The Dawn (USA); 1999	Phone Trick	Over The Phone
Sire Dawn Approach (IRE) 2010	Hymn Of The Dawn (USA); 1999	Colonial Debut	Pleasant Colony
Sire Dawn Approach (IRE) 2010	Hymn Of The Dawn (USA); 1999	Colonial Debut	Kittihawk Miss
Dam Chatoyant (AUS) 2002	Flying Spur (AUS); 1992	Danehill	Danzig
Dam Chatoyant (AUS) 2002	Flying Spur (AUS); 1992	Danehill	Razyana
Dam Chatoyant (AUS) 2002	Flying Spur (AUS); 1992	Rolls	Mr. Prospector
Dam Chatoyant (AUS) 2002	Flying Spur (AUS); 1992	Rolls	Grand Luxe
Dam Chatoyant (AUS) 2002	Decidity (AUS); 1993	Last Tycoon	Try My Best
Dam Chatoyant (AUS) 2002	Decidity (AUS); 1993	Last Tycoon	Mill Princess
Dam Chatoyant (AUS) 2002	Decidity (AUS); 1993	Classy	Twig Moss
Dam Chatoyant (AUS) 2002	Decidity (AUS); 1993	Classy	Pirouette
