= Toorak Handicap =

Horse race held in Melbourne, Victoria, Australia

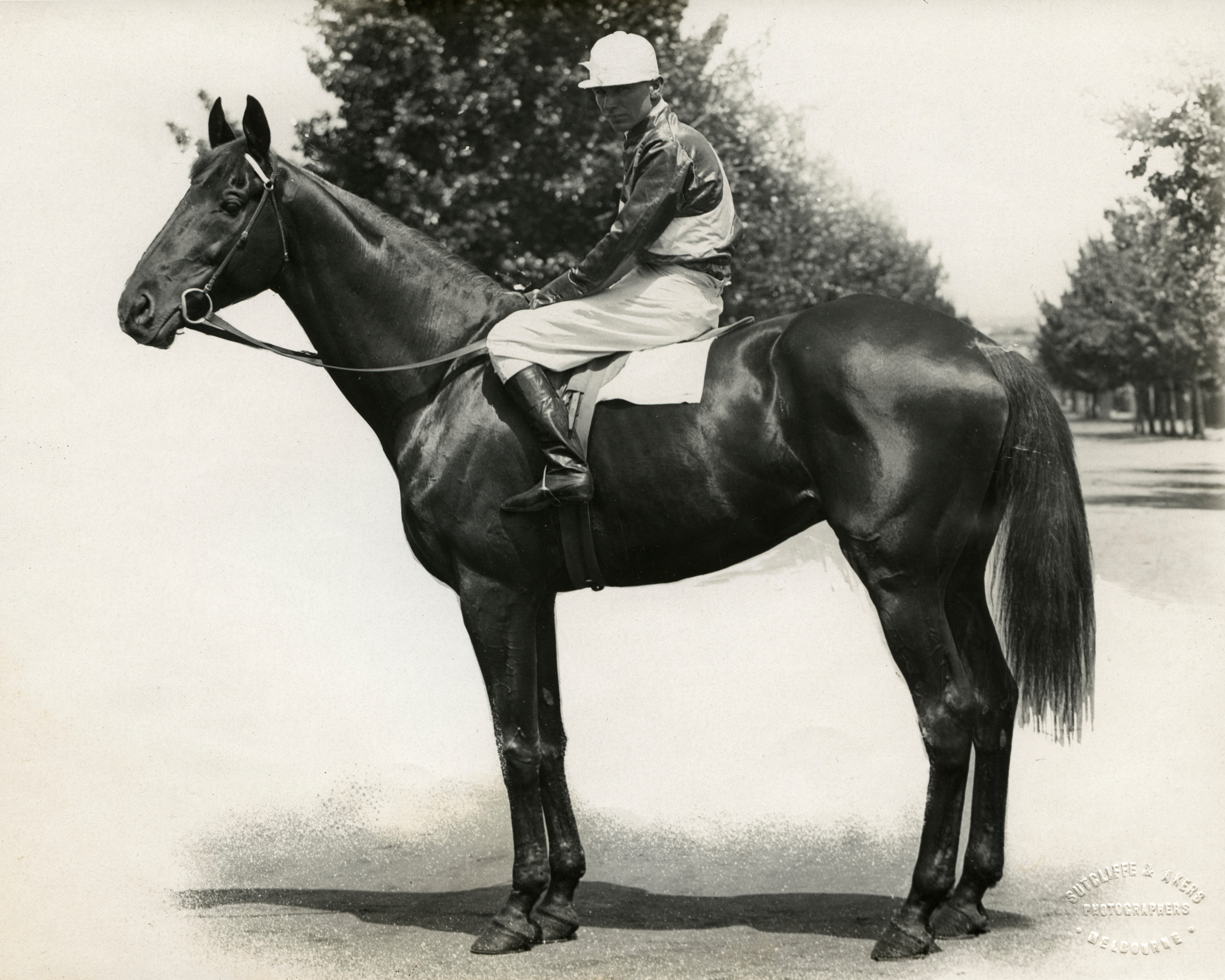
- Uncle Sam, 1912 winner
- Class: Group 1
- Location: Caulfield Racecourse, Melbourne, Australia
- Inaugurated: 1881
- Race type: Thoroughbred
- Sponsor: Hyland Race Colours (2025 & 2026)

Race information
- Distance: 1,600 metres
- Surface: Turf
- Track: Left-handed
- Qualification: Maidens ineligible
- Weight: Handicap
- Purse: $1,000,000 (2026)
- Bonuses: Winner exempt from ballot in the Caulfield Cup

The Toorak Handicap is a Melbourne Racing Club Group 1 Thoroughbred horse race run as an open handicap race, over a distance of 1,600 metres at Caulfield Racecourse, Melbourne, Victoria, Australia.

== History ==
The race is held annually in October on Caulfield Guineas day, the first day of the MRC Spring Carnival.

During World War II the race was run at Flemington Racecourse.

The G1 1400 metre Sir Rupert Clarke Stakes, held three weeks earlier under the same handicap conditions at Caulfield is considered the predominant lead up race. Thoroughbreds which perform well usually follow up by entering the G1 Cantala Stakes on Victoria Derby day. Some of the classier thoroughbreds do extend in distance and are successful.

=== Name ===
- 1886–1980 - Toorak Handicap
- 1981–1984 - The IXL
- 1985–1989 - The Elders Mile
- 1990 onwards - Toorak Handicap

=== Distance ===
- 1886–1890 - 1 mile (~1600 metres)
- 1891 - 1 1/8 miles (~1800 metres)
- 1892–1971 - 1 mile (~1600 metres)
- 1972 onwards - 1600 metres

=== Grade ===
- 1886–1978 - Principal Race
- 1979 onwards - Group 1

=== Double winners ===
Thoroughbreds that have won the Toorak Handicap – Caulfield Cup double:

- The Trump (1937), Royal Gem (1946), Galilee (1966), Tobin Bronze (1967), Leilani (1974).

=== 1922 and 1948 racebooks ===
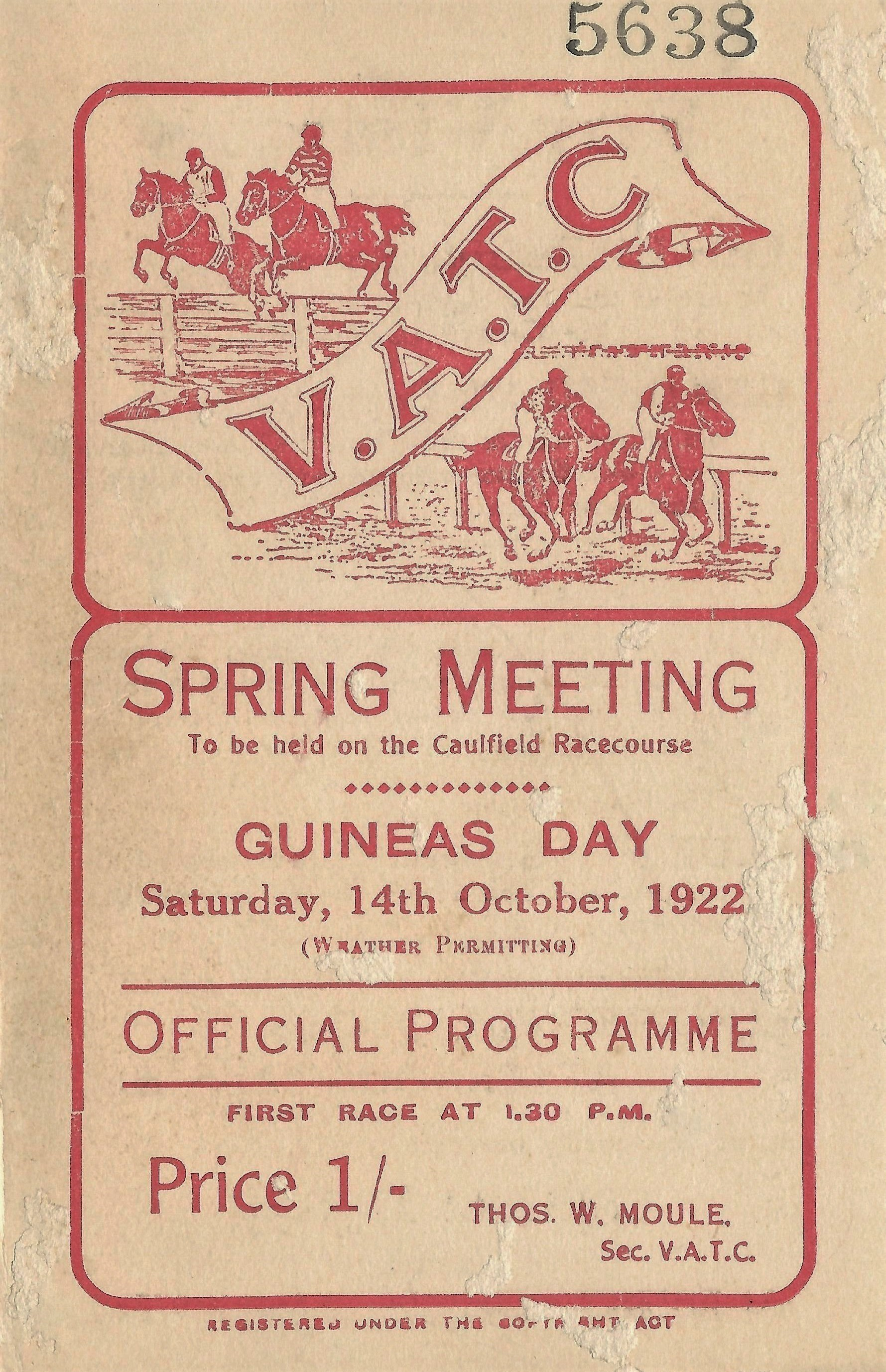
1922 VATC Caulfield Guineas front cover

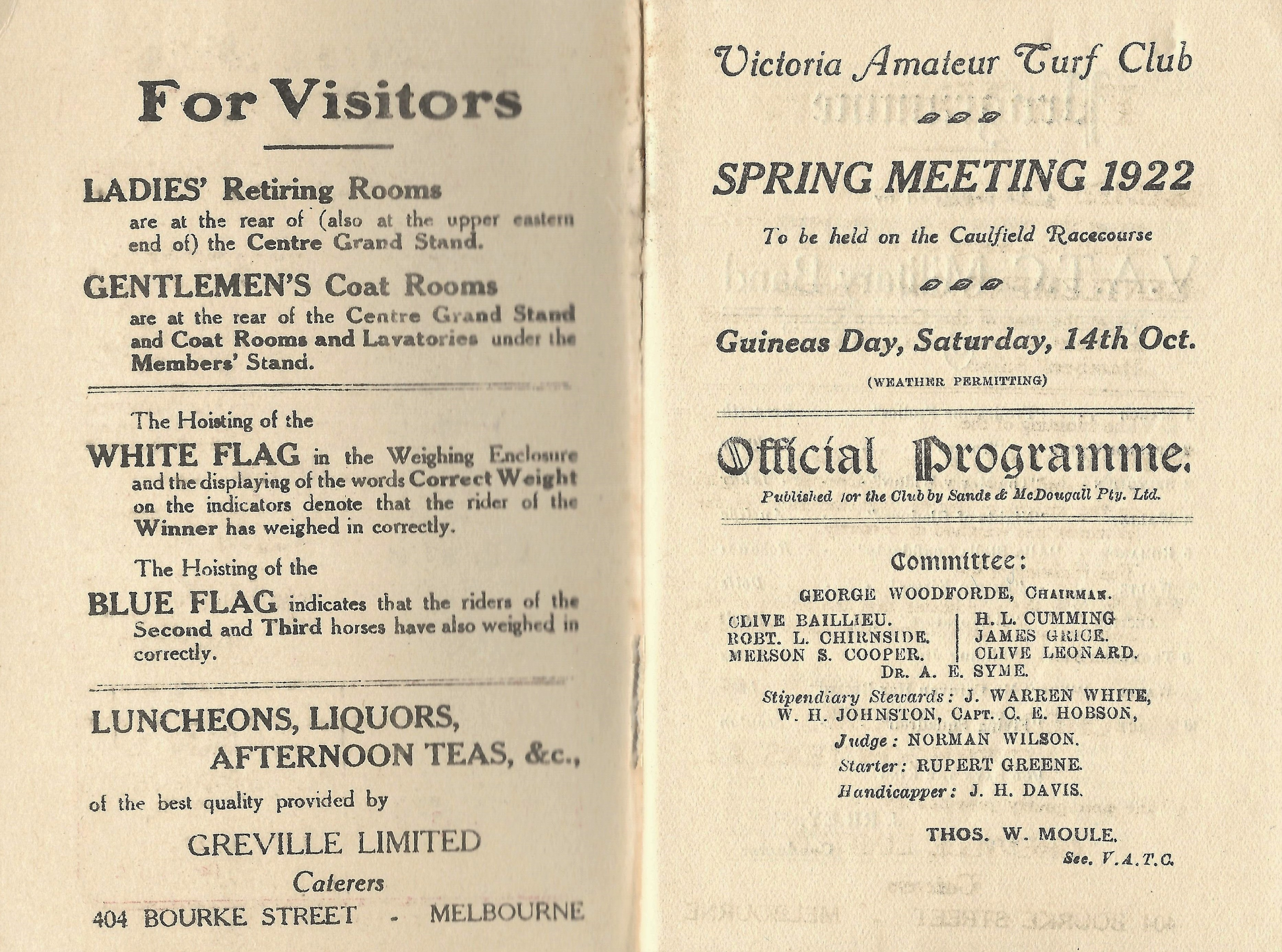
1922 VATC Caulfield Guineas officials & visitor notices

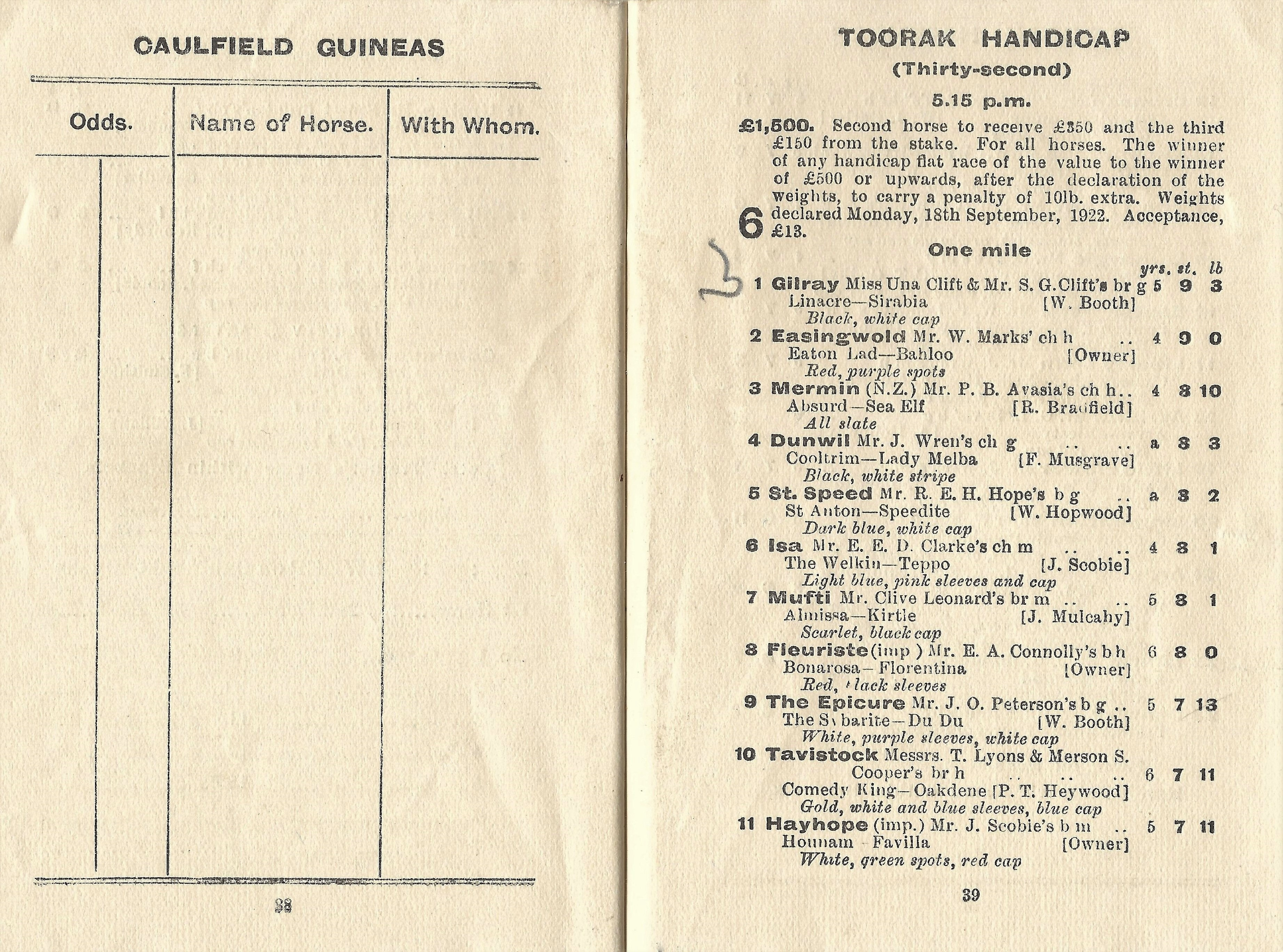
1922 VATC Toorak Handicap page starters and results

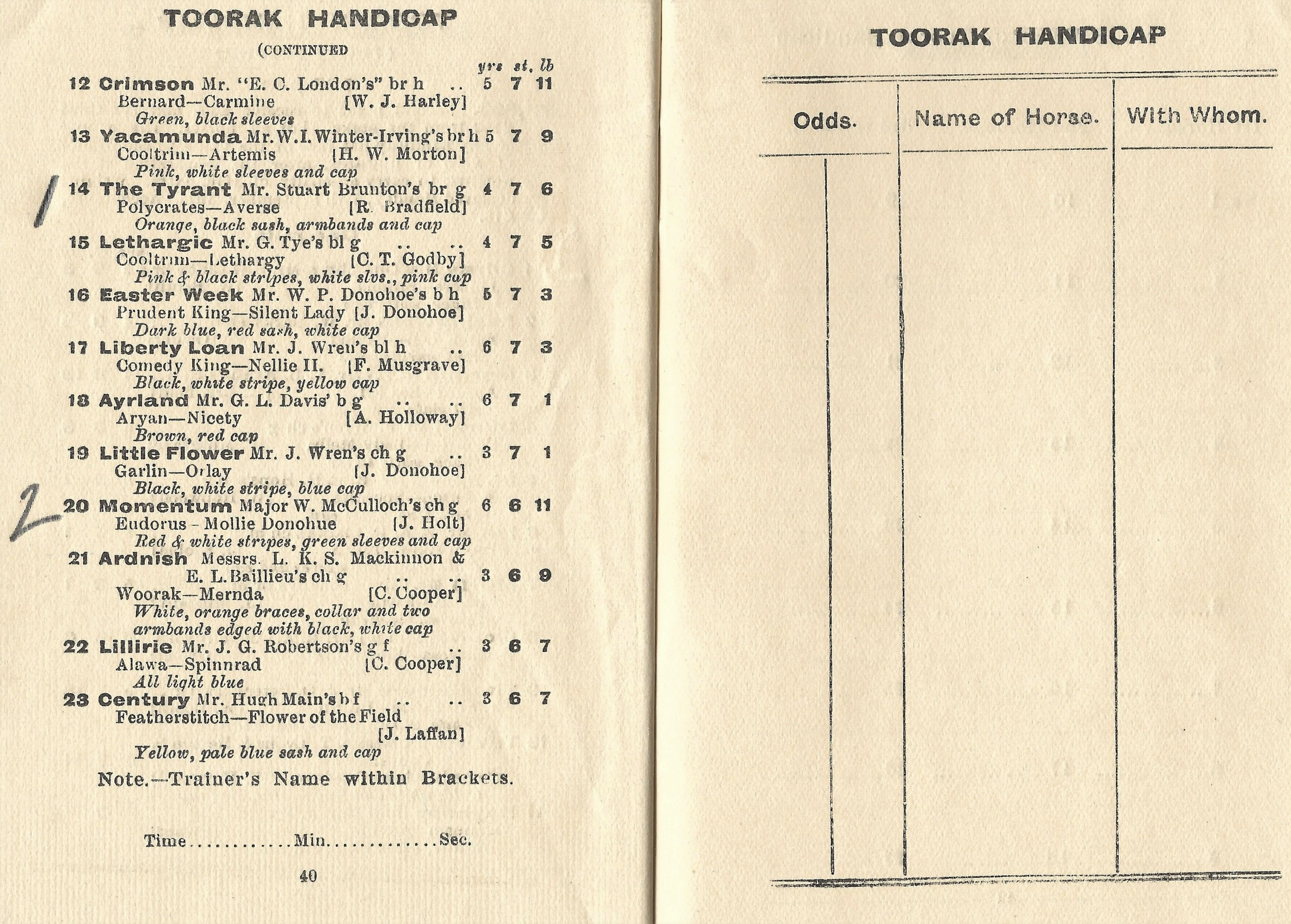
1922 VATC Toorak Handicap page showing the winner, The Tyrant

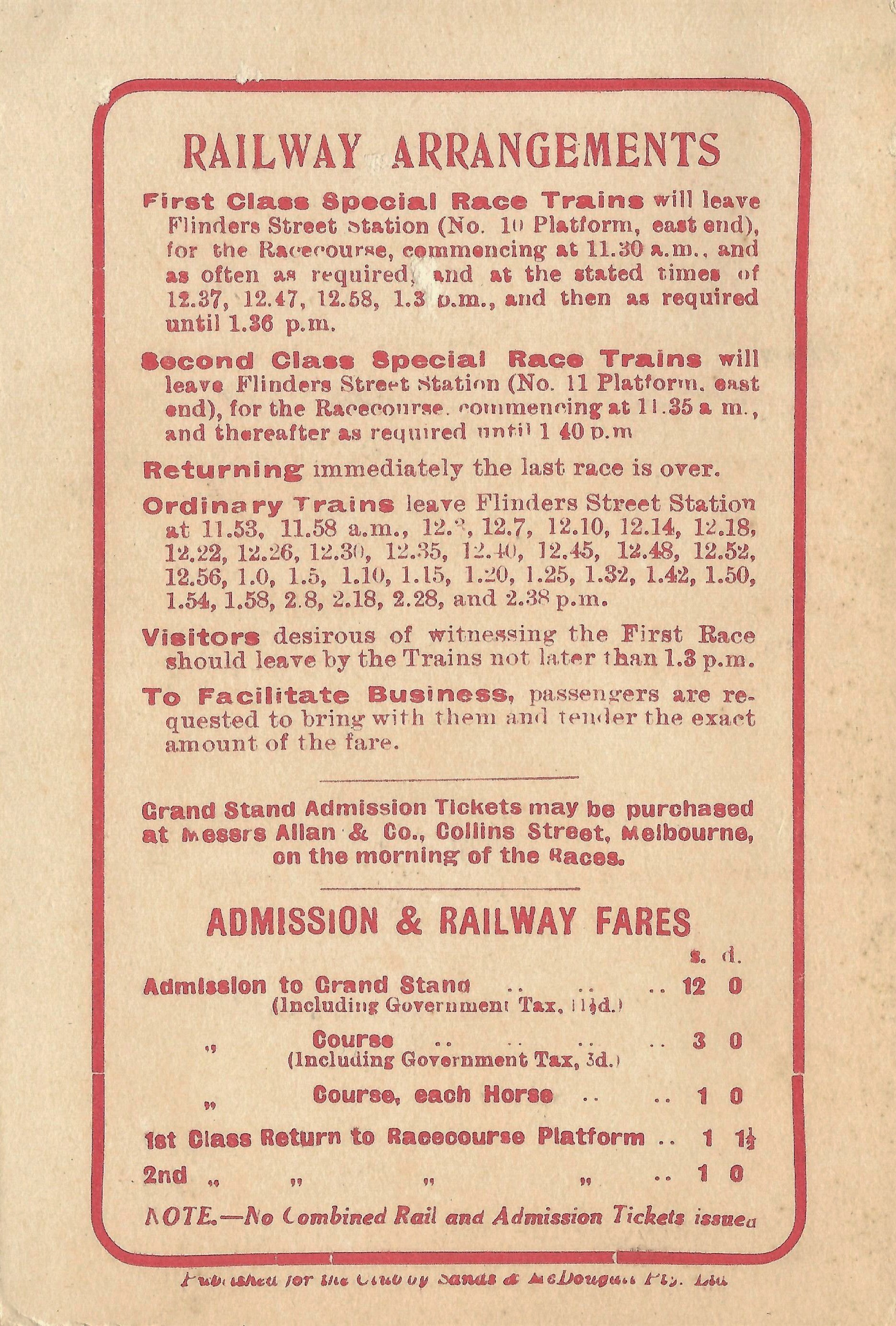
Back cover showing railway arrangements and admission fares

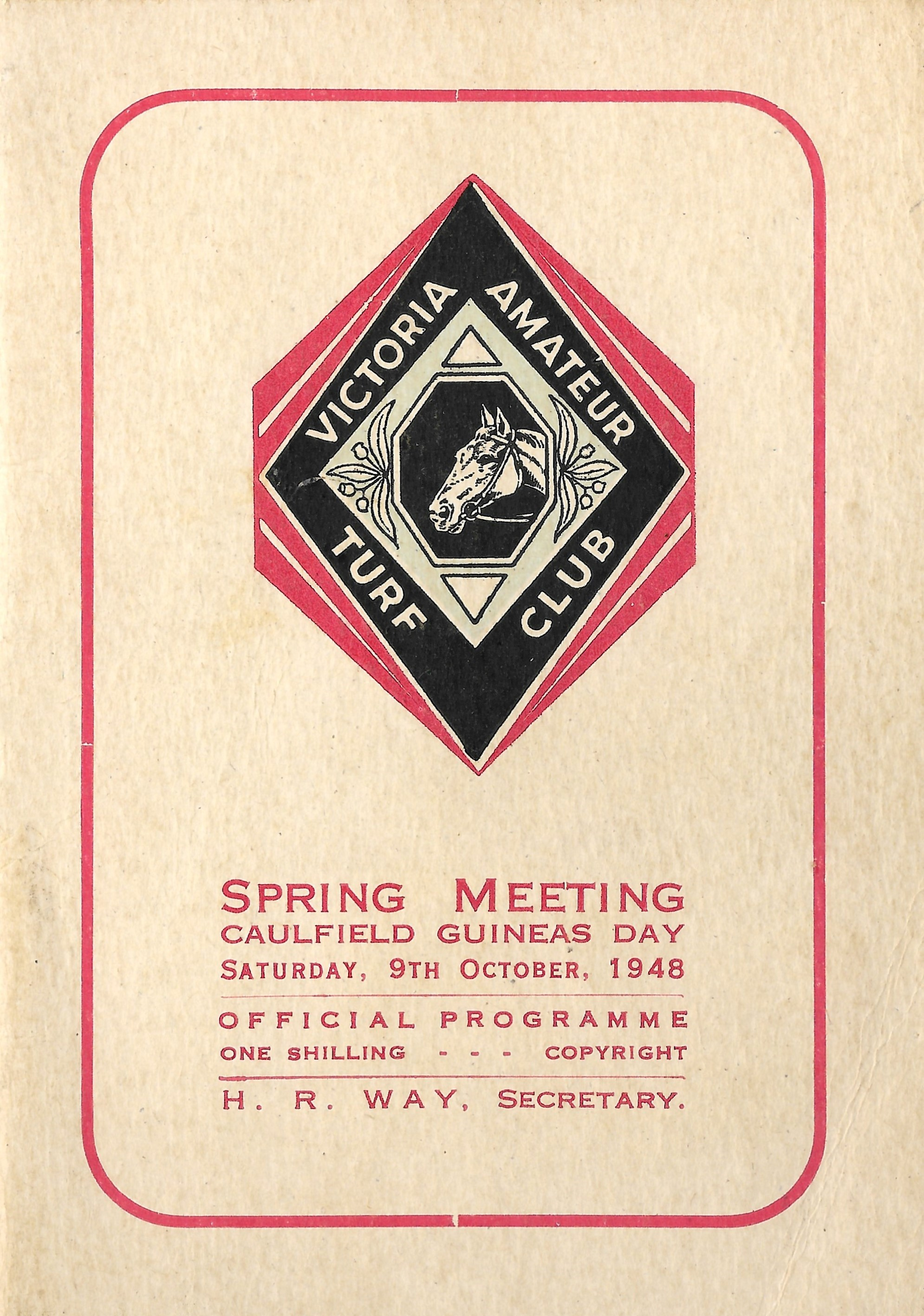
1948 VATC Caulfield Guineas racebook front cover

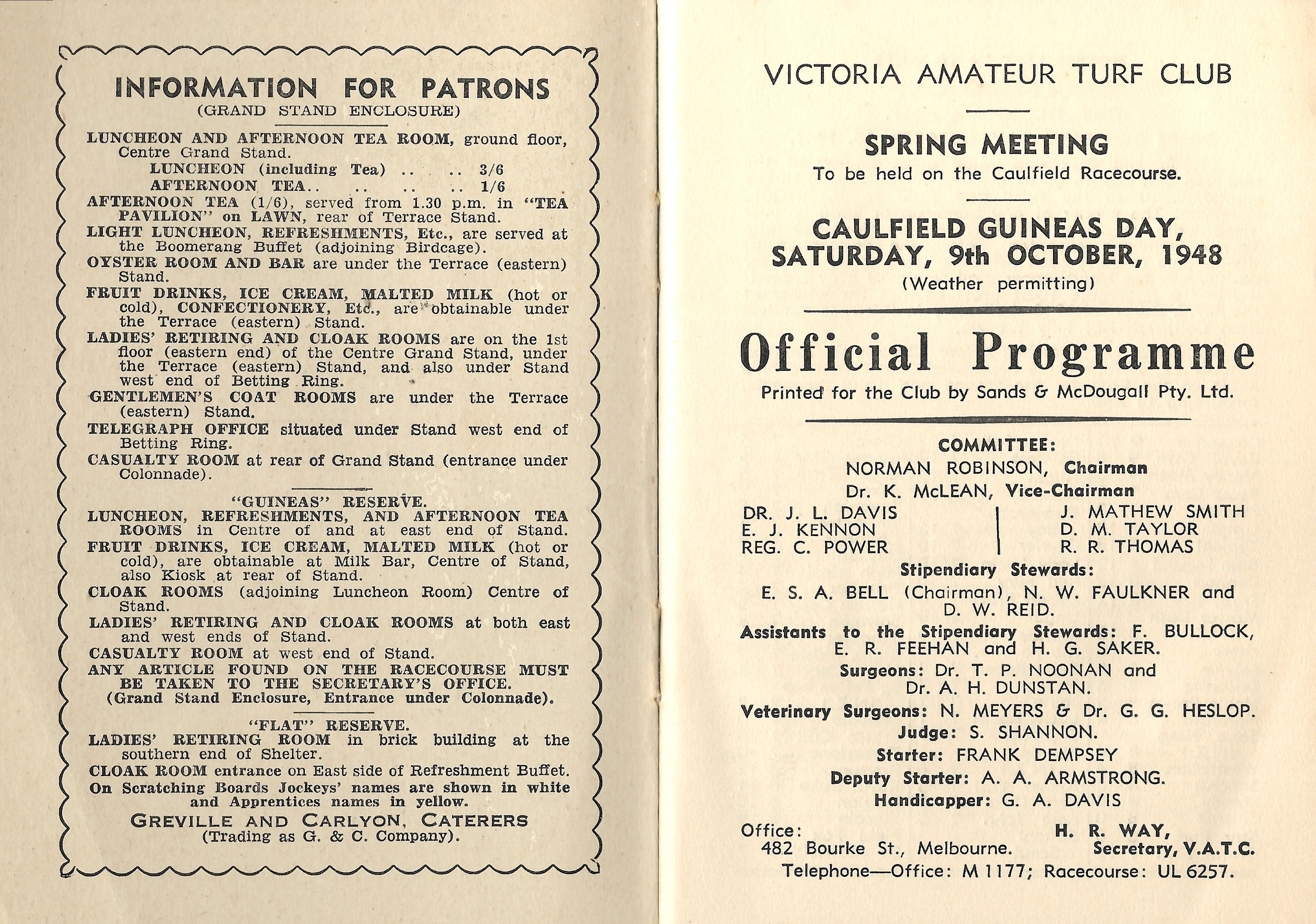
1948 VATC Caulfield Guineas officials & enclosure notices

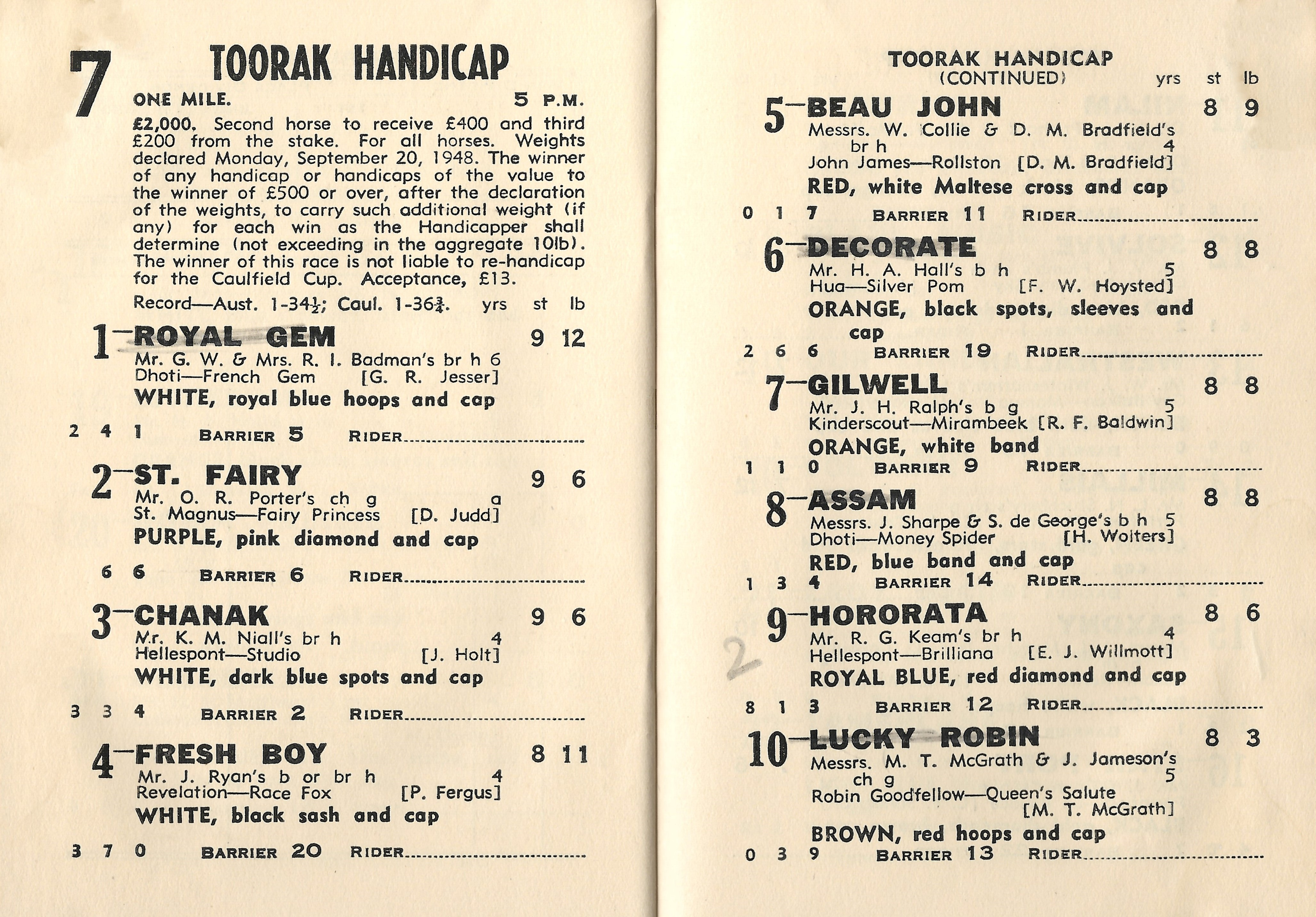
1948 VATC Toorak Handicap page starters and results

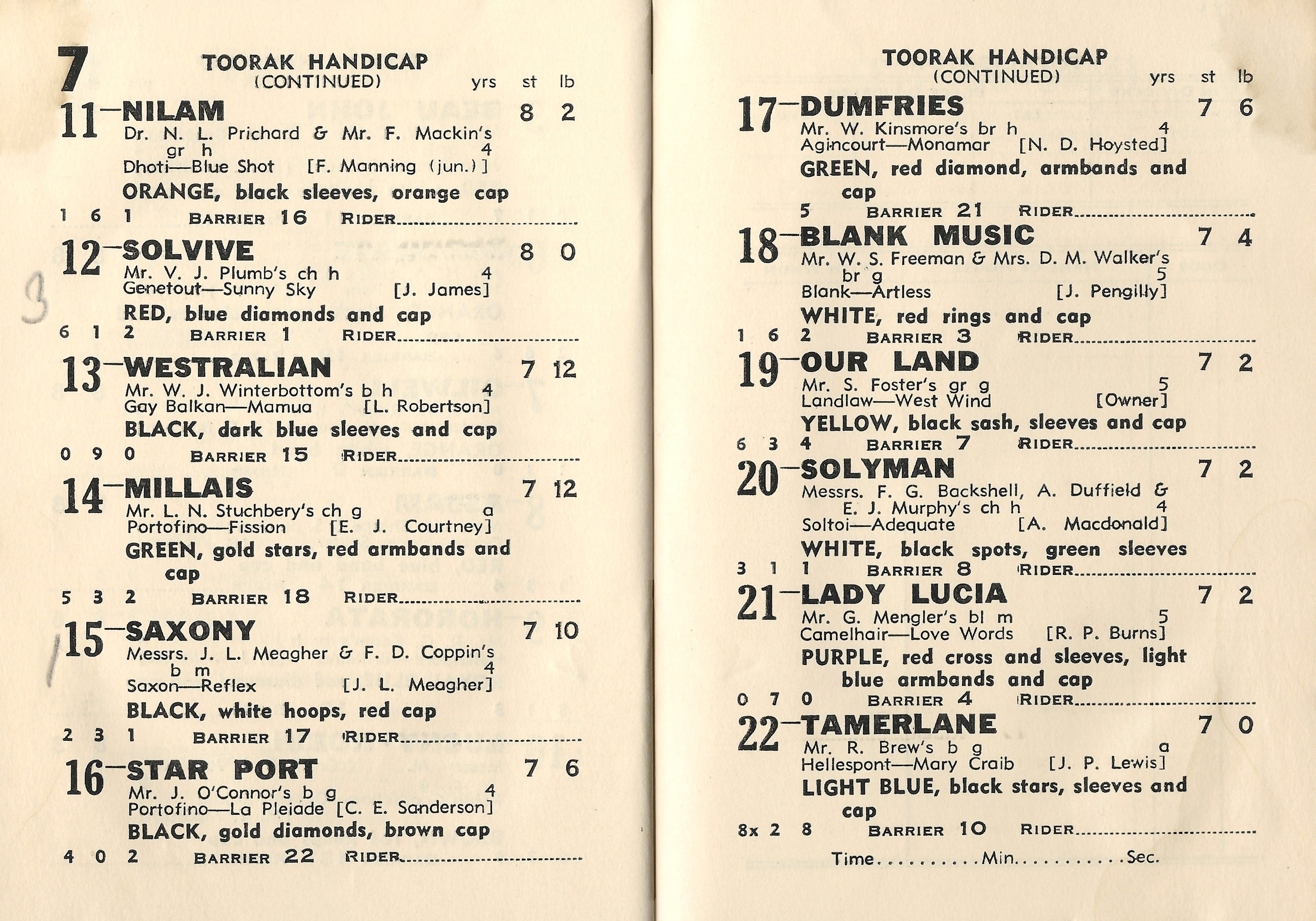
1948 VATC Toorak Handicap page showing the winner, Saxony

== Winners ==
The following are past winners of the Toorak Handicap.

- 2026 - Lady Shenandoah
- 2025 - Transatlantic
- 2024 - Antino
- 2023 - Attrition
- 2022 - Tuvalu
- 2021 - I'm Thunderstruck
- 2020 - Mr Quickie
- 2019 - Fierce Impact
- 2018 - Land Of Plenty
- 2017 - Tosen Stardom
- 2016 – He's Our Rokkii
- 2015 – Lucky Hussler
- 2014 – Trust In A Gust
- 2013 – Solzhenitsyn
- 2012 – Solzhenitsyn
- 2011 – King Mufhasa
- 2010 – More Joyous
- 2009 – Allez Wonder
- 2008 – Alamosa
- 2007 – Divine Madonna
- 2006 – Red Dazzler
- 2005 – Barely A Moment
- 2004 – Regal Roller
- 2003 – Roman Arch
- 2002 – Shot Of Thunder
- 2001 – Show A Heart
- 2000 – Umrum
- 1999 – Umrum
- 1998 – Marble Halls
- 1997 – Penghulu
- 1996 – Poetic King
- 1995 – Sober Suit
- 1994 – Oppressor
- 1993 – Golden Sword
- 1992 – Ready To Explode
- 1991 – Comrade
- 1990 – Ricochet Rosie
- 1989 – Cole Diesel
- 1988 – Planet Ruler
- 1987 – Caledonian Boy
- 1986 – Canny Lass
- 1985 – King Phoenix
- 1984 – Mr. Ironclad
- 1983 – Showmeran
- 1982 – Magari
- 1981 – Penny Edition
- 1980 – Torbek
- 1979 – Manaroa
- 1978 – Salamander
- 1977 – Nunkalowe
- 1976 – Visit
- 1975 – Plush
- 1974 – Leilani
- 1973 – Princess Eulogy
- 1972 – All Shot
- 1971 – Gunsynd
- 1970 – Tauto
- 1969 – Crewman
- 1968 – Tried And True
- 1967 – Tobin Bronze
- 1966 – Galilee
- 1965 – Ripa
- 1964 – Nicopolis
- 1963 – Nicopolis
- 1962 – Gay Filou
- 1961 – Anonyme
- 1960 – Gabonia
- 1959 – Smokey Jane
- 1958 – Tudor Hill
- 1957 – Mac's Amber
- 1956 – Farquhar
- 1955 – Harmonist
- 1954 – Plato
- 1953 – Desert Breeze
- 1952 – Desert Breeze
- 1951 – Jovial Lad
- 1950 – Grey Boots
- 1949 – Saxony
- 1948 – Saxony
- 1947 – Don Pedro
- 1946 – Royal Gem
- 1945 – Huntingdale
- 1944 – The Bohemian
- 1943 – ‡ Burberry / Counsel
- 1942 – Crojick
- 1941 – Sun Valley
- 1940 – Gold Salute
- 1939 – Hilton
- 1938 – † El Golea / Ena
- 1937 – The Trump
- 1936 – The Chanter
- 1935 – † Epigram / Journal
- 1934 – Sir Simper
- 1933 – Chilperic
- 1932 – K. Cid
- 1931 – Glenanton
- 1930 – The Gay Mutineer
- 1929 – Highland
- 1928 – Kalloni
- 1927 – Textile
- 1926 – Abdera
- 1925 – Metellus
- 1924 – Soorak
- 1923 – Sonora
- 1922 – The Tyrant
- 1921 – Stare
- 1920 – Lord Setay
- 1919 – St. Mira
- 1918 – Prince Royal
- 1917 – King's Bounty
- 1916 – Rael Locin
- 1915 – Miss Meadows
- 1914 – Rathlea
- 1913 – Valido
- 1912 – Uncle Sam
- 1911 – Motoa
- 1910 – Sequarious
- 1909 – Irishman
- 1908 – Soultline
- 1907 – True Scot
- 1906 – Iolaire
- 1905 – Dandalla
- 1904 – Ossian
- 1903 – F.J.A.
- 1902 – Kinglock
- 1901 – Bonnie Chiel
- 1900 – Lochaber
- 1899 – Alva
- 1898 – Massinissa
- 1897 – Paul Pry
- 1896 – Hopscotch
- 1895 – Mostyn
- 1894 – Devon
- 1893 – Titan
- 1892 – Fortunatus
- 1891 – Zalinski
- 1890 – Precedence
- 1889 – Maelstrom
- 1888 – Bothwell
- 1887 – Dufferin
- 1886 – Middlemarch
- 1885 – Mentmore
- 1884 – Precious Stone
- 1883 – Bar One
- 1882 – Verdure
- 1881 – Josephine

† Dead heat
‡ Run in divisions

== See also ==
- Caulfield Guineas
- Caulfield Stakes
- Ladies Day Vase
- Herbert Power Stakes
- Northwood Plume Stakes
- Schillaci Stakes
- List of Australian Group races
- Group races
