= Northwood Plume Stakes =

- Class: Group 3
- Location: Caulfield Racecourse, Melbourne, Australia
- Inaugurated: 2005 (Listed)
- Race type: Thoroughbred
- Sponsor: HKJC World Pool (2025 & 2026)

Race information
- Distance: 1,200 metres
- Surface: Turf
- Qualification: Mares, four years old and older that are not maidens
- Weight: Set weights with penalties
- Purse: $240,000 (2026)

The Northwood Plume Stakes is a registered Melbourne Racing Club Group 3 Thoroughbred horse race for mares four years old and older, run at set weights with penalties, over a distance of 1200 metres at Caulfield Racecourse, Melbourne, Australia in October.

== History ==
The registered race is named after Northwood Plume, who won the 1994 The Thousand Guineas–VRC Oaks double and was named Champion three-year-old filly that season. The race is held on the first day of the MRC Spring Carnival.

Since 2010, if the winner of the event has previously won one of the two heats (W W Cockram Stakes or How Now Stakes), then the connections will win a $50,000 bonus from William Hill.

=== Name ===
- 2005 - Thai Airways International Classic
- 2006 - Northwood Plume Stakes
- 2007–2008 - Le Tan Stakes
- 2009 - Northwood Plume Stakes
- 2010–2014 - Sportingbet Sprint Series Final
- 2015–2018 - Cape Grim Beef Steaks
- 2019 - Bass Strait Beef Steaks
- 2020 - Northwood Plume Stakes

=== Venue ===
- 2005 onwards - Caulfield Racecourse

=== Grade ===
- 2006–2012 - Listed race
- 2013 onwards - Group 3

== Winners ==
The following are past winners of the race.

- 2026 - Point Barrow
- 2025 - She's Bulletproof
- 2024 - Aviatress
- 2023 - She Dances
- 2022 - Literary Magnate
- 2021 - Dirty Thoughts
- 2020 - Fiesta
- 2019 - Tofane
- 2018 - Winter Bride
- 2017 - Cool Passion
- 2016 - Sheidel
- 2015 - Politeness
- 2014 - Griante
- 2013 - Aerobatics
- 2012 - Serena Star
- 2011 - Hinemoa
- 2010 - Avenue
- 2009 - Our Lona
- 2008 - Belong To Many
- 2007 - Storm Signal
- 2006 - Personal Ensign
- 2005 - Crimson Reign

== See also ==
- Caulfield Guineas
- Herbert Power Stakes
- Ladies Day Vase
- Schillaci Stakes
- The Might and Power (Caulfield Stakes)
- Toorak Handicap
- List of Australian Group races
- Group races
