= Master O'Reilly =

New Zealand-bred Thoroughbred racehorse

- Sire: O'Reilly (NZ)
- Grandsire: Last Tycoon (Ire)
- Dam: Without Remorse (NZ)
- Damsire: Bakharoff (US)
- Sex: Gelding
- Foaled: 2 December 2002
- Country: New Zealand
- Colour: Brown
- Owner: Bill Sutcliffe & Judy Mawer
- Trainer: 1. Danny O'Brien; 2. Judy Mawer
- Record: 26:8-3-4
- Earnings: A$2,985,400

Major wins
- Winning Edge Presentations Stakes (2007); Caulfield Cup (2007)
- Last updated on 3 July 2007

Master O'Reilly (2002–2013) was a New Zealand bred race horse trained by Judy Mawer. He was the 2007 winner of the Caulfield Cup when ridden by Vlad Duric.

In October 2007, Master O'Reilly was penalized 1.5 kg by Racing Victoria Limited prior to the Melbourne Cup, one of the highest penalties given in recent years. Although the penalty placed him 26th among a field of 24 horses, he was nevertheless guaranteed a start and went on to win the Caulfield Cup later that week. He was well supported in the Melbourne Cup, starting favourite, but he finished a disappointing eighth behind Efficient. Despite not winning since that Caulfield Cup, he continued to run in good form, including:

- 2nd in the Group 1 Turnbull Stakes at Flemington.
- 3rd in the Group 2 Sandown Classic.
- 4th in the 2008 and 2009 Melbourne Cups.

Master O'Reilly retired from racing in 2011 at Pearcedale (near Cranbourne in Victoria). He was found dead near a road in March 2013, aged 10.
