= Eskimo Prince Stakes =

- Class: Group 3
- Location: Randwick, Rosehill, Warwick Farm Racecourse, Canterbury Park Racecourse
- Inaugurated: 1984
- Race type: Thoroughbred - flat
- Sponsor: Kia Ora (2026)

Race information
- Distance: 1,200 metres
- Surface: Turf
- Track: Right-handed
- Qualification: Three year old
- Weight: Set weights with penalties
- Purse: A$250,000 (2026)

The Eskimo Prince Stakes is an Australian Turf Club Group 3 Thoroughbred horse race, for three-year-olds, with set weights with penalties conditions, over a distance of 1200 metres that has been raced at Randwick, Rosehill, Canterbury Park Racecourse and Warwick Farm Racecourse in Sydney, Australia in February.

== History ==
The race is named after Eskimo Prince, who was the champion two-year-old in 1964, winning the Golden Slipper Stakes and continuing later in the year won the Canterbury Stakes and Rosehill Guineas.The horse was sold and stood at stud in the US and died in 1979 in Oklahoma.
The race was part of the Canterbury Stakes Carnival and was raced at night.
From 2008–2010 the race was sponsored by the Widden Stud. The race was renamed to the Strada Stakes in honour of the winner of this race in 2006 who also stood as a sire at Widden Stud.

=== Name ===
- 1984–2000 - Eskimo Prince Quality Handicap
- 2001–2002 - Eskimo Prince Stakes
- 2003–2005 - 3com Stakes
- 2006–2007 - Eskimo Prince Stakes
- 2008–2010 - Strada Stakes
- 2011 onwards - Eskimo Prince Stakes

=== Distance ===
- 1984–1986 - 1280 metres
- 1987–1990 - 1200 metres
- 1991–2007 - 1100 metres
- 2008 onwards - 1200 metres

=== Grade ===
- 1986–2014 - Listed Race
- 2015 onwards - Group 3

=== Venue ===
- 1984–1996 - Canterbury Park Racecourse
- 1997–1999 - Rosehill Gardens Racecourse
- 2000–2005 - Canterbury Park Racecourse
- 2006–2010 - Randwick Racecourse
- 2011 - Warwick Farm Racecourse
- 2012 - Randwick Racecourse
- 2013 - Warwick Farm Racecourse
- 2014–2015 - Rosehill Gardens Racecourse
- 2016–2017 - Randwick Racecourse
- 2018–2020 - Warwick Farm Racecourse
- 2021 onwards – Randwick Racecourse

=== Records ===
In 2003 Dehero broke the course record for 1100 metres at Canterbury with a time of 1:03.05 which stood for eleven years and was broken in 2014.

== Winners ==
The following are past winners of the race.

- 2026 - Tempted
- 2025 - Public Attention
- 2024 - Caballus
- 2023 - Aft Cabin
- 2022 - Paulele
- 2021 - Peltzer
- 2020 - abandoned
- 2019 - Gem Song
- 2018 - Kementari
- 2017 - Man From Uncle
- 2016 - Spill The Beans
- 2015 - Scissor Kick
- 2014 - El Roca
- 2013 - Ichihara
- 2012 - Nobby Snip
- 2011 - Agister
- 2010 - The Mikado
- 2009 - Bhutane Dane
- 2008 - Tenant's Tiara
- 2007 - Absolutelyfabulous
- 2006 - Strada
- 2005 - Snippetson
- 2004 - Spark Of Life
- 2003 - Dehero
- 2002 - Red Hannigan
- 2001 - National Saint
- 2000 - Major
- 1999 - Troon
- 1998 - Noble Challenge
- 1997 - Investigation
- 1996 - Quick Flick
- 1995 - Magic Winner
- 1994 - Sympose
- 1993 - Our Replica
- 1992 - Yallah Lad
- 1991 - Varikos
- 1990 - Sir Laurence
- 1989 - Ideal Score
- 1988 - Royal Handout
- 1987 - Cupillus
- 1986 - All In A Name
- 1985 - Pago's Yarn
- 1984 - Run Ashore

== See also ==
- List of Australian Group races
- Group races
