= Schillaci Stakes =

- Class: Group 2
- Location: Caulfield Racecourse, Melbourne, Australia
- Inaugurated: 1970
- Race type: Thoroughbred
- Sponsor: Henley Homes (2024 - 2026)

Race information
- Distance: 1,100 metres
- Surface: Turf
- Track: Left-handed
- Qualification: Three years old and older that are not maidens
- Weight: Weight for age
- Purse: A$300,000 (2026)

The Schillaci Stakes is a Melbourne Racing Club Group 2 Thoroughbred horse race held under weight for age conditions, for horses aged three years old and older, over a distance of 1,100 metres at Caulfield Racecourse, Melbourne, Australia in October.

== History ==
=== Name ===
Previously known as the Chirnside Stakes it was renamed in 2000 in honour of the former champion sprinter Schillaci.

- 1970–1999 - Chirnside Stakes
- 2000 onwards - Schillaci Stakes

=== Distance ===
- 1970–1972 - 6 furlongs (~1200 metres)
- 1973–1985 – 1200 metres
- 1986 – 1219 metres
- 1987 – 1200 metres
- 1988–2014 – 1000 metres
- 2015 – 1100 metres

=== Grade ===
- 1970–1978 - Principal Race
- 1979 onwards - Group 2

== Winners ==
the following are past winners of the Schillaci Stakes.

- 2026 - Jigsaw
- 2025 - Giga Kick
- 2024 - Bellatrix Star
- 2023 - Asfoora
- 2022 - Paulele
- 2021 - Savatoxl
- 2020 - Dirty Work
- 2019 - Trekking
- 2018 - Ball Of Muscle
- 2017 - Super Cash
- 2016 - Star Turn
- 2015 - Alpha Miss
- 2014 - Rubick
- 2013 - Unpretentious
- 2012 - Buffering
- 2011 - Black Caviar
- 2010 - Black Caviar
- 2009 - Lucky Secret
- 2008 - Wilander
- 2007 - Gold Edition
- 2006 - Miss Andretti
- 2005 - Segments
- 2004 - Patpong
- 2003 - Halibery
- 2002 - Spinning Hill
- 2001 - Mistegic
- 2000 - Falvelon
- 1999 - Magic Music
- 1998 - Show No Emotion
- 1997 - Mahogany
- 1996 - †Sequalo / Sword
- 1995 - Moss Rocket
- 1994 - Bint Marscay
- 1993 - Green Sweeper
- 1992 - King Marauding
- 1991 - Street Ruffian
- 1990 - Street Ruffian
- 1989 - Scarlet Bisque
- 1988 - Rancho Ruler
- 1987 - Ever Ready
- 1986 - Belle Spirit
- 1985 - Lake Worth
- 1984 - Mighty Avenger
- 1983 - Qubeau
- 1982 - Galleon
- 1981 - Opera Prince
- 1980 - Countess Marizza
- 1979 - Mr.Magic
- 1978 - The Judge
- 1977 - Desirable
- 1976 - Bold Mayo
- 1975 - Tontonan
- 1974 - Grey Way
- 1973 - Prize Lad
- 1972 - Tolerance
- 1971 - Proud Toff
- 1970 - Regal Vista

† Dead heat

== See also ==
- Caulfield Guineas
- Herbert Power Stakes
- Ladies Day Vase
- Northwood Plume Stakes
- The Might and Power (Caulfield Stakes)
- Toorak Handicap
- List of Australian Group races
- Group races
