= Ladies' Night =

Ladies' Night may refer to:

- Ladies' night, a type of promotional event
  - Ladies' Night (baseball), a 20th-century fixture in Major League Baseball

== Film and television ==
- Ladies' Night (film), a 2003 Mexican romantic comedy
- Ladies Night, a 1983 film starring Stella Stevens
- "Ladies' Night" (The Cleveland Show), an episode of The Cleveland Show
- "Ladies' Night" (Degrassi: The Next Generation), an episode of Degrassi: The Next Generation
- Ladies Night, a 2019 reality television series on BET

== Music ==
- Ladies' Night (album), a 1979 album by Kool & the Gang
  - "Ladies' Night" (song), the title song
- Ladies Night (Atomic Kitten album), 2003
- Ladies Night (Preston Reed album), 2004
- "Ladies Night", a 2006 song by Ayumi Hamasaki from (Miss)understood
- "Ladies Night", a 2006 song by Nina Sky from La Conexión
- "Ladies Night", a 2019 song by Red Velvet from The ReVe Festival: Day 2
- "Not Tonight" (song), remixed as "Ladies' Night", a 1997 song by Lil' Kim

== Other media ==
- Ladies' Night (novel), a 2000 novel by Jack Ketchum
- Ladies' Night (play), a 1920 Broadway play by Charlton Andrews and Avery Hopwood
- Ladies Night (play), a 1987 New Zealand play by Stephen Sinclair and Anthony McCarten
