= Ladies Day Vase =

Ladies' Day Vase
- Class: Group 3
- Location: Caulfield Racecourse, Melbourne, Australia
- Inaugurated: 1994 (as Charles Kerville Handicap)
- Race type: Thoroughbred
- Sponsor: Evergreen Turf (2026)

Race information
- Distance: 1,600 metres
- Surface: Turf
- Track: Left-handed
- Qualification: Mares four years old and older
- Weight: Set weights with penalties
- Purse: $240,000 (2026)

The Ladies' Day Vase is a registered Melbourne Racing Club Group 3 Thoroughbred horse race for mares four years old and older, run at set weights with penalties, over a distance of 1600 metres at Caulfield Racecourse, Melbourne, Australia in October.

== History ==
The race has been run on the second day of the MRC Spring Carnival which is on a Wednesday in mid October.

=== Grade ===
- Prior to 2006 - Handicap
- 2006–2012 - Listed race
- 2013 onwards - Group 3

=== Name ===
- 1994–1997 - Charles Kerville Handicap
- 1998 - Melbourne's 1377 3MP Plate
- 1999 - Liz Davenport Classic
- 2000–2001 - Charles Kerville Handicap
- 2002 - Jack Dolby Plate
- 2003 - Indulgence Marquee Handicap
- 2004 - Glasshouse Cafe at Caulfield Tabaret Handicap
- 2005 - Classic Caulfield Ladies' Day Vase
- 2006 - Perri Cutten Classic
- 2007–2010 - carsales.com.au Classic
- 2011–2012 - Race-Tech Classic
- 2013 - Snowhite Maintenance Classic
- 2014–2022 - Ladies' Day Vase (prefaced by various sponsors names)
- 2023–2025 - Catanach's Jewellers Vase
- 2026 - Evergreen Turf Vase

== Winners ==
Past winners of the race.

- 2026 - Surfin' Bird
- 2025 - Oh Too Good
- 2024 - Grinzinger Belle
- 2023 - Wishlor Lass
- 2022 - Sirileo Miss
- 2021 - Sirileo Miss
- 2020 - Sovereign Award
- 2019 - Spanish Reef
- 2018 - I Am A Star
- 2017 - Quilate
- 2016 - Euro Angel
- 2015 - Miss Rose De Lago
- 2014 - Star Fashion
- 2013 - Zonza
- 2012 - Star Of Giselle
- 2011 - Hi Belle
- 2010 - Royal Commands
- 2009 - Lady Lynette
- 2008 - Miss Badoura
- 2007 - Post Thyme
- 2006 - Gawne
- 2005 - Matras
- 2004 - Loyal Lauren
- 2003 - Sweet Corn
- 2002 - Latte
- 2001 - Piper Star
- 2000 - Market Price
- 1999 - Our Erin
- 1998 - Touch of Fantasy
- 1997 - Cheval Place
- 1996 - Kalaring
- 1995 - Cyclone Watch
- 1994 - Cyclone Watch

== See also ==
- Caulfield Guineas
- Herbert Power Stakes
- Northwood Plume Stakes
- Schillaci Stakes
- The Might and Power (Caulfield Stakes)
- Toorak Handicap
- List of Australian Group races
- Group races
