= Sebastian Murphy =

Australian jockey

Sebastian Murphy (born 1990 in Ballarat, Victoria) is a Thoroughbred horse racing jockey.

He is the son of Champion Australian jockey Garry Murphy and worked for Ballarat trainer Darren Weir for whom he had 129 wins.

His first race-day ride was on Ballyrogan at Swan Hill on 1 August 2005 and he had his first win 22 days later at the same venue with Z'affaire. In the 2007 season he was the inaugural winner of the National Patient Transport Rising Stars Apprentice Series. Murphy rode in the 2007 Melbourne Cup aboard the Michael Moroney trained horse Sarrera and was placed 18th. Murphy is currently ranked fourth overall in Australia for 2008, and is the leading Australian Apprentice.

Murphy rode four winners at Sandown on May 6, 2007, and his first Group winner was on his 18th birthday when Publishing won the 2018 Standish Handicap at Flemington.

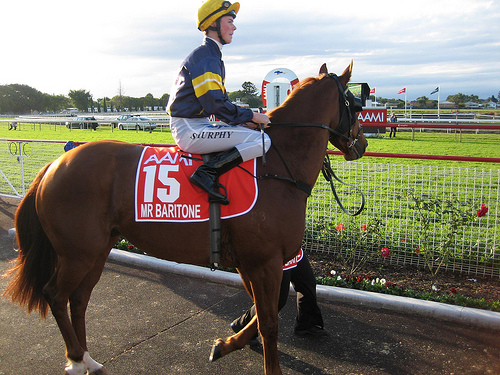
Mr Baritone - 2008 winner - Stradbroke Handicap

Sebastian Murphy won his first Group 1 race on Saturday 7 June 2008 when he rode the Mike Moroney trained Mr Baritone to victory in the Stradbroke Handicap at Eagle Farm.

Murphy's career as a jockey ended due to increasing weight with his last race-day rides on 27 March 2010 at Ballarat. He won 355 races including the Group 1 Stradbroke Handicap, three Group 3 and three listed races along with 610 places from 2838 starts. He then went on to study and has continued to work in the racing industry as a stable hand or trackwork rider for trainers such as Luca Cumani in Newmarket, England, Bart Cummings and Peter Moody.
