= Herbert Power Stakes =

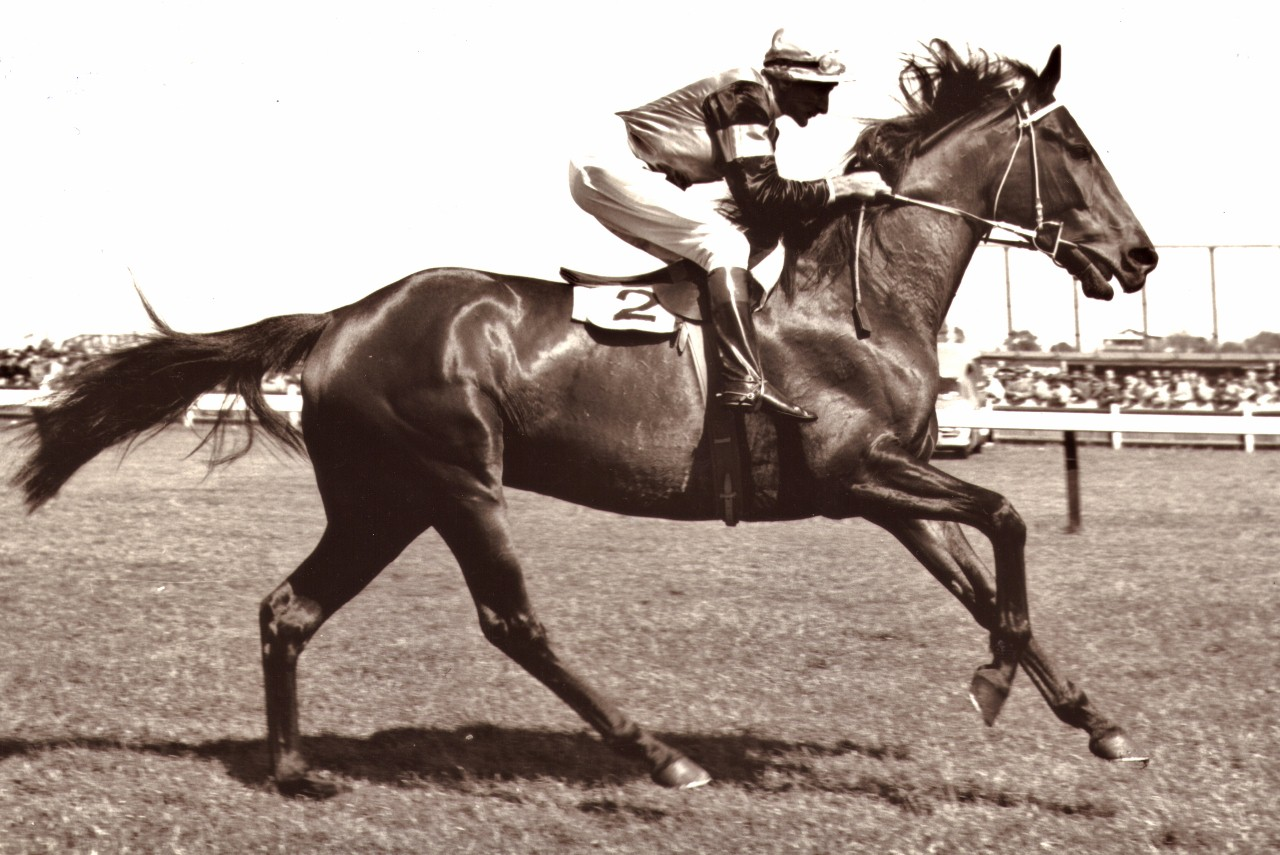
- 1955 winner – Rising Fast
- Class: Group 2
- Location: Caulfield Racecourse
- Inaugurated: 1898 (as Eclipse Stakes)
- Race type: Thoroughbred
- Sponsor: Sportsbet (2025 & 2026)

Race information
- Distance: 2,400 metres
- Surface: Turf
- Track: Left-handed
- Qualification: Three years old and older that are not maidens
- Weight: Quality handicap
- Purse: $400,000 (2026)
- Bonuses: Winner exempt from ballot in the Caulfield Cup

The Herbert Power Stakes is a Melbourne Racing Club Group 2 Thoroughbred horse race held under quality handicap conditions, for horses aged three years old and older, over a distance of 2400 metres. It is held at Caulfield Racecourse in Melbourne, Australia.

== History ==
The race was named after former Victoria Amateur Turf Club Chairman and thoroughbred owner Herbert Power (1833–1919), who was instrumental in the formation of the sport of racing in the early days of the Colony of Victoria. He joined the original Melbourne Club in 1859 and played an integral part in the merger in 1864 of the Victorian Turf Club and Victorian Jockey club to form today's Victoria Racing Club. In 1875, he was one of a band of racing enthusiasts who founded the Victoria Amateur Turf Club. He was a member of the VATC committee, and he was chairman in 1889, 1896 and 1907. When he retired from the committee he was appointed one of the trustees of the Caulfield racecourse. He was one of the auditors of the VRC from 1880 until 1905.

The race is considered an important lead-up to the Caulfield and Melbourne Cups.

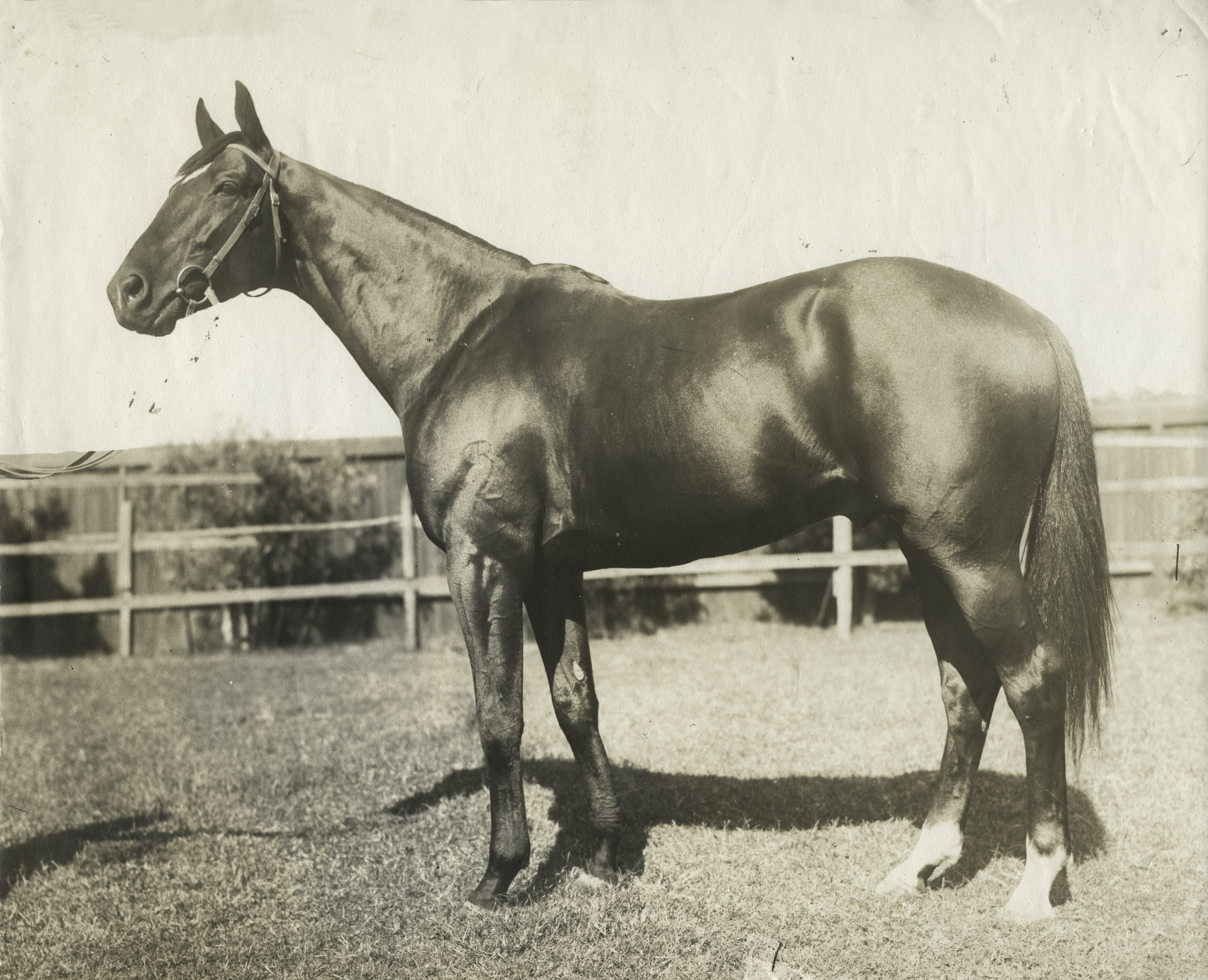
Poseidon, 1906 & 1907 winner

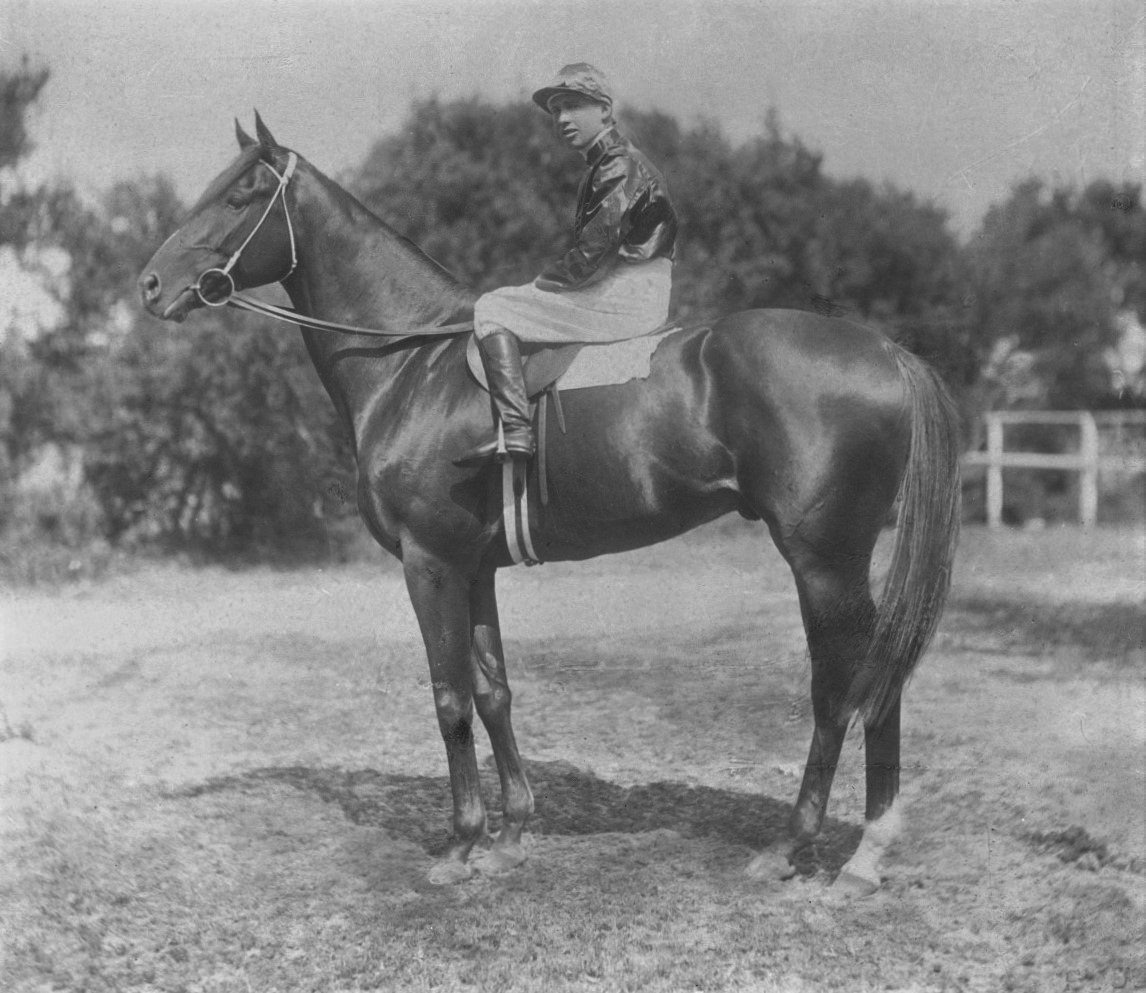
Eurythmic, 1921 winner

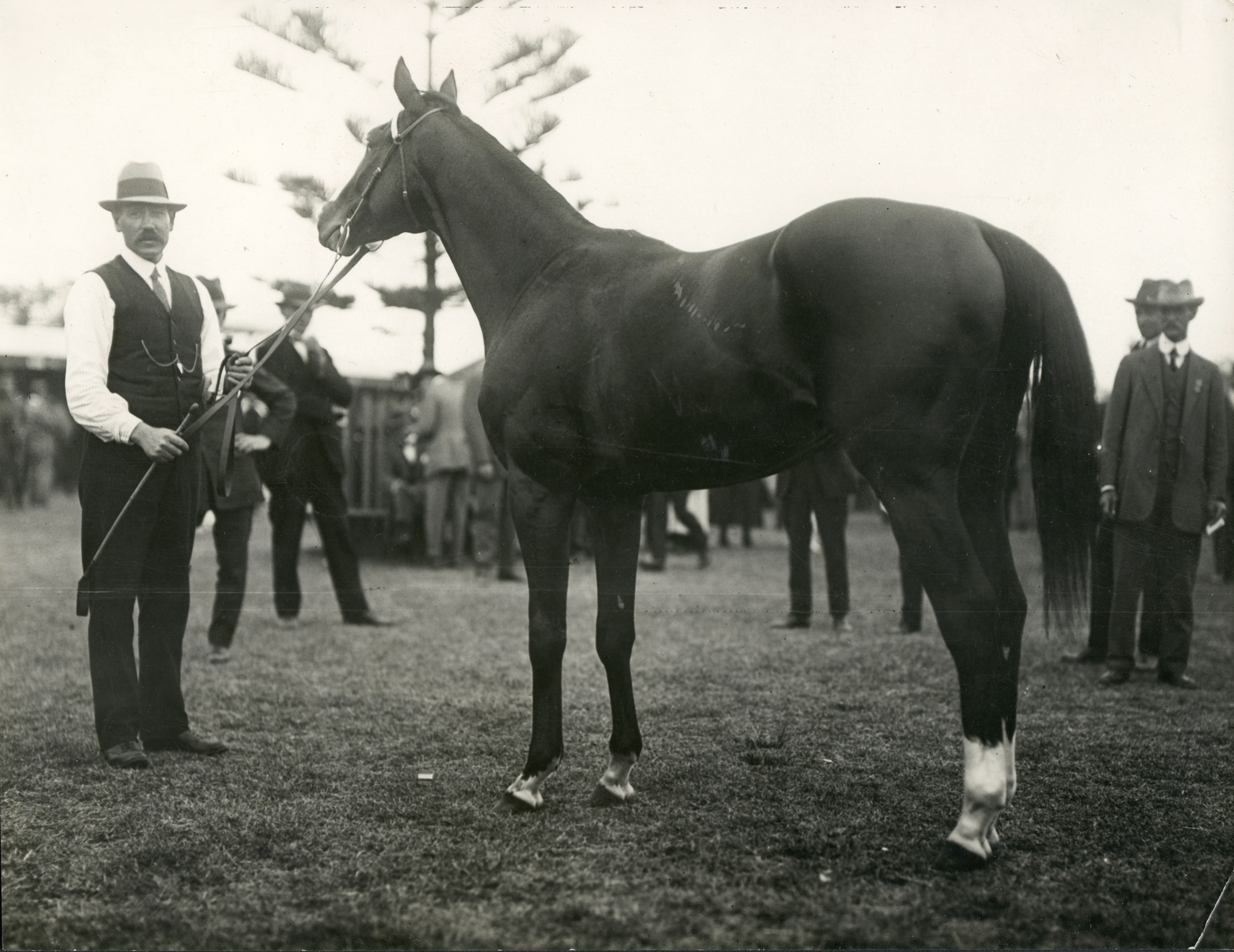
Outlook, 1918 winner

During World War II the race was run at Flemington Racecourse.

=== Name ===
- 1898–1919 - Eclipse Stakes
- 1920–1992 - Herbert Power Handicap
- 1993–1996 - Quick-Eze Stakes
- 1997 - Perrier Mineral Water Stakes
- 1998–1999 - Perrier Stakes
- 2000 - Herbert Power Stakes
- 2001–08 - Winning Edge Presentations Stakes
- 2009 onwards - Herbert Power Stakes

=== Distance ===
- 1898–1899 - 1 mile (~1600 metres)
- 1900–1919 - 1 3/8 miles (~2200 metres)
- 1920–1971 - 1 1/2 miles (~2400 metres)
- 1972 onwards - 2400 metres

=== Grade ===
- 1898–1978 - Principal Race
- 1979–1980 - Group 3
- 1981 onwards - Group 2

=== Doubles wins ===
The following thoroughbreds have won the Herbert Power Stakes – Melbourne Cup double in the same year.

- Rogan Josh (1999), Arwon (1978), Van der Hum (1976), Gala Supreme (1973), Sirius (1944) and Poseidon (1906)

The following thoroughbreds have won the Herbert Power Stakes – Caulfield Cup double in the same year.

- Master O'Reilly (2007), Beer Street (1970), Rising Fast (1955), My Hero (1953), Poseidon twice (1906 and 1907), Marvel Loch (1905)

=== 1948 racebook ===
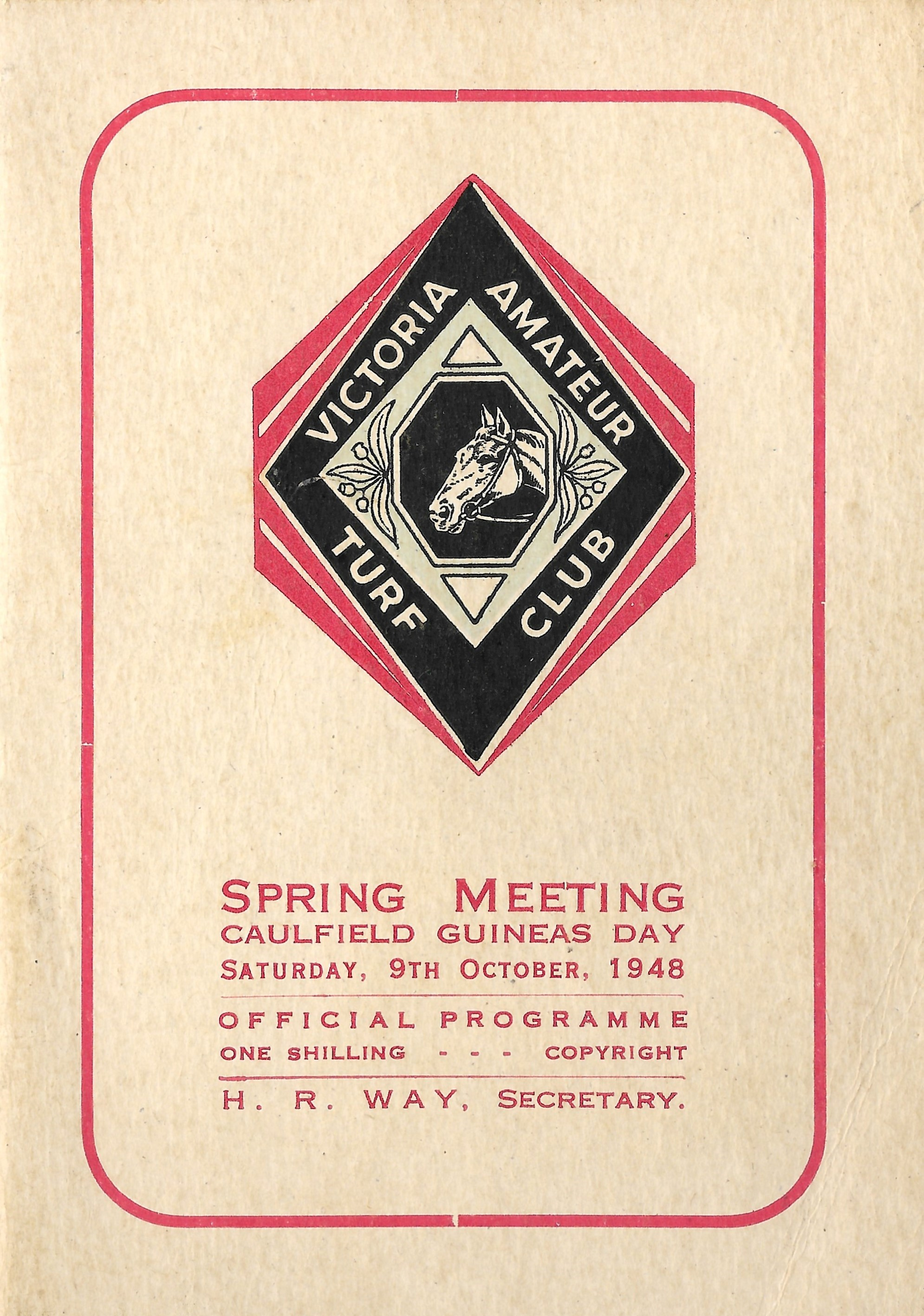
1948 VATC Caulfield Guineas racebook front cover

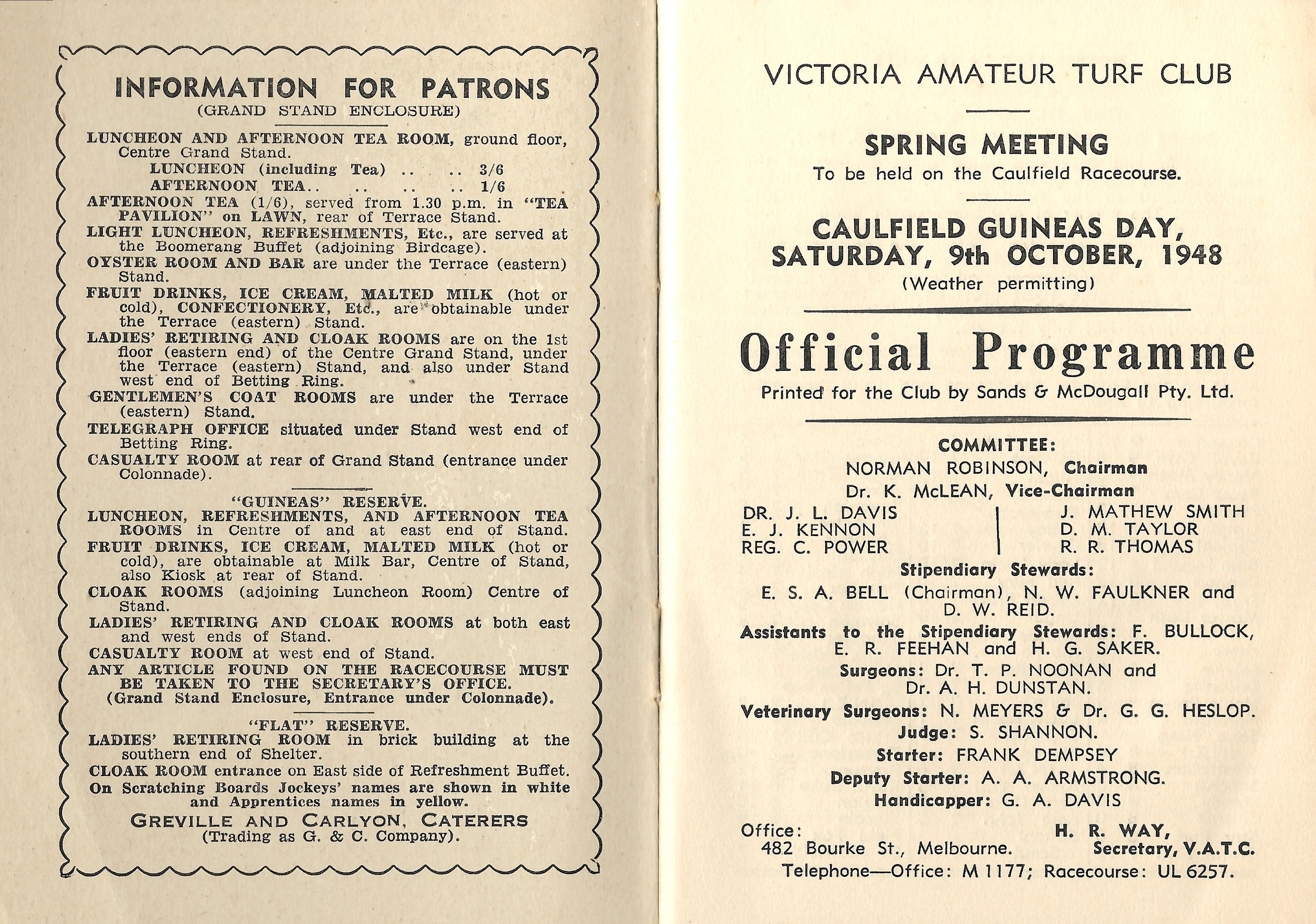
1948 VATC Caulfield Guineas officials & enclosure notices

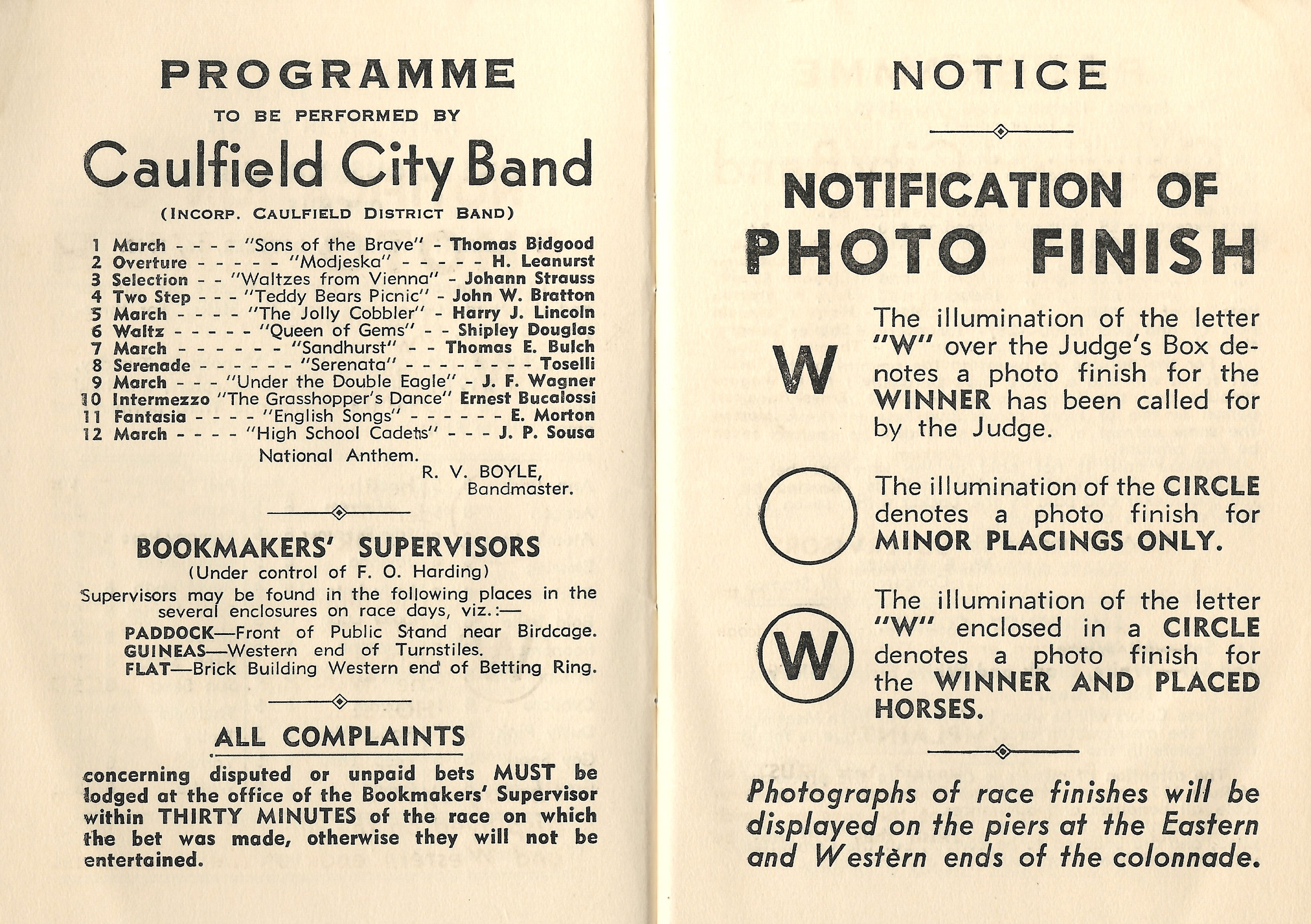
1948 VATC Caulfield Guineas raceday notices

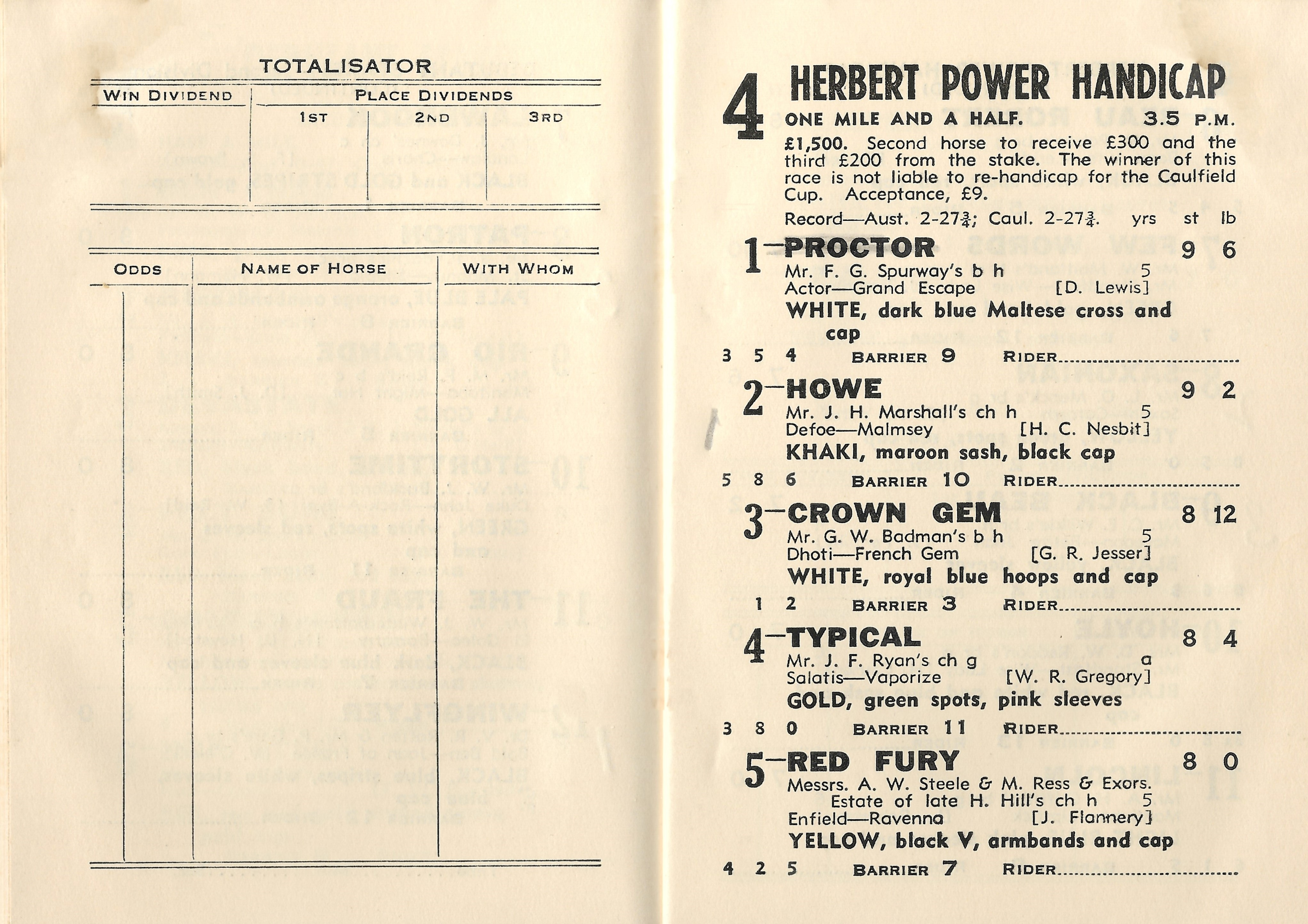
1948 VATC Herbert Power Handicap page showing the winner, Howe

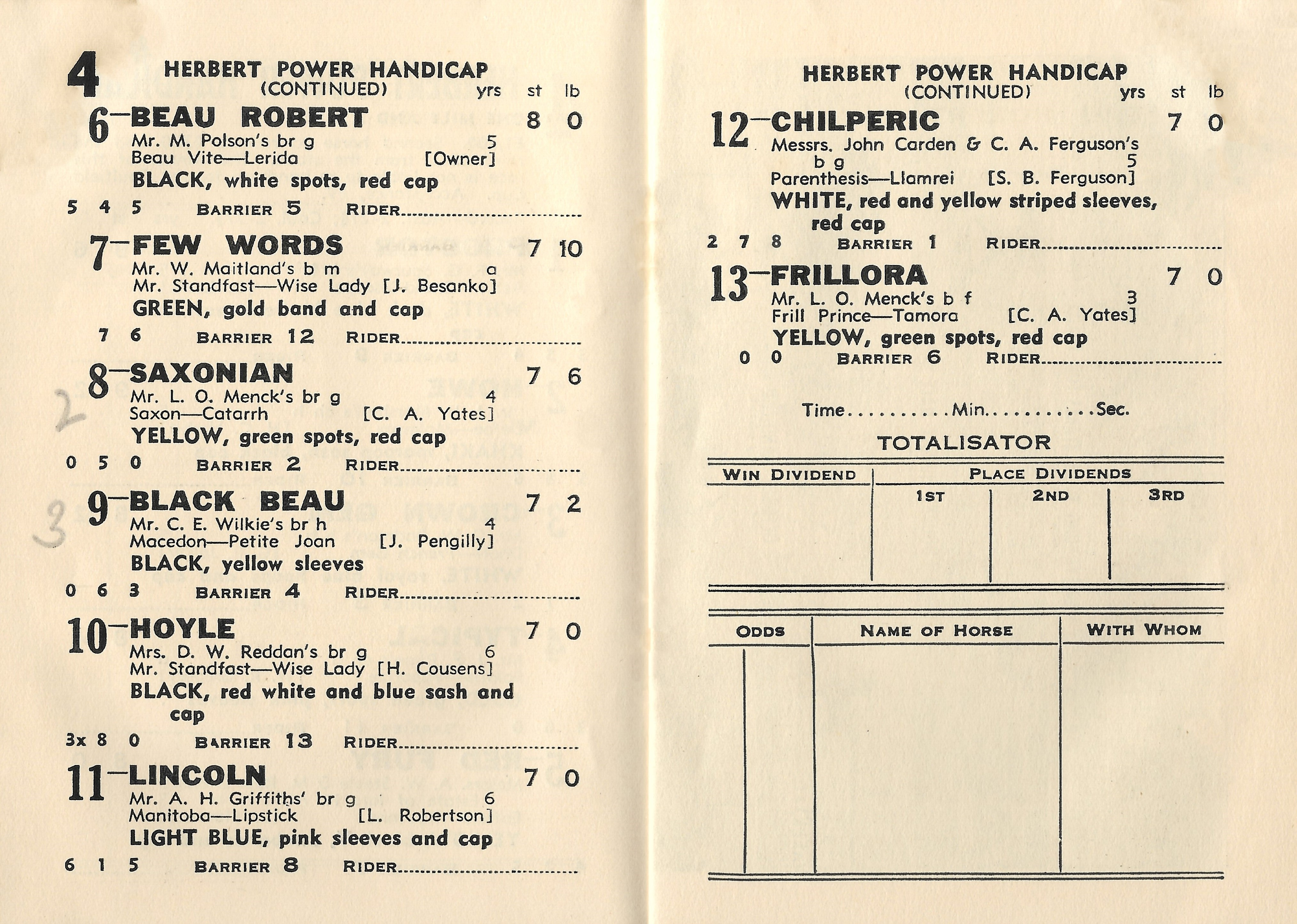
1948 VATC Herbert Power Handicap page starters and results

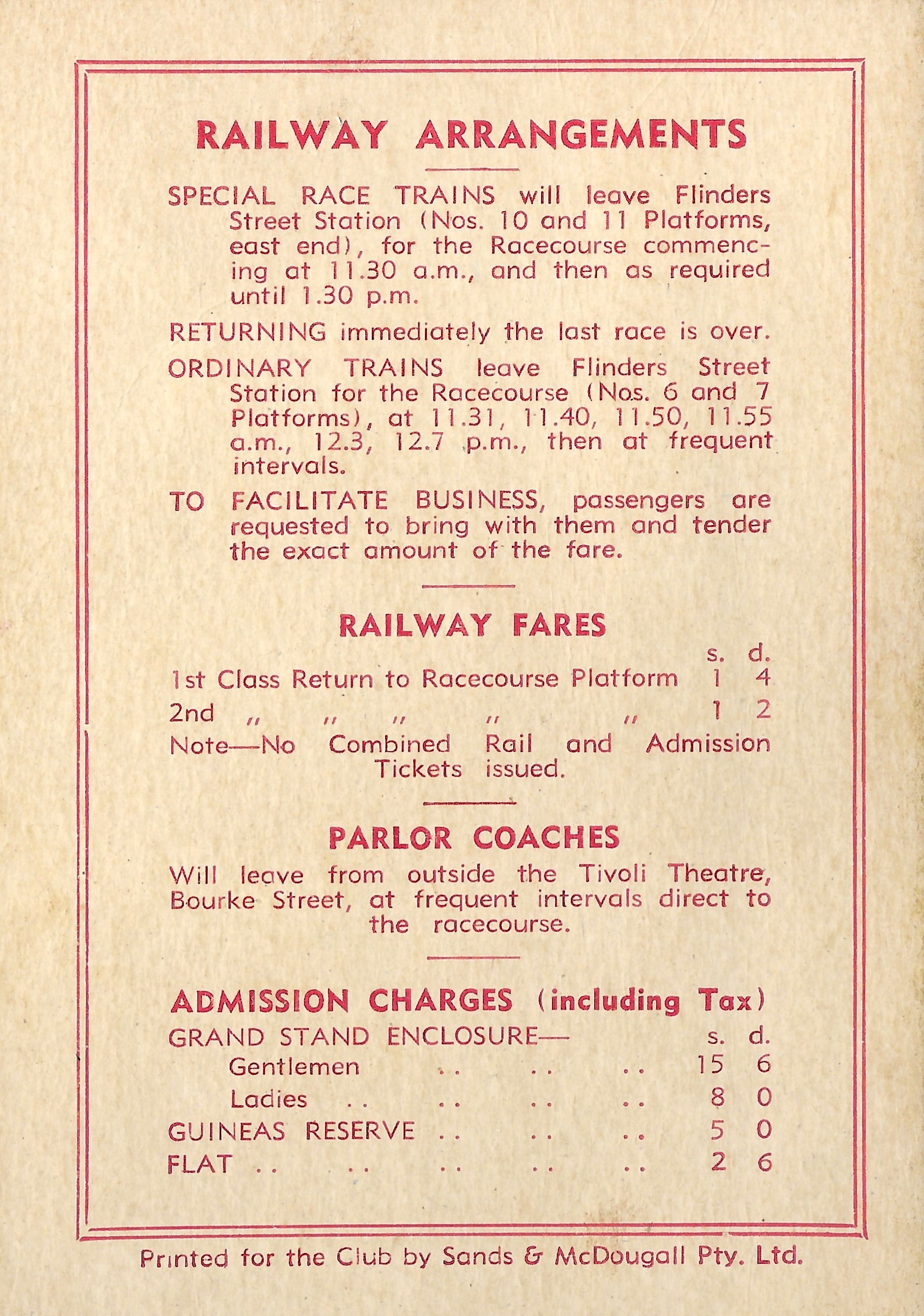
Back cover showing railway arrangements and admission fares

== Winners ==
The following are past winners of the race.

- 2025 - Brayden Star
- 2024 - Herman Hesse
- 2023 - Military Mission
- 2022 - Saracen Knight
- 2021 - Delphi
- 2020 - Chapada
- 2019 - The Chosen One
- 2018 - Yucatan
- 2017 - Lord Fandango
- 2016 - Assign
- 2015 - Amralah
- 2014 - Big Memory
- 2013 - Sea Moon
- 2012 - Shahwardi
- 2011 - Tanby (Note: Shewan finished first in 2011 but was disqualified in 2021 due to prohibited ownership of the horse at the time of running.)
- 2010 - Linton
- 2009 - Alcopop
- 2008 - Dolphin Jo
- 2007 - Master O'Reilly
- 2006 - Growl
- 2005 - Leica Falcon
- 2004 - Rizon
- 2003 - Yakama
- 2002 - The Secondmortgage
- 2001 - Freemason
- 2000 - Majestic Avenue
- 1999 - Rogan Josh
- 1998 - Magneto
- 1997 - Bonsai Pipeline
- 1996 - The Bandette
- 1995 - Unsolved
- 1994 - Solo Show
- 1993 - Great Vintage
- 1992 - Aquidity
- 1991 - Princess Pushy
- 1990 - Just A Dancer
- 1989 - Nayrizi
- 1988 - Congressman
- 1987 - Cossack Warrior
- 1986 - Pharostan
- 1985 - Fil De Roi
- 1984 - Colonial Flag
- 1983 - Nostradamus
- 1982 - Carringbush
- 1981 - Flashing Light
- 1980 - Mr.Independent
- 1979 - Pigalle
- 1978 - Arwon
- 1977 - Impeller
- 1976 - Van der Hum
- 1975 - Suleiman
- 1974 - Big Angel
- 1973 - Gala Supreme
- 1972 - Scotch And Dry
- 1971 - Spectre
- 1970 - Beer Street
- 1969 - Alsop
- 1968 - Impetus
- 1967 - Padtheway
- 1966 - Gala Crest
- 1965 - Captain Blue
- 1964 - Sybeau
- 1963 - Straight Irish
- 1962 - Silver Pelt
- 1961 - Nilarco
- 1960 - Optic Prince
- 1959 - Mac
- 1958 - King Nero
- 1957 - Pandie Sun
- 1956 - Fighting Force
- 1955 - Rising Fast
- 1954 - Wodalla
- 1953 - My Hero
- 1952 - Durham
- 1951 - Durham
- 1950 - Dashing Beau
- 1949 - Dashing Beau
- 1948 - Howe
- 1947 - Riot
- 1946 - Sir Actor
- 1945 - Logical
- 1944 - Claudette
- 1943 - Mac Rob
- 1942 - † Portfolio / Colonus
- 1941 - Historian
- 1940 - Rex Felt
- 1939 - Respirator
- 1938 - Marauder
- 1937 - International
- 1936 - Desert Chief
- 1935 - Red Ray
- 1934 - Broad Arrow
- 1933 - Segati
- 1932 - Scalpel
- 1931 - Shadow King
- 1930 - Second Wind
- 1929 - Taisho
- 1928 - Strephon
- 1927 - Royal Charter
- 1926 - The Banker
- 1925 - Royal Charter
- 1924 - Easingwold
- 1923 - Easingwold
- 1922 - Purser
- 1921 - Eurythmic
- 1920 - Tangalooma
- 1919 - Eusebius
- 1918 - Outlook
- 1917 - Pah King
- 1916 - Cyklon
- 1915 - Burrabadeen
- 1914 - Anna Carlovna
- 1913 - Anna Carlovna
- 1912 - Lady Medallist
- 1911 - Comedy King
- 1910 - Master Soult
- 1909 - Alawa
- 1908 - Alawa
- 1907 - Poseidon
- 1906 - Poseidon
- 1905 - Marvel Loch
- 1904 - Nuncio
- 1903 - Wakeful
- 1902 - Wakeful
- 1901 - Bonnie Chiel
- 1900 - Kinglike
- 1899 - Australian Star
- 1898 - Cocos

† Run in divisions

== See also ==
- Caulfield Guineas
- Ladies Day Vase
- Northwood Plume Stakes
- Schillaci Stakes
- The Might and Power (Caulfield Stakes)
- Toorak Handicap
- List of Australian Group races
- Group races
