= Ray Hutchins =

Australian rules footballer

Personal information
- Full name: Raymond Ferris Hutchins
- Born: 23 March 1929
- Died: 2021 (aged 91–92)

Playing career^{1}
Years	Club	Games (Goals)
1950–51	Melbourne	5 (0)
- ^{1} Playing statistics correct to the end of 1951.

Raymond Ferris Hutchins (23 March 1929 – c. 2021) was an Australian rules footballer who played with Melbourne in the Victorian Football League (VFL).

His father Merv Hutchins founded the Melbourne Under 19's team, which Ray would later coach.
