= 2010 Dubai World Cup =

15th Dubai World Cup
- Dubai World Cup
- Location: Meydan
- Winning horse: Glória de Campeão (BRZ)
- Jockey: T. J. Pereira
- Trainer: Pascal Bary (FR)
- Owner: Stud Estrela Energia

The 2010 Dubai World Cup was a horse race held at Meydan Racecourse on Saturday 27 March 2010. It was the 15th running of the Dubai World Cup. It was the first edition of the Dubai World Cup to be run at Meydan on the synthetic Tapeta surface.

The winner was Stud Estrela Energia's Brazilian-bred Glória de Campeão, a seven-year-old bay horse trained in France by Pascal Bary and ridden by T. J. Pereira. Glória de Campeão's victory was the first in the race for his jockey, trainer and owner and the first for a horse trained in France.

Glória de Campeão had been trained in Brazil in the early part of his career before being transferred to the Bary's French stable in 2007. Although based in France, he was campaigned internationally, racing in Singapore, the United States and Dubai, finishing second in the 2009 Dubai World Cup on dirt and winning the Singapore Airlines International Cup on turf. In the 2010 Dubai World Cup he started a 16/1 outsider and won by a nose from the South African gelding Lizard's Desire, with the Godolphin runner Allybar a short head away in third. The 100/30 favourite Gitano Hernando finished sixth of the fourteen runners.

== Race details ==
- Sponsor: Emirates
- Purse: £6,172,840; First prize: £3,703,704
- Surface: Tapeta
- Going: Standard
- Distance: 10 furlongs
- Number of runners: 14
- Winner's time: 2:03.83

== Full result ==
Pos.	Marg.	Horse (bred)	Age	Jockey	Trainer (Country)	Odds
1		Glória de Campeão (BRZ)	7	T. J. Pereira	Pascal Bary (FR)	16/1
2	nse	Lizard's Desire (SAF)	5	Kevin Shea	Mike de Kock (SAF)	33/1
3	shd	Allybar (IRE)	4	Ahmed Ajtebi	Mahmood Al Zarooni (GB/UAE)	16/1
4	1¼	Gio Ponti (USA)	5	Ramon A. Dominguez	Christophe Clement (USA)	5/1
5	shd	Mastery (GB)	4	Frankie Dettori	Saeed bin Suroor (GB/UAE)	16/1
6	¾	Gitano Hernando (GB)	4	Kieren Fallon	Marco Botti (GB)	100/30 fav
7	nk	Richard's Kid (USA)	5	Garrett Gomez	Bob Baffert (USA)	16/1
8	nk	Mr Brock (SAF)	7	Ryan Moore	Mike de Kock (SAF)	40/1
9	nk	Crowded House (GB)	4	John Velazquez	Brian Meehan (GB)	11/1
10	hd	Twice Over (GB)	5	Tom Queally	Henry Cecil (GB)	11/2
11	2¾	Red Desire (JPN)	4	Christophe Soumillon	Mikio Matsunaga (JPN)	6/1
12	1¼	Vison d'Etat (USA)	5	Olivier Peslier	Eric Libaud (FR)	13/2
13	½	Amor de Pobre (CHI)	5	Aaron Gryder	Jerry Barton (KSA)	66/1
14	4½	Furthest Land (USA)	5	Julien Leparoux	Michael Maker (USA)	40/1

- Abbreviations: nse = nose; nk = neck; shd = head; hd = head; nk = neck

== Winner's details ==
Further details of the winner, Glória de Campeão

- Sex: Stallion
- Foaled: 29 September 2003
- Country: Brazil
- Sire: Impression; Dam: Audacity (Clackson)
- Owner: Stud Estrela Energia
- Breeder: Haras Santarém
