= Derby (horse race) =

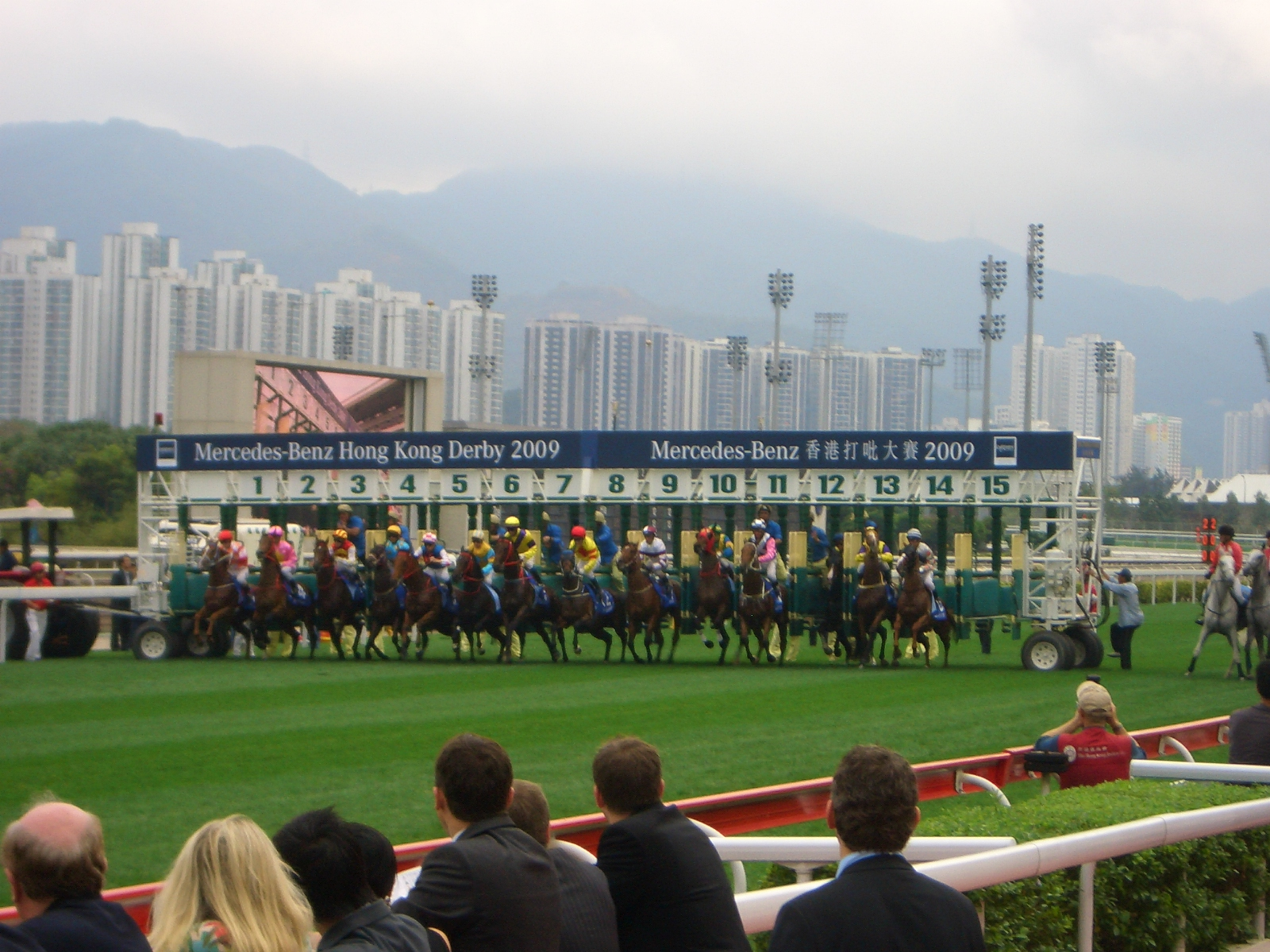
The start of the 2009 Hong Kong Derby.

A derby (UK: /ˈdɑːrbi/ DAR-bee, US: /ˈdɜːrbi/ DUR-bee) is a type of horse race named after the Derby Stakes run at Epsom Downs Racecourse in England. That was in turn named after Edward Smith-Stanley, 12th Earl of Derby, who inaugurated the race in 1780. Perhaps the best-known example after the original is the Kentucky Derby in the United States.

Traditionally, the term "derby" is used strictly to refer to races restricted to three-year-olds, as the English and U.S. Triple Crown races all are. The most notable exceptions to this rule are the Hong Kong Derby and Singapore Derby, restricted to four-year-old Thoroughbreds, and the Canadian Pacing Derby, an annual harness race for "aged pacers" (Standardbreds) four years old and up.

In Scandinavian harness racing the term derby is generally restricted to four-year-olds. An exception is the Finnhorse Derby, which is restricted to five-year-olds.

Name	Place	Distance	Restrictions	First race	Day	Notes
American Derby	Arlington Park, Arlington Heights, Illinois, USA (Note: Location has varied)	1 3/16 miles (1900 m) (Note: Distance has varied)		1884		
Australian Derby (also known as AJC Derby)	Randwick Racecourse, Sydney	2400 metres (1.5 miles)	3 yr olds	1861	Late March or early April	
Bangalore Derby	Bangalore Turf Club	2,000 metres	4 yr olds & up		Mid July	
Danish Derby (Bet25 Derby, The Macallan Derby)	Klampenborg Galopbane	2400 metres	3 yr olds	1910	1st Saturday in August	
Epsom Derby (also known as The Derby, Derby Stakes and the English Derby)	Epsom Downs Racecourse, England	1 mile, 4 furlongs and 10 yards (2423 metres)	3 yr olds colts and fillies	1780	1st Saturday in June (Note: Before 1995, 1st Wednesday in June)	The first and original Derby race.
French Derby (more often known as Prix du Jockey Club)	Chantilly Racecourse	2100 metres (1.30 miles; 10.44 furlongs)	3 yr olds colts and fillies	1836	Early June	
German Derby (Deutsches Derby)	Horner Rennbahn, Hamburg	2,400 metres (1.5 miles)	3 yr olds colts and fillies	1869	Early July	
Hong Kong Derby	Sha Tin Racecourse	2,000 metres	4 yr olds	1873	mid March	
Hungarian Derby (Magyar Derby)	Kincsem Park, Budapest	2,400 metres	3 yr olds	1921	Early July	
Indian Derby	Mahalaxmi Racecourse, Mumbai, Maharashtra, India	2,400 metres	4 yr olds	1943	1st Sunday in Feb.	
Indonesia Derby	various	2,000 metres	3 yr olds above B-class height	1974	Late July to Early August	
Italian Derby (Derby Italiano)	Capannelle Racecourse	2200		1884		
Irish Derby	The Curragh, County Kildare, Ireland	1 1/2 miles (2.4 km)	3 yr olds	1866	Last Sunday in June (Note: Current race date. Dates have varied over time, but have always been in late June or early July.)	
Kentucky Derby	Churchill Downs, Louisville, Kentucky, USA	1 1/4 miles (2 km)	3 yr olds	1875	1st Saturday in May	
New Zealand Derby	Ellerslie Racecourse, Auckland	2400 metres (1.5 miles; 12 furlongs)	3yr olds	1860	1st Saturday in March	
Queensland Derby	Eagle Farm Racecourse, Brisbane	2400 metres (1.5 miles; 12 furlongs)	3yr olds	1868	June	
Romanian Derby (Derby Român)	Ploiești Hippodrome	2,400 metres	3 yr olds colts and fillies	1875	June	
Singapore Derby	Kranji Racecourse	1,800 metres	4 yr olds	1880	Mid July	Final one to be run in 2024
Swedish Trotting Derby (Svenskt Travderby)	Jägersro Racetrack, Malmö	2640 metres (1.64 mi; 13.12 furlongs)	4yr olds	1928	1st Sunday in September	
Tokyo Derby	Ohi Racecourse	2,000 metres	3 yr olds colts and fillies	1955		
Tokyo Yushun; Japanese Derby	Tokyo Racecourse	2,400 metres	3 yr olds colts and fillies	1932	late May or Early June	Currently the richest Derby.
Victoria Derby	Flemington Racecourse	2,500 metres	3 yr olds	1855		
WATC Derby	Ascot Racecourse, Perth	2,400 metres	3yr olds	1888	New Years Day or nearby Saturday	
Notes:

Other

- American Classic Races
- British Classic Races
- French Classic Races
- Thoroughbred horse racing
- Triple Crown of Thoroughbred Racing
