= Raffles Cup =

- Class: Group 1
- Location: Kranji Racecourse; Singapore
- Inaugurated: 1991
- Race type: Thoroughbred - Flat racing
- Website: Singapore Turf Club

Race information
- Distance: 1600 metres (8 furlongs)/1800 metres (9 furlongs)
- Surface: Turf
- Track: Left-handed
- Qualification: Three-years-old & up
- Weight: Weight-for-age; Fillies & Mares: 1.5 kg allowance

The Raffles Cup was a Thoroughbred horse race held annually at Kranji Racecourse in Singapore. Contested on turf over a left-handed course, the domestic Group One race was open to horses age three and older.

The Raffles Cup was inaugurated in 1991 at the Bukit Timah Race Course and raced there through 1999 when the track was closed to be replaced by the new Kranji Racecourse.

It has been raced over a distance of:

- 1,600 metres from 1991 through to 2000
- 1,800 metres from 2001 to 2017
- 1,600 metres from 2018 onwards.

Named for Sir Stamford Raffles, founder of Singapore, the Raffles Cup is the second leg of the Singapore Triple Crown. It is staged after the Kranji Mile and followed by the Singapore Gold Cup.

The 2024 edition was the last held upon cessation of horse racing in Singapore.

== Records ==
Speed record:

- 1600m - 1:33.47 Debt Agent (2018)
- 1800m - 1:46:34 War Affair (2014)

Most wins by a jockey:

- 3 - Kim Clapperton (1993, 1994, 1995)
- 3 - Saimee Jumaat (1998, 2008, 2010)
- 3 - Danny Beasley (2009, 2014, 2021)
- 3 - Michael Rodd (2015, 2016, 2018)
- 3 - Chin Chuen Wong (2023x2, 2024)

Most wins by a trainer:

- 4 - Teh Choon Beng (1991, 1993, 1994, 1995)
- 4 - Laurie Laxon (2001, 2005, 2010, 2015)
- 4 - Daniel Meagher (2013, 2021, 2023x2)

== Winners ==
The following are the winners of the Raffles Cup,

Year	Winner	Jockey	Trainer	Owner	Time
2024	Lim's Saltoro	Chin Chuen Wong	Daniel Meagher		1:34.03
2023 (Sep)	Lim's Kosciuszko	Chin Chuen Wong	Daniel Meagher	Lim's Stable	1:33.81
2023 (Mar)	Lim's Kosciuszko	Chin Chuen Wong	Daniel Meagher	Lim's Stable	1:33.68
2021	Lim's Lightning	Danny Beasley	Daniel Meagher	Lim's Stable	1:34.18
2020	Aramayo	R Maia	Shane Donald Baertschiger		1:36.28
2019	Makanani	Marc Lerner	Hideyuki Takaoka		1:34.20
2018	Debt Agent	Michael Rodd	Clifford Ian Brown		1:33.47
2017	Gilt Complex	Kasim A'Isisuhairi	Clifford Ian Brown		1:47.38 (1800m)
2016	Debt Agent	Michael Rodd	Clifford Ian Brown		1:50.37 (1800m)
2015	Stepitup	Michael Rodd	Laurie Laxon		1:48.01 (1800m)
2014	War Affair	Danny Beasley	Tan Hai Wang		1:46.34 (1800m)
2013	Super Ninetyseven	Alan Munro	Michael Freedman	Joy N Happiness Stable	1:48.20 (1800m)
2012	Flax	Jose Verenzuela	David Hill	Newbury Racing Stable	1:50.03 (1800m)
2011	Always Certain	Vlad Duric	Michael Freedman	Horizon Stable	1:50.40 (1800m)
2010	Better Than Ever	Saimee Jumaat	Laurie Laxon		1:47.38 (1800m)
2009	Cheyenne Dancer	Danny Beasley	Michael Freedman		1:47.07 (1800m)
2008	Chevron	Saimee Jumaat	Charles Leck	Redcap Stable	1:48.0 (1800m)
2007	Lim's Objective	K. B. Soo	John Meagher	Lim's Stable	1:49.0 (1800m)
2006	Lim's Classic	Ismail Saifudin	John Meagher	Lim's Stable	1:51.5 (1800m)
2005	Big Easy	S. Sam	Laurie Laxon	Perfectum Stable	1:50.5 (1800m)
2004	Mayo's Music	Mark Zahra	John Meagher	Kings Stable	1:51.1 (1800m)
2003	Zirna	Mark Du Plessis	Malcolm Thwaites	Westbury Stable	1:49.5 (1800m)
2002	Smart Bet	Grant Cooksley	Mohd Yusof	Smart Bet Stable	1:50.0 (1800m)
2001	Tapildo	Eddie Wilkinson	Laurie Laxon	Silver Fern Racing Stable	1:49.3 (1800m)
2000	Con Air	Craig Carmody	Don Baertschiger	Sally A. Baertschiger	1:35.7
1999	Ouzo	Saimee Jumaat	Malcolm Thwaites	Eres Tu No 2 Stable	1:35.0
1998	Flint Zest	Michael Coleman	Francis Nathan	Good Field Stable	1:41.2
1997	Hippo Valour	K. C. Ng	Charles Leck	Good Field Stable	1:34.9
1996	Emerald Isles	W. H. Lao	Charles Leck	Aspiration Stable	1:34.2
1995	Starman II	Kim Clapperton	Teh Choon Beng	Auric Stable	1:34.7
1994	The Mailman	Kim Clapperton	Teh Choon Beng	Auric Stable	1:34.8
1993	Storm	Kim Clapperton	Teh Choon Beng	Auric Stable	1:37.6
1992	Hard Rock	Rick Dominguez	K. C. Yeoh	Kuo Stable	1:38.2
1991	Tuneful Melody	Ismail Ismadi	Teh Choon Beng	Chen's Stable	1:36.2
