= Garnet Bougoure =

Personal information
- Born: 3 March 1923 Dalby, Queensland, Australia
- Died: 22 November 2008 (aged 85)
- Occupation: Jockey

Horse racing career
- Sport: Horse racing
- Career wins: Not found

Major racing wins
- As a jockey: Doomben Cup (1942, 1944); Doncaster Handicap (1945); Stradbroke Handicap (1946); Australian Cup (1949); Brisbane Cup (1951); Sultan Gold Vase (1954, 1958); Singapore Gold Cup (1955); Perak Derby (1958); Singapore St Leger (1958); Irish St. Leger (1959,1963); Irish Derby (1960, 1963); Irish 2,000 Guineas (1961); Selangor Gold Cup (1962); Timeform Gold Cup (1962); K. George VI & Q. Elizabeth Stakes (1963); Eclipse Stakes (1963, 1964); Penang Gold Cup (1967); Singapore Derby (1968, 1969) British Classic Race wins: Epsom Oaks (1963); St. Leger Stakes (1963); 1,000 Guineas Stakes (1964) As a trainer: Queen Elizabeth II Cup (1974); Lion City Cup (1978, 1981, 1992); Sultan Gold Vase (1978); Penang Gold Cup (1981); Penang Sprint Trophy (1984)

Racing awards
- Irish flat racing Champion Jockey (1960)

Significant horses
- Noblesse, Ragusa, Pourparler, Khalkis

Garnet Bougoure (3 March 1923 – 22 November 2008) was an Australian jockey in Thoroughbred horse racing who was highly successful competing in South-East Asia and in Europe.

Bougoure was still a boy when he left his home in Dalby, Queensland, to pursue a career as a jockey at racetracks in the Brisbane area. In 1945 he won his first major race and went on to win a number of premier events including two editions of the Australian Cup. He competed for the last time in Australia in 1952 and the following year accepted a contract to ride in India. Then, in 1954 he spent five months in France before moving to ride in Singapore and Malaysia. At the Perak Turf Club racecourse in Ipoh, Perak, Malaysia, he won the 1954 Sultan Gold Vase, repeating as winner in 1958 when he also won the Perak Derby. In 1955, he won the prestigious Singapore Gold Cup at the Bukit Timah Race Course.

In the late 1950s Bougoure returned to race in Europe where his association with trainer Vincent O'Brien and Paddy Prendergast helped make him one of the top jockeys in Ireland and England during the first half of the 1960s. He became the only Australian to lead the jockeys' list in Ireland, accomplishing the feat in 1960. His success in 1963 helped make Prendergast the first Irish-based trainer to ever win the British trainers' title. Bougoure's numerous wins in Ireland include the 1960 and 1963 runnings of the Irish Derby and in England he won three of the Classics, taking the 1963 Epsom Oaks with the filly Noblesse, the 1963 St. Leger Stakes with Ragusa and in 1964 the 1,000 Guineas Stakes aboard Pourparler.

Garnet Bougoure returned to Singapore during the second half of the 1960s where he continued to riding until retiring in 1969. He then embarked on a career in training that would last several decades until leaving the sport completely in 1995 at age seventy-three. Bougoure returned to Australia to be close to his children and died there in Frankston in 2008. He was predeceased by his wife Margaret Moore, the sister of jockey George Moore, who died in 1983.

Garney Bougoure was a cousin of Doug Bougoure who notably trained Strawberry Road.
