= John F. Meagher =

John Meagher
- John Meagher & Danny Beasley

Personal information
- Born: 17 September 1948 (age 78) Melbourne, Australia
- Occupation: Trainer

Horse racing career
- Sport: Horse racing
- Career wins: not found

Major racing wins
- Melbourne Cup (1985); Singapore Gold Cup (2000); Kranji Mile (2004, 2006); Raffles Cup (2004, 2006, 2007)

Honours
- Australian Racing Hall of Fame (2019)

Significant horses
- What A Nuisance, Mayo's Music
- Updated on 14 May 2019

John Francis Meagher (born 17 September 1948 in Melbourne, Australia) is an Australian Racing Hall of Fame Thoroughbred racehorse trainer.

He is a Melbourne Cup winning trainer who relocated to Singapore from Melbourne in 1999. Meagher trained What A Nuisance to a win in the 1985 Melbourne Cup. Ridden by Pat Hyland and owned by Lloyd Williams the win was particularly memorable for the attendance of Prince Charles and Lady Diana who presented the winning connections with the famous trophy. It was also the first Melbourne Cup to offer $1,000,000 in prize money.

Meagher was inducted into the Australian Racing Hall of Fame in 2019.

== Group wins in Singapore ==
=== Group 1's ===
Race	Horse	Jockey
Singapore Gold Cup	Kim Angel	Mick Dittman
Raffles Cup	Mayo's Music	Mark Zahra
Raffles Cup	Lim's Classic	I. Saifudin
Raffles Cup	Lim's Objective	K.B. Soo
Kranji Mile	Recast	O. Chavez
Lion City Cup	Arenti	S. King
Patrons Bowl	Taurus	A. Spiteri

=== Group 2's ===
Race	Horse	Jockey
Pattiti Gold Trophy	Kim Angel	Mick Dittman
Queen Elizabeth II Cup, Singapore	Exaggerate	J. Saimee
E.W. Barker Trophy	Exaggerate	I. Azhar
Kranji Mile	Mayo's Music	J. Patton
E.W. Barker Trophy	Recast	M. Pumpa
Three Year Old Challenge	Lim's Objective	K.B. Soo

=== Group 3's ===
Race	Horse	Jockey
Jumbo Jet Trophy	Kim Angel	Mick Dittman
Jumbo Jet Trophy	Exaggerate	J. Patton
Jumbo Jet Trophy	Arenti	K.B. Soo
Pattiti Gold Trophy	Lim's Grand	K.B. Soo
Pattiti Gold Trophy	Lim's Grand	K.B. Soo
Three Year Old Challenge (1st Leg)	Lim's Objective	K.B. Soo
Three Year Old Challenge (1st Leg)	Recast	J. Taylor
Singapore Guineas	Recast	J. Taylor
Committees Prize	Exaggerate	J. Saimee
Chairman's Trophy	Mayo's Music	Mark Zahra
Tiger Beer Challenge (1st Leg)	Always Mine	J. Saimee
Juvenile Championship	Lim's Grand	T. Ong
Stewards Cup	Lim's Zerperb	K.B. Soo
Three Year Old Challenge (2nd Leg)	Lim's Ransom	K.B. Soo
Three Rings Trophy	Arenti	K.B. Soo
Kranji Sprint	Lim's Fighter	D. Azis
