= Kranji Racecourse =

Former race course in Kranji, Singapore

Coordinates: 1.422841°N 103.763552°E

- Interactive map of Kranji Racecourse
- Location: 1 Turf Club Avenue, Singapore 738078
- Owned by: Singapore Turf Club
- Date opened: 4 March 2000; 26 years ago
- Date closed: 1 January 2026; 6 months ago
- Capacity: 30,000
- Race type: Thoroughbred, Flat racing
- Notable races: Singapore Airlines International Cup; KrisFlyer International Sprint; Singapore Derby; Kranji Mile; Raffles Cup; Singapore Gold Cup; Lion City Cup; Patrons' Bowl

The Singapore Racecourse is a venue for thoroughbred horse racing, situated in Kranji, next to the Kranji MRT station. Built and operated by the Singapore Turf Club (STC), it opened on 4 March 2000, replacing the Bukit Timah Race Course.

== History ==
In 1994, STC appointed a team comprising Indeco Consultants and Ewing Cole Cherry and Brott to design the Kranji Racecourse.

A trial run of the racecourse with 5,000 visitors was done on 31 July and 1 August 1999.

On 25 September 1999, Kranji Racecourse hosted its inaugural race, which was also Singapore's first night race. However after the first race, which started at 5.30pm SST, was concluded, a power trip caused a power failure, resulting in subsequent races being postponed. President Wee Kim Wee, who was the patron of STC, arrived during the power failure and had to wait outside of the racecourse complex till power was restored. Power was restored after about two hours later and the second race was restarted at 7.50pm. As a result of the delay, the last race which was to be the eighth race for the night was cancelled. STC later said the power trip was due to an electrical fault at four of the 41 light masts around the track.

In January 2023, it was announced that the site of the racecourse will be returned to the government for redevelopment by March 2027. The final horse race, held on 5 October 2024, saw 10,000 attendees. The first home in the new residential neighbourhood at the site of the racecourse is expected to be ready by 2035. Development of a detailed plan for the site will begin in 2026.

== Features ==
The racecourse covered 124 hectares has a capacity of 30,000 spectators with a five-storey grandstand. The main racetrack is 31m wide and 2,000m long on the long course and turfed with El Toro-Zoysia grass.

It also has 41 light masts, allowing night races to be conducted at the racecourse.

== Transport ==
Kranji MRT station is linked to the race course by a sheltered walkway. Designed to accommodate crowds visiting STC during race events, Kranji station is the largest station on the Woodlands Extension. The 1,300 m^{2} (14,000 sq ft) concourse level is three times larger than those at other stations with many fare gates to allow efficient crowd flow. The station has twice the number of escalators and stairs (four escalators and two stairs) and the direction of the escalators could be varied depending on the crowd flow.
