= 1985 Melbourne Cup =

Edition of the Melbourne Cup

- Melbourne Cup
- Location: Flemington Racecourse
- Date: 5 Nov 1985
- Distance: 3200 Meters
- Winning horse: What A Nuisance
- Winning time: 3:23.0
- Final odds: 15/1
- Jockey: Pat Hyland
- Trainer: John F. Meagher
- Surface: Turf

Our Boyfriend two in front of Butternut, then Koiro Corrie May, What a Nuisance, Fil De Roi under the whip, Tristarc went to the fence, from Tripsacum, Imaprince coming with a great run. Koiro Corrie May has got to this one Our Boyfriend with Butternut, What a Nuisance, Imaprice and Fil De Roi. What a Nuisance goes to Koiro Corrie May, Korio Corrie May and What a Nuisance, What a Nuisance wins the Foster's Melbourne Cup! A nose to Korio Corrie May.

— Commentator Bruce McAvaney describes the climax of the race

The 1985 Melbourne Cup was a two-mile handicap horse race which took place on Tuesday, 5 November 1985. The race, run over 3,200 metres (1.988 mi), at Flemington Racecourse.

The 1985 Melbourne Cup was won by What A Nuisance a horse who had just recovered from a damaged suspensory ligament. This running of the race was notably for many reasons as it was the first horse race in Australia to have a prize pool of $AU1,000,000 and it was also the first time the Melbourne Cup was sponsored as it was sponsored by Foster's. Legendary commentator Bruce McAvaney called his first Melbourne Cup for Network 10, he would go on to call three more.

== Field ==
This is a list of horses which ran in the 1985 Melbourne Cup.

Place	Horse	Trainer	Jockey
1st	What A Nuisance	John F. Meagher	Pat Hyland
2nd	Koiro Corrie May	Dave O'Sullivan	Lance O'Sullivan
3rd	Tripsacum	J P Gaffney	Robert Hefferman
4th	Fil De Roi	I A MacDonald	Ron Quinton
5th	Butternut	Doug Baertschigar	M Riley
6th	Our Boyfriend	Sir Mark Todd	Mark Barnsley
7th	Imaprince	B Preston	Brent Thomson
8th	Tristarc	R S McDonald	W Trealor
9th	Black Knight	George Hanlon	Peter Cook
10th	Our Sophia	George Hanlon	Harry White
11th	Kiwi	Snow Lupton	Noel Harris
12th	Dusky Legend	S A Mackinnon	P Alderman
13th	Duanette's Girl	J A Gibbs	David Peake
14th	Mapperley Heights	Colin Hayes	Darren Gauci
15th	Silver Award	R W Guy	Mick Dittman
16th	Sir Zephyr	B J Smith	John Duggan
17th	Hayai	J Lee	John Letts
18th	Late Show	Brian Mayfield-Smith	Jim Cassidy
19th	Lacka Reason	M K Bull	Gary Willetts
20th	Under Oath	Colin Hayes	Michael Clarke
21st	Spritely Native	M G Lees	W Harris
22nd	Rising Prince	Deidre Stein	K Langby
23rd	Foxseal	Rick Hore-Lacy	P D Johnson
