= Pat Hyland (jockey) =

Australian jockey and horse trainer (1941–2026)

Pat Hyland (1941 – 2 March 2026) was an Australian jockey and horse trainer who is best known for riding What A Nuisance to victory in the 1985 Melbourne Cup. His son, Chris Hyland, is also a successful horse trainer.

== Life and career ==
Hyland was born in Port Fairy in 1941.

=== Racing career ===
His riding career extended from 1956 to 1990 and produced 2,382 winners, including 30 winners in Group 1 races. He famously won Australian horseracing's four grand slam races:

- Caulfield Cup (Affinity, 1984)
- W. S. Cox Plate (Star Affair, 1965)
- Golden Slipper (Vain, 1969)
- Melbourne Cup (What A Nuisance, 1985).

At the 1964 Flemington autumn carnival, Hyland won the Newmarket Handicap (Rashlore) on the first day, the Australian Cup (Grand Print) on the Monday, the C. M. Lloyd Stakes (Samson) on the Thursday and the Queen Elizabeth Stakes (Grand Print) on the final day, winning the four feature races at the meeting.

He also won the:

- Victoria Derby on Craftsman and Silver Sharpe
- VRC Oaks on Rom's Stiletto.

=== Training career ===
After retiring from riding Hyland began a training career. He trained more than 500 winners.

His first Group 1 success was Saleous in the 1995 VRC Oaks. This gave him the distinction of winning the race both as a jockey and a trainer, having ridden Rom's Stiletto to victory in 1982.

Other Group 1 winners included:

- Zarita, winner of the 2008 Group 1 South Australian Derby and Australasian Oaks and five Group 2 races.
- Bonaria, winner of the 2014 Myer Classic.

Hyland and his wife Maree had six children: a daughter and five sons. He died on 2 March 2026 at the age of 84.
