= Better Than Ever =

Australian-bred Thoroughbred racehorse

- Sire: French Deputy (USA)
- Grandsire: Deputy Minister (CAN)
- Dam: Songfest
- Damsire: Unbridled's Song (USA)
- Sex: Gelding
- Foaled: 2006
- Country: Australia
- Colour: Bay
- Breeder: W G H G & K B Bax
- Owner: Tang Weng Fei of Jupiter Stable
- Trainer: Laurie Laxon
- Record: 26 starts: 16 wins
- Earnings: SGP $1,054,936+

Major wins
- Singapore Guineas; Jumbo Jet Trophy; Raffles Cup; Kranji Mile

Awards
- nominated for 2010 Aushorse Marketing Australian-bred Champion
- Last updated on 24 February 2011

Better Than Ever, is a Thoroughbred racehorse gelding that was foaled in 2006, in Australia. He is the first racehorse to establish a streak of 10 consecutive wins on the Malayan Racing Association circuit.

== Breeding ==
He is a bay gelding, with a star and stripe on his head that was bred by Graham, Helen-Gaye and Kylie Bax in New Zealand. Better Than Ever was by the international sire, French Deputy (USA) who stood at stud in USA in 1997, in Japan in 2002, and in Australia in 2003. His progeny includes over 200 winners with 29 stakes winners and earnings of A$32 million. French Deputy was the Champion First Season Sire of Japan in 2004. Better Than Ever’s dam, Songfest, was by Unbridled's Song ((USA) won the Group One (G1) Breeders' Cup Juvenile and the Florida Derby, but was disappointing as an Australian sire). Songfest was the dam of several other winners.

Better Than Ever was exported to New Zealand on 28 November 2006. He was later offered at the Karaka 2008 Premier Yearling Sale by the Blandford Lodge stud of Matamata, New Zealand and was purchased by the trainer, Laurie Laxon of Singapore for $80,000.

After the sale, Better Than Ever was then sent to Brett McDonald for 12 months of education and his two trial starts at Cambridge, New Zealand.

== Racing record ==
Better Than Ever mainly raced in Singapore and jockey Saimee Jumaat rode him in most of his victories.

=== 2009 ===
His first start and win was on 2 August 2009 in a restricted maiden race over 1,200 metres (m) for $26,659.

On 1 November 2009, Better Than Ever had his first Black Type start in the (G3) $153,180 Steward's Cup over 1,400 metres, which he won by 1½ lengths.

=== 2010 ===
Better Than Ever commenced the New Year with a win on 29 January 2010 in the G3 Three Rings Trophy race over 1,400 m., by three lengths, ridden this time by J Moreira. His other wins for the year were the G3 Singapore Three-Year-Old Sprint and the G2 Singapore Three Year Old Classic over 1,400m. Saimee Jumaat rode Better Than Ever to an easy win in the Group One, $500,000, Singapore Guineas over 1,600 metres at Kranji. His winning margin was 3½ lengths from Waikato, producing a stable quinella, with Ghozi third a further 1¼ lengths away. He next won the weight-for-age (w.f.a.) G3 Jumbo Jet Trophy G3 (1,400m) by 3½ lengths to take his undefeated race record to 10 wins from 10 starts. This win made him the first horse on the Malayan Racing Association circuit to establish a run of 10 consecutive wins.

In February 2011, Better Than Ever had a tally of 13 wins from 14 race starts, including the G1 Raffles Cup over 1,800 metres and the G1 Kranji Mile over 1,600 m, plus the G2 3YO Classic over 1,400 m.

=== 2011 ===
In his first start in 2011, Better than Ever won the Singapore Grade 3 Stakes. In his second start of that year, he finished 14th in the Dubai Duty Free at Meydan Racecourse. His overall record as of 30 March 2011 was 16 starts for 14 wins and earnings of $1,337,680. In his start at the Dubai Duty Free race on 26 March, he finished 14th.

=== 2012-13 ===
He returned to New Zealand after breeding and returned to racing. He placed in three group races and went on to win his final race, the 2013 Awapuni Gold Cup (Group 2, 2000m).

Better Than Ever retired at Hippocampus Stud in Cambridge NZ with his breeder, Kylie Bax.

== See also ==
- List of leading Thoroughbred racehorses
