= Singapore Gold Cup =

- Class: Group 1
- Location: Singapore Turf Club; Singapore
- Inaugurated: 1924
- Race type: Thoroughbred – Flat racing
- Website: Singapore Turf Club

Race information
- Distance: 2,000 metres (1.2 miles)
- Surface: Turf
- Track: Left-handed
- Qualification: Three-year-olds & up
- Weight: Handicap
- Purse: S$1,000,000

The Singapore Gold Cup was a Thoroughbred horse race held annually in November at the Singapore Turf Club. Contested on turf over a left-handed course, the domestic Group 1 race was run over a distance of 2,000 metres and was open to local horses age three and older.

== History ==
Inaugurated in 1924 at the Serangoon Road Race Course at Farrer Park, the Singapore Gold Cup was raced there until 1933, after which it was moved to the new Bukit Timah Race Course. It remained there until 1999 when the Bukit Timah facility was closed, to be replaced with a new Singapore Turf Club situated at Kranji.

The first Singapore Gold Cup, held in 1924 at Farrer Park, was won by Thelasocrete, who took home the prizemoney of $1,600.

In 1958 Abdul Mawi became the first local jockey to win the Gold Cup.

In 1995 New Zealand jockey Kim Clapperton was the first female rider to win the Gold Cup.

In 2008 El Dorado won the event, making him the first ever Japanese-bred horse trained in Singapore to win a Singapore Group 1 race.

To mark its move from Bukit Timah to Kranji in 1999, Singapore Turf Club raised the prizemoney to $1 million and opened the race to international contenders, but the race returned to domestic status three years later. The residency conditions are specified on the Singapore Turf Club website.

As a result of World War II, no race was run from 1942 through 1947.

Since inception, the race has been contested over various distances:

- 2,000 metres: 2018 to 2024
- 2,011 metres: 1924–1931, 1933–1935, 1948, 1965–1968
- 2,011 (about): 1936–1941, 1948, 1953–1964
- 2,044 metres: 1949–1952
- 2,212 metres: 1969–1975
- 2,200 metres: 1976–2017
- 2,414 metres: 1932

In 2023, citing the need for more land for affordable housing, the Singapore Turf Club announced the cessation of horse racing in Singapore after 182 years. The final Singapore Gold Cup was run on October 5, 2024, under the name the "Grand Singapore Gold Cup", and was won by Smart Star.

== Records ==
Speed record: (at a distance of 2000 metres)

- 2:00.45 – Smart Star (2024)

Most wins:

- 3 – Three Rings (1954, 1956, 1957)
- 3 – El Dorado (2008, 2009, 2011)

Most wins by an owner:

- 5 – Auric Stable (1974, 1977, 1985, 1991, 1995)

Most wins by a jockey:

- 3 – Thomas Farthing (1936, 1939, 1941)
- 3 – Alan J. Trevena (1963, 1966, 1968)
- 3 - Ronnie Stewart (2008, 2009, 2011)

Most wins by a trainer:

- 9 – Ivan Allan (1973, 1976, 1978, 1980, 1981, 1982, 1984, 1989, 1990)

== Winners ==
Year	Winner	Jockey	Trainer	Owner	Time
2024	Smart Star	Muzi Yeni	David Kok	Smart Bet	2:00.45
2023	Lim's Kosciuszko	Marc Lerner	Dan Meagher	Lim Siah Mong	2:00.67
2022	Hong Kong Great	Mark Zahra	Ricardo Le Grange	Edmond Yue Kwok Yin	2:00.86
2021	Lim's Lightning	Danny Beasley	Daniel Meagher	Lim’s Stable	2:02.05
2020	Big Hearted	Simon Kok Wei Hoong	Michael Clements	Falcon Racing No 7 Stable	2:03.90
2019	Mr Clint	Craig Williams	Lee Freedman	Oscar Racing Stable	2:01.02
2018	Elite Invincible	Ronald Woodworth	Mark Walker	Elite Performance Stable	2:02.79
2017	Gilt Complex	Michael Rodd	Clifford Brown	Graham Christopher Mackie	2:14.37
2016	Bahana	Craig Williams	Stephen Gray	Dago Stable	2:17.42
2015	Cooptado	Rizuan Shafiq	Patrick Bernard Shaw	Red Stable	2:14.69
2014	Quechua	Corey Brown	Ricardo Le Grange	Avengers Stable	2:15.07
2013	Tropaios	Tommy Berry	Michael John Freedman	China Horse Club Stable	2:16.46
2012	Better Life	Alan Munro	Hideyuki Takaoka	Suzuka Racing Stable	2:18.33
2011	El Dorado	Ronnie Stewart	Hideyuki Takaoka	Big Valley Stable	2:20.24
2010	Risky Business	Glen Boss	Steven Burridge	Results Stable	2:15.61
2009	El Dorado	Ronnie Stewart	Hideyuki Takaoka	Big Valley Stable	2:14.8
2008	El Dorado	Ronnie Stewart	Hideyuki Takaoka	Big Valley Stable	2:16.7
2007	Recast	Opie Bosson	Laurie Laxon	Kings Stable	2:15.3
2006	Mr Line	Jeff Lloyd	Patrick Shaw	Quartet Stable	2:17.5
2005	Terfel	Soo Khoon Beng	Daniel J. Murphy	Daniel J. Murphy	2:18.1
2004	Raul	Mark Du Plessis	Laurie Laxon	Perfectum Stable	2:20.3
2003	Zirna	Mark Du Plessis	Malcolm Thwaites	Westbury Stable	2:21.5
2002	Smart Bet	Grant Cooksley	Mohd Yusof	Smart Bet Stable	2:19.4
2001	Kutub	Frankie Dettori	Saeed bin Suroor	Godolphin Racing	2:15.1
2000	Kim Angel	Mick Dittman	John Meagher	Kimmui's Stable	2:15.4
1999	Carry The Flag	Brett Doyle	Michael Kent	Dragon Stable	2:15.1
1998	Three Crowns †	S. Price	Malcolm Thwaites	Lucky Stable	2:22.3
1997	Lucky Treasure	Oo Khuang Liang	Malcolm Thwaites	Lucky Stable	2:13.6
1996	Zatopek II	Saimee Jumaat	Malcolm Thwaites	Eres Tu Stable	2:12.5
1995	Grand Jury	Kim Clapperton	Teh Choon Beng	Auric Stable	2:13.5
1994	Lee's Bid	S. Y. Leong	Yashaiya Bin Ahmad	Nikko Stable	2:14.9
1993	Navajo II	Wayne Harris	Malcolm Thwaites	Eres Tu Stable	2:13.6
1992	Village Kid	Thangaraju Asogan	H. B. Lim	Village Kid Stable	2:13.9
1991	Starman	David Walsh	Teh Choon Beng	Auric Stable	2:14.2
1990	Danzadancer	Rick Dominguez	Ivan Allan	Swettenham Stable	2:14.0
1989	Colonial Chief	Oo Khuang Liang	Ivan Allan	Promise Stable	2:19.9
1988	Trend Defy	A. John	Malcolm Thwaites	Shirley Yap	2:18.0
1987	Feu Vert	K. C. Ng	Charlie Read	Ace-In-The-Hole Stable	2:16.9
1986	St Gallen	Mark Sestich	Charlie Read	Equus Stable	2:14.7
1985	Best Bold	Nigel Tiley	Teh Choon Beng	Auric Stable	2:18.9
1984	Big Chief	Tony Cruz	Ivan Allan	Datuk Amar et al.	2:23.5
1983	Freedom Fighter II	Graham Cook	A. Buang	Freedom Stable	2:21.0
1982	Siapa Rajah IV	Terry G. Lucas	Ivan Allan	Amar Wee Hood Teck	2:17.3
1981	Taman Singapura	Gerry Donnelly	Ivan Allan	Loh Pia Kee Stable	2:21.6
1980	Saas Fee	John A. Murray	Ivan Allan	Equus Stable	2:16.5
1979	Bold Hunter	C. H. Ooi	Ahmad Bin A.Samad	Sean Stable	2:18.9
1978	Saas Fee	Noel Harris	Ivan Allan	Equus Stable	2:19.8
1977	Sir Toby	Taffy Thomas	Teh Choon Beng	Auric Stable	2:21.8
1976	San Retta	Terry G. Lucas	Ivan Allan	Redcap Stable	2:22.2
1975	Wonderful Surprise II	M. C. Lam	S. Osman	Agasam Stable	2:19.2
1974	Man of Courage II	Johnny L. Wilson	Teh Choon Beng	Auric Stable	2:19.4
1973	Firebrand	Des Coleman	Ivan Allan	TBL Stable	2:21.0
1972	Hard To Beat	R. G. Kingston	E. Donnelly	Jacky's Stable	2:33.5
1971	Sungei Wang II	Rod C. Dawkins	M. Mansor	D. & D. Chong Kok Lim	2:17.6
1970	Interest	Johnny L. Wilson	Eddie T. van Breukelen	Joon Stable	2:18.6
1969	Katong Ocean	Glynn M. Pretty	Eddie T. van Breukelen	Lucky Stable	2:17.8
1968	Moonbeam	Alan J. Trevena	Eddie T. van Breukelen	Ng Khoon Khoon	2:09.4
1967	Columbo Court	Subian Dalwee	J. Donnelly	Asiatic Stable	2:05.4
1966	Grenadier	Alan J. Trevena	Rinus van Breukelen	L K Ng	2:14.8
1965	Grenadier	L. G. Coles	Rinus van Breukelen	L K Ng	2:08.4
1964	Pulau Pangkor	Sonny Lim	Rinus van Breukelen	Ng & Ng Stable	2:14.2
1963	Resquilleur	Alan J. Trevena	Eddie T. van Breukelen	Veni Vici Stable	2:04.6
1962	Water Scout	S. Khamis	John Rodgers	Salamat Stable	2:09.0
1961	Balkan Bambino	C. O. Dragon	K. R. Daniels	Result Stable	2:11.0
1960	Rina	N. L. McGrowdie	K. R. Daniels	L & T Stable	2:07.6
1959	Lord Arrogance	D. L. Jones	K. Y. Lee	J. Schuyt	2:07.4
1958	Straits Code	Abdul Mawi	Rinus van Breukelen	Mr & Mrs T H Teo	2:10.6
1957	Three Rings	W. K. Camer	John Rodgers	E. J. Tan	2:08.8
1956	Three Rings	D. G. Paterson	John Rodgers	E. J. Tan	2:16.2
1955	Bearer Bond	Garnet Bougoure	Rinus van Breukelen	Mr & Mrs S K Foo	2:14.8
1954	Three Rings	Harry McCloud	John Rodgers	E. J. Tan	2:05.4
1953	Mubarak	Harry McCloud	John Rodgers	Salamat Stable	2:05.4
1952	Entertainment II	C. M. Tulloh	J. Spencer	Entertainment II	2:08.2
1951	Red Carnation	G. Woods	C. Parker	Mdm TH Oei	2:10.4
1950	Tara Street	W. S. Bagby	W. Lewis	S C Wong et al.	2:08.8
1949	Longchamps II	E. Donnelly	M. van Breukelen	M/M Yeo Hock Seng	2:09.2
1948	Leoda	W. T. Lawler	T. Fox	L. Melville Thompson	2:10.0
1941	Grand Prix	T. Farthing	M. van Breukelen	Mr. Eddie	2:07.2
1940	Mystic Music	F. C. Mayo	T. Menzies	Mrs T. Menzies	2:09.8
1939	Cooltipt	T. Farthing	M. van Breukelen	Mining Kongsi	2:12.0
1938	Golden Glimpse	W. L. White	N. Hobbs	O. Struges	2:07.0
1937	Blue Peter	G. Woods	T. Fox	T. Fox & F. Handley	2:05.6
1936	Cockpen	T. Farthing	J. Duval	A. van Tooren	2:07.6
1935	Bestlot	E. H. Dawson	G. Magill	Mac Kongsi	2:07.6
1934	Fiesole	W. Christie	M. van Breukelen	M. van Breukelen	2:10.0
1933	Row Boat	C. O. Davies	W. Redfearn	Anam Kongsi	2:09.0
1932	Punkawalla	William Irvine	M. van Breukelen	Teoh Kon Moh	2:38.4
1931	Lightarmed	C. V. Whalan	J. Duval	Alan Loke	2:10.6
1930	Abbot's Gift	E. Donnelly	J. Duval	H. Helling	2:09.4
1929	Cafe Royal	G. Robinson	P. Logue	Sultan of Perak	2:07.2
1928	Millicent	F. C. Mayo	J. Orchard	T. Memzies	2:14.4
1927	Barbara Godolphin	B. Hayes	E. Bowden	A. Dick	2:11.4
1926	Sultan	T. C. Thompson	T. Woodgate	Alan Loke	2:04.4
1925	Bonnie Friend	A. W. Sleigh	W. Redfearn	I. Ellison	2:13.6
1924	Thelasocrete	A. Heterick	A. Heterick	JM Stable	2:05.6

- † 2004 winner Raul was originally named Devil's Gossip.
- † 1998 winner Three Crowns was originally named Interval.
