= Al Maktoum Mile =

- Class: Group 2
- Location: Meydan Racecourse; Dubai, United Arab Emirates
- Inaugurated: 1994
- Race type: Thoroughbred - Flat racing

Race information
- Distance: 1,600 metres
- Surface: Dirt
- Track: Left-handed
- Purse: $250,000 (2015)

The Al Maktoum Mile, is a horse race run over a distance of 1,600 metres (1 mile) in late December on dirt at Meydan Racecourse in Dubai. Previously known as the Al Maktoum Challenge, Round 1 it was the first of three races in the Al Maktoum Challenge series which serve as trial races for the Dubai World Cup.

It was first run in 1994 on dirt at Nad Al Sheba Racecourse. It was transferred to Meydan in 2010 where it was run on the synthetic Tapeta Footings surface. In 2015 the synthetic surface at Meydan was replaced by a dirt track.

The race began as an ungraded stakes race before attaining Listed status in 1996. The race was elevated to Group 3 level in 2002 and became a Group 2 event in 2013.

The distance of the race changed from 1600 metres (8 furlongs). For the 2023–24 racing season the event was renamed to the Al Maktoum Mile and moved to be held in late December.

== Records ==
Record time:

- 1:35.48 - Spindrift (1999)

Most wins by a horse:

- 2 - Le Bernardin (2016, 2017)

Most wins by a jockey:

- 4 - Frankie Dettori (1996, 1997, 2009, 2011)

Most wins by a trainer:

- 8 - Saeed bin Suroor (1996, 1997, 1999, 2000, 2001, 2009, 2011, 2014)

Most wins by an owner:

- 6 - Godolphin Racing (1995, 1996, 1997, 2001, 2009, 2014)

== Winners ==
Year	Winner	Age	Jockey	Trainer	Owner	Time
1994	Red Rainbow	6	Johnny Murtagh	Dhruba Selvaratnam	Jaffar Ali	1:39.20
1995	Halling	4	John Carroll	Saeed bin Suroor	Godolphin	1:38.40
1996	Tamayaz	4	Frankie Dettori	Saeed bin Suroor	Godolphin	1:37.18
1997	Kammtarra	4	Frankie Dettori	Saeed bin Suroor	Godolphin	1:35.62
1998	Wathik	8	Paul Eddery	Paddy Rudkin	Saeed Al Ghandi	1:37.63
1999	Spindrift	4	Gary Hind	Saeed bin Suroor	Rashid bin Mohammed	1:35.48
2000	Siege	4	Sylvain Guillot	Saeed bin Suroor	Hamdan bin Mohammed Al Maktoum	1:35.70
2001	China Visit	4	John Carroll	Saeed bin Suroor	Godolphin	1:36.12
2002	Skoozi	6	Wayne Smith	Allan Smith	Rashid bin Ahmed Al Mualla	1:35.99
2003	Estimraar	6	Wayne Smith	Mazin Al Kurdi	Rashid bin Mohammed	1:36.81
2004	State Shinto	8	Ryan Moore	Mazin Al Kurdi	Rashid bin Mohammed	1:37.37
2005	Grand Emporium	4	Weichong Marwing	Mike de Kock	A Geemooi	1:39.92
2006	Blatant	7	Richard Hills	Ismail Mohammed	Princess Haya of Jordan	1:36.71
2007	Imperialista	3	M Cardoso	Cosme Morgado	Estrela Energia Stables	1:35.96
2008	Happy Boy	4	Jose Aparecido da Silva	P Nickel Filho	Roberto A L Reichert	1:36:37
2009	My Indy	4	Frankie Dettori	Saeed bin Suroor	Godolphin	1:36.52
2010	Gloria de Campeao	6	Tiago Josue Pereira	Pascal Bary	Estrela Energia Stables	1:38.48
2011	Mendip	4	Frankie Dettori	Saeed bin Suroor	Hamdan bin Mohammed Al Maktoum	1:36.45
2012	Musir	5	Christophe Soumillon	Mike de Kock	Mohammed bin Khalifa Al Maktoum	1:35.85
2013	Barbecue Eddie	9	Dane O'Neill	Doug Watsom	Hamdan Al Maktoum	1:37.24
2014	Shuruq	4	Silvestre de Sousa	Saeed bin Suroor	Godolphin	1:35.84
2015	Surfer	6	Richard Mullen	Satish Seemar	Zabeel Racing International	1:38.21
2016	Le Bernardin	7	Tadhg O'Shea	Ali Rashid Al Raihe	Ahmed bin Mohammed Al Maktoum	1:37.12
2017	Le Bernardin	8	Tadhg O'Shea	Ali Rashid Al Raihe	Ahmed bin Mohammed Al Maktoum	1:36.67
2018	Heavy Metal	8	Mickael Barzalona	Salem bin Ghadayer	Hamdan bin Mohammed Al Maktoum	1:37.80
2019	North America	7	Richard Mullen	Satish Seemar	Hamdan bin Mohammed Al Maktoum	1:35.88
2020	Kimbear	6	Pat Dobbs	Doug Watson	Rashid bin Humaid Al Nuaimi	1:37.56
2021	Military Law	6	Antonio Fresu	Musabbeh Al Mheiri	Nasir Askar	1:36.42
2022	Golden Goal	8	Sam Hitchcott	Doug Watson	Dale Brennan	1:37.90
2023 (Jan)	Algiers	6	James Doyle	Simon & Ed Grisford	Hamdan Sultan Ali Alsabousi	1:35.88
2023 (Dec)	Isolate	5	Tyler Gaffalione	Doug Watson	RRR Racing	1:37.21
2024	Meshtri	4	Ben Coen	Michael Costa	Sheikh Ahmed Al Maktoum	1:36.20
2025	Imperial Emperor	5	Tadhg O'Shea	Bhupat Seemar	Deva Racing	1:37.55

== See also ==
- List of United Arab Emirates horse races
