= Mark Sestich =

Australian jockey

Personal information
- Nationality: Australian
- Born: 63–64
- Occupation: Jockey

Horse racing career
- Sport: Horse racing

Mark Sestich is a retired Australian Thoroughbred racing jockey. He is recognized as being one of the most successful jockeys in Perth during the late 1980s and early 1990s, winning four consecutive Perth jockey premierships from 1988/89 to 1991/92.

Sestich won the first two one million-dollar horse races in Western Australia, the Group 1 Australasian on Fair Sir in 1987, and the Million Dollar Thriller aboard Paklani in 1989. Sestich rode winners for some of Western Australia's most influential figures in horse racing during his career, such as Robert Holmes à Court, Laurie Connell and Sir Ernest Henry Lee-Steere. In 1994, he received a six-month suspension from racing, charged with betting on local races. Sestich was forced into an early retirement due to multiple injuries, which included a particularly bad fall during the C B Cox Stakes, in which seven riders lost their mounts. In 2022, Sestich was inducted into the WA Racing Hall of Fame.

== Notable wins ==
Some of his most notable wins include:

- WATC Derby (1982), (1989), (1992), (1997)
- WA Guineas (1982), (1990), (1993), (1999)
- Singapore Gold Cup (1986)
- The Australasian (1987)
- Karrakatta Plate (1988), (1991)
- Million Dollar Thriller (1989)
- Burswood Breeders (1989)
- Winterbottom Stakes (1989), (1990)
- Australian Derby (1991)
- Perth Cup (1991)
