= Glória de Campeão =

Brazilian-bred Thoroughbred racehorse

- Sire: Impression
- Grandsire: Rubiano
- Dam: Audacity
- Damsire: Clackson
- Sex: Stallion
- Foaled: 29 September 2003
- Country: Brazil
- Colour: Bay
- Breeder: Haras Santarem (http://www.harassantarem.com.br/)
- Owner: Stefan Friborg
- Trainer: Pascal F. Bary
- Record: 25: 9-6-3
- Earnings: $9,258,355

Major wins
- Grande Premio Gervasio Seabra (2007); Singapore Airlines International Cup (2009); Al Maktoum Challenge, Round 1 (2010); Dubai World Cup (2010)

Glória de Campeão (foaled September 29, 2003) is a retired Brazilian Thoroughbred racehorse that is best known for his victory in the 2010 Dubai World Cup. He ran on 4 continents (South America, North America, Europe, Asia) and won in Brazil, the UAE, and Singapore.

== Background ==
Glória de Campeão was a bay racehorse bred in Haras Santarem in Paraná. His sire was the Argentinian Grade 1 winner Impression. His dam was Audacity out of Clackson, a horse considered one of the best dam sires born in Brazil. He was named Glória de Campeão which in Portuguese roughly means "Glory of the Champion."

== Racing career ==
=== Brazil ===
Glória de Campeão's first two years on the track were nearly all contested at racetracks in Brazil. He ran in maiden and condition races for his first four starts, winning two of them. His first success in stakes company came in his fifth start, the Group 3 Grande Prêmio Presidente Antonio T. Assumpção Netto. In it he went to the lead alongside Don Lopes with a clear drop back to the nearest horse after them. Don Lopes stayed in contention with Glória de Campeão in second but he drifted to the far outside rail costing him valuable ground as Glória de Campeão stayed on the rail and won the day. More stakes success followed as he attempted Group 1 company twice. Both times he could only settle for third place. But he added another grade stakes to his resume in the Group 2 Grande Prêmio Gervasio Seabra, giving him further success as a racehorse. A third in his second Group 1 attempt would be his last start in Brazil as after that he took on the world.

=== Later career ===
At the end of his four-year-old season, he headed out of Brazil and ran at Longchamp for his first out-of-country appearance. There he was trained by Pascal Bary instead of his usual trainer Stefan Frieberg. His debut was a lukewarm sixth in the Prix Daniel Wildenstein Castel Marie-Louise de la Baule. He spent the rest of his racing career traveling around. In his five-year-old season, he was unsuccessful internationally. He failed to win in six starts including an eighth-place finish in the Dubai World Cup behind Curlin and Well Armed. although he managed three second-place finishes including in the Grade 3 Sheikh Maktoum bin Rashid Al Maktoum Challenge-Round 1. The following year he made headway when he won a handicap at Nad Al Sheba before being a distantly beat second in the Dubai World Cup behind Well Armed. His success only reached further a start later when he went back to turf in the Grade 1 Singapore Airlines International Cup. He would go to the lead as usual with Jay Peg on the rail to challenge upfront for most of it. But he began to pull away in the home stretch leading over Pompeii Ruler by about three-fourths of a length. He then pulled away to open two full-lengths. With the late closing favorite Precipice giving one last challenge but he just missed by a head giving Glória de Campeão his first career Grade 1 victory. The final time of 1:59.20 was a new track record.

He only ran one more time that year with a bad showing in the Arlington Million but as a Seven-Year-Old, he had his most eventful yet brief season of racing. His first start back was a third run in the Al Maktoum Challenge Round 1. Unlike his other wins, he stayed close to the lead rather than on the lead. He would stay behind Midshipman who would lead on the outside for most of the race. But Glória de Campeão snuck up on the rail and pulled away. Forgotten Voice gave a late final bid but it was too late Glória de Campeão had won. He had lesser success in his next two starts leading up the race but in the Al Maktoum Challenge Round 3 he struck a rivalry with Lizard's Desire who finished fifth while Glória de Campeão finished second. A start later they faced off on the biggest stage in the Dubai World Cup which for the first time was being run at Meydan Racecourse. This time it was a battle with Glória de Campeão leading most of the way and Lizard's Desire flying late to hit the wire at nearly the same time with Glória de Campeão. At the time Lizard's Desire's jockey had thought he won. But under later examination, Glória de Campeão was given the win by the closest margin possible a nose.

A start after his narrow win in the Dubai World Cup he faced off against Lizard's Desire in the Singapore International Cup. This time it went in favor of Lizard's Desire who had more time in the stretch to wear down Glória de Campeão and get up by half a length. Unbeknownst to both, it would be their final races. Glória de Campeão aimed for the Cox Plate as his next start but he came up with a tear in his left front tendon in a workout.

== Race record ==
| Date | Age | Distance | Surface | Race | Grade | Track | Odds | Field | Finish | Time | Winning (Losing) margin | Jockey | Ref |
|---|---|---|---|---|---|---|---|---|---|---|---|---|---|
| Nov 26, 2006 | 3 | 1200 m | Dirt | Prêmio Estrada Uniao Industria | COND | Gávea | | 6 | 1 | 1:12.3 | | M. Cardoso | |
| Dec 23, 2006 | 3 | 1400 m | Turf | Prêmio Santa Claus | COND | Gávea | | 12 | 4 | 1:24.9 | | I. Correa | |
| Jan 22, 2007 | 3 | 1400 m | Dirt | Prêmio Vila Isabel | COND | Gávea | | 13 | 1 | 1:26.8 | 4 lengths | M. Mazini | |
| Mar 18, 2007 | 3 | 1600 m | Dirt | Prêmio Thumb | COND | Cidade Jardim | | 8 | 1 | 1:33.96 | 7 lengths | A. Domingos | |
| Apr 22, 2007 | 3 | 1600 m | Turf | Grande Prêmio Presidente Antonio T. Assumpção Netto | III | Cidade Jardim | 4.60 | 12 | 1 | 1:38.91 | 1 length | J. Aparecido | |
| May 20, 2007 | 3 | 1600 m | Turf | Grande Prêmio Presidente da República | I | Cidade Jardim | 2.70* | 9 | 3 | 1:37.67 | Head | J. Aparecido | |
| Jul 7, 2007 | 4 | 1600 m | Turf | Grande Prêmio Gervasio Seabra | II | Gávea | | 10 | 1 | 1:34.5 | 3/4 lengths | M. Mazini | |
| Aug 19, 2007 | 4 | 1600 m | Turf | Grande Prêmio Presidente da República | I | Gávea | | 15 | 3 | 1:32.9 | 1 3/4 lengths | M. Mazini | |
| Oct 6, 2007 | 4 | 1600 m | Turf | Prix Daniel Wildenstein Castel Maire-Louise de la Baule | II | Longchamp | 3.00 | 11 | 6 | 1:40.90 | (9 lengths) | Ioritz Mendizabal | |
| Jan 17, 2008 | 4 | 1600 m | Dirt | Al Maktoum Challenge Round 1 | III | Nad Al Sheba | NA | 16 | 2 | 1:36.37 | | Christophe Lemaire | |
| Feb 21, 2008 | 4 | 2000 m | Dirt | Handicap | HCP | Nad Al Sheba | NA | 16 | 2 | 2:01.81 | | Christophe Lemaire | |
| Mar 6, 2008 | 4 | 2000 m | Dirt | Al Maktoum Challenge Round 3 | II | Nad Al Sheba | NA | 12 | 2 | 2:00.35 | | Christophe Lemaire | |
| Mar 29, 2008 | 4 | 2000 m | Dirt | Dubai World Cup | I | Nad Al Sheba | NA | 12 | 8 | 2:00.15 | (16 1/4 lengths) | Christophe Lemaire | |
| Aug 16, 2008 | 5 | 1900 m | Dirt | Allowance | ALW | Deauville | | 16 | 3 | 2:00.3 | | Ioritz Mendizabal | |
| Oct 4, 2008 | 5 | 1950 m | Turf | Prix Dollar | II | Longchamp | | 8 | 8 | 2:03.5 | | Christophe Lemaire | |
| Jan 15, 2009 | 5 | 1600 m | Dirt | Al Maktoum Challenge Round 1 | III | Nad Al Sheba | NA | 12 | 5 | 1:36.52 | | Christophe Lemaire | |
| Feb 5, 2009 | 5 | 1800 m | Dirt | Al Maktoum Challenge Round 2 | III | Nad Al Sheba | NA | 9 | 4 | 1:50.53 | | Jorge Leme | |
| Feb 26, 2009 | 5 | 1800 m | Dirt | Handicap | HCP | Nad Al Sheba | NA | 16 | 1 | 1:49.53 | | Jorge Leme | |
| Mar 28, 2009 | 5 | 2000 m | Dirt | Dubai World Cup | I | Nad Al Sheba | NA | 14 | 2 | 2:01.01 | (14 lengths) | Jorge Leme | |
| May 17, 2009 | 5 | 2000 m | Turf | Singapore Airlines International Cup | I | Kranji Racecourse | | 12 | 1 | 1:59.20 | 1/4 lengths | Tiago Pereira | |
| Aug 8, 2009 | 6 | 1 1/4 miles | Turf | Arlington Million Stakes | I | Arlington Park | 11.30 | 8 | 7 | 2:04.19 | (9 3/4 lengths) | Tiago Pereira | |
| Jan 28, 2010 | 6 | 1600 m | Synthetic | Al Maktoum Challenge Round 1 | III | Meydan | NA | 14 | 1 | 1:38.48 | | Tiago Pereira | |
| Mar 4, 2010 | 6 | 2000 m | Synthetic | Al Maktoum Challenge Round 3 | II | Meydan | NA | 14 | 2 | 2:02.62 | (1/4 lengths) | Tiago Pereira | |
| Mar 27, 2010 | 6 | 2000 m | Synthetic | Dubai World Cup | I | Meydan | NA | 14 | 1 | 2:03.83 | Nose | Tiago Pereira | |
| May 16, 2010 | 6 | 2000 m | Turf | Singapore Airlines International Cup | I | Kranji Racecourse | | | 2 | 2:02.12 | (1/2 lengths) | Bruno Reis | |

== Retirement and stud career ==
Following this unexpected end to his career his trainer, Stefan Frieberg went on record after the decision and said "We probably could have raced him again, but why risk maybe destroying him?" Friborg said. "He is a great horse and he deserves his retirement. If he hadn't been injured he would of course have come back to Dubai to try and win the World Cup again." Glória de Campeão was then sent back to Brazil to stand at stud and even today has remained the all-time highest money earner for any South American bred at $9,258,355, surpassing the previous leader Invasor who earned $7,804,070 and like Glória de Campeão had won the Dubai World Cup.

Glória de Campeão was entered stud in Sweden, standing at Aleback Stud for one year. He then returned to Brazil, standing stud at Haras Estrela Energia in Paraná.

=== Notable offspring ===
- Mestre do Iguassu, winner of the Group 1 Grande Prêmio Ipiranga and Group 1 Grande Prêmio Jockey Club de São Paulo
- Ushuaia Ibiza, winner of the Group 1 Grande Prêmio Presidente da República
