= Pourparler (horse) =

Irish-bred Thoroughbred racehorse

- Sire: Hugh Lupus
- Grandsire: Djebel
- Dam: Review
- Damsire: Panorama
- Sex: Mare
- Foaled: 8 May 1961
- Country: Ireland
- Colour: Bay
- Breeder: Peter FitzGerald
- Owner: Beatrice, Lady Granard
- Trainer: Paddy Prendergast
- Record: 10: 3-1-2
- Earnings: £38,354

Major wins
- National Stakes (1963); Lowther Stakes (1963); 1000 Guineas (1964)

Awards
- Top-rated Irish two-year-old filly (1963); Timeform rating 121

Pourparler (1961 – after 1983) was an Irish Thoroughbred racehorse and broodmare who won the classic 1000 Guineas in 1964. In a racing career lasting from the spring of 1963 until July 1964, the filly ran ten times and won three races. As a two-year-old, Pourparler won two important races in England and finished third in the Prix Robert Papin in France. In the following spring, she was beaten in her first two races before winning the 1000 Guineas at Newmarket. She was beaten in her two subsequent races before being retired to stud, where she had limited success as a broodmare.

== Background ==
Pourparler was a bay mare bred in County Limerick, Ireland, by Peter FitzGerald. She was sired by Hugh Lupus, a French-bred stallion who won the Champion Stakes in 1956. Hugh Lupus, who was inbred 2x3 to the stallion Tourbillon, suffered from low fertility at stud but sired several other good horses including the St. Leger winner Hethersett. Pourparler's dam, Review, won only two minor races but was an outstanding broodmare: her other progeny included Fleet (1000 Guineas), Democratie (Prix de la Forêt) and Display (Cheveley Park Stakes, Coronation Stakes).

As a yearling, Pourparler was sold to Beatrice, Lady Granard, and sent into training with Paddy Prendergast at his stable at the Curragh in County Kildare.

== Racing career ==
=== 1963: two-year-old season ===
Pourparler ran five times as a two-year-old and won twice. In May, having been beaten in her first two races, she was sent to England for the National Stakes over five furlongs at Sandown Park. She won from Derring-Do, a colt who went on to win several important races including the Queen Elizabeth II Stakes. In July Pourparler travelled to France for the Prix Robert Papin at Maisons-Laffitte Racecourse. She finished third behind the French colts Djel and Yours. In August Prendergast sent the filly back to England for the Lowther Stakes at York. Ridden by the Australian jockey Garnet Bougoure, she won at odds of 7/2 from the English fillies Flattering and Gwen.

In the Free Handicap, a rating of the season's best British and Irish two-year-olds, Pourparler was given a rating of 125 pounds, eight pounds below the top-rated colt Talahasse and three behind the leading filly Mesopotamia.

=== 1964: three-year-old season ===
Pourparler began her three-year-old season at Baldoyle on 17 March, when she finished fourth in the Spring Plate over seven furlongs. She was then sent to England, where she started favourite for the 1000 Guineas Trial Stakes at Kempton Park Racecourse but finished second, beaten by three quarters of a length by Gwen. At Newmarket Racecourse, Pourparler started at odds of 11/2 for the 1000 Guineas in a field of eighteen fillies, with Gwen being made the 9/10 favourite. Ridden by Bougoure, she won by a length from Gwen with Petite Gina and Royal Danseuse dead-heating for third place. Her win was the first for an Irish-trained horse in the 1000 Guineas for more than 50 years, and was one of a series of wins by foreign horses in major races which led to the 1964 season being described as a particularly depressing one for British racing.

Pourparler did not run in The Oaks, and made her next appearance in the Coronation Stakes at Royal Ascot, for which she was made odds-on favourite. She finished third of the six runners behind Ocean, a filly who was carrying seven pounds less than the Guineas winner. On her final appearance, Pourparler was matched against colts and older horses in the Sussex Stakes at Goodwood in July, and finished unplaced behind Roan Rocket.

== Retirement ==
Pourparler was retired to stud in Ireland, where she produced several minor winners, but nothing of top class.

== Assessment and honours ==
The independent Timeform organisation gave Pourparler a rating of 121 in 1964, fifteen pound below their top-rated horse Relko.

In their book A Century of Champions, based on the Timeform rating system, John Randall and Tony Morris rated Pourparler an "inferior" winner of the 1000 Guineas.

== Pedigree ==
Pedigree of Pourparler (IRE), bay mare, 1961
Sire Hugh Lupus (FR) 1952	Djebel; 1937	Tourbillon	Ksar
Sire Hugh Lupus (FR) 1952	Djebel; 1937	Tourbillon	Durban
Sire Hugh Lupus (FR) 1952	Djebel; 1937	Loika	Gay Crusader
Sire Hugh Lupus (FR) 1952	Djebel; 1937	Loika	Coeur a Coeur
Sire Hugh Lupus (FR) 1952	Sakountala; 1942	Goya	Tourbillon
Sire Hugh Lupus (FR) 1952	Sakountala; 1942	Goya	Zariba
Sire Hugh Lupus (FR) 1952	Sakountala; 1942	Samos	Bruleur
Sire Hugh Lupus (FR) 1952	Sakountala; 1942	Samos	Samya
Dam Review (GB) 1951	Panorama; 1936	Sir Cosmo	The Boss
Dam Review (GB) 1951	Panorama; 1936	Sir Cosmo	Ayn Hali
Dam Review (GB) 1951	Panorama; 1936	Happy Climax	Happy Warrior
Dam Review (GB) 1951	Panorama; 1936	Happy Climax	Clio
Dam Review (GB) 1951	Pin Up Girl; 1943	Coup de Lyon	Winalot
Dam Review (GB) 1951	Pin Up Girl; 1943	Coup de Lyon	Sundry
Dam Review (GB) 1951	Pin Up Girl; 1943	Careless	Caerleon
Dam Review (GB) 1951	Pin Up Girl; 1943	Careless	Traverse (Family:4-p)
