= Romanian Derby =

The Romanian Derby (Romanian: Derby-ul Român) is a horse race run annually in Ploiești, Romania, over a distance of 2,400 metres, open to three-year-old thoroughbred colts and fillies. Generally, a derby (named after the Derby Stakes, inaugurated in 1780) is considered to be the most important kind of horse race.

== History ==
The derby was established in 1875 by the Romanian Jockey Club. The first Romanian Derby was run in July 1875 in Bucharest over a distance of 2,000 metres and was won by the filly Gizelda, owned by Alexandru Balș. Between 1875 and 1885, the Derby was run over a distance of 2,000 meters, between 1886 and 1895 over a distance of 2,200 metres, and starting with 1896 over the established distance of 2,400 metres. The Derby was run on a Sunday, in June, at the end of May or at the beginning of July, being a highly anticipated event, gathering occasionally over 20,000 spectators.

The last derby of this classical series was run in 1960, the competition being discontinued afterwards as the last standing section of the Băneasa Hippodrome, where the derby was run, was demolished that year to make way for the Romexpo building.

Between 1961 and 2023, the Derby was run only one time, namely in August 2000, at the Mangalia Hippodrome, over a distance of 2,000 metres, the winner of the race being the filly Datina.

Starting in 2024 (after a failed attempt in 2023), the Derby is run annually at the Ploiești Hippodrome.

=== Notable owners, jockeys and horses ===
The owner who won the most races was Alexandru Marghiloman, known as the father of Romanian equestrianism. He won 25 races during his lifetime, and after his death (10 May 1925), a horse who was born shortly before his demise won the race in 1928. Alexandru Marghiloman also owned the best Romanian race horse in history, Zori de Zi, who won the Romanian Derby in 1913 and also won almost every race in which he ran.

Notable jockeys include Aristide Cucu, Nicolae Ilinca, Vasile Huțuleag, Mihai Câmpeanu, Ștefan Botescu, Gogu Stoian. Notable horse trainers include Ion Pinka, Ion Gheorghe, Ștefan Ujvary, Nicolae Verone, Titi Cornea, Gheorghe Enescu.

The first dead heat of the Romanian Derby took place in 1934, the winner being selected by voting. Three out of five determined the winner to be Toiag, belonging to General Moruzzi.

Of the 82 classical races, 64 were won by colts and 18 by fillies (the first and last race were won by fillies).

== Winning horses ==
- 1875: Gizelda
- 1876: Cora
- 1877-8: no races
- 1879: Roland II
- 1880: Vesta
- 1881: Mars II
- 1882: Monarque
- 1883: Meteor
- 1884: Ouragan
- 1885: Prim
- 1886: Lord Byron
- 1887: Vijelia
- 1888: La Gondola
- 1889: Loteria
- 1890: Cartuș
- 1891: Saint-Cyrien
- 1892: Saint-Cyrien (won twice)
- 1893: Partisan
- 1894: Darling
- 1895: Oltu
- 1896: Paradox
- 1897: Pajera
- 1898: Eole
- 1899: Melinigue
- 1900: Ardeal
- 1901: Argeș
- 1902: Cobzar
- 1903: Esquil
- 1904: Mărășești
- 1905: Stanca
- 1906: Tina
- 1907: Val Vârtej
- 1908: Whig
- 1909: La Caterina
- 1910: Vifor
- 1911: Freamăt
- 1912: Whisky
- 1913: Zori de Zi
- 1914: Fleac
- 1915: Frasin
- 1916: Dristor
- 1917-8: no races
- 1919: Fluieraș
- 1920: Roșcova
- 1921: Flașneta
- 1922: Ghici?
- 1923: Taifun
- 1924: Lefter
- 1925: Lulli
- 1926: Banu Mărăcine
- 1927: Maltezi II
- 1928: Ghiaur
- 1929: Satrap
- 1930: Coquin
- 1931: Bar Le Duc
- 1932: Leu
- 1933: Scârbă Mică
- 1934: Toiag
- 1935: Pipico
- 1936: Gorgos
- 1937: Bastard
- 1938: Oștean
- 1939: Halmei
- 1940: S.O.S.
- 1941: Boer Bibi
- 1942: Foișor
- 1943: Burgund
- 1944: Golf
- 1945: Motan
- 1946: Mosquito
- 1947: Fantastic
- 1948: Mușchetar
- 1949: Poezia
- 1950: Epigon
- 1951: Commandor
- 1952: Matador
- 1953: Sorin II
- 1954: Mac II
- 1955: Petrică
- 1956: Capra
- 1957: Pușa
- 1958: Gal
- 1959: Pardubice
- 1960: Palmira
- 1961-99: no races
- 2000: Datina
- 2001-23: no races
- 2024: Easy Sea
- 2025: Hand of Eva
- 2026: Lola Go

== Bibliography ==
- Alexandru Grigorescu, Cândva la Băneasa. Ed. Vremea, 2008. ISBN 9736452999.
- Alexandru Grigorescu, Odinioară la Băneasa. Ed. Mediana, 1996. ISBN 9739761909.
