= Kranji =

- Subzone of Sungei Kadut Planning Area

Name transcription(s)
  - Chinese: 克兰芝
  - Pinyin: Kèlánzhī
  - Malay: Keranji
  - Tamil: கிராஞ்சி
- Location of Kranji within Singapore
- Coordinates: 1°25′22.08″N 103°45′1.44″E
- Country: Singapore

Kranji is a suburb in northwestern Singapore, bounded by Sungei Kadut to the north, Turf Club to the east, as well as Lim Chu Kang and the Western Water Catchment to the west.

It is located about 22 kilometres (14 mi) from the city centre and its name came from the Malay word "Buah Keranji" due to pronunciation by local Malay, it became "Kranji".

== Etymology ==
The city of Kranji is named after a local tree, pokok kranji or keranji (Malay for Dialium indum, velvet tamarind tree).

== History ==
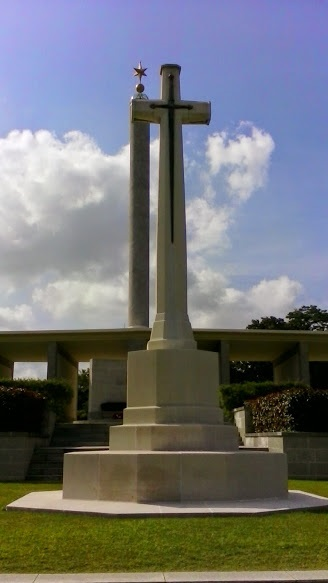
Kranji War Cross

Kranji served as a military camp before the Japanese invasion of Singapore in 1942. During World War II, the Battle of Kranji was the second stage of the Empire of Japan's plan for the invasion of Singapore. It is now the site of the Kranji War Cemetery and Kranji War Memorial, commemorating the 30,000 Commonwealth personnel who died in Singapore, Malaya, Java and Sumatra during World War II.

Kranji is currently a prime residential area comprising mostly stand-alone properties. There are no towering apartment blocks, unlike most suburbs of Singapore. Along Kranji Road, it is also an industrial area.

On 4 March 2000, the Singapore Turf Club (STC) opened Kranji Racecourse, replacing the Bukit Timah Race Course. The racecourse is located next to the Kranji MRT station.

On 5 June 2023, it was announced that the STC will cease operations in March 2027 due to demand of land for housing and other projects.

STC held its last race at the Kranji racecourse on Oct 5, 2024, and the club was expected to return the site to the Government by March 2027.

The government has since taken back the land, and it was earlier announced that the site will be redeveloped into a new housing estate, with around 14,000 new public and private homes.

== Notable places ==
- Kranji Reservoir which was formed by the damming of the Kranji River.

== Transportation ==
In 1903, the Singapore-Kranji Railway was launched with four stations, running from Tank Road to Kranji.

It is connected to Kranji MRT station and is one of the main boarding and alighting stops to and from Johor Bahru for Bus Service 160 and 170/X.
