= What A Nuisance =

New Zealand-bred Thoroughbred racehorse

- Sire: St Puckle
- Grandsire: St. Paddy
- Dam: Fashion Bell
- Damsire: Delmura
- Sex: Gelding
- Foaled: 1978
- Country: New Zealand
- Colour: Bay
- Owner: Lloyd & Suzy Williams, Dennis Gowing
- Trainer: John Meagher
- Record: 57: 10–7–9

Major wins
- AJC Chairman's Handicap (1984); Melbourne Cup (1985)

What A Nuisance (1978–2005) was a New Zealand-bred Thoroughbred racehorse. He was best known for winning the 1985 Melbourne Cup at Flemington Racecourse in November 1985.

== Background ==
What A Nuisance was a bay horse with a white sock on his right hind foot bred in New Zealand by. He was sired by St Puckle, a British-bred son of the 1960 Epsom Derby winner St. Paddy. His dam, Fashion Bell was a descendant of The Witch, a British mare who was exported to Australia in the late 19th century, becoming the grand-dam of the 1902 Melbourne Cup winner The Victory.

== Racing career ==
In early 1984 What A Nuisance, trained by Ken Rogerson won four consecutive races and was made favourite for the Sydney Cup in April despite being treated for a leg injury on the eve of the race. The gelding finished sixth in the race, aggravating the injury. What A Nuisance had recently been one of a group of fifteen horses bought from Rogerson's stable by the businessman Lloyd Williams who, along with Dennis Gowing, co-owned the gelding for the remainder of the horse's racing career. Williams had previously owned the 1981 Melbourne Cup winner Just A Dash. Attempts to bring What A Nuisance back in the spring failed, as he developed problems with his suspensory ligaments and was kept off the racecourse for a further nine months. He was then sent to be trained by John Meagher.

In the winter of 1985, What a Nuisance returned to racing at Bendigo where he ran five times, winning once. He then finished second to Black Knight at Moonee Valley Racecourse in September and then finished sixth in the Group 1 Caulfield Stakes. He completed his Cup preparation by running fourth in the Moonee Valley Cup and fifth in the Mackinnon Stakes.

At Flemington Racecourse on 5 November What A Nuisance started at odds of 15/1 in a field of twenty-three runners for the Melbourne Cup. The race was sponsored for the first time by the Foster's Group and carried record prize-money of over A$1,000,000, making it the most valuable race ever run in Australia. The race attracted a crowd of 79,126 which included the Prince and Princess of Wales. Ridden by the veteran Pat Hyland, What A Nuisance was drawn badly but appeared well-suited by the wet conditions. Hyland allowed the gelding to relax in the early stages before producing a strong late run to win by a nose from the mare Koiro Corrie May.

== Retirement ==
What A Nuisance was retired to Hyland's property at Clyde, near Cranbourne, Victoria. He died suddenly on 19 April 2005 at the age of 26. An emotional Hyland described him as "a truly honest and game racehorse".

== Pedigree ==
Pedigree of What A Nuisance (NZ), bay gelding, 1978
Sire St Puckle (GB) 1967	St. Paddy (GB); 1957	Aureole*	Hyperion*
Sire St Puckle (GB) 1967	St. Paddy (GB); 1957	Aureole*	Angelola*
Sire St Puckle (GB) 1967	St. Paddy (GB); 1957	Edie Kelly	Bois Roussel
Sire St Puckle (GB) 1967	St. Paddy (GB); 1957	Edie Kelly	Caerlissa
Sire St Puckle (GB) 1967	Browband (IRE); 1953	Royal Charger	Nearco*
Sire St Puckle (GB) 1967	Browband (IRE); 1953	Royal Charger	Sun Princess
Sire St Puckle (GB) 1967	Browband (IRE); 1953	Riband	Hyperion*
Sire St Puckle (GB) 1967	Browband (IRE); 1953	Riband	Ribbon
Dam Fashion Bell (NZ) 1962	Belmura (GB); 1963	Mossborough	Nearco*
Dam Fashion Bell (NZ) 1962	Belmura (GB); 1963	Mossborough	All Moonshine
Dam Fashion Bell (NZ) 1962	Belmura (GB); 1963	Chikita	Chateauroux
Dam Fashion Bell (NZ) 1962	Belmura (GB); 1963	Chikita	Rikokita
Dam Fashion Bell (NZ) 1962	Amber Lyn (NZ); 1964	St Ambrose	Aureole*
Dam Fashion Bell (NZ) 1962	Amber Lyn (NZ); 1964	St Ambrose	Church Music
Dam Fashion Bell (NZ) 1962	Amber Lyn (NZ); 1964	Lady Judge	Probation
Dam Fashion Bell (NZ) 1962	Amber Lyn (NZ); 1964	Lady Judge	Fleet Wind (Family: 1-o)

* What A Nuisance is inbred 3S x 4D to the stallion Aureole, meaning that he appears third generation on the sire side of his pedigree, and fourth generation on the dam side of his pedigree.

* What A Nuisance is inbred 4S x 4S x 5D to the stallion Hyperion, meaning that he appears fourth twice generation on the sire side of his pedigree, and fifth generation once (via Aureole) on the dam side of his pedigree.

* What A Nuisance is inbred 4S x 4D to the stallion Nearco, meaning that he appears fourth generation on the sire side of his pedigree, and fourth generation on the dam side of his pedigree.

== Namesake ==
Australian rail operator CFCL Australia named locomotive FL220 after the horse.
