= T. J. Pereira =

Brazilian jockey

Tiago Pereira
Personal information
- Born: November 29, 1976 (age 49) Sapucaia do Sul, Brazil
- Occupation: Jockey

Horse racing career
- Sport: Horse racing
- Career wins: 1,750+ (ongoing)

Major racing wins
- Singapore Airlines International Cup (2009); Maktoum Challenge - R1 (2010); Dubai World Cup (2010); Speakeasy Stakes (2018); Charles Whittingham Stakes (2019); San Simeon Stakes (2019)

Significant horses
- Glória de Campeão

Tiago Josué Pereira (born 29 November 1976) is a Brazilian jockey who competes in the sport of Thoroughbred horse racing. He entered professional racing as an apprentice in 1994, winning 96 races at Brazil's Cristal Racecourse in his first year. Since then he has competed at various racetracks around the world, including Dubai, France, and Singapore, and the United States, and has won more than 1,750 races.

On March 27, 2010, Pereira won the richest and most important race of his career aboard Glória de Campeão when he captured the US$10 million Dubai World Cup at Meydan Racecourse.
