= Singapore Airlines International Cup =

Horse race in Singapore

The Singapore Airlines International Cup was a Group 1 flat horse race in Singapore open to thoroughbreds aged three years or older. It was run at Kranji over a distance of 2,000 metres (about 1¼ miles), in May each year. It was discontinued from 2016.

It was established as an international event at the newly opened Kranji Racecourse in 2000. This was after the Singapore Derby had lost its international status, and was restricted to domestic horses only. The event was sponsored by Singapore Airlines since its inception, and it attained Group 1 status in 2002.

The last Cup race was run in 2015 and was discontinued thereafter.

In 2024 horse racing in Singapore was ceased.

== Winners ==
Year	Winner (Country)	Age	Jockey	Trainer	Owner	Time
2000	Ouzo (SIN)	7	Saimee Jumaat	Malcolm Thwaites	Eres Tu No. 2 Stable	2:03.4
2001	Endless Hall (ENG)	5	Jamie Spencer	Luca Cumani	Il Paralupo Syndicate	2:00.8
2002	Grandera (UAE)	4	Frankie Dettori	Saeed bin Suroor	Godolphin	2:01.3
2003	no race ^{[1]}
2004	Epalo (GER)	5	Andrasch Starke	Andreas Schütz	Gary A. Tanaka	2:02.6
2005	Mummify (AUS)	6	Danny Nikolic	Lee Freedman	Mark Pejic et al.	2:05.0
2006	Cosmo Bulk (JPN)	5	Fuyuki Igarashi	Kazunori Tabe	Misako Okada	2:06.5
2007	Shadow Gate (JPN)	5	Katsuharu Tanaka	Yukihiro Kato	Tomokazu Iizuka	2:04.0
2008	Jay Peg (SAF)	5	Anton Marcus	Herman Brown	Marsh Shirtliff et al.	2:00.9
2009	Glória de Campeão (BRA)	6	T. J. Pereira	Pascal Bary	Stefan Friborg	1:59.2
2010	Lizards Desire (SAF)	4	Kevin Shea	Mike de Kock	Mohammed bin Khalifa Al Maktoum	2.02.12
2011	Gitano Hernando (SAF)	6	Grey Schofield	Herman Brown	Ramzan Kadyrov	2.03.93
2012	Chinchon (FRA)	7	Olivier Doleuze	Carlos Laffon-Parias	Sarl Darpat France	2:04.43
2013	Military Attack (HKG)	5	Zac Purton	John Moore	Steven Lo Kit Sing & Canny Leung	1:59.58
2014	Dan Excel (HKG)	6	Tommy Berry	John Moore	David Philip Boehm	1:59.07
2015	Dan Excel (HKG)	7	Tommy Berry	John Moore	David Philip Boehm	2:01.52

^{1} The 2003 running was cancelled due to the SARS outbreak in Asia.
