= Singapore Derby =

- Class: Group 1
- Location: Singapore Turf Club; Singapore
- Inaugurated: 1880
- Race type: Thoroughbred - Flat racing
- Website: Singapore Turf Club

Race information
- Distance: 1800 metres (9 furlongs)
- Surface: Turf
- Track: Left-handed
- Qualification: Four-year-olds
- Weight: Colts & Geldings 57 kg. Fillies 55.5 kg.
- Purse: S$400,000

The Singapore Derby was a thoroughbred horse race held annually in mid-July at the Singapore Turf Club. Contested on turf over a left-handed course, the domestic Group 1 race was run over a 1,800-metre (9 furlongs) distance and open to four-year-old horses only.

Inaugurated in 1880 at the Serangoon Road Race Course at Farrer Park, it was raced there until 1910 at which time it was cancelled. The Singapore Derby was revived in 1959 under the auspices of the Singapore Turf Club and hosted by the Bukit Timah Race Course through 1999 when the track was closed to be replaced by the new Singapore Turf Club.

Since 1959 the race has been contested at various distances:

- 2,414 metres : 1959-1965, 1968, 1970–1975
- 2,425 metres: 1966
- 2,011 metres: 1967, 1969
- 2,400 metres (about): 1976
- 2,400 metres: 1977-1997
- 2,000 metres (about): 1998
- 2,000 metres: 1999-2017
- 1,800 metres: 2018 to 2024

At the time the race was modified to a distance of 2,000 metres in 1998. The conditions were also changed, making it open to four-year-old domestic horses only.

The 2024 edition was the last held upon cessation of horse racing in Singapore.

== Records ==
Speed record: (at a distance of 1800 metres)

- 1:46.34 - Jupiter Gold (2018)

Most wins:

- 2 - November Sun (1968, 1969)
- 2 - Feu vert (1985, 1986)
- 2 - Courtline Jester (1995, 1996)

Most wins by an owner:

- 5 - Auric Stable (1970, 1975, 1990, 1995, 1996)

Most wins by a jockey:

- 3 - Johnny L. Wilson (1963, 1972, 1975)

Most wins by a trainer:

- 9 - Ivan Allan (1972, 1974, 1976, 1979, 1980, 1981, 1983, 1985, 1986)

== Winners ==
Past winners of the Singapore Derby are

Year	Winner	Jockey	Trainer	Owner	Time
2024	Lim's Saltoro	Marc Lerner	Daniel Francis Meagher	Lim's Stable	1:47.36
2023	Golden Monkey	Hugh Bowman	Tim Fitzsimmons		1:47.92
2022	Lim's Kosciuszko	Daniel Robert Beasley	Daniel Francis Meagher	Lim's Stable	1:49:15
2021	Hard Too Think	Marc Robert Lerner	Stephen Gray	Stephen Gray Racing Stable	1:48.27
2020	Top Knight	Vladimir Duric	Michael John Clements	Falcon Racing No 7 Stable	1:48.79
2019	Sun Marshal	Joseph Ryan Azzopardi	Lee Freedman	Sun Bloodstock Racing Stable	1:49.10
2018	Jupiter Gold	Olivier Denis Placais	Hideyuki Takaoka	Jupiter Gold Stable	1:46.34
2017	Infantry	Manoel Nunes Da Silva	Tan Hai Wang (Alwin)	Kajorn Petch Racing No 2 Stable	2:02.29
2016	Well Done	Michael Rodd	David Kok Teik Wai	Well Done Stable	2:03.00
2015	Quechua	Corey Brown	Patrick Bernard Shaw	Avengers Stable	2:03.14
2014	Spalato	Manoel Nunes Da Silva	O’Hara John Fitzgerald Ceineidi	Graham Christopher Mackie	2:02.40
2013	Better Life	Alan Keith Munro	Hideyuki Takaoka	Suzuka Racing Stable	2:01.20
2012	Chase Me	Joao Henrique Almansa Moreira	Koh Chor Yung Desmond	Super Trio Stable	2:04.60
2011	Clint	John Powell	Cliff Brown	Oscar Racing Stable	2:02.60
2010	Race Ahead	Opie Bosson	Bruce Marsh	Race Ahead Stable	2:02.16
2009	Jolie's Shinju	Ronnie Stewart	Hideyuki Takaoka	Hippocrates Stable	2:00.2
2008	Top Spin	Noel Callow	Laurie Laxon	Lim's Stable	2:02.2
2007	Lim's Prestige	Din Azis	Stephen Gray	Lim's Stable	2:03.3
2006	Our Falstaff †	Robbie Fradd	Patrick Shaw	Kantor & Nestadt Stable	2:07.5
2005	Hello and Goodbye	John Powell	Bruce Marsh	Naga Mas Stable	2:10.2
2004	Dreyfuss	Shane Dye	Laurie Laxon	Oscar Racing Stable	2:08.2
2003	Lead to Victory	Larry Cassidy	Charlie Read	Our Stable	2:05.7
2002	Smart Bet	Larry Cassidy	Mohd Yusof	Smart Bet Stable	2:04.0
2001	Bocelli	Grant Cooksley	Patrick Busuttin	Fairdeal Stable et al.	2:02.8
2000	All The Way	Darryll Holland	Saeed bin Suroor	Godolphin Racing	2:03.2
1999	Par Excellence	Saimee Jumaat	Malcolm Thwaites	Fairdeal Stable	2:01.1
1998	Ouzo	Saimee Jumaat	Malcolm Thwaites	Eres Tu No. 2 Stable	2:13.3
1997	Peak Of Perfection XI	Ismadi Ismail	Malcolm Thwaites	Lucky Stable	2:29.3
1996	Courtline Jester	Oo Khuang Liang	Henry Tan	Auric Stable	2:28.4
1995	Courtline Jester	M. S. Suhaimi	Teh Choon Beng	Auric Stable	2:29.7
1994	Noble Spirits	Oscar Chavez	Mohd Yusof	Goh & Goh Stable	2:35.2
1993	Lee's Bid	S. Y. Leong	Yashaiya Bin Ahmad	Nikko Stable	2:37.0
1992	Peak Of Perfection X	Ronald Woodworth	Malcolm Thwaites	Lucky Stable	2:30.9
1991	Brixton Town †	Rick Dominguez	R. Ang	SME Stable	2:39.6
1990	Man Of Honour V	G. Hall	Teh Choon Beng	Auric Stable	2:30.7
1989	Istanbul	A. John	Malcolm Thwaites	Taj Stable	2:31.5
1988	Grand Illusion	Leslie Khoo	Charlie Read	Redcap Stable	2:35.0
1987	Chinese Wall	Grant Cooksley	W. Chua	Tan Sri Stable	2:28.7
1986	Feu vert	K. C. Ng	Ivan W. Allan	Ace-In-The-Hole Stable	2:29.7
1985	Feu Vert	K. C. Ng	Ivan W. Allan	Ace-In-The-Hole Stable	2:33.8
1984	Win-Em-All	Jimmy Bleasdale	S. H. Lee	Coronation Stable	2:27.6
1983	Andermatt	Jimmy Bleasdale	Ivan W. Allan	Equus Stable	2:31.4
1982	Timber Tycoon	S. Sairi	G.E. West	Golden Arrow Stable	2:38.4
1981	Grand Harvest	T. G. Autridge	Ivan W. Allan	Lee Ah Seong	2:34.5
1980	Vaaron	Larry N. Francis	Ivan W. Allan	Upali Stable	2:31.3
1979	Saas Fee	Lester Piggott	Ivan W. Allan	Equus Stable	2:30.1
1978	Regal Tan	Larry Olsen	Teh Choon Beng	Goodman Stable	2:37.6
1977	Batu Karang	R. Rajoo	D. Tan	Tong Stable	2:33.8
1976	Suspicion	Terry Lucas	Ivan W. Allan	No Expense Stable	2:37.4
1975	Tien An Mun	Johnny L. Wilson	Teh Choon Beng	Auric Stable	2:34.4
1974	Dilettante	G. S. Sng	Ivan W. Allan	Dillettante Stable	2:31.6
1973	Showgirl V	L. F. Harbridge	C. M. Tulloh	Shaw Stable	2:41.0
1972	Jumbo Jet	Johnny L. Wilson	Ivan W. Allan	Lee Ah Seong	2:31.0
1971	Forest Jim	J. J. Miller	Teh Choon Beng	Income Kongsi	2:39.0
1970	Keep Going	Glynn M. Pretty	Rinus van Breukelen	Auric Stable	2:36.6
1969	November Sun	Garnet Bougoure	Rinus van Breukelen	MC Stable	2:06.6
1968	November Sun	Garnet Bougoure	Rinus van Breukelen	MC Stable	2:40.4
1967	Gambalan	L. Kang	K. Y. Lee	Sultan of Pahang	2:17.0
1966	Grenadier	Alan J. Trevena	Rinus van Breukelen	Ng Loong Kee	2:32.4
1965	Oleander III	Keith G. Moxham	S. K. Tjoa	Pil Stable	2:32.4
1964	Moviegoer	Frank G. Moore	C. M. Tulloh	Shaw Stable	2:31.4
1963	Dark Romance II	Johnny L. Wilson	M. Sullivan	Winning Stable	2:30.6
1962	Amsterdam	Moses Lee	K. R. Daniels	Latin Stable	2:38.2
1961	White Heather	M. J. Posner	John Rodgers	H. Cowling	2:35.0
1960	Marksman	Arthur F. Ward	K. R. Daniels	AP Stable	2:30.0
1959	Flying Dragon	Moses Lee	John Rodgers	M/M Loh Chin	2:38.0

- † 2006 winner Our Falstaff was originally registered as Falstaff.
- † 1991 winner Brixton Town was originally registered as Tamanaco
