= Kranji Mile =

Thoroughbred horse race in Singapore

- Class: Group 1
- Location: Singapore Turf Club; Singapore
- Inaugurated: 2000
- Race type: Thoroughbred - Flat racing
- Website: Singapore Turf Club

Race information
- Distance: 1600 metres (8 furlongs)
- Surface: Turf
- Track: Left-handed
- Qualification: Three-years-old & up
- Weight: Weight-for-age; Fillies & Mares: 1.5 kg allowance
- Purse: S$1,000,000

The Kranji Mile was a thoroughbred horse race held annually in May at Singapore Turf Club. The race was first introduced in 2000. The race, contested on turf over a left-handed course, is a domestic Group 1 event (also recognized as an International Group 3 race by the International Federation of Horseracing) and covers a distance of 1,600 metres (8 furlongs), open to horses aged three and older. In 2018, it was revamped as an invitational race, but since 2020, it has been open to local runners only due to races being conducted behind closed doors.

The 2024 edition was the last to be held before the cessation of horse racing in Singapore.

== Records ==
Speed record:

- 1:32.81 – Lim’s Kosciuszko (2023)

Most wins:

- 2 - Better Than Ever (2010, 2011)
- 2 - Pacific Prince (2000, 2002)
- 2 - Southern Legend (2018, 2019)
- 2 - Lim's Kosciuszko (2023, 2024)

Most wins by an owner:

- 4 - Lim’s Stable (2008, 2022, 2023, 2024)

Most wins by a jockey:

- 2 - Saimee Jumaat (2010, 2011)
- 2 - John Powell (2005, 2009)
- 2 - Danny Beasley (2013, 2014)
- 2 - Michael Rodd (2015, 2016)
- 2 - Zac Purton (2018, 2019)
- 2 - Wong Chin Chuen (2022, 2023)

Most wins by a trainer:

- 5 - Laurie Laxon (2008, 2009, 2010, 2011, 2015)

== Winners ==
Winners of the Kranji Mile are as follows.

| Year | Winner | Jockey | Trainer | Owner | Time |
|---|---|---|---|---|---|
| 2000 | Pacific Prince | Darryll Holland | Charles Leck | Prince Stable | 1:36.0 |
| 2001 | Smart Bet | Grant Cooksley | Mohd Yusof | Smart Bet Stable | 1:37.8 |
| 2002 | Pacific Prince | W. H. Lao | Charles Leck | Prince Stable | 1:35.4 |
| 2003 | Blizz Bless | Johnny Geroudis | Patrick Shaw | Fred Crabbia | 1:36.4 |
| 2004 | Mayo's Music | Jason Patton | John Meagher | Kings Stable | 1:42.8 |
| 2005 | Really Good | John Powell | Don Baertschiger | Good Stable | 1:37.7 |
| 2006 | Recast | Oscar Chavez | John Meagher | Kings Stable | 1:37.5 |
| 2007 | Setembro Chove | Robbie Fradd | Patrick Shaw | Jose L. Glaser | 1:35.5 |
| 2008 | Top Spin | Noel Callow | Laurie Laxon | Lim's Stable | 1:35.7 |
| 2009 | Waikato | John Powell | Laurie Laxon | Silver Fern Racing Stable | 1:33.8 |
| 2010 | Better Than Ever | Saimee Jumaat | Laurie Laxon | Jupiter Stable | 1:35.1 |
| 2011 | Better Than Ever | Saimee Jumaat | Laurie Laxon | Jupiter Stable | 1:35.6 |
| 2012 | Better Life | Alan Munro | Hideyuki Takaoka | Suzuka Racing Stable | 1:35.96 |
| 2013 | Cash Luck | Danny Beasley | David Kok | Northwest Racing Stable | 1:34.47 |
| 2014 | War Affair | Danny Beasley | Alvin Tan | Warplan Racing Stable | 1:33.72 |
| 2015 | Stepitup | Michael Rodd | Laurie Laxon | Tivic Stable | 1:34.59 |
| 2016 | Debt Collector | Michael Rodd | Cliff Brown | Barree Stable | 1:34.43 |
| 2017 | Infantry | Manoel Nunes | Alvin Tan | Kajorn Petch Racing No 2 Stable | 1:35.80 |
| 2018 | Southern Legend | Zac Purton | Caspar Fownes | Boniface Ho Ka Kui | 1:33.79 |
| 2019 | Southern Legend | Zac Purton | Caspar Fownes | Boniface Ho Ka Kui | 1:33.61 |
| 2020 | Aramaayo | Ruan Maia | Shane Baertschiger | Aramco Stable | 1:33.85 |
| 2021 | Minister | A'Isisuhairi Kasim | Donna Logan | King Power Stable | 1:34.38 |
| 2022 | Lim's Lightning | Wong Chin Chuen | Daniel Meagher | Lim's Stable | 1:33.25 |
| 2023 | Lim's Kosciuszko | Wong Chin Chuen | Daniel Meagher | Lim's Stable | 1:32.81 |
| 2024 | Lim's Kosciuszko | Marc Lerner | Daniel Meagher | Lim's Stable | 1:34.21 |
