= Mick Dittman =

Australian jockey

Personal information
- Born: 2 July 1952 (age 74) Rockhampton, Queensland

Horse racing career
- Sport: Horse racing

Major racing wins
- Melbourne Cup (1982); Caulfield Cup (1990); W. S. Cox Plate (1983, 1984); Golden Slipper Stakes (1981, 1986, 1993); Victoria Derby (1982, 1984); Champagne Stakes (1986, 1990); Australian Derby (1983, 1989); Australian Oaks (1987, 1989, 1993); Sires' Produce Stakes (ATC) (1981, 1988); Rosehill Guineas (1981, 1983, 1984); The BMW (1977, 1985, 1990, 1993); Epsom Handicap (1992); Doomben Cup (1972, 1976); Doomben 10,000 (1973, 1981, 1985, 1995); Brisbane Cup (1974); Marlboro Classic (1978, 1994, 1998); VRC Oaks (1978, 1988); Blue Diamond Stakes (1980, 1986); Sires' Produce Stakes (VRC) (1981); Newmarket Handicap (1981, 1993); Queensland Derby (1976, 1983, 1995); Queensland Oaks (1990); Sires' Produce Stakes (BRC) (1974); WATC Derby (1987, 1988, 1989); The Metropolitan (1988, 1992); Lightning Stakes (1995); Australian Cup (1993); Sydney Cup (1993); BTC Cup (1996); Coolmore Classic (1993); C F Orr Stakes (1994); Futurity Stakes (1994)

Honours
- Australian Racing Hall of Fame (2002)

Significant horses
- Gurner's Lane; Sydeston; Strawberry Road; Red Anchor; Research

Leonard Ross "Mick" Dittman (born 2 July 1952 in Rockhampton Queensland) is a retired Australian Racing Hall of Fame jockey.

Nicknamed "The Enforcer" due to his strong use of the whip, he was renowned for his vigour and strength in a tight finish. He rose to become one of the best jockeys in the country.

Some of the achievements during his career included winning the Melbourne Cup (Gurner's Lane), three Golden Slippers (Full On Aces, Bounding Away and Bint Marscay), two Cox Plates (Red Anchor and Strawberry Road) and a Caulfield Cup (Sydeston).

During a career spanning more than thirty years in the saddle it is estimated he has won more than 1,700 races (which included 88 Group 1 races) and through his partnership with trainer Tommy Smith also won three Sydney Jockey Premierships.

Mick Dittman was inducted in the Australian Racing Hall of Fame in 2002.
