= Bukit Timah Race Course =

Former race course in Bukit Timah, Singapore

The Bukit Timah Race Course was a venue for Thoroughbred horse racing in the Bukit Timah area of Singapore. Built by the Bukit Timah Turf Club, it was opened on 15 April 1933 by the Governor of Singapore. There was no racing from 1941 through 1946 as a result of World War II.

During its sixty-six years, Bukit Timah Race Course was visited by numerous Singapore and foreign dignitaries including a 1972 visit by racing fan and Thoroughbred owner, Her Majesty Queen Elizabeth II, Prince Philip and Princess Anne. In honor of her visit, the Queen Elizabeth II Cup was established.

In 1959 the Singapore Derby was revived at Bukit Timah Race Course and was the feature race on its final day of operation on 25 July 1999. It was closed to make way for Kranji Racecourse.

== Turf City ==
Turf City was opened in 1999 with a 10-year lease until 2010. Its first tenant was Singapore Agro Agricultural (SAA). Singapore Land Authority wanted this tenant to extend its lease until 1 March 2012. By this time, SH Cogent (Cogent Land Capital) took over the Turf City portion and several shops had been closed and demolished. Turf City was renamed 'The Grandstand' and opened after upgrading in July 2012.

As connectivity was poor until 2015, shuttle buses were originally provided from Toa Payoh or Clementi. After that, connections were provided from Botanic Gardens or Sixth Avenue. The Bukit Timah Race Course area was shut down in 2023 to make way for future development, including the MRT station at the former Turf City and a mix of public and private homes.
