= 2007–08 World Thoroughbred Racehorse Rankings =

The 2007–08 World Thoroughbred Racehorse Rankings is the 2007–08 edition of the World Thoroughbred Racehorse Rankings. It is an assessment of racehorses which was issued by the International Federation of Horseracing Authorities (IFHA) in August 2008. It includes horses aged three or older which raced or were trained during 2007–08 in countries where the flat racing year runs from August 1 to July 31 (and also South America, where it runs from July 1 to June 30). These countries are generally in the Southern Hemisphere, although some areas covered, such as Hong Kong and the United Arab Emirates, are actually north of the equator.

The ratings represent a weight value in pounds, with higher values given to horses which showed greater ability. It is judged that these weights would equalize the abilities of the horses if carried in a theoretical handicap race. The list includes all horses rated 115 or above, and it also shows the surface and the distances at which the rating was achieved.

The highest rating in the 2007–08 season was 130, which was given to the performance of Curlin in the Dubai World Cup. In total, 80 horses were included in the list, fifteen more than in the 2006–07 Rankings.

== Full rankings for 2007–08 ==
- Country foaled – Horse names are followed by a suffix indicating the country where foaled.
- Age – The ages shown for horses foaled in the Southern Hemisphere are as of their universal date of increase, August 1, 2007. The ages of those born in the Northern Hemisphere are taken from their equivalent date, January 1, 2008.
- Sex – The following abbreviations are used:
  - C – Colt – Ungelded male horse up to four-years-old.
  - F – Filly – Female horse up to four-years-old.
  - H – Horse – Ungelded male horse over four-years-old.
  - M – Mare – Female horse over four-years-old.
  - G – Gelding – Gelded male horse of any age.

Rank	Rating	Horse	Age	Sex	Trained	Surface	Distance (m)
1	130	Curlin (USA)	4	C	United States	Dirt	2,000
2	123	El Segundo (NZ)	6	G	Australia	Turf	2,040
2	123	Ramonti (FR)	6	H	UAE	Turf	2,000
2	123	Sacred Kingdom (AUS)	4	G	Hong Kong	Turf	1,200
5	122	Good Ba Ba (USA)	6	G	Hong Kong	Turf	1,600
5	122	Viva Pataca (GB)	6	G	Hong Kong	Turf	2,000
5	122	Weekend Hussler (AUS)	3	G	Australia	Turf	1,200 / 1,500
8	121	Apache Cat (AUS)	5	G	Australia	Turf	1,200 / 1,350
8	121	Pocket Power (SAF)	5	G	South Africa	Turf	2,200
10	120	Archipenko (USA)	4	C	UAE	Turf	1,600 / 2,000
10	120	Efficient (NZ)	4	G	Australia	Turf	3,200
10	120	Haradasun (AUS)	4	C	Aus. / Ireland	Turf	1,600
10	120	Honour Devil (ARG)	3	C	UAE	Dirt	1,800
10	120	Jay Peg (SAF)	4	C	UAE	Turf	1,777
10	120	J J the Jet Plane (SAF)	3	G	South Africa	Turf	1,200
10	120	Sun Classique (AUS)	4	F	UAE	Turf	2,400
17	119	Benny the Bull (USA)	5	H	United States	Dirt	1,200
17	119	Doctor Dino (FR)	6	H	France	Turf	2,400
17	119	Linngari (IRE)	6	H	UAE / GB	Turf	2,000
17	119	Marasco (AUS)	5	G	Australia	Turf	1,600
17	119	Quijano (GER)	6	G	Germany	Turf	2,400
17	119	Racing to Win (AUS)	5	G	Australia	Turf	1,500
17	119	Sirmione (AUS)	4	G	Australia	Turf	2,000
17	119	Wonderful World (AUS)	4	C	Australia	Turf	2,040
25	118	Armada (NZ)	6	G	Hong Kong	Turf	1,600
25	118	Creachadoir (IRE)	4	C	UAE	Turf	1,600
25	118	Maldivian (NZ)	5	G	Australia	Turf	2,000
25	118	Miss Andretti (AUS)	6	M	Australia	Turf	1,200
25	118	Oracle West (SAF)	6	G	UAE	Turf	1,777
25	118	Sushisan (AUS)	5	G	UAE	Turf	2,400
25	118	Youmzain (IRE)	5	H	Great Britain	Turf	2,400
32	117	Absolute Champion (AUS)	6	G	Hong Kong	Turf	1,000 / 1,200
32	117	Asiatic Boy (ARG)	4	C	UAE	Dirt	2,000
32	117	Diabolical (USA)	5	H	UAE	Dirt	1,200
32	117	Mythical Flight (SAF)	4	G	South Africa	Turf	1,000
32	117	Takeover Target (AUS)	8	G	Australia	Turf	1,000 / 1,200 / 1,400
37	116	Balius (IRE)	5	H	France	Turf	2,000
37	116	Bussoni (GER)	7	H	Germany	Turf	2,400
37	116	Buy and Sell (SAF)	4	G	South Africa	Turf	2,000
37	116	Gold Edition (AUS)	4	F	Australia	Turf	1,200
37	116	Hunting Tower (SAF)	5	G	South Africa	Turf	2,000
37	116	Mentality (AUS)	4	G	Australia	Turf	1,550
37	116	Niconero (AUS)	6	G	Australia	Turf	1,600
37	116	Packing Winner (NZ)	5	G	Hong Kong	Turf	2,400
37	116	Pick Six (SAF)	4	G	South Africa	Turf	1,800
37	116	Royal Delight (AUS)	5	G	Hong Kong	Turf	1,200
37	116	Rubiscent (AUS)	5	G	Australia	Turf	1,800
37	116	Sarrera (AUS)	7	G	Australia	Turf	2,000
37	116	Well Armed (USA)	5	G	United States	Dirt	2,000
50	115	A. P. Arrow (USA)	6	H	United States	Dirt	2,000
50	115	Biarritz (SAF)	4	C	South Africa	Turf	1,400 / 1,600
50	115	Bullish Luck (USA)	9	G	Hong Kong	Turf	1,800 / 2,000
50	115	Casino Prince (AUS)	4	C	Australia	Turf	1,400 / 1,500 / 1,600
50	115	C'est la Guerre (NZ)	3	C	New Zealand	Turf	2,400
50	115	Darjina (FR)	4	F	France	Turf	1,777
50	115	Divine Madonna (AUS)	5	M	Australia	Turf	1,600
50	115	Eremein (AUS)	6	H	Australia	Turf	1,500
50	115	Floatyourboat (SAF)	5	G	South Africa	Turf	1,600 / 1,800 / 2,000
50	115	Floral Pegasus (AUS)	5	H	Hong Kong	Turf	1,600 / 1,777 / 2,000
50	115	Happy Boy (BRZ)	4	C	Brazil	Dirt	1,600
50	115	Idiot Proof (USA)	4	C	United States	Dirt	1,200
50	115	Jalil (USA)	4	C	UAE	Dirt	2,000
50	115	Kings Gambit (SAF)	3	G	South Africa	Turf	1,800
50	115	Light Fantastic (AUS)	3	G	Australia	Turf	1,600
50	115	Magnus (AUS)	5	H	Australia	Turf	1,100 / 1,200
50	115	Miss Finland (AUS)	4	F	Australia	Turf	1,400
50	115	Murtajill (AUS)	3	C	Australia	Turf	1,400
50	115	Nom du Jeu (NZ)	3	C	New Zealand	Turf	2,000 / 2,400
50	115	Paratroopers (AUS)	5	G	Australia	Turf	1,200
50	115	Sanziro (AUS)	6	G	Hong Kong	Turf	1,200
50	115	Scenic Shot (AUS)	5	H	Australia	Turf	2,000
50	115	Seachange (NZ)	5	M	New Zealand	Turf	1,200
50	115	Shinzig (AUS)	6	H	Australia	Turf	2,000
50	115	Spirit of Tara (AUS)	6	H	Australia	Turf	2,400
50	115	Successful Bidder (SAF)	6	G	South Africa	Turf	1,600
50	115	Swick (NZ)	6	G	Australia	Turf	1,000
50	115	Tawqeet (USA)	6	H	Australia	Turf	2,400
50	115	Tipungwuti (AUS)	4	C	Australia	Turf	1,400
50	115	Tuesday Joy (NZ)	4	F	Australia	Turf	2,400
50	115	Zipping (AUS)	6	G	Australia	Turf	2,000

Certain horses may have also recorded a lesser rating over a distance different to that listed above. The IFHA publishes this information when the lower rating represents the overall top performance in a particular category. There was one such additional rating for this season:

Rank	Rating	Horse	Age	Sex	Trained	Surface	Distance (m)
+	120	Viva Pataca (GB)	6	G	Hong Kong	Turf	2,400

== Top ranked horses ==
The tables below show the top ranked horses overall, the top fillies and mares, and the top three-year-olds in the 2007–08 Rankings. They also show the top performers in various subdivisions of each group, which are defined by the distances of races, and the surfaces on which they are run. The IFHA recognizes five distance categories — Sprint, Mile, Intermediate, Long and Extended — identified by the acronym "SMILE". These are framed as follows:

- Sprint: 1,000–1,300m (1,000–1,599m for races in Canada and the United States)
- Mile: 1,301–1,899m (1,600–1,899m for races in Canada and the United States)
- Intermediate: 1,900–2,100m
- Long: 2,101–2,700m
- Extended: 2,701m +

All Horses
	All Surfaces	Dirt	Turf
All Distances	130 – Curlin	130 – Curlin	123 – El Segundo; 123 – Ramonti; 123 – Sacred Kingdom
Sprint	123 – Sacred Kingdom	119 – Benny the Bull	123 – Sacred Kingdom
Mile	122 – Good Ba Ba; 122 – Weekend Hussler	120 – Honour Devil	122 – Good Ba Ba; 122 – Weekend Hussler
Intermediate	130 – Curlin	130 – Curlin	123 – El Segundo; 123 – Ramonti
Long	120 – Sun Classique; 120 – Viva Pataca	not listed	120 – Sun Classique; 120 – Viva Pataca
Extended	120 – Efficient	not listed	120 – Efficient
Fillies and Mares
	All Surfaces	Dirt	Turf
All Distances	120 – Sun Classique	not listed	120 – Sun Classique
Sprint	118 – Miss Andretti	not listed	118 – Miss Andretti
Mile	115 – Darjina; 115 – Divine Madonna; 115 – Miss Finland	not listed	115 – Darjina; 115 – Divine Madonna; 115 – Miss Finland
Intermediate	not listed	not listed	not listed
Long	120 – Sun Classique	not listed	120 – Sun Classique
Extended	not listed	not listed	not listed
Three-Year-Olds
	All Surfaces	Dirt	Turf
All Distances	122 – Weekend Hussler	120 – Honour Devil	122 – Weekend Hussler
Sprint	122 – Weekend Hussler	not listed	122 – Weekend Hussler
Mile	122 – Weekend Hussler	120 – Honour Devil	122 – Weekend Hussler
Intermediate	115 – Nom du Jeu	not listed	115 – Nom du Jeu
Long	115 – C'est la Guerre; 115 – Nom du Jeu	not listed	115 – C'est la Guerre; 115 – Nom du Jeu
Extended	not listed	not listed	not listed

== Possible errors ==
During the creation of this article the following anomalies were found in the 2007–08 Rankings:

- Pocket Power received a rating of 121 for his victory in the Vodacom Durban July Stakes over 2,200 metres. The IFHA has categorized this as "Intermediate" (1,900–2,100m) rather than "Long" (2,101–2,700m). The rating is higher than that of the official top ranked horses in the latter category, Sun Classique and Viva Pataca, who were both rated at 120.
- Shinzig was given a rating of 115 for his victory in the C F Orr Stakes. The distance is shown as 2,000 metres, although the race was actually run over 1,400 metres. The IFHA has correctly placed the performance in the "Mile" category (1,301–1,899m).
