= 2006–07 World Thoroughbred Racehorse Rankings =

The 2006–07 World Thoroughbred Racehorse Rankings is the 2006–07 edition of the World Thoroughbred Racehorse Rankings. It is an assessment of racehorses which was issued by the International Federation of Horseracing Authorities (IFHA) in August 2007. It includes horses aged three or older which raced or were trained during 2006–07 in countries where the flat racing year runs from August 1 to July 31 (and also South America, where it runs from July 1 to June 30). These countries are generally in the Southern Hemisphere, although some areas covered, such as Hong Kong and the United Arab Emirates, are actually north of the equator.

The ratings represent a weight value in pounds, with higher values given to horses which showed greater ability. It is judged that these weights would equalize the abilities of the horses if carried in a theoretical handicap race. The list includes all horses rated 115 or above, and it also shows the surface and the distances at which the rating was achieved.

The highest rating in the 2006–07 season was 129, which was given to the performance of Invasor in the Dubai World Cup. In total, 65 horses were included in the list, eighteen more than in the 2005–06 Rankings.

== Full rankings for 2006–07 ==
- Country foaled – Horse names are followed by a suffix indicating the country where foaled.
- Age – The ages shown for horses foaled in the Southern Hemisphere are as of their universal date of increase, August 1, 2006. The ages of those born in the Northern Hemisphere are taken from their equivalent date, January 1, 2007.
- Sex – The following abbreviations are used:
  - C – Colt – Ungelded male horse up to four-years-old.
  - F – Filly – Female horse up to four-years-old.
  - H – Horse – Ungelded male horse over four-years-old.
  - M – Mare – Female horse over four-years-old.
  - G – Gelding – Gelded male horse of any age.

| Rank | Rating | Horse | Age | Sex | Trained | Surface | Distance (m) |
|---|---|---|---|---|---|---|---|
| 1 | 129 | Invasor (ARG) | 4 | C | United States | Dirt | 2,000 |
| 2 | 125 | Admire Moon (JPN) | 4 | C | Japan | Turf | 1,777 |
| 2 | 125 | Premium Tap (USA) | 5 | H | Saudi Arabia | Dirt | 2,000 |
| 4 | 122 | Linngari (IRE) | 5 | H | South Africa | Turf | 1,777 |
| 4 | 122 | Vengeance of Rain (NZ) | 6 | G | Hong Kong | Turf | 2,400 |
| 4 | 122 | Viva Pataca (GB) | 5 | G | Hong Kong | Turf | 2,400 |
| 7 | 121 | Absolute Champion (AUS) | 5 | G | Hong Kong | Turf | 1,200 |
| 8 | 120 | Armada (NZ) | 5 | G | Hong Kong | Turf | 1,600 |
| 8 | 120 | Asiatic Boy (ARG) | 3 | C | South Africa | Dirt | 1,800 |
| 8 | 120 | Delta Blues (JPN) | 6 | H | Japan | Turf | 3,200 |
| 8 | 120 | El Segundo (NZ) | 5 | G | Australia | Turf | 1,400 |
| 8 | 120 | Miss Andretti (AUS) | 5 | M | Australia | Turf | 1,000 |
| 8 | 120 | Takeover Target (AUS) | 7 | G | Australia | Turf | 1,200 |
| 8 | 120 | Pompeii Ruler (AUS) | 4 | G | Australia | Turf | 2,000 |
| 15 | 119 | Desert War (AUS) | 6 | G | Australia | Turf | 2,000 |
| 15 | 119 | Fields of Omagh (AUS) | 9 | G | Australia | Turf | 2,000 |
| 15 | 119 | Oracle West (SAF) | 5 | G | South Africa | Turf | 2,400 |
| 15 | 119 | Racing to Win (AUS) | 4 | G | Australia | Turf | 1,600 |
| 19 | 118 | Collier Hill (GB) | 9 | G | Great Britain | Turf | 2,400 |
| 19 | 118 | Laverock (IRE) | 5 | H | UAE | Turf | 2,400 |
| 19 | 118 | Marasco (AUS) | 4 | G | Australia | Turf | 2,000 |
| 19 | 118 | Pride (FR) | 7 | M | France | Turf | 2,000 |
| 19 | 118 | Sir Percy (GB) | 4 | C | Great Britain | Turf | 2,400 |
| 19 | 118 | Yeats (IRE) | 6 | H | Ireland | Turf | 3,200 |
| 19 | 118 | Youmzain (IRE) | 4 | C | Great Britain | Turf | 2,400 |
| 26 | 117 | Bentley Biscuit (AUS) | 5 | G | Australia | Turf | 1,200 / 1,400 |
| 26 | 117 | Haradasun (AUS) | 3 | C | Australia | Turf | 1,500 |
| 26 | 117 | He's No Pie Eater (AUS) | 3 | C | Australia | Turf | 1,600 |
| 26 | 117 | Mentality (AUS) | 3 | G | Australia | Turf | 1,600 |
| 26 | 117 | Mythical Flight (SAF) | 3 | G | South Africa | Turf | 1,200 |
| 26 | 117 | Red Dazzler (AUS) | 4 | C | Australia | Turf | 1,600 |
| 26 | 117 | The Duke (AUS) | 7 | G | Hong Kong | Turf | 1,600 |
| 33 | 116 | Able One (NZ) | 4 | G | Hong Kong | Turf | 1,600 |
| 33 | 116 | Casual Pass (AUS) | 6 | G | Australia | Turf | 2,000 |
| 33 | 116 | Dance Hero (AUS) | 5 | G | Australia | Turf | 1,200 |
| 33 | 116 | Fiumicino (NZ) | 3 | G | Australia | Turf | 2,400 |
| 33 | 116 | Hello Pretty (AUS) | 5 | G | Hong Kong | Turf | 1,600 |
| 33 | 116 | Kapil (SAF) | 4 | G | South Africa | Turf | 1,600 |
| 33 | 116 | Our Smoking Joe (AUS) | 6 | G | Australia | Turf | 2,000 |
| 33 | 116 | Pop Rock (JPN) | 6 | H | Japan | Turf | 2,400 |
| 33 | 116 | Pocket Power (SAF) | 4 | G | South Africa | Turf | 2,200 |
| 33 | 116 | Spring at Last (USA) | 4 | C | United States | Dirt | 1,600 |
| 33 | 116 | Sushisan (AUS) | 4 | G | South Africa | Turf | 2,400 |
| 33 | 116 | Tawqeet (USA) | 5 | H | Australia | Turf | 2,000 / 2,400 |
| 45 | 115 | Apache Cat (AUS) | 4 | C | Australia | Turf | 1,500 / 1,600 |
| 45 | 115 | Blutigeroo (AUS) | 5 | G | Australia | Turf | 2,400 |
| 45 | 115 | Bullish Luck (USA) | 8 | G | Hong Kong | Turf | 2,000 |
| 45 | 115 | Court's in Session (AUS) | 7 | G | Australia | Turf | 1,400 |
| 45 | 115 | Darci Brahma (NZ) | 4 | C | New Zealand | Turf | 1,200 |
| 45 | 115 | Efficient (NZ) | 3 | C | Australia | Turf | 2,500 |
| 45 | 115 | Eremein (AUS) | 5 | G | Australia | Turf | 1,400 / 1,550 |
| 45 | 115 | Gold Edition (AUS) | 3 | F | Australia | Turf | 1,200 / 1,400 |
| 45 | 115 | Good Ba Ba (USA) | 5 | G | Hong Kong | Turf | 1,600 |
| 45 | 115 | Joyful Winner (AUS) | 6 | G | Hong Kong | Turf | 1,400 |
| 45 | 115 | Kelly's Landing (USA) | 6 | G | United States | Dirt | 1,200 |
| 45 | 115 | Kildonan (SAF) | 3 | C | South Africa | Turf | 1,200 |
| 45 | 115 | Lad of the Manor (NZ) | 7 | G | Australia | Turf | 1,600 |
| 45 | 115 | Magnus (AUS) | 4 | C | Australia | Turf | 1,000 / 1,100 / 1,200 |
| 45 | 115 | Quijano (GER) | 5 | G | Germany | Turf | 2,400 |
| 45 | 115 | Seihali (IRE) | 8 | H | UAE | Turf | 1,500 / 1,777 |
| 45 | 115 | Sir Ernesto (AUS) | 5 | G | Hong Kong | Turf | 2,000 |
| 45 | 115 | Sphenophyta (NZ) | 6 | G | Australia | Turf | 2,000 |
| 45 | 115 | Song of Wind (JPN) | 4 | C | Japan | Turf | 2,400 |
| 45 | 115 | Super Kid (NZ) | 7 | H | Australia | Turf | 1,400 |
| 45 | 115 | Undue (AUS) | 5 | G | Australia | Turf | 1,100 / 1,200 |

Certain horses may have also recorded a lesser rating over a distance different from that listed above. The IFHA usually publishes this information when the lower rating represents the overall top performance in a particular category. There were no such additional ratings for this season, although the following two were included in a supplementary article, the Top Ranked Performers by Age, Distance and Surface:

| Rank | Rating | Horse | Age | Sex | Trained | Surface | Distance (m) |
|---|---|---|---|---|---|---|---|
| + | 115 | Haradasun (AUS) | 3 | C | Australia | Turf | (1,900–2,100) |
| + | 115 | He's No Pie Eater (AUS) | 3 | C | Australia | Turf | (1,900–2,100) |

== Top ranked horses ==
The tables below show the top ranked horses overall, the top fillies and mares, and the top three-year-olds in the 2006–07 Rankings. They also show the top performers in various subdivisions of each group, which are defined by the distances of races, and the surfaces on which they are run. Top ranked horses rated less than 115 are included where known. The IFHA recognizes five distance categories — Sprint, Mile, Intermediate, Long and Extended — identified by the acronym "SMILE". These are framed as follows:

- Sprint: 1,000–1,300m (1,000–1,599m for races in Canada and the United States)
- Mile: 1,301–1,899m (1,600–1,899m for races in Canada and the United States)
- Intermediate: 1,900–2,100m
- Long: 2,101–2,700m
- Extended: 2,701m +

All Horses
| | All Surfaces | Dirt | Turf |
| All Distances | 129 – Invasor | 129 – Invasor | 125 – Admire Moon |
| Sprint | 121 – Absolute Champion | 115 – Kelly's Landing | 121 – Absolute Champion |
| Mile | 125 – Admire Moon | 120 – Asiatic Boy | 125 – Admire Moon |
| Intermediate | 129 – Invasor | 129 – Invasor | 120 – Pompeii Ruler |
| Long | 122 – Vengeance of Rain; 122 – Viva Pataca | not listed | 122 – Vengeance of Rain; 122 – Viva Pataca |
| Extended | 120 – Delta Blues | not listed | 120 – Delta Blues |
Fillies and Mares
| | All Surfaces | Dirt | Turf |
| All Distances | 120 – Miss Andretti | 111 – National Colour | 120 – Miss Andretti |
| Sprint | 120 – Miss Andretti | 111 – National Colour | 120 – Miss Andretti |
| Mile | 115 – Gold Edition | not listed | 115 – Gold Edition |
| Intermediate | 118 – Pride | not listed | 118 – Pride |
| Long | 114 – Aqua d'Amore; 114 – Miss Finland | not listed | 114 – Aqua d'Amore; 114 – Miss Finland |
| Extended | not listed | not listed | not listed |
Three-Year-Olds
| | All Surfaces | Dirt | Turf |
| All Distances | 120 – Asiatic Boy | 120 – Asiatic Boy | 117 – Haradasun; 117 – He's No Pie Eater; 117 – Mentality; 117 – Mythical Flight |
| Sprint | 117 – Mythical Flight | not listed | 117 – Mythical Flight |
| Mile | 120 – Asiatic Boy | 120 – Asiatic Boy | 117 – Haradasun; 117 – He's No Pie Eater; 117 – Mentality |
| Intermediate | 115 – Haradasun; 115 – He's No Pie Eater | not listed | 115 – Haradasun; 115 – He's No Pie Eater |
| Long | 116 – Fiumicino | not listed | 116 – Fiumicino |
| Extended | not listed | not listed | not listed |
