= Hucklebuck (horse) =

Australian-bred Thoroughbred racehorse

- Sire: Elvstroem
- Grandsire: Danehill
- Dam: Kondari
- Damsire: O'Reilly
- Sex: Gelding
- Foaled: 30 September 2010
- Died: March 26, 2017 (aged 6)
- Country: Australia
- Colour: bay or brown
- Owner: C K Li
- Trainer: Phillip Stokes
- Record: 20-8-1-2
- Earnings: A$1,164,320

Major wins
- C S Hayes Stakes (G3)(2014); Yellowglen Stakes (G3)(2014); Emirates Stakes (G1)(2014)
- Last updated on 27 March 2017

Hucklebuck (30 September 2010 – 26 March 2017) was a Thoroughbred racehorse trained and bred in Australia. He won the Emirates Stakes, a Group one race. He won over a million dollars in stakes.

== Career ==
Hucklebuck was purchased for $50,000 at the 2012 Adelaide yearling sales by Phillip Stokes Racing Pty Ltd.

Hucklebuck made his debut at Gawler on 11 August 2013, winning by over 4 lengths. 4 weeks later, he won his next race at Morphettville. These two races, with Jackson Matthews aboard, were the only times that Dom Tourneur was not used as jockey. In the next two months, Hucklebuck had three races in Victoria, winning the listed Gothic Stakes.

The C S Hayes Stakes was the first group race won by Hucklebuck on 15 February 2014. He was sitting comfortably in fifth before being bumped at the final turn. Hucklebuck then pulled away, gaining the lead with a hundred metres to run. Tourneur said, "I wanted to get into the home straight before hitting the button and he travelled sweet for me all the way. When I asked him there was plenty there, it was a good win."

After failing to place in the Australian Guineas, Hucklebuck had two poor showings in Brisbane before being spelled. Trainer Phillip Stokes claimed the horse disliked the clockwise running in the northern states. He said, "I don’t want to send him to Sydney. He didn’t go any good up in Brisbane that way of going, so I’ve ruled all that out."

On 1 November 2014, Hucklebuck won the Group 3 Yellowglen Stakes at Flemington. A week later, Hucklebuck earned $600,000 when he won the Group 1 Emirates Stakes, narrowly outlasting Lucky Hussler. Having lost the previous two attempts at 1600 metres, there was some doubt over Hucklebuck's ability to race at the distance. Tourneur said, "He was friendless today in the betting because there were doubters saying he couldn't get the trip and saying he over-races… but he has more friends now."

In May 2015, Hucklebuck was crowned the South Australian Horse of the Year.

Troubled by knee problems, Hucklebuck made only one appearance in 2015.

Hucklebuck resumed in January 2016. In February, he ran down the outside late for a third in the C F Orr Stakes behind Suavito, and then finished 8th in the Futurity Stakes. Stokes said, "Sometimes when he gets in front he just doesn't seem to switch off, so we'll have a think about him but I probably won't push on to Sydney on the back of that." Hucklebuck did go on to make his Sydney debut a fortnight later, finishing 8th in the George Ryder Stakes.

Returning in September 2016, Hucklebuck placed fourth in Caulfield in what was described as "a top return". Three weeks later he contested his last race, the Group 2 Schillaci Stakes, retiring due to injury. Stokes said, "He's got a tear in his suspensory (ligament) and it would require four months off and he's had a few niggling problems for a while now so we thought it would be better to retire him." On 21 March 2017, Hucklebuck was euthanised after a bout of colic.
