= Brad Rawiller =

Australian jockey

Brad Rawiller (born 1978 or 1979) is an Australian jockey based in Victoria. In May 2024 he rode his 3,000th winner. His older brother Nash is also a leading jockey.

Rawiller grew up in Bendigo and had his first race ride at Kerang in 1994. As of late January 2025, he has ridden 3,049 winners, including 25 in Group One races. He won seven of his Group Ones on Weekend Hussler, starting with the October 2007 Caulfield Guineas and finishing with the September 2008 Underwood Stakes. He was the leading jockey in Australia in the 2013-14 racing season, with 157 winners.
