= VRC Stakes day =

Horse racing event in Melbourne, Australia

The VRC Stakes day (also known as the Seppelt Wines Stakes Day), is the final day of the Melbourne Spring Racing Carnival at Flemington Racecourse. Stakes Day is held on the Saturday directly following Melbourne Cup Day (the first Tuesday in November). The 'Stakes' were first run in 1881 as the Coburg Stakes. In 2016 the LKS Mackinnon Stakes was moved from the VRC Victoria Derby day and renamed to the Emirate Stakes. The original "Stakes" were in turn moved to the first day of the carnival and renamed as the Longines Mile.

Stakes Day is also known as Family Day of the Melbourne Spring Racing Carnival, with extra events aimed at children and families scheduled throughout the day. A popular event introduced from 2004 is the Stakes Day' Fashions on the Field, giving youngsters and families the opportunities to impress at the track alongside their adult counterparts. Stakes Day is one of the fastest growing events on the Australian racing calendar, and is popular with crowds because of its relaxed and casual atmosphere.

Seppelt Wines Stakes Day features a nine race card, of which five are group races. The feature race of the day is the Group 1 Seppelt Wines Stakes, a WFA run over 2000 metres. The 1200m Darley Classic (won by Black Caviar in 2010 and 2011) is also held on this day.

== Attendance history ==
- 2006 - 78,151
- 2005 - 61,382

== See also ==
- Australian horse-racing
- Melbourne Spring Racing Carnival
