= Weekend Hussler =

Australian-bred Thoroughbred racehorse

- Sire: Hussonet
- Grandsire: Mr. Prospector
- Dam: Weekend Beauty
- Damsire: Helissio
- Sex: Gelding
- Foaled: 2004
- Country: Australia
- Colour: Bay
- Breeder: Arrowfield Stud
- Owner: Ms J Kewish, J Bath, Stoneworkz Racing Syn, S Rush, W Stewart, G O'Donoghue, L O'Connell, P Troedel, Ms J Stosius & M Moloney
- Trainer: Ross McDonald
- Jockey: Luke Nolen/Chris Symons/Danny Nikolic/Brad Rawiller
- Record: 21:12-1-0
- Earnings: A$3,096,400

Major wins
- MRC Caulfield Guineas Gr 1 (2007); VRC Ascot Vale Stakes Gr 1 (2007); MRC Oakleigh Plate Gr 1 (2008); VRC Newmarket Handicap Gr 1 (2008); AJC Randwick Guineas Gr 1 (2008); STC George Ryder Stakes Gr 1 (2008); MRC Memsie Stakes Gr 2 (2008); VRC Makybe Diva Stakes Gr 2 (2008); MRC Underwood Stakes Gr 1 (2008)

Awards
- Australian Champion Racehorse of the Year (2008); Australian Champion Three Year Old C&G (2008)
- Last updated on 8 October 2010

Weekend Hussler is a retired Australian Thoroughbred racehorse. He is a bay gelding by Hussonet out of Weekend Beauty (by Helissio). He was foaled in 2004. Hussonet had been a very successful sire in Chile for Haras de Pirque where he stood for the largest fee of any stallion in the history of Chilean Thoroughbred breeding.

Weekend Hussler won 9 of his 11 starts at three, including Group One wins in the Caulfield Guineas, Ascot Vale Stakes, Oakleigh Plate, Newmarket Handicap, Randwick Guineas and George Ryder Stakes. In winning six Group One wins he equalled Kingston Town's Australian record for most in a single season. Weekend Hussler was named the 2007/2008 Australian Horse of the Year.

His first start as a four-year-old resulted in a second placing to the unbeaten Group One winner Light Fantastic in the J J Liston Stakes. Two weeks later he backed it up with his first win in the 2008–09 season by winning the Memsie Stakes at Caulfield Racecourse, defeating Maldivian and Pompeii Ruler. A week later in the Makybe Diva Stakes (formerly the Craiglee Stakes) he won again, by 2½ lengths over Zarita and Littorio. In that event Light Fantastic suffered his first defeat to run fourth. Two weeks later, Weekend Hussler won his seventh Group One when victorious in the Underwood Stakes at Caulfield over 1,800 metres, his first race past 1,600 metres. Two weeks later, he finished eighth in the Turnbull Stakes at Flemington Racecourse in his first attempt at 2,000 metres. Weekend Hussler then finished twelfth behind the British racehorse All The Good in the Caulfield Cup. His first run as an autumn four-year-old resulted in a fourth in the Lightning Stakes, his second run resulted in a fifth in the Australia Stakes. Injury concerns curtailed his four-year-old campaign and kept him out of racing during the spring as a five-year-old.

He returned to racing in February 2010 in the Oakleigh Plate, where he finished back in the field under the top-weight. Another injury (a torn off synovial pad from his off fore fetlock joint) was found after that race, and he was to miss the rest of the autumn. He returned to racing in October 2010 with a 10th placing in the Gilgai Stakes at Flemington; however, his retirement was announced shortly after.

== Race record ==
2007–08 season as a three-year-old
| Result | Date | Race | Venue | Group | Distance | Weight (kg) | Time | Jockey | Winner/2nd |
|---|---|---|---|---|---|---|---|---|---|
| 4th | 19 Aug 2007 | 3yo Maiden | Sale | NA | 1208m | 57.0 | 1:12.89 | Luke Nolen | 1st - Aceland Street |
| Won | 2 Sep 2007 | 3yo Maiden | Cranbourne | NA | 1200m | 57.0 | 1:11.65 | C. Symons | 2nd - Embracing |
| Won | 19 Sep 2007 | 3yo Rst72 | Sandown | NA | 1300m | 57.0 | 1:15.94 | Brad Rawiller | 2nd - Simplest |
| Won | 30 Sep 2007 | 3yo Open | Sandown | NA | 1400m | 57.0 | 1:24.23 | B. Rawiller | 2nd - Viatorian |
| Won | 13 Oct 2007 | Caulfield Guineas | Caulfield | G1 | 1600m | 55.5 | 1:36.42 | B. Rawiller | 2nd - Scenic Blast |
| Won | 3 Nov 2007 | Ascot Vale Stakes | Flemington | G1 | 1200m | 55.5 | 1:08.95 | B. Rawiller | 2nd - Bel Mer |
| 10th | 10 Nov 2007 | Emirates Stakes | Flemington | G1 | 1600m | 51.5 | 1:35.98 | Danny Nikolic | 1st - Tears I Cry |
| Won | 23 Feb 2008 | Oakleigh Plate | Caulfield | G1 | 1100m | 53.0 | 1:03.22 | B. Rawiller | 2nd - Magnus |
| Won | 8 Mar 2008 | Newmarket Handicap | Flemington | G1 | 1200m | 56.0 | 1:08.97 | B. Rawiller | 2nd - Magnus |
| Won | 29 Mar 2008 | Randwick Guineas | Randwick | G1 | 1600m | 56.5 | 1:36.30 | B. Rawiller | 2nd - Triple Honour |
| Won | 19 Apr 2008 | George Ryder Stakes | Rosehill | G1 | 1500m | 56.5 | 1:31.72 | B. Rawiller | 2nd - Racing to Win |

2008–09 season as a four-year-old
| Result | Date | Race | Venue | Group | Distance | Weight (kg) | Time | Jockey | Winner/2nd |
|---|---|---|---|---|---|---|---|---|---|
| 2nd | 16 Aug 2008 | J J Liston Stakes | Caulfield | G2 | 1400m | 58.5 | 1:24.83 | B.Rawiller | 1st - Light Fantastic |
| Won | 30 Aug 2008 | Memsie Stakes | Caulfield | G2 | 1400m | 58.5 | 1:23.27 | B. Rawiller | 2nd - Maldivian |
| Won | 6 Sep 2008 | Craiglee Stakes | Flemington | G2 | 1600m | 58.5 | 1:38.60 | B.Rawiller | 2nd - Zarita |
| Won | 20 Sep 2008 | Underwood Stakes | Caulfield | G1 | 1800m | 58.0 | 1:49.68 | B.Rawiller | 2nd - Pompeii Ruler |
| 8th | 4 Oct 2008 | Turnbull Stakes | Flemington | G1 | 2000m | 57.5 | 2:02.44 | B.Rawiller | 1st - Littorio |
| 12th | 18 Oct 2008 | Caulfield Cup | Caulfield | G1 | 2400m | 57.0 | 2:27.45 | B.Rawiller | 1st - All The Good |
| 4th | 31 Jan 2009 | Lightning Stakes | Flemington | G1 | 1000m | 58.5 | 0:56.94 | B.Rawiller | 1st - Scenic Blast |
| 5th | 14 Feb 2009 | Australia Stakes | Moonee Valley | G1 | 1200m | 58.5 | 1:09.60 | B.Rawiller | 1st - Apache Cat |

2009–10 season as a five-year-old
| Result | Date | Race | Venue | Group | Distance | Weight (kg) | Time | Jockey | Winner/2nd |
|---|---|---|---|---|---|---|---|---|---|
| 11th | 20 Feb 2010 | Oakleigh Plate | Caulfield | G1 | 1100m | 58.5 | 1:03.16 | B.Rawiller | 1st - Starspangledbanner |

2010–11 season as a six-year-old
| Result | Date | Race | Venue | Group | Distance | Weight (kg) | Time | Jockey | Winner/2nd |
|---|---|---|---|---|---|---|---|---|---|
| 10th | 3 Oct 2010 | Gilgai Stakes | Flemington | G2 | 1200m | 58.0 | 1:08.20 | Glen Boss | 1st - Hay List |

== Pedigree ==
Pedigree of Weekend Hussler (Aus)
| Sire Hussonet (USA) ch. 1991 | Mr. Prospector (USA) b. 1970 | Raise A Native (USA) ch. 1961 | Native Dancer (USA) |
| Sire Hussonet (USA) ch. 1991 | Mr. Prospector (USA) b. 1970 | Raise A Native (USA) ch. 1961 | Raise You (USA) |
| Sire Hussonet (USA) ch. 1991 | Mr. Prospector (USA) b. 1970 | Gold Digger (USA) b. 1962 | Nashua (USA) |
| Sire Hussonet (USA) ch. 1991 | Mr. Prospector (USA) b. 1970 | Gold Digger (USA) b. 1962 | Sequence (USA) |
| Sire Hussonet (USA) ch. 1991 | Sacahuista (USA) ch. 1984 | Raja Baba (USA) b. 1968 | Bold Ruler (USA) |
| Sire Hussonet (USA) ch. 1991 | Sacahuista (USA) ch. 1984 | Raja Baba (USA) b. 1968 | Missy Baba (USA) |
| Sire Hussonet (USA) ch. 1991 | Sacahuista (USA) ch. 1984 | Nalees Flying Flag (USA) b. 1975 | Hoist The Flag (USA) |
| Sire Hussonet (USA) ch. 1991 | Sacahuista (USA) ch. 1984 | Nalees Flying Flag (USA) b. 1975 | Nalee (USA) |
| Dam Weekend Beauty (Aus) b. 1999 | Helissio (Fr) b. 1993 | Fairy King (USA) b. 1982 | Northern Dancer (Can) |
| Dam Weekend Beauty (Aus) b. 1999 | Helissio (Fr) b. 1993 | Fairy King (USA) b. 1982 | Fairy Bridge (USA) |
| Dam Weekend Beauty (Aus) b. 1999 | Helissio (Fr) b. 1993 | Helice (USA) b. 1988 | Slewpy (USA) |
| Dam Weekend Beauty (Aus) b. 1999 | Helissio (Fr) b. 1993 | Helice (USA) b. 1988 | Hirondelle (USA) |
| Dam Weekend Beauty (Aus) b. 1999 | Not on Friday (Aus) b. 1992 | At Talaq (USA) b. 1981 | Roberto (USA) |
| Dam Weekend Beauty (Aus) b. 1999 | Not on Friday (Aus) b. 1992 | At Talaq (USA) b. 1981 | My Nord (USA) |
| Dam Weekend Beauty (Aus) b. 1999 | Not on Friday (Aus) b. 1992 | Market Heights (NZ) b. 1986 | Grosvenor (NZ) |
| Dam Weekend Beauty (Aus) b. 1999 | Not on Friday (Aus) b. 1992 | Market Heights (NZ) b. 1986 | Malarus (NZ) |
