= Mohammed bin Khalifa Al Maktoum =

Mohammed bin Khalifa bin Saeed Al Maktoum
- Sheikh
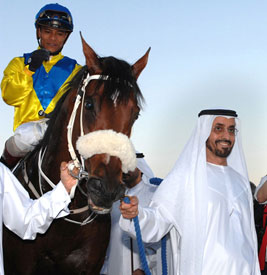
- Sheikh Mohammed bin Khalifa Al Maktoum holding his horse, 2007 UAE triple crown winner Asiatic Boy
- Born: 1942 (age 83–84)
- Issue: Saeed; Alia; Maitha
Names
- Sheikh Mohammed bin Khalifa bin Saeed bin Maktoum bin Hasher bin Maktoum bin Butti bin Suhail Al Maktoum
- House: Al Maktoum
- Father: Khalifa bin Saeed Al Maktoum
- Mother: Sana bint Mana bin Rashid Al Maktoum
- Religion: Sunni Islam

Sheikh Mohammed bin Khalifa bin Saeed Al Maktoum (born 1942) is an Emirati politician and royalty of Dubai.

Sheikh Mohammed is the first cousin of the current Ruler of Dubai, Sheikh Mohammed bin Rashid Al Maktoum, and the head of the Dubai Land Department, the land registrar of the Emirate of Dubai.

He was educated at the Bell Educational Trust's English Language School, Cambridge.

He was appointed in 1971 (the establishment of UAE) by his first cousin, the Emir (ruler) of Dubai, Maktoum bin Rashid Al Maktoum. Emir Maktoum himself was the first chairman since 1960.

The Sheikh owns thoroughbred racehorses, including the 2007 UAE triple crown winner Asiatic Boy.
