= Efficient (horse) =

New Zealand-bred Thoroughbred racehorse

- Sire: Zabeel
- Grandsire: Sir Tristram
- Dam: Refused the Dance
- Damsire: Defensive Play (USA)
- Sex: Gelding
- Foaled: 23 August 2003
- Country: New Zealand
- Colour: Grey
- Breeder: Bloodstock Resources Ltd and Cambridge Hunt Ltd
- Owner: Lloyd J. Williams et al.
- Trainer: Graeme Rogerson, John D Sadler
- Record: 29:7–1–0
- Earnings: A$4,788,525

Major wins
- Victoria Derby (2006); Melbourne Cup (2007); Turnbull Stakes (2009)

Awards
- Australian Champion Stayer (2007/08)
- Last updated on 4 October 2012

Efficient (foaled 23 August 2003) is a grey Thoroughbred racehorse gelding, bred in New Zealand, who won the 2007 Melbourne Cup and the 2006 Victoria Derby, both times ridden by Michael Rodd.

Efficient was by the sire Zabeel from the mare Refused The Dance by Defensive Play (USA). He is a half brother to Guillotine, winner of the 2008 MVRC Dato Tan Chin Nam Stakes.

In his first campaign in the spring of 2006 he put together five consecutive wins including the Group 2 Aami Vase at Moonee Valley and ending with a win in the VRC Derby by 2½ lengths. Following his Derby win, Efficient was entered into the Melbourne Cup field, run three days later. However, he did not pull up well enough and so was scratched from the race and spelled instead.

Returning in the autumn, Efficient had a very light campaign of just two starts. In the 1,400-metre Group 3 Schweppervescence Cup he finished fourth behind Haradasun and fifth behind Miss Finland in the Group One Australian Guineas over 1,600 metres.

As a four-year-old in the Spring of 2007, Efficient resumed in the Memsie Stakes at Caulfield and ran 10th beaten 7 lengths. At his next start he ran fourth in the Group 2 Dato Tan Chin Nam Stakes behind El Segundo and Haradasun. He then ran unplaced in the 2,000-metre Group 1 Turnbull Stakes. Three weeks later Efficient lined up in the Weight for Age Group 1 Cox Plate over 2,040 metres at Moonee Valley where he finished 9th beaten 6½ lengths by the winner El Segundo. Efficient's next start was the Melbourne Cup, his first start in a handicap race since his first campaign. He dropped 3 kg from the Cox Plate run to carry 54.5 kg. Due to his poor recent form he was sent out a 16-1 chance. Reunited with jockey Michael Rodd for the first time since their 2006 Victoria Derby win, Efficient settled back in the field and travelled well. He was pulled to the outside to make a run and in the closing stages Efficient went on to defeat Purple Moon by half a length.

His win dividend of $22.70 was the greatest for a Melbourne Cup winner in thirteen years since Jeune in the 1994 Melbourne Cup. He became the first grey to win the Melbourne Cup since Subzero in the 1992 Melbourne Cup, and the first horse since Phar Lap to win the 1930 Melbourne Cup, the year after winning the 1929 Victoria Derby.

Efficient was trained by expatriate New Zealand trainer Graeme Rogerson to win the cup, but was switched to John Sadler soon after Rogerson decided to part company with the horse's owners, a syndicate headed by Lloyd and Suzy Williams.

Efficient has had an injury-plagued career since his Melbourne Cup win, and was withdrawn from both the 2008 and 2009 Melbourne Cups in the fortnight leading up to the race. However, he did gain a third Group One success in the 2009 Turnbull Stakes. After this success, Efficient did not race for almost two years.

He returned to racing in September 2011, but did not show any form until he ran second to Niwot in the 3200 metre Sydney Cup at Randwick in April 2012. On 4 October 2012, Efficient's owner Lloyd Williams, announced that the horse had suffered a recurrence of an old injury and had been retired. He now resides with other former champion horses at Living Legends, the International Home of Rest for Champion Horses located in Woodlands Historic Park, Greenvale, Victoria, Australia. He occasionally makes public appearances at events such as the Melbourne Cup Parade.

== See also ==
- List of Melbourne Cup winners
