= C S Hayes Stakes =

Horse race in Melbourne, Australia

- Class: Group 3
- Location: Flemington Racecourse
- Race type: Thoroughbred

Race information
- Distance: 1,400 metres
- Surface: Turf
- Qualification: Three-year-old colts and geldings
- Weight: Set weights with penalties
- Purse: $200,000 (2026)

The C S Hayes Stakes is a Victoria Racing Club Group 3 Thoroughbred horse race for three-year-old colts and geldings, at set weights with penalties, over a distance of 1400 metres. It is held annually at Flemington Racecourse in Melbourne, Australia, in February.

== History ==
The race was named in honour of champion trainer Colin Hayes (1924–1999).

=== Distance ===
- 1987–1989 - 1400 metres
- 1990 - 1200 metres
- 1991–1993 - 1400 metres
- 1994 - 1420 metres
- 1995 - 1432 metres
- 1996 - 1433 metres
- 1997 - 1400 metres
- 1998 - 1414 metres
- 1999–2000 - 1409 metres
- 2001–2002 - 1400 metres
- 2003 - 1420 metres
- 2004 - 1410 metres
- 2005–2006 - 1400 metres
- 2007 - 1200 metres
- 2008–2011 - 1400 metres
- 2012 - 1410 metres
- 2013 onwards - 1400 metres

=== Name ===
- 1987–1993 - The Debonair
- 1994 - Vanuatu Stakes
- 1995–2007 - The Debonair
- 2008 onwards - C S Hayes Stakes

=== Venue ===
- 1997 - Sandown Racecourse
- 2007 - Moonee Valley Racecourse
- Generally - Flemington Racecourse

== Winners ==
The following are past winners of the race.

- 2026 - Sixties
- 2025 – Sepals
- 2024 – Riff Rocket
- 2023 – Elliptical
- 2022 – Pinstriped
- 2021 – Tagaloa
- 2020 – Alligator Blood
- 2019 – The Inevitable
- 2018 – Grunt
- 2017 – Hey Doc
- 2016 – Tivaci (Note: In 2016 Palentino crossed the finish line first, but was relegated to second place due to interference.)
- 2015 – Wandjina
- 2014 – Hucklebuck
- 2013 – Sheer Talent
- 2012 – That The One
- 2011 – Bullbars
- 2010 – Take The Rap
- 2009 – Fair Trade
- 2008 – Playwright
- 2007 – Wordsmith
- 2006 – Minson
- 2005 – Lieutenant
- 2004 – Starcraft
- 2003 – Innovation Girl
- 2002 – Dash For Cash
- 2001 – Kosta Zoff
- 2000 – Crawl
- 1999 – Mossman
- 1998 – Encounter
- 1997 – Mouawad
- 1996 – El Qahiras Son
- 1995 – Rullene
- 1994 – Mahogany
- 1993 – McBrave
- 1992 – Coolong Road
- 1991 – The Strategist
- 1990 – Zabeel
- 1989 – Tin Woodman
- 1988 – Spacecraft
- 1987 – Raveneaux

== See also ==
- List of Australian Group races
- Group races
