= Al Shindagha Sprint =

- Class: Group 3
- Location: Meydan Racecourse; Dubai, United Arab Emirates
- Inaugurated: 2009
- Race type: Thoroughbred - Flat racing

Race information
- Distance: 1,200 metres
- Surface: Dirt
- Track: Straight
- Qualification: 3-y-o+
- Purse: $200,000

The Al Shindagha Sprint, is a horse race for horses aged three and over, run at a distance of 1,200 metres (six furlongs) on dirt in late January or early February at Meydan Racecourse in Dubai. The race is named after Al Shindagha, a district in the city of Dubai.

The Al Shindagha Sprint was first contested in 2000 on dirt at Nad Al Sheba Racecourse. It was moved to Meydan in 2010 where it was run on a synthetic Tapeta surface until reverting to dirt in 2015.

== Records ==
Record time:

- 1:10.11 - Tropical Star 2007

Most successful horse:

- no horse has won the race more than once

Most wins by a jockey:

- 4 - Pat Dobbs 2017, 2018, 2019, 2021

Most wins by a trainer:

- 4 - Doug Watson 2017, 2018, 2019, 2021

Most wins by an owner:

- 3 - Rashid bin Mohammed 2003, 2005

== Winners ==
Year	Winner	Age	Jockey	Trainer	Owner	Time
2000	Snow Kid	6	Neil Pollard	Paddy Rudkin	Ali Saeed Bilhab	1:11.80
2001	Mutamayyaz	5	Richard Hills	Paddy Rudkin	Hamdan Al Maktoum	1:12.96
2002	Glad Master	5	Craig Williams	John D Sadler	Maktoum bin Mohammed Al Maktoum	1:12.26
2003	Feet So Fast	4	Ted Durcan	Satish Seemar	Rashid bin Mohammed	1:11.90
2004	National Currency	5	Weichong Marwing	Michael Azzie	Mr & Mrs G J Beck	1:10.12
2005	Estimraar	8	Richard Mullen	Mazin Al Kurdi	Rashid bin Mohammed	1:10.88
2006	Heart Alone	4	Mick Kinane	Antonio Cintra Pereira	C & T	1:10.17
2007	Tropical Star	7	Royston Ffrench	Ali Rashid Al Rayhi	Mohammed bin Maktoum Al Maktoum	1:10.11
2008	Asiatic Boy	4	Johnny Murtagh	Mike de Kock	Mohammed bin Khalifa Al Maktoum	1:11.27
2009	Big City Man	4	Jose Verenzuela	Jerry Barton	Sultan Mohammed Saud Al Kabeer	1:10.31
2010	War Artist	6	Olivier Peslier	James Eustace	Rupert Plersch	1:10.74
2011	Dynamic Blitz	6	Olivier Doleuze	Ricky Yiu	Lam Yin Kee	1:10.47
2012	Hitchens	7	Silvestre de Sousa	David Barron	Laurence O'Kane & Paul Murphy	1:11.22
2013	Mental	4	Mickael Barzalona	Mahmood Al Zarooni	Godolphin	1:10.59
2014	Russian Soul	6	Shane Foley	Mick Halford	A G Kavanagh	1:10.61
2015	Reynaldothewizard	9	Richard Mullen	Satish Seemar	Zabeel Racing International	1:12.14
2016	Rich Tapestry	8	Gerald Mosse	Michael Chang	Silas Wong, Wong Tak Wai et al	1:10.88
2017	Cool Cowboy	6	Pat Dobbs	Doug Watson	Zaur Sekrekov	1:11.49
2018	My Catch	7	Pat Dobbs	Doug Watson	Valentin Bukhtoyarov & Evgeny Kappushev	1:12.50
2019	Drafted	5	Pat Dobbs	Doug Watson	Misty Hollow Farm	1:12.34
2020	Gladiator King	4	Mickael Barzalona	Satish Seemar	Rashid bin Humaid Al Nuaimi	1:11.41
2021	Al Tariq	5	Pat Dobbs	Doug Watson	Abdulmohsen Al Abdulkareem	1:10.56
2022	Meraas	5	Antonio Fresu	Musabbeh Al Mheiri	Maitha Salem Mohammed Belobaida Alsuwaidi	1:13.08
2023	Tuz	6	Jose da Silva	Bhupat Seemar	Dakki Stable	1:10.72
2024	Mouheeb	6	Tom Marquand	Michael Costa	Sheikh Ahmed Al Maktoum	1:11.31
2025	Tuz	8	Tadhg O'Shea	Bhupat Seemar	Dakki Stable	1:10.43
2026	Drew's Gold	6	William Buick	Bhupat Seemar	RRR Racing	1:11.35

== See also ==
- List of United Arab Emirates horse races
