= Champions Mile (VRC) =

Champions Mile (VRC) registered as the Cantala Stakes
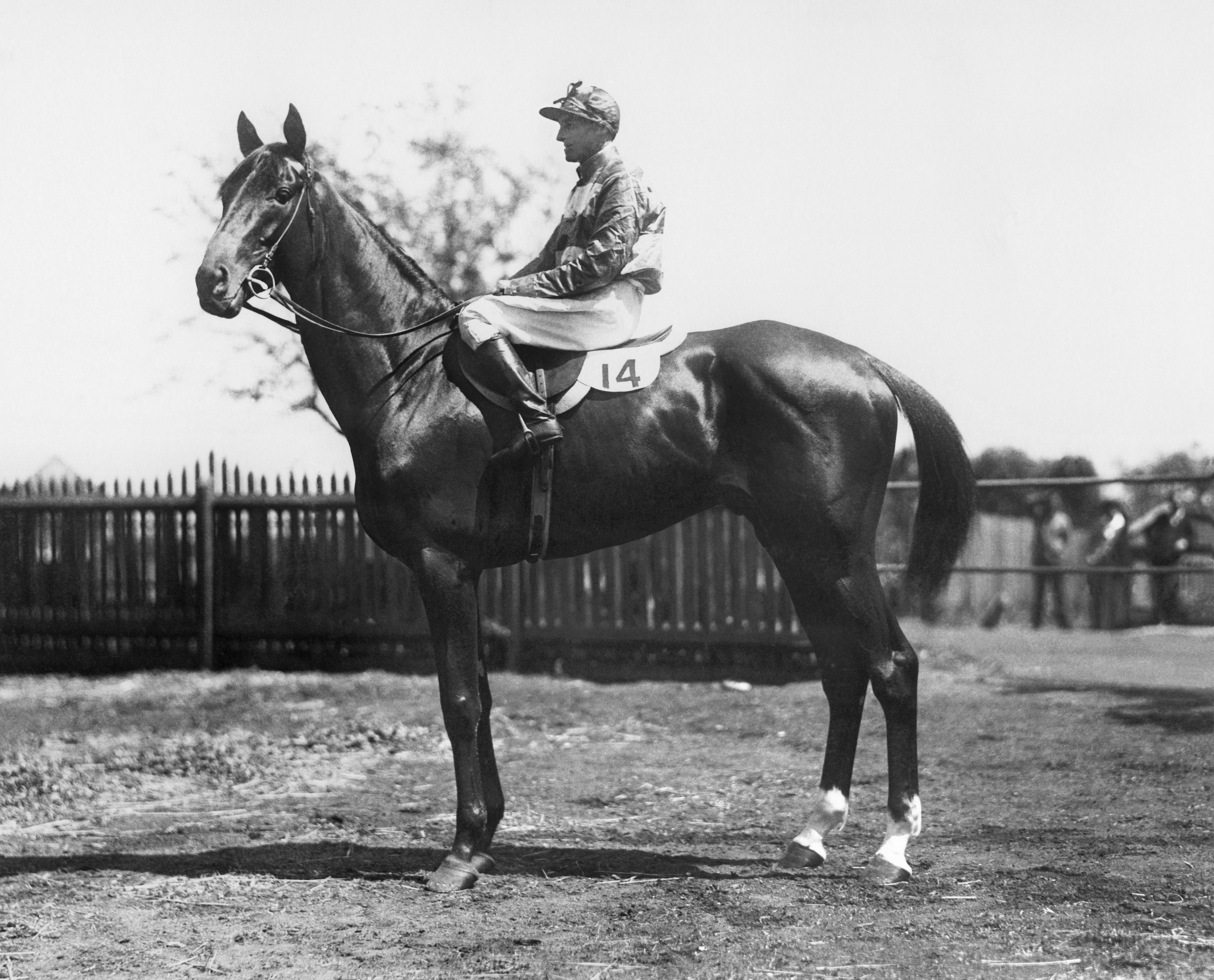
- Denis Boy, 1932 winner
- Class: Group 1
- Location: Flemington Racecourse, Melbourne, Australia
- Inaugurated: 1881
- Race type: Thoroughbred
- Sponsor: Lexus (2025)

Race information
- Distance: 1,600 metres
- Surface: Turf
- Qualification: Three year olds and older that are not maidens
- Weight: Quality handicap
- Purse: $3,000,000 (2026)

The VRC Champions Mile, registered as the Cantala Stakes, is a Group 1 Victoria Racing Club quality handicap Thoroughbred horse race run over 1,600 metres at Flemington Racecourse, Melbourne, Australia on the fourth and last day during the Melbourne Cup Carnival.

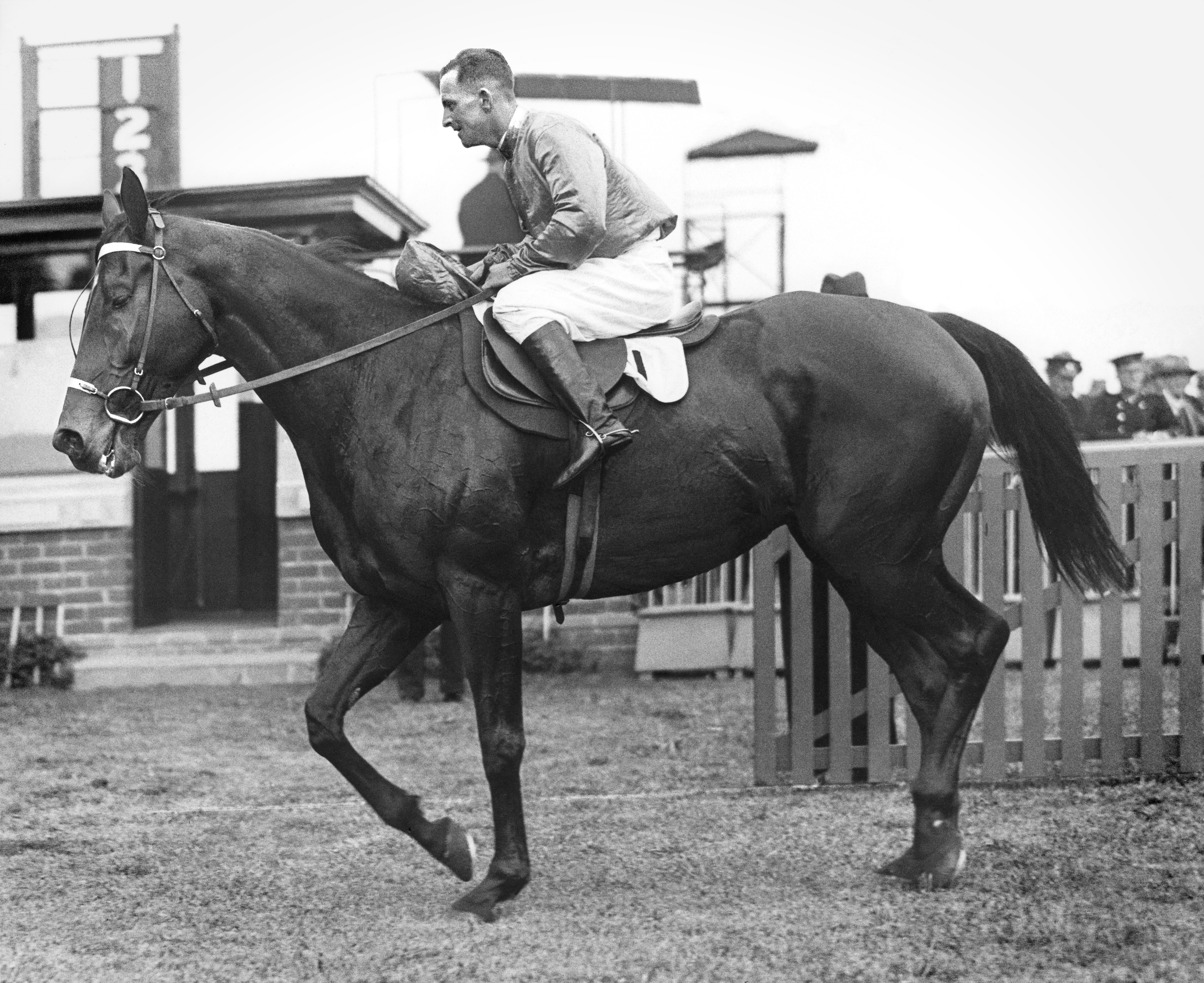
Amounis, 1926 & 1929 winner

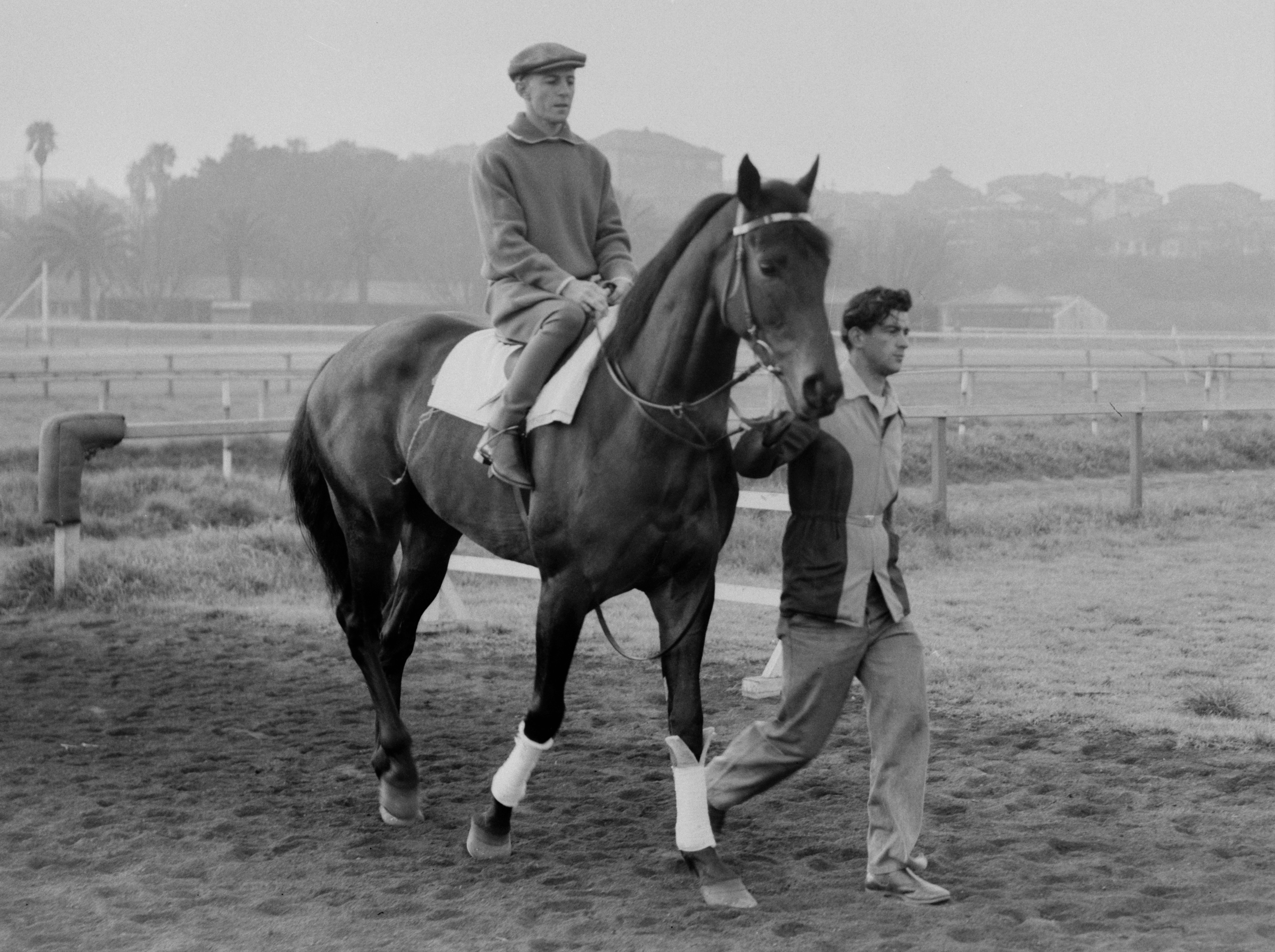
Prince Cortauld, 1954 winner

== History ==
The race was moved in 2016 to the first day of the Melbourne Cup Carnival (Victoria Derby Day) from the last day. This was swapped with the LKS Mackinnon Stakes, which became the feature race on the last day of the carnival. In 2022, the race was returned to the final day of the Melbourne Cup Carnival and renamed the VRC Champions Mile in order to align with the branding of the entire race day, which is now called Champions Day instead of Stakes Day.

=== Name ===
- 1881–1918 - Coburg Stakes
- 1919–1961 - Cantala Stakes
- 1962–1984 - George Adams Handicap
- 1985–1988 - Ampol Stakes
- 1989–1992 - Honda Stakes
- 1993–1995 - Nissan Stakes
- 1996–1997 - Chrysler Stakes
- 1998–2015 - Emirates Stakes
- 2016 - Cantala Stakes
- 2017–2018 - Kennedy Mile
- 2019–2021 - Kennedy Cantala Stakes
- 2022–2023 - Kennedy Champions Mile
- 2024 - VRC Champions Mile
- 2025 - Lexus Champions Mile
- 2026 - VRC Champions Mile

=== Distance ===
- 1881–1894 - 1 1/8 miles (~1800 metres)
- 1895–1971 - 1 mile (~1600 metres)
- 1972–1993 – 1600 metres
- 1994 – 1616 metres
- 1995–2005 – 1600 metres
- 2006 – 1610 metres
- 2007 onwards - 1600 metres

=== Grade ===
- 1881–1978 - Principal Race
- 1979 onwards - Group 1

=== 1953 and 1954 racebooks ===
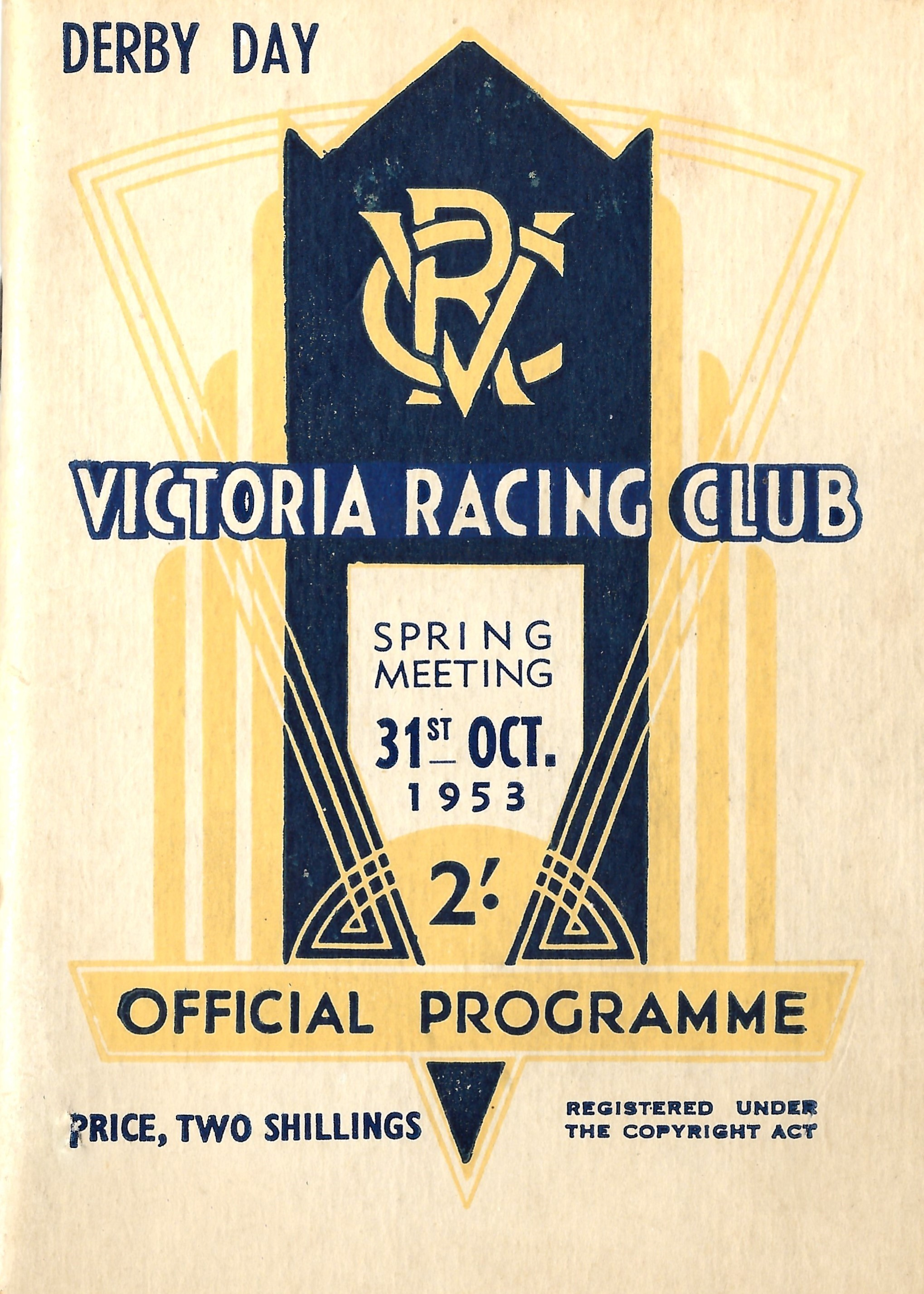
1953 VRC Derby racebook front cover

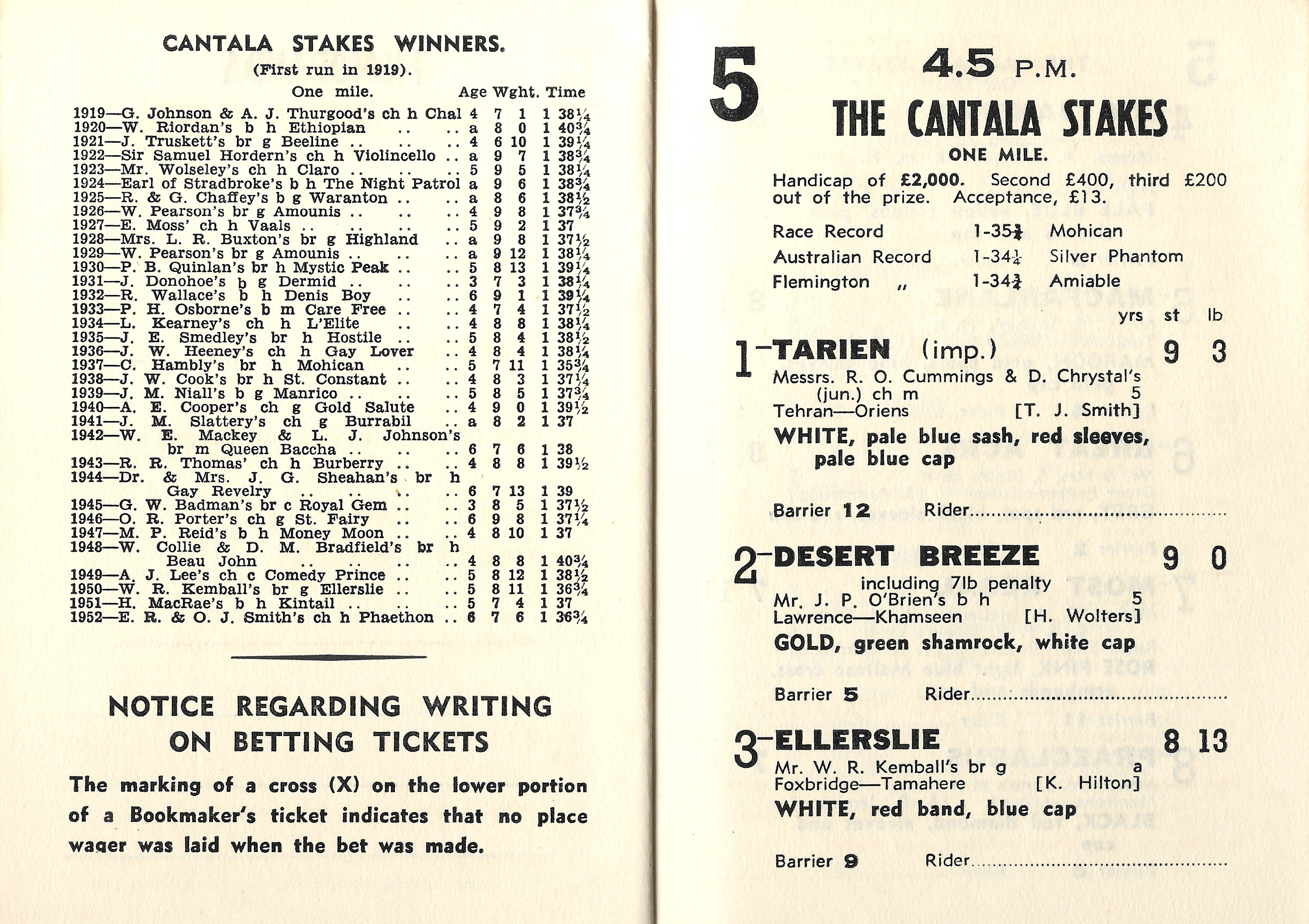
1953 VRC Cantala Stakes page showing starters and results

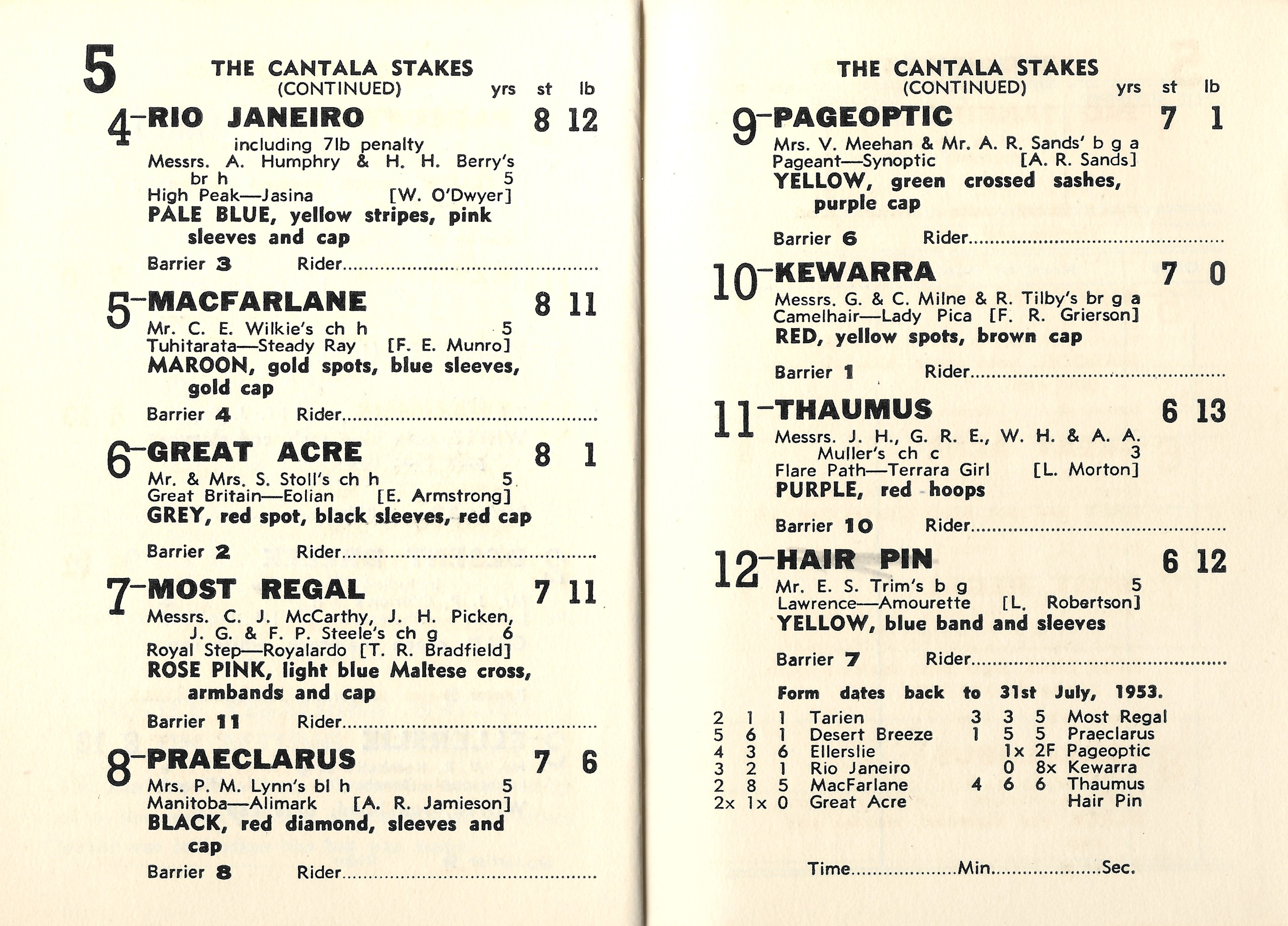
1953 VRC Cantala Stakes page showing the winner, Rio Janeiro

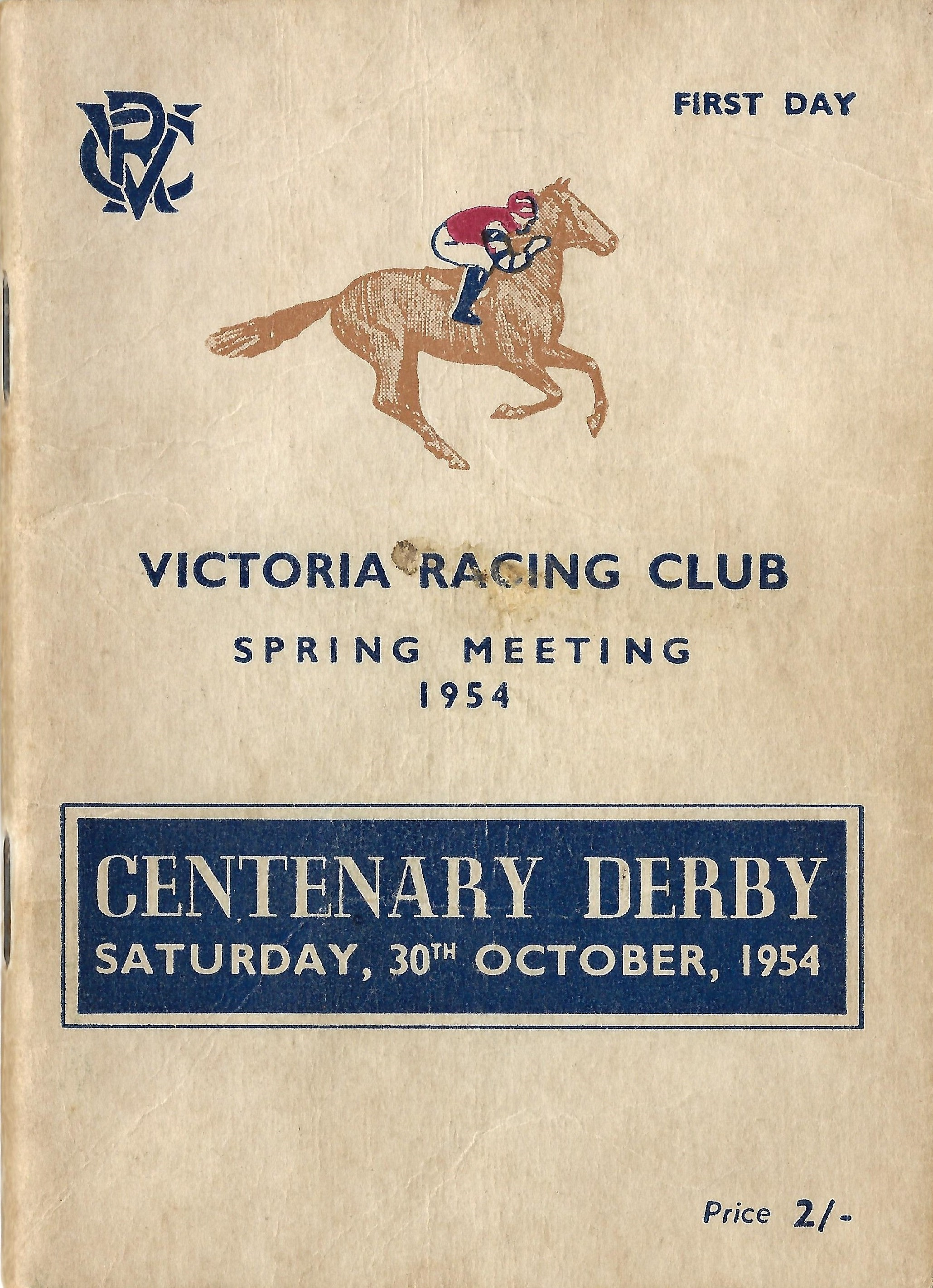
1954 VRC Derby racebook front cover

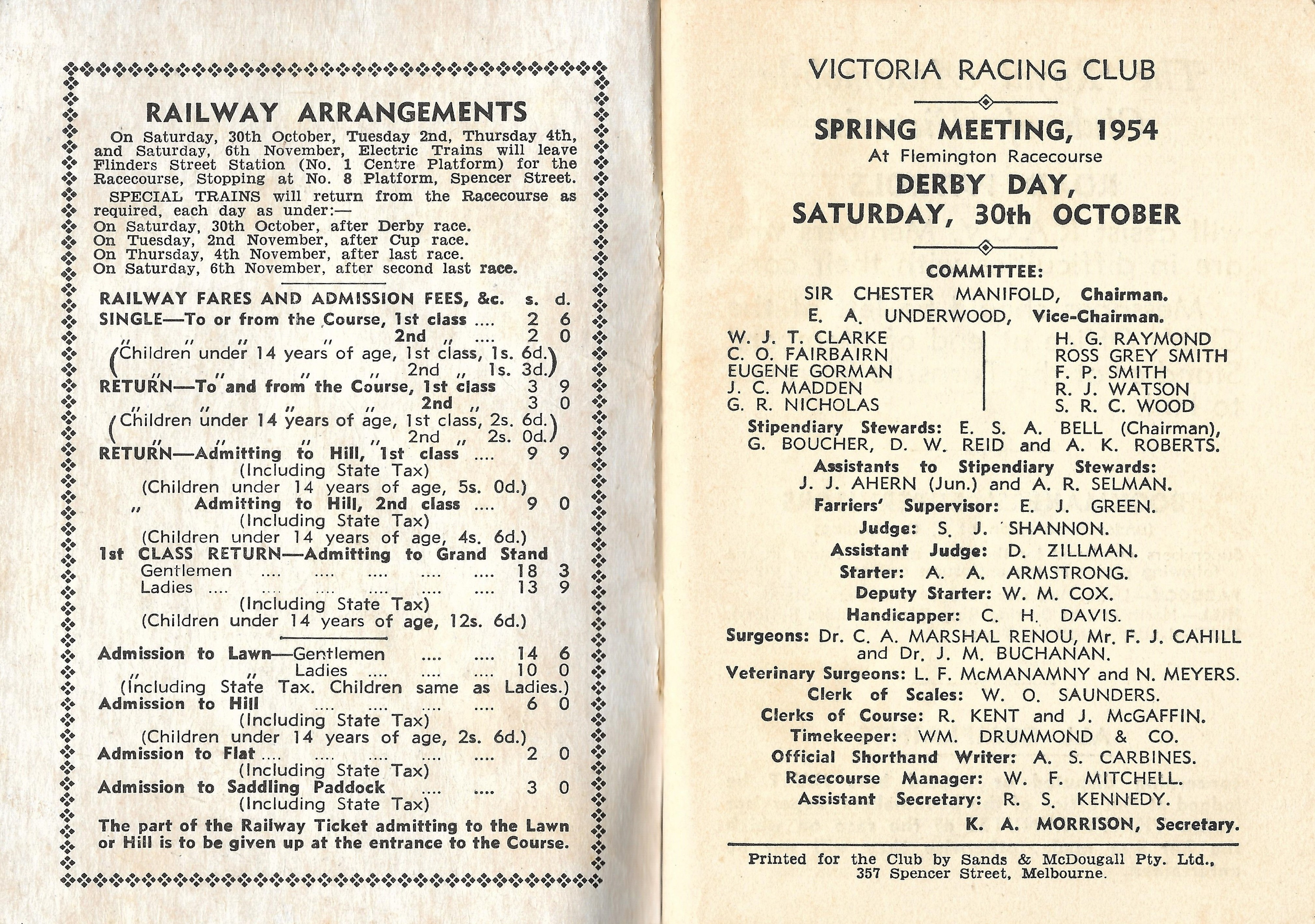
1954 VRC Derby raceday officials

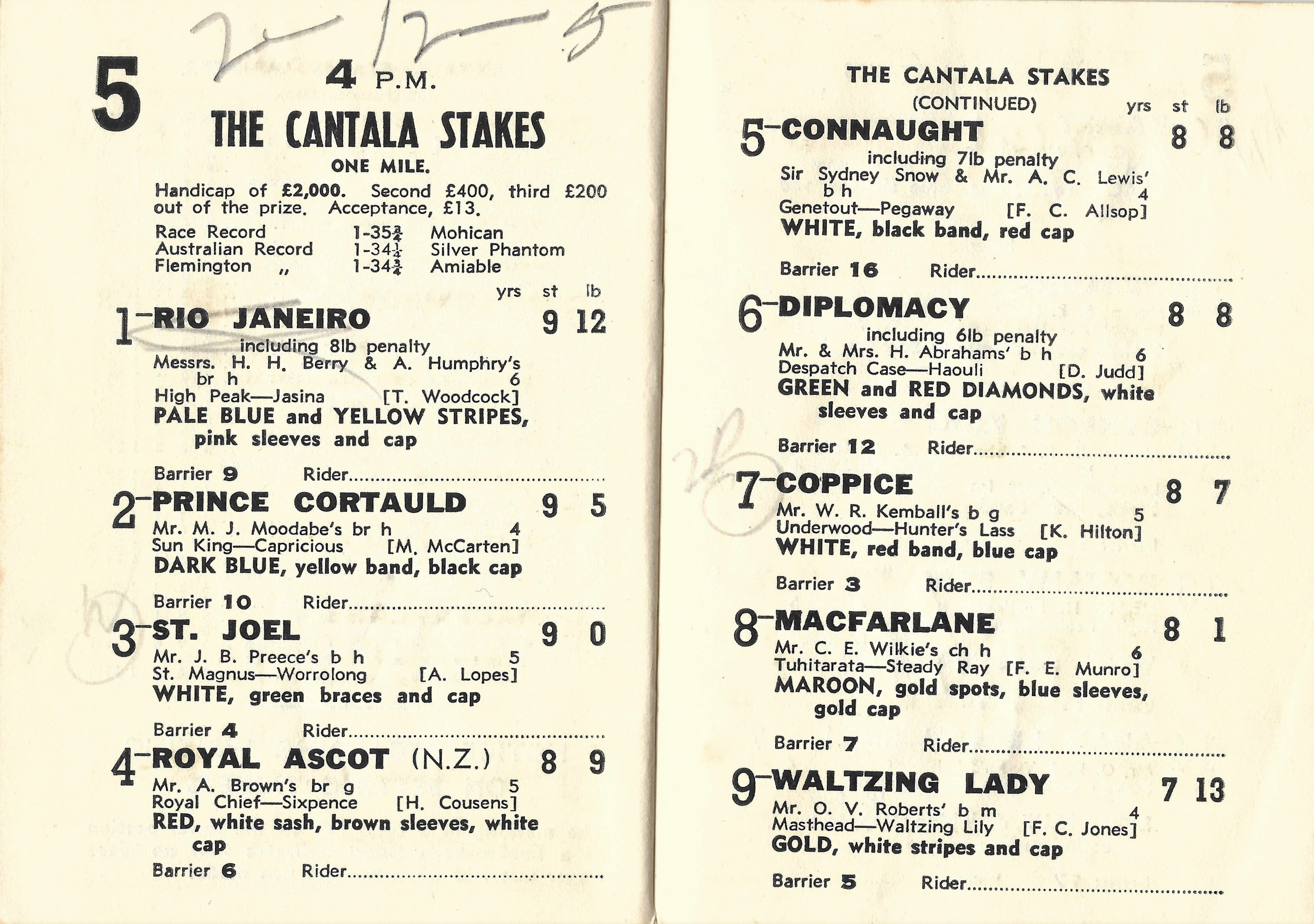
1954 VRC Cantala Stakes showing winner, Prince Cortauld

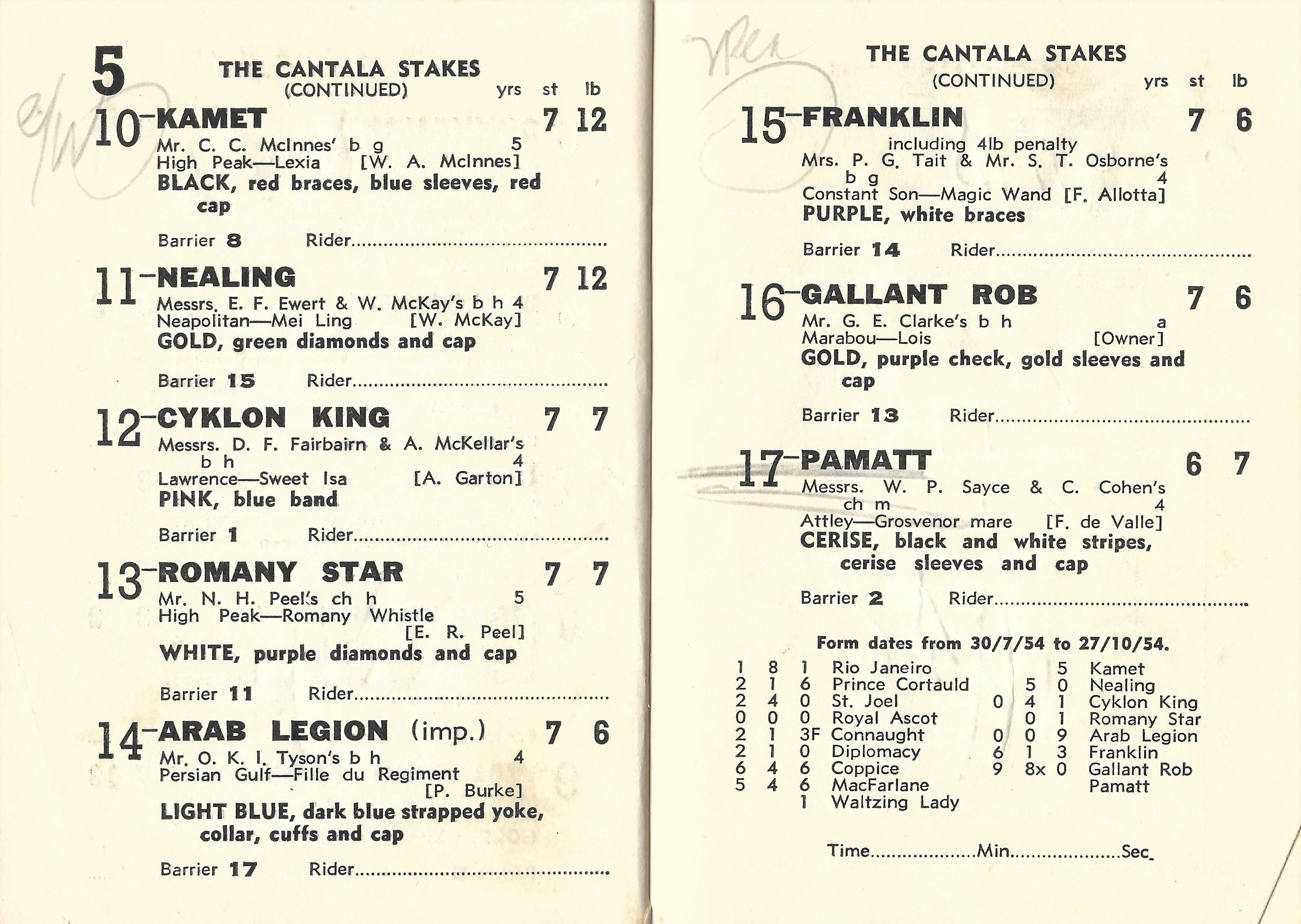
1954 VRC Cantala Stakes starters and results

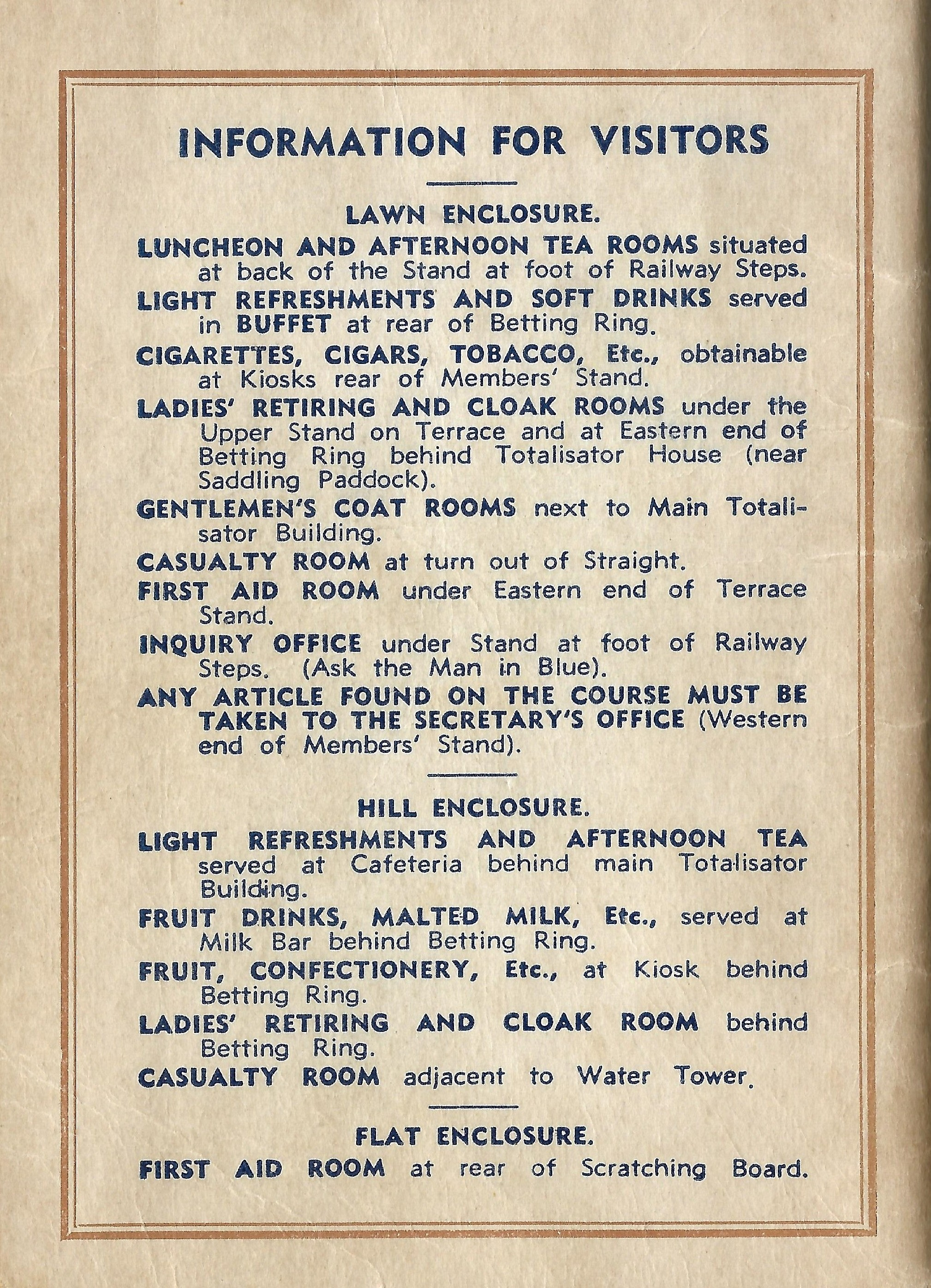
Back Cover showing enclosure information for visitors

== Winners ==
The following are past winners of the race.

- 2026 - Autumn Glory
- 2025 – Ceolwulf
- 2024 – Mr Brightside
- 2023 – Pride Of Jenni
- 2022 – Alligator Blood
- 2021 – Superstorm
- 2020 – Yulong Prince
- 2019 – Fierce Impact
- 2018 – Best Of Days
- 2017 – Shillelagh
- 2016 – Le Romain
- 2015 – Turn Me Loose
- 2014 – Hucklebuck
- 2013 – Boban
- 2012 – Happy Trails
- 2011 – Albert The Fat
- 2010 – Wall Street
- 2009 – All American
- 2008 – All Silent
- 2007 – Tears I Cry
- 2006 – Divine Madonna
- 2005 – Valedictum
- 2004 – Sky Cuddle
- 2003 – Titanic Jack
- 2002 – Scenic Peak
- 2001 – Desert Eagle
- 2000 – Testa Rossa
- 1999 – Bonanova
- 1998 – Bezeal Bay
- 1997 – Catalan Opening
- 1996 – Miss Margaret
- 1995 – Seascay
- 1994 – Seascay
- 1993 – Primacy
- 1992 – Planet Ruler
- 1991 – Pontormo
- 1990 – Shaftesbury Avenue
- 1989 – Better Loosen Up
- 1988 – Our Westminster
- 1987 – Warned
- 1986 – Chanteclair
- 1985 – Dazzling Duke
- 1984 – Riverdale
- 1983 – Honest Promise
- 1982 – Magari
- 1981 – Tower Belle
- 1980 – Silver Bounty
- 1979 – Bit Of A Skite
- 1978 – Family Of Man
- 1977 – Galway Bay
- 1976 – Maybe Mahal
- 1975 – Kiwi Can
- 1974 – Skyjack
- 1973 – Taj Rossi
- 1972 – All Shot
- 1971 – Gunsynd
- 1970 – Levian
- 1969 – Vain
- 1968 – Cyron
- 1967 – Heroic Stone
- 1966 – Storm Queen
- 1965 – Heroic Stone
- 1964 – Brandy Lad
- 1963 – Wenona Girl
- 1962 – Woambra
- 1961 – Aquanita
- 1960 – Aquanita
- 1959 – Wheat King
- 1958 – Droll Prince
- 1957 – Landy
- 1956 – Matrice
- 1955 – Kosciusko
- 1954 – Prince Cortauld
- 1953 – Rio Janeiro
- 1952 – Phaethon
- 1951 – Kintail
- 1950 – Ellerslie
- 1949 – Comedy Prince
- 1948 – Beau John
- 1947 – Money Moon
- 1946 – St. Fairy
- 1945 – Royal Gem
- 1944 – Gay Revelry
- 1943 – Burberry
- 1942 – Queen Baccha
- 1941 – Burrabil
- 1940 – Gold Salute
- 1939 – Manrico
- 1938 – St. Constant
- 1937 – Mohican
- 1936 – Gay Lover
- 1935 – Hostile
- 1934 – L'elite
- 1933 – Care Free
- 1932 – Denis Boy
- 1931 – Dermid
- 1930 – Mystic Peak
- 1929 – Amounis
- 1928 – Highland
- 1927 – Vaals
- 1926 – Amounis
- 1925 – Waranton
- 1924 – The Night Patrol
- 1923 – Claro
- 1922 – Violoncello
- 1921 – Beeline
- 1920 – Ethiopian
- 1919 – Chal
- 1918 – Fitness
- 1917 – De Gama
- 1916 – Colugo
- 1915 – Fidelio
- 1914 – De Gama
- 1913 – Ireland
- 1912 – Walter Tyrril
- 1911 – Ladies' Man
- 1910 – Perilous
- 1909 – Kerlie
- 1908 – Iolaire
- 1907 – Iolaire
- 1906 – Benbow
- 1905 – Debenture
- 1904 – P.K.
- 1903 – Graft
- 1902 – Kinglock
- 1901 – Caledonia
- 1900 – Nitre
- 1899 – Security
- 1898 – Sailor Boy
- 1897 – The Grafter
- 1896 – Ayrshire
- 1895 – Hindoo
- 1894 – Escapade
- 1893 – Rosebrook
- 1892 – Cooya
- 1891 – Cardoness
- 1890 – Crown Jewel
- 1889 – Boz
- 1888 – Plutarch
- 1887 – Quintin Matsys
- 1886 – Day Star
- 1885 – The Bohemian
- 1884 – Josephine
- 1883 – Paul
- 1882 – Wizard
- 1881 – Courtenay

== See also ==
- Champions Sprint (VRC)
- Champions Stakes
- Matriarch Stakes (VRC)
- Queen Elizabeth Stakes
- List of Australian Group races
- Thoroughbred racing in Australia
- Melbourne Spring Racing Carnival
- VRC Stakes day
- Group races
