= Divine Madonna =

Australian-bred Thoroughbred racehorse

- Sire: Hurricane Sky
- Grandsire: Star Watch (AUS)
- Dam: My Madonna
- Damsire: Prego (IRE)
- Sex: Mare
- Foaled: 8 October 2002
- Country: Australia
- Colour: Brown
- Breeder: Mill Park Stud & Rob Dinham
- Owner: I.P. Kavanagh, D. Thackeray, M.A. Shephard, D.N. Parkinson, J.L. Purdey, J.M. Thompson, J.F. Brady, P. & H. Ryan Racing, Ms M.K.S. Raven Thompson
- Trainer: Mark Kavanagh
- Record: 26: 8-3-4
- Earnings: $2,013,390

Major wins
- 2006 Emirates Stakes; 2007 Queen of the Turf Stakes; 2007 Toorak Handicap; 2007 Myer Classic
- Last updated on 29 August 2011

Divine Madonna (foaled 8 October 2002) is an Australian Thoroughbred racemare. She won four group one (G1) races, the 2006 Emirates Stakes, 2007 Queen of the Turf Stakes, 2007 Toorak Handicap and the 2007 Myer Classic. Divine Madonna had 26 race starts and only finished out of the top five runners twice in her career.

She was a brown mare bred by Mill Park Stud & R. Dinham of South Australia and was sired by Hurricane Sky from My Madonna by Prego (IRE). Hurricane Sky won the VATC Blue Diamond Stakes and AJC All-Aged Stakes and sired 16 stakes-winners that had 32 stakes-wins between them. Divine Madonna was a half-sister to Blessum (VRC Standish Handicap winner).

== Racing career ==
Divine Madonna was trained by Mark Kavanagh.

=== At two years ===
She made her debut as a two-year-old (2yo) in February 2005 at Cheltenham Park Racecourse, South Australia in a race in which she came from last on the home turn to win. She had another start as a (2yo) finishing fourth before she was spelled (rested) for 33 weeks.

=== At three years ===
Divine Madonna had three starts in the spring for a win in the listed MRC Twilight Glow Stakes and two seconds and was then given a 13 weeks spell. During the summer and autumn of 2006 she had six starts for a second and third placing and was again sent for a spell.

=== At four years ===
In the spring of 2006 Divine Madonna had four starts which included a win in the G2 VRC Melbourne Carnival Stakes. In the 2006 Group 1 Emirates Stakes, Divine Madonna defeated Niconero by approximately a ½ length. After a spell she had four starts for a win in the G1 STC Queen of the Turf Stakes, a second in the G1 Coolmore Classic, and a third in the G1 Doncaster Handicap.

=== At five years ===
Divine Madonna had six starts which included wins in the G1 MRC Toorak Handicap and G1 VRC Myer Classic over 1,600 metres.

She had 26 race starts for 8 wins, 3 seconds and 4 thirds and earnings of A$2,013,390 from 2005 to March 2008. Divine Madonna was retired at five due to a back injury and was immediately retired to stud.

== Stud record ==
Below is Divine Madonna's foaling record:

- 2009 La Pieta, bay filly by Redoute's Choice
- 2010 bay colt by Redoute's Choice (AUS)
- 2011 covered by Lonhro (AUS) on 26 October 2010
