= Asiatic Boy =

Argentine-bred Thoroughbred racehorse

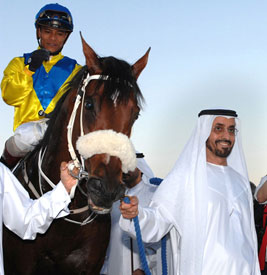
- 2007 UAE triple crown winner Asiatic Boy with his owner Sheikh Mohammed bin Khalifa Al Maktoum
- Sire: Not For Sale
- Grandsire: Parade Marshal
- Dam: S. S. Asiatic
- Damsire: Polish Navy
- Sex: Stallion
- Foaled: 2003
- Country: Argentina
- Colour: Bay
- Breeder: Haras Arroyo de Luna SA
- Owner: Sheikh Mohammed bin Khalifa Al Maktoum
- Trainer: Mike de Kock
- Record: 12: 6-3-1
- Earnings: £849,861 + US$1,200,000

Major wins
- UAE 2000 Guineas (2007); Al Bastakiya Stakes (2007); UAE Derby (2007); Al Shindagha Sprint (2008); Al Maktoum Challenge, Round 3 (2009)

Asiatic Boy (foaled August 26, 2003, in Argentina) is a Thoroughbred racehorse. Bred by Haras Arroyo de Luna SA, he was out of the mare S. S. Asiatic and sired by Argentinian Group One winner Not For Sale. Asiatic Boy's damsire was Kentucky-bred Polish Navy, the sire of 1993 Kentucky Derby winner Sea Hero. Polish Navy was a son of North American Champion sire Danzig.

At age three in 2006, Asiatic Boy raced in Argentina, where he won a maiden race at Hipodromo de San Isidro plus had two second-place finishes. He was purchased by Sheikh Mohammed bin Khalifa Al Maktoum and brought to race at Nad Al Sheba racecourse in his new owner's native Dubai. Under South African trainer Mike de Kock, Asiatic Boy won four straight races between January and March 2007, including a 9½-length victory in the UAE Derby. He did not race again until August when he was sent to compete in the United Kingdom, where he finished fourth in the Sussex Stakes and fifth in the International Stakes.

In 2008, Asiatic Boy won January's Al Shindagha Sprint, then ran third in the Burj Nahaar in early March. In the March 29 Dubai World Cup, he ran second to winner Curlin.
