= Marasco =

Marasco is an Italian surname. Notable people with the surname include:

- Antonio Marasco (born 1970), Italian footballer
- Carmine J. Marasco (1891–1960), American lawyer and politician
- Robert Marasco (1936–1998), American novelist, playwright, and teacher
