= Haradasun =

Australian-bred Thoroughbred racehorse

- Sire: Fusaichi Pegasus (USA)
- Grandsire: Mr. Prospector
- Dam: Circles of Gold
- Damsire: Marscay
- Sex: stallion
- Foaled: 2003
- Country: Australia
- Colour: Brown
- Breeder: Arch of Gold Pty Ltd Syndicate, F Meduri, G Moffitt
- Owner: F Tagg/Susan Magnier/F Meduri/G Moffitt
- Trainer: Tony Vasil; Aidan O'Brien
- Record: 18:7-6-2
- Earnings: A$2,731,170

Major wins
- Vain Stakes (2007); Zeditave Stakes (2007); Doncaster Handicap (2007); George Ryder Stakes (2007); Queen Anne Stakes (2008)

Haradasun (foaled 28 November 2003) was an Australian Thoroughbred racehorse. His most significant wins include the 2007 Group 1 Doncaster Handicap and George Ryder Stakes in Australia and the Queen Anne Stakes in Britain in 2008.

== Background ==
Haradasun is a brown horse sired by Fusaichi Pegasus (USA) from Circles of Gold (AJC Oaks) by Marscay. His sire is a Kentucky Derby winner by champion sire Mr. Prospector. Haradasun is named after the Japanese boxer, 'Fighting Harada'. He was originally trained by Tony Vasil, who also trained his half-brother Elvstroem. He has been ridden by jockeys Glen Boss and Nash Rawiller. His earnings so far are A$2,731,170.

== Racing record ==
Haradasun won his only two-year-old start at Swan Hill by ten lengths. In his first start as a three-year-old, he impressively won the listed 1,200-metre Vain Stakes at Caulfield in Melbourne. In his next start, he lost to the reigning champion two-year-old, Miss Finland, in the HDF McNeil Quality, again at Caulfield over 1,200 metres. Haradasun looked to be a real contender for the 2006 Melbourne Spring Racing Carnival but his trainer, Tony Vasil, noticed he was slightly lame in one leg after he had cooled down one morning after track work. A series of X-rays were taken of his legs, all showing no problems except for the last one taken. This X-ray revealed a slight crack to a cannon bone and Haradasun was immediately spelled for three months. He made a successful return to racing in 2007 Zeditave Stakes at listed level.

Haradasun, ridden by Nash Rawiller, was defeated by the three-year-old filly Catechuchu in the Schweppes Stakes on Blue Diamond Stakes day at Caulfield in February 2007. In next month, he finished fourth to Miss Finland in the Australian Guineas, won the George Ryder Stakes at Rosehill in Sydney before winning the Group 1 Doncaster Handicap mile at Royal Randwick. He looked on track to win the Queen Elizabeth Stakes, but he was beaten into second place by two lengths by the Gai Waterhouse trained Desert War.

== Coolmore Stud buy-out ==
Coolmore Stud, an international breeding company, bought a half share in Haradasun for $20 million, and they replaced Rawiller with Damien Oliver, for the rest of the 2007 season. After running several minor places, Haradasun finished third in the 2,040m Cox Plate at Moonee Valley on 27 October 2007.

== Racing in 2008 ==
Haradasun won in the Group One Queen Anne Stakes at Royal Ascot on 17 June 2008.

== Race record ==
1st:

- Queen Anne Stakes 1600m (G1) Ascot 2008
- Doncaster Handicap 1600m (G1) Randwick 2007
- George Ryder Stakes 1500m (G1) Rosehill 2007
- Wellington R C Stakes 1400m (Listed) Caulfield 2007
- Vain Stakes 1100m (Listed) Caulfield 2006
- Zedative Stakes 1200m (Listed) Caulfield 2007
- 2YO Handicap 1300m Swan Hill

2nd:

- Queen Elizabeth Stakes 2000m (G1) Randwick 2007
- Dato Tan Chin Name Stakes (G2) Moonee Valley 2007
- McNeil Stakes 1200m (G3) Caulfield 2006
- Schweppes Stakes 1400m (G3) Caulfield 2007
- Bletchingly Stakes 1200m (G3) Caulfield 2007

3rd

- Cox Plate 2040m (G1) Moonee Valley 2007

4th:

- Cadbury Guineas 1600m (G1) Caulfield 2007

== Stud record ==
Haradasun was retired to stand at the Coolmore Stud where in 2008 he covered 133 mares at $55,000 a mare. His service fee for 2009 is $35,750.
