= El Segundo (horse) =

New Zealand Thoroughbred racehorse

- Sire: Pins (AUS)
- Grandsire: Snippets
- Dam: Palos Verdes
- Damsire: Flying Spur
- Sex: Gelding
- Foaled: 11 September 2001
- Country: New Zealand
- Colour: Bay
- Breeder: PH & CG Brown, DW Howell, IG & WG Hickey & P Murphy
- Trainer: Colin Little
- Record: 35: 12-4-4
- Earnings: A$3,964,375

Major wins
- Yalumba Stakes 2005; Memsie Stakes 2006; Underwood Stakes 2006; John F Feehan Stakes 2007; C F Orr Stakes 2007; W. S. Cox Plate 2007

Awards
- Australian Champion Middle-Distance Racehorse (2008)
- Last updated on 8 April 2010

El Segundo (foaled 11 September 2001 in New Zealand) is a retired Thoroughbred racehorse. He is a bay son of Pins from the mare Palos Verdes by Flying Spur.

Foaled in 2001 at Ancroft Stud, Matamata, New Zealand he was sold as a yearling for $140,000 and has spent his entire racing career in Australia under the care of trainer Colin Little.

Amongst his major wins are the 2007 W. S. Cox Plate, 2007 MRC C F Orr Stakes, 2006 MRC Underwood Stakes and the 2005 Yalumba Stakes.

Aided by his victory in the W. S. Cox Plate, El Segundo was recognised with an IHFA handicappers rating of 122, placing him equal 18th in the world top 50 on assessed performances from 1 June to 25 November 2007.

Since January 2008, El Segundo has had stem cell tendon regeneration treatment on a superficial digital flexor tendon he injured.

El Segundo sustained a tendon injury after finishing fifth behind Danleigh in the 2010 George Ryder Stakes, and the rising 9 year old was retired from racing. Trainer Colin Little said "Enough is enough. He has had issues with his right fetlock throughout his career. The injury is not that serious but the time has come. It is sad because he has been a part of my family for six years and has been a life-changing horse for us."
