= 2014 Melbourne Cup =

Australian horse race

- Melbourne Cup
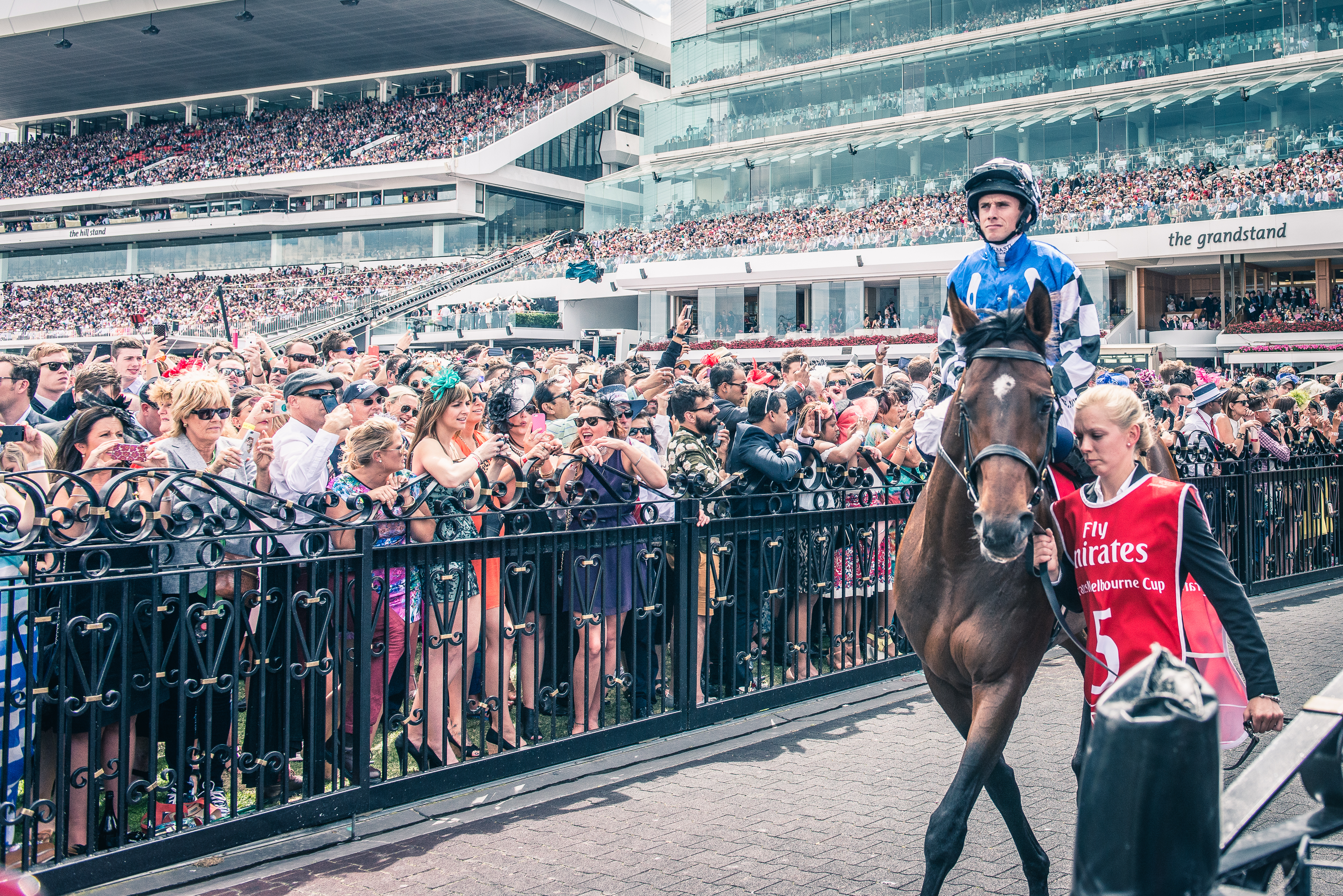
- Protectionist and jockey Ryan Moore at the 2014 Melbourne Cup
- Location: Flemington Racecourse; Melbourne, Australia
- Date: 4 November 2014
- Winning horse: Protectionist
- Starting price: $8
- Jockey: Ryan Moore
- Trainer: Andreas Wohler
- Surface: Grass
- Attendance: 100,794

Red Cadeaux hits the front, Signoff coming after him with 300 metres to go, Willing Foe starting to run on down the outside and Protectionist is bursting through. Protectionist raced to Red Cadeaux, Who Shot Thebarman and then Signoff. But Protectionist raced away at the hundred meter mark, it's Germany's Melbourne Cup! Protectionist by three lengths to Red Cadeaux and Protectionist bolted in the Cup by three! Red Cadeaux second again.

— Commentator Greg Miles describes the climax of the race

The 2014 Emirates Melbourne Cup was the 154th running of the Melbourne Cup, Australia's most prestigious Thoroughbred horse race. The race, run over 3,200 metres, was held on 4 November 2014, at Flemington Racecourse in Melbourne. Protectionist, ridden by Ryan Moore and trained by German Andreas Wöhler, won the race by four lengths, becoming the first German-trained winner of the Melbourne Cup. Red Cadeaux placed second and Who Shot Thebarman third, with Red Cadeaux the first horse to place second on three occasions.

The total prize money for the race was A$6.2 million, with the winner receiving $3.6 million, as well as a solid gold trophy valued at $175,000. Hosted by the Victoria Racing Club, the Melbourne Cup was one of four major Group-1 races held at Flemington during the Spring Racing Carnival (the others being the Victoria Derby, the Crown Oaks, and the Emirates Stakes). An estimated $800 million was wagered on the race, which was attended by 100,794 people.

== Field ==
The field for the 2014 Melbourne Cup consisted of 24 horses, with the barrier draw conducted three days prior to the race, after the conclusion of the Victoria Derby meeting. The field was one of the oldest in the race's history, with an average age of 6.8 years. Unusually, only two horses in the race were bred in Australia, though a majority of trainers and jockeys were from Australia. Jockeys Glyn and Chad Schofield became the first father and son in the race since 1968, when George and Gary Moore both rode.

Sea Moon was scratched the day before the race, after suffering from an ailment. English horse Cavalryman was scratched on the morning of the race due to foreleg swelling.

No.	Horse		Trainer(s)		Jockey		Weight	Barrier	Place
1	(Japan)	Admire Rakti ^{†}	(Japan)	Tomoyuki Umeda	(Australia)	Zac Purton	58.5 kg	8	22nd
2	(United Kingdom)	Cavalryman	(United Arab Emirates)	Saeed bin Suroor	(Australia)	Craig Williams	57 kg	3	Scratched
3	(Australia)	Fawkner	(Australia)	Robert Hickmott	(Australia)	Nicholas Hall	57 kg	9	10th
4	(United Kingdom)	Red Cadeaux	(United Kingdom)	Ed Dunlop	(France)	Gérald Mossé	57 kg	15	2nd
5	(Germany)	Protectionist	(Germany)	Andreas Wöhler	(United Kingdom)	Ryan Moore	56.5 kg	11	1st
6	(United Kingdom)	Sea Moon	(Australia)	Robert Hickmott	(Australia)	Tommy Berry	56.5 kg	18	Scratched
7	(Republic of Ireland)	Seismos	(United Kingdom)	Marco Botti	(Australia)	Craig Newitt	56 kg	1	9th
8	(United Kingdom)	Junoob	(New Zealand)	Chris Waller	(Australia)	Hugh Bowman	55.5 kg	7	18th
9	(Republic of Ireland)	Royal Diamond	(Republic of Ireland)	Johnny Murtagh	(Australia)	Steven Arnold	55.5 kg	6	20th
10	(United Kingdom)	Gatewood	(United Kingdom)	John Gosden	(United Kingdom)	William Buick	55 kg	21	12th
11	(Republic of Ireland)	Mutual Regard	(Republic of Ireland)	Johnny Murtagh	(Australia)	Damien Oliver	55 kg	12	14th
12	(New Zealand)	Who Shot Thebarman	(New Zealand)	Chris Waller	(Australia)	Glen Boss	55 kg	13	3rd
13	(United States)	Willing Foe	(United Arab Emirates)	Saeed bin Suroor	(New Zealand)	James McDonald	55 kg	17	5th
14	(Republic of Ireland)	My Ambivalent	(United Kingdom)	Roger Varian	(Italy)	Andrea Atzeni	54.5 kg	4	17th
15	(New Zealand)	Precedence	(Australia) (Australia)	Bart Cummings; James Cummings	(Australia)	Michael Rodd	54.5 kg	19	6th
16	(New Zealand)	Brambles	(Australia)	Peter Moody	(Australia)	Luke Nolen	54 kg	20	15th
17	(New Zealand)	Mr O'Ceirin	(Australia)	Michael Moroney	(Australia)	Chad Schofield	54 kg	18	21st
18	(Republic of Ireland)	Au Revoir	(France)	André Fabre	(Australia)	Glyn Schofield	53.5 kg	22	8th
19	(France)	Lidari	(Australia)	Peter Moody	(Australia)	Ben Melham	53.5 kg	10	19th
20	(Republic of Ireland)	Opinion	(New Zealand)	Chris Waller	(Australia)	Tye Angland	53.5 kg	14	11th
21	(United Kingdom)	Araldo	(Australia)	Michael Moroney	(Australia)	Dwayne Dunn	53 kg	23	7th
22	(New Zealand)	Lucia Valentina	(Australia)	Kris Lees	(Australia)	Kerrin McEvoy	53 kg	2	13th
23	(Australia)	Unchain My Heart	(Australia) (Australia)	David Hayes; Tom Dabernig	(Australia)	Dean Yendall	51.5 kg	5	16th
24	(Republic of Ireland)	Signoff	(Australia)	Darren Weir	(Brazil)	João Moreira	51 kg	16	4th

† Indicates race favourite

== Fatalities ==
Race favourite Admire Rakti placed last and died shortly after the race from cardiac arrest following ventricular fibrillation. Another horse, Araldo, shattered a hind pastern when frightened by a spectator after the race. He was later euthanised.

== See also ==
- List of Melbourne Cup winners
