= Red Cadeaux =

British-bred Thoroughbred racehorse

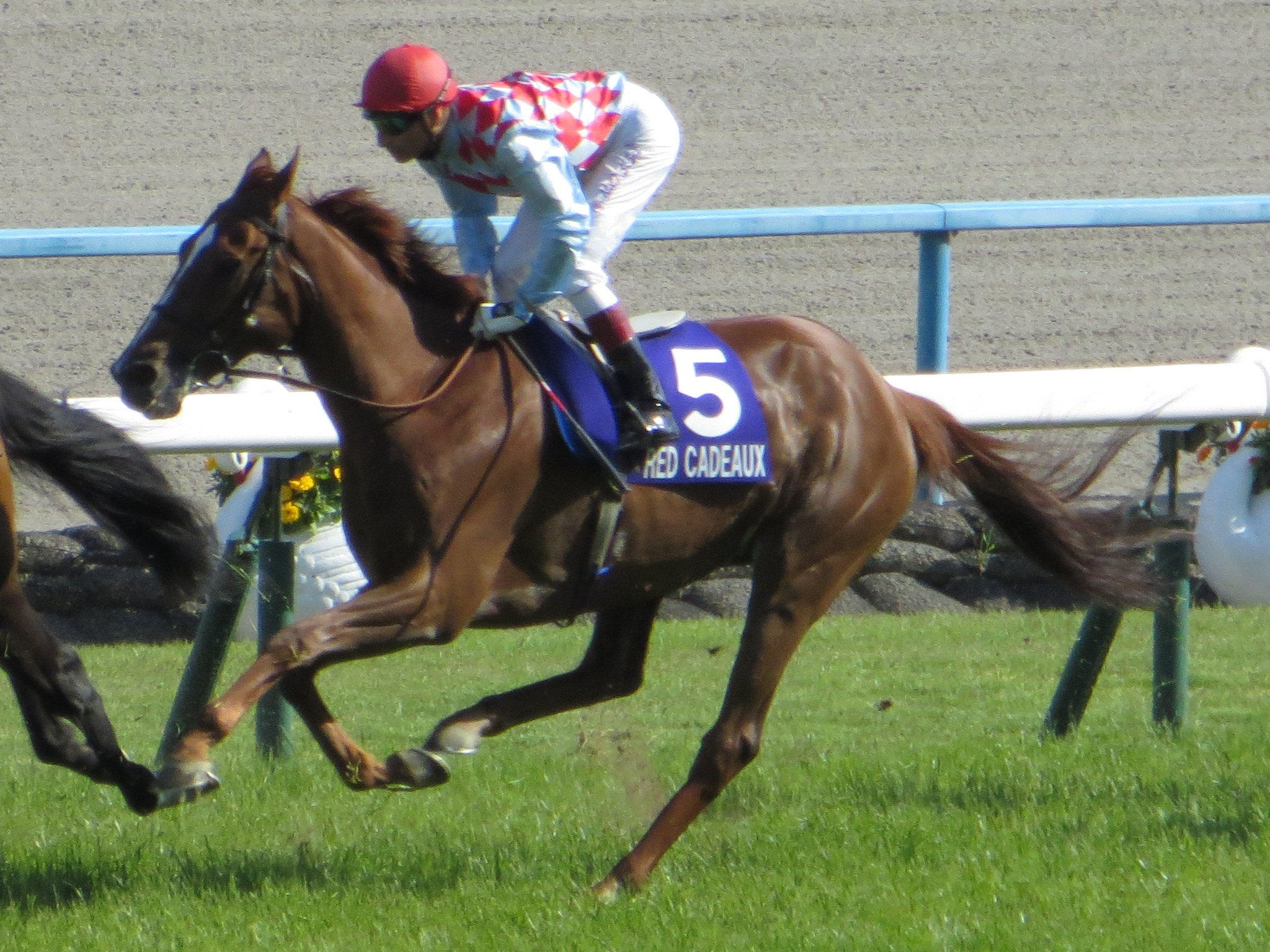
- Red Cadeaux in May 2014
- Sire: Cadeaux Genereux
- Grandsire: Young Generation
- Dam: Artisia
- Damsire: Peintre Celebre
- Sex: Gelding
- Foaled: 6 March 2006
- Died: 21 November 2015
- Country: Great Britain
- Colour: Chestnut
- Owner: Ronald Arculli
- Trainer: Ed Dunlop
- Record: 54: 7–13–7
- Earnings: £4,998,408

Major wins
- Curragh Cup (2011); Yorkshire Cup (2012); Hong Kong Vase (2012)

Red Cadeaux (6 March 2006 – 21 November 2015) was a British-bred Thoroughbred racehorse who was a triple runner up in the Melbourne Cup in 2011, 2013 and 2014.

== Racing career ==
Notable performances by Red Cadeaux include:

- June 2011 – 1st in Group 3 Curragh Cup (2800m)
- September 2011 – 3rd in the Group One Irish St Leger (2800m)
- November 2011 – 2nd in the Group One 2011 Melbourne Cup (3200m) behind Dunaden with Lucas Cranach 3rd.
- December 2011 – 3rd in the Group 1 Hong Kong Vase (2400m)
- May 2012 – 1st in the Yorkshire Cup (2800m)
- November 2012 – 8th in the 2012 Melbourne Cup behind Green Moon, Fiorente and Jakkalberry.
- November 2012 – 8th in the Japan Cup (2400m) behind Gentildonna and Orfevre
- December 2012 – 1st in the Hong Kong Vase
- March 2013 – 2nd in the Group One Dubai World Cup (2000m) behind Animal Kingdom with Planteur 3rd
- April 2013 – 3rd in the Tenno Sho (Spring) (3200m) behind Fenomeno
- November 2013 – 2nd in the 2013 Melbourne Cup behind Fiorente with Mount Athos 3rd.
- November 2014 – 2nd in the 2014 Melbourne Cup behind Protectionist with Who Shot Thebarman 3rd.
- April 2015 – 2nd in the Queen Elizabeth Stakes (2000m, Randwick)

He was euthanized on 21 November 2015, following complications after surgery for a sesamoid bone fracture in his left front fetlock. The injury was sustained during the 2015 Melbourne Cup, his fifth appearance in the event.

He garnered $8 million in prize money during his career. He was due to spend his retirement at the Living Legends quarter in Melbourne, but as per his owner's request Red Cadeaux was buried at Flemington.

== Pedigree ==
Pedigree of Red Cadeaux
Sire Cadeaux Genereux 1985	Young Generation; 1976	Balidar	Will Somers
Sire Cadeaux Genereux 1985	Young Generation; 1976	Balidar	Violet Bank
Sire Cadeaux Genereux 1985	Young Generation; 1976	Brig O'Doon	Shantung
Sire Cadeaux Genereux 1985	Young Generation; 1976	Brig O'Doon	Tam O'Shanter
Sire Cadeaux Genereux 1985	Smarten Up; 1975	Sharpen Up	Atan
Sire Cadeaux Genereux 1985	Smarten Up; 1975	Sharpen Up	Rocchetta
Sire Cadeaux Genereux 1985	Smarten Up; 1975	L'Anguissola	Soderini
Sire Cadeaux Genereux 1985	Smarten Up; 1975	L'Anguissola	Posh
Dam Artisia 2000	*Peintre Celebre; 1994	Nureyev	Northern Dancer*
Dam Artisia 2000	*Peintre Celebre; 1994	Nureyev	Special
Dam Artisia 2000	*Peintre Celebre; 1994	Peinture Bleue	Alydar
Dam Artisia 2000	*Peintre Celebre; 1994	Peinture Bleue	Petroleuse
Dam Artisia 2000	Almaaseh; 1988	Dancing Brave	Lyphard*
Dam Artisia 2000	Almaaseh; 1988	Dancing Brave	Navajo Princess
Dam Artisia 2000	Almaaseh; 1988	Al Bahathri	Blushing Groom
Dam Artisia 2000	Almaaseh; 1988	Al Bahathri	Chain Store

* Red Cadeaux is inbred 4D x 5D to the stallion Northern Dancer, meaning that he appears fourth generation and fifth generation (via Lyphard) on the dam side of his pedigree.
