= Araldo (horse) =

British-bred Thoroughbred racehorse

- Sire: High Chaparral
- Grandsire: Sadler's Wells
- Dam: Alanda
- Damsire: Lando
- Sex: Horse
- Foaled: 12 March 2008
- Country: United Kingdom
- Colour: Bay
- Owner: R & C Legh Racing Pty Ltd
- Trainer: Michael Moroney
- Record: 16: 4-3-3
- Earnings: A$482,694

Major wins
- 2013 The Bart Cummings

Araldo (12 March 2008 – 4 November 2014) was a British-born Thoroughbred racehorse. He was trained by Michael Moroney and owned by R & C Legh Racing Pty Ltd. In 2013, Araldo won The Bart Cummings, a Victoria Racing Club race held at the Flemington Racecourse. Araldo also raced at the 154th Melbourne Cup on 4 November 2014, finishing 7th with jockey Dwayne Dunn. However, after the race, he shattered a hind pastern when frightened by a spectator, and was subsequently euthanised. Race favourite Admire Rakti also died that day from a cardiac arrest after ventricular fibrillation, after finishing last.

== Pedigree ==
Pedigree of Araldo (GB), 2008
Sire High Chaparral 1999	Sadler's Wells	Northern Dancer	Nearctic
Sire High Chaparral 1999	Sadler's Wells	Northern Dancer	Natalma
Sire High Chaparral 1999	Sadler's Wells	Fairy Bridge	Bold Reason
Sire High Chaparral 1999	Sadler's Wells	Fairy Bridge	Special
Sire High Chaparral 1999	Kasora	Darshaan	Shirley Heights
Sire High Chaparral 1999	Kasora	Darshaan	Delsy
Sire High Chaparral 1999	Kasora	Kozana	Kris
Sire High Chaparral 1999	Kasora	Kozana	Koblenza
Dam Alanda 2000	Lando	Acatenango	Northern Dancer
Dam Alanda 2000	Lando	Acatenango	Fairy Bridge
Dam Alanda 2000	Lando	Laurea	Slewpy
Dam Alanda 2000	Lando	Laurea	Hirondelle
Dam Alanda 2000	Arastou	Surumu	Litera
Dam Alanda 2000	Arastou	Surumu	Surama
Dam Alanda 2000	Arastou	Arabeske	Kronzeuge
Dam Alanda 2000	Arastou	Arabeske	Ankertrosse
