= Buckhounds Stakes =

Flat horse race in Britain

- Class: Listed
- Location: Ascot Racecourse; Ascot, England
- Inaugurated: 2005
- Race type: Flat / Thoroughbred
- Sponsor: Carey Group
- Website: Ascot

Race information
- Distance: 1m 3f 211y (2,406 metres)
- Surface: Turf
- Track: Right-handed
- Qualification: Four-years-old and up Excl G1 winners after 31 August 2020
- Weight: 9 st 0 lb Allowances; 5 lb for fillies and mares Penalties; 7 lb for Group 2 winners * 5 lb for Group 3 winners * 3 lb for Listed winners * * after 31 August 2020
- Purse: £51,150 (2022); 1st: £29,489

Buckhounds Stakes
2022
Al Aasy	Mandoob	Third Realm

Previous years
2021
Albaflora	Tribal Craft	Without A Fight

2020-2011
2020
Dashing Willoughby	Secret Advisor	First In Line
2019
Salouen	What About Carlo	Barsanti
2018
Barsanti	Mirage Dancer	Salouen
2017
Desert Encounter	Star Storm	Restorer
2016
Elite Army	Scotland	Missed Call
2015
Agent Murphy	Red Galileo	Felix Mendelssohn
2014
Gatewood	Pether's Moon	Elidor
2013
Ektihaam	Thomas Chippendale	Main Sequence
2012
Aiken	Tameen	Dawn Twister
2011
Alainmaar	Shamali	Verdant

2010-2005
2010
Barshiba	Duncan	Starfala
2009
Duncan	Starfala	Steele Tango
2008
Spanish Moon	Munsef	Petara Bay
2007
Mountain High	Akarem	Balkan Knight
2006
Akarem	Frank Sonata	Profit's Reality
2005
Persian Lightning	Red Lancer	Razkalla

The Buckhounds Stakes is a Listed flat horse race in Great Britain open to horses aged four years or older. It is run at Ascot over a distance of 1 mile 3 furlongs and 211 yards (2,406 metres), and it is scheduled to take place each year in May. The race was first run in 2005 over 11½ furlongs, increased to 12 furlongs the following year.

== Records ==
Most successful horse:

- No horse has won this race more than once

Leading jockey (2 wins):

- Ryan Moore - Spanish Moore (2008), Aiken (2012)
- Jimmy Fortune - Duncan (2009), Agent Murphy (2015)
- Oisin Murphy - Salouen (2019), Dashing Willoughby (2020)

Leading trainer (3 wins):

- John Gosden - Duncan (2009), Aiken (2012), Gatewood (2014)
- Roger Varian - Alainmaar (2011), Ektihaam (2013), Barsanti (2018)

== Winners ==
Year	Winner	Age	Jockey	Trainer	Time
2005 (Note: The 2005 running was held at Lingfield Park)	Persian Lightning	6	Ian Mongan	John Dunlop	2:32.17
2006	Akarem	5	Pat Cosgrave	Karl Burke	2:35.65
2007	Mountain High	5	Kerrin McEvoy	Sir Michael Stoute	2:42.05
2008	Spanish Moon	4	Ryan Moore	Sir Michael Stoute	2:30.87
2009	Duncan	4	Jimmy Fortune	John Gosden	2:31.93
2010	Barshiba	6	Hayley Turner	David Elsworth	2:32.03
2011	Alainmaar	5	Richard Hills	Roger Varian	2:32.28
2012	Aiken	4	Ryan Moore	John Gosden	2:40.12
2013	Ektihaam	4	Paul Hanagan	Roger Varian	2:32.00
2014	Gatewood	6	Frankie Dettori	John Gosden	2:36.13
2015	Agent Murphy	4	Jimmy Fortune	Brian Meehan	2:31.83
2016	Elite Army	5	William Buick	Saeed bin Suroor	2:32.03
2017	Desert Encounter	5	Sean Levey	David Simcock	2:33.38
2018	Barsanti	6	Andrea Atzeni	Roger Varian	2:28.96
2019	Salouen	5	Oisin Murphy	Sylvester Kirk	2:38.00
2020 (Note: The 2020 race was run at Newmarket Racecourse in June, due to the COVID-19 pandemic in the United Kingdom)	Dashing Willoughby	4	Oisin Murphy	Andrew Balding	2:29.58
2021	Albaflora	4	Rossa Ryan	Ralph Beckett	2:37.04
2022	Al Aasy	5	Dane O'Neill	William Haggas	2:34.55

== See also ==
- Horse racing in Great Britain
- List of British flat horse races
