= Tapster Stakes =

Flat horse race in Britain

Tapster Stakes
2026
Tenability	Hamish	Glen Buck

Previous years
2025
Hamish	Military Academy	Palladium
2024
King Of Conquest	Aimeric	Passion And Glory
2023
Peripatetic	First Ruler	Candleford
2022
Third Realm	Something Enticing	Lone Eagle
2021
Hukum	On To Victory	Morando

2020-2011
2020
Trueshan	Alignak	Mountain Hunter
2019
Mirage Dancer	Danehill Kodiac	Barsanti
2018
Mirage Dancer	Euginio	Duke Of Bronte
2017
Second Step	Desert Encounter	Barsanti
2016
Mount Logan	Sweeping Up	Noble Gift
2015
Ayrad	Rawaki	Eye of The Storm
2014
Gatewood	Mirsaale	Kelinni
2013
Noble Mission	Genzy	Moment In Time
2012
Sea Moon	Dandino	Berling
2011
Passion For Gold	Jet Away	Steele Tango

2010-2007
2010
Holberg	Manighar	Opinion Poll
2009
Mad Rush	Halicarnassus	Illustrious Blue
2008
Peppertree Lane	Eastern Anthem	Speed Gifted
2007
Ivy Creek	Shahin	Foxhaven

The Tapster Stakes is a Listed flat horse race in Great Britain open to horses aged four years or older. It is run at Goodwood over a distance of 1 mile 3 furlongs and 218 yards (2,412 metres), and it is scheduled to take place each year in June.

The race was first run in 2007.

== Records ==
Most successful horse (2 wins):

- Mirage Dancer (2018, 2019)

Leading jockey (3 wins):

- Frankie Dettori – Holberg (2010), Passion For Gold (2011), Gatewood (2014)

Leading trainer (4 wins):

- Roger Varian - Ayrad (2015), Mount Logan (2016), Third Realm (2022), Peripatetic (2023)

== Winners ==
Year	Winner	Age	Jockey	Trainer	Time
2007	Ivy Creek	4	Steve Drowne	Geoff Wragg	2:38.38
2008	Peppertree Lane	5	Joe Fanning	Mark Johnston	2:37.82
2009	Mad Rush	5	Ryan Moore	Luca Cumani	2:36.18
2010	Holberg	4	Frankie Dettori	Saeed bin Suroor	2:34.62
2011	Passion For Gold	4	Frankie Dettori	Saeed bin Suroor	2:37.93
2012	Sea Moon	4	Ryan Moore	Sir Michael Stoute	2:36.14
2013	Noble Mission	4	Ian Mongan	Sir Henry Cecil	2:40.54
2014	Gatewood	6	Frankie Dettori	John Gosden	2:48.77
2015	Ayrad	4	Graham Lee	Roger Varian	2:36.03
2016	Mount Logan	3	Andrea Atzeni	Roger Varian	2:44.30
2017	Second Step	6	Jamie Spencer	Roger Charlton	2:39.64
2018	Mirage Dancer	4	Pat Dobbs	Sir Michael Stoute	2:42.04
2019	Mirage Dancer	5	Pat Dobbs	Sir Michael Stoute	2:39.43
2020 (Note: The 2020 race was run at Haydock in July due to the COVID-19 pandemic in the United Kingdom)	Trueshan	4	Martin Harley	Alan King	2:32.98
2021	Hukum	4	Jim Crowley	Owen Burrows	2:45.83
2022	Third Realm	4	Andrea Atzeni	Roger Varian	2:39.23
2023	Peripatetic	4	David Egan	Roger Varian	2:38.12
2024	King Of Conquest	5	William Buick	Charlie Appleby	2:35.56
2025	Hamish	9	Tom Marquand	William Haggas	2:41.60
2026	Tenability	4	Cieren Fallon	William Haggas	2:44.53

== See also ==
- Horse racing in Great Britain
- List of British flat horse races
