= Hukum =

British racehorse and sire

- Racing silks of Shadwell Estate
- Sire: Sea the Stars
- Grandsire: Cape Cross
- Dam: Aghareed
- Damsire: Kingmambo
- Sex: Colt
- Foaled: 2 April 2017
- Country: United Kingdom
- Color: Bay
- Breeder: Shadwell Estate
- Owner: Shadwell Estate
- Trainer: Owen Burrows
- Record: 17: 11-1-2
- Earnings: £1,388,120

Major wins
- King George V Stakes (2020); Geoffrey Freer Stakes (2020, 2021); Tapster Stakes (2021); John Smith's Silver Cup Stakes (2021); Cumberland Lodge Stakes (2021); Dubai City of Gold (2022); Coronation Cup (2022); Brigadier Gerard Stakes (2023); King George VI and Queen Elizabeth Stakes (2023); Timeform rating: 131
- Last updated on 15 October 2023

Hukum (foaled 2 April 2017) is a British Thoroughbred racehorse and sire. He won the second of his two starts as a juvenile in 2019 and improved to become a high-class middle-distance performer in the following year when he took the King George V Stakes and Geoffrey Freer Stakes. In 2021 he repeated his win in the Geoffrey Freer Stakes as well as taking the Tapster Stakes, John Smith's Silver Cup Stakes and Cumberland Lodge Stakes. Hukum went on to further success as a five-year-old when he won the Dubai City of Gold and the Coronation Cup before his season was ended by injury. He returned as a six-year-old to win the Brigadier Gerard Stakes and the King George VI and Queen Elizabeth Stakes. The horse was retired on 15 October 2023 to stand at stud in Japan.

== Background ==
Hukum is a bay horse with no white markings bred in England by Hamdan bin Rashid Al Maktoum's Shadwell Estate. The colt was sent into training with Owen Burrows at Kingwood House Stable near Lambourn in Berkshire. He has been ridden in all of his races by Jim Crowley.

He was from the ninth crop of foals sired by Sea the Stars who won the 2000 Guineas, Epsom Derby and Prix de l'Arc de Triomphe in 2009. His other major winners have included Harzand, Taghrooda, Stradivarius, Sea of Class and Sea The Moon.

Hukum's dam Aghareed showed good racing ability, winning two of her five starts including the Listed Prix de Liancourt before becoming a successful broodmare whose other foals included Baaeed. She was a daughter of the Breeders' Cup Filly & Mare Turf winner Lahudood and a female-line descendant of the outstanding racehorse and broodmare Height of Fashion.

== Racing career ==
=== 2019: two-year-old season ===
Hukum made his racecourse debut in a novice race (for juveniles with no more than two previous wins) over seven furlongs on good to firm ground at Newbury Racecourse on 21 September when he finished third to Cherokee Trail, six lengths behind the winner. In November he started 11/4 second favourite for a similar event on the synthetic polytrack surface at Kempton Park Racecourse and recorded his first success as he took the lead in the closing stages and won by a length from Laser Show.

=== 2020: three-year-old season ===
The 2020 flat racing season in Britain and Ireland was delayed as a result of the COVID-19 pandemic and Hukum made his first appearance in the King George V Stakes, a handicap race which was run behind closed doors at Royal Ascot on 17 June. He was assigned a weight of 123 pounds and started at odds on 12/1 in a seventeen-runner field. After tracking the leaders he went to the front a furlong from the finish and kept on "gamely" to win by half a length from Kipps, with Subjectivist close behind in third place. He lost a shoe during the race and sustained an injury to his right hind fetlock. Owen Burrows commented "We’ve always liked him. The worry coming into this was he lacked a run and a bit of experience but he did it well... He was originally entered in the Derby but he got struck into on his right hind so we’ll have to see how he is."

Hukum was off the track for two months before being moved up in class and distance to take on older horses in the Group 2 Geoffrey Freer Stakes over thirteen and a half furlongs at Newbury. He started at odds of 4/1 in a seven-runner field which included the previous Group race winners Morando (Ormonde Stakes), Max Vega (Zetland Stakes) and Communique (Princess of Wales's Stakes). Crowley positioned Hukum close behind the front-running Max Vega before taking the lead approaching the final furlong and winning "comfortably" by a length. After the race Crowley said "he picked them up really well and he's improving with every race... He's a lovely horse who would go on most type of grounds and he has a zip about him."

For his final race of the season Hukum was stepped up to the highest level to contest the Group 1 St Leger Stakes on 12 September. Starting the 7/2 second favourite he came home fifth behind Galileo Chrome, beaten just over four lengths by the winner after tiring in the final furlong.

=== 2021: four-year-old season ===
Before the start of Hukum's third season his owner Hamdan Al Maktoum died and the colt raced thenceforth in the ownership of Shadwell Estate. The colt began his campaign in the Group 3 Brigadier Gerard Stakes over ten furlongs at Sandown Park on 23 April when he finished fourth of the seven runners behind Waldkonig. A month later Hukum started 5/6 favourite for the Listed Tapster Stakes over one and a half miles at Goodwood Racecourse and won by one and a half lengths from the seven-year-old On To Victory despite hanging to the right in the closing stages.

In June Hukum ran for the second time at Royal Ascot, but failed to reproduce his 2020 success as he came home third behind Wonderful Tonight and Broome in the Hardwicke Stakes. On 10 July the colt was moved up in distance for the Group 3 John Smith's Silver Cup Stakes over fourteen furlongs and started the 3/1 favourite against nine opponents including Sonnyboyliston, Fujaira Prince (Ebor Handicap), Morando and Max Vega. He tracked the leaders before taking the lead inside the last quarter mile and won by one and three quarter lengths from the front-running Outbox. Hukum then attempted to repeat his success of the previous year in the Geoffrey Freer Stakes and started the 8/11 in a field of eight which also included Golden Pass (Aphrodite Stakes), Pablo Escobarr (Glorious Stakes) and Red Verdon (Prix Maurice de Nieuil). Hukum won "readily" as he took the advantage approaching the last quarter mile, opened up a clear advantage and came home more than three lengths ahead of Rodrigo Diaz. After the race Burrows commented "He was up for it today. He was a bit of a lad to saddle and just throwing his weight around a little bit" before suggesting that Hukum might embark on international campaign with the Canadian International Stakes, Hong Kong Vase and Breeders' Cup Turf being mentioned as potential targets.

On 4 September on the polytrack at Kempton, Hukum started 30/100 favourite for the September Stakes but was beaten a neck into second place by the five-year-old Hamish, with Burrows stating that the colt had made a "respiratory noise". Hukum ended his season in the Group 3 Cumberland Lodge Stakes over one and a half miles at Ascot in October and started 85/40 favourite against seven opponents including Quickthorn (Duke of Edinburgh Stakes), Alounak (Preis der Sparkassen-Finanzgruppe), Ilaraab (Ebor Handicap) and Wells Farhh Go (Bahrain Trophy). Hukum tracked the pace-setter Quickthorn before going to the front a quarter mile from the finish and drew away from his opponents in the closing stages to win in "impressive" style by six and a half lengths. Burrows commented "He's been an absolute star for us. He turns up every time and he's a pleasure to have anything to do with."

=== 2022: five-year-old season ===
In 2022, Shadwell cut down the number of their horses in training and Owen Burrows' operation moved to the Farncombe Down Stables in Lambourn. In early 2022 Hukum was sent to Dubai to race at Meydan and began his campaign in the Group 2 Dubai City of Gold (a trial race for the Sheema Classic) over 2400 metres on 2 March. Starting the odds-on favourite in a fourteen-runner field which included runners from Bahrain, Turkey, Norway, Sweden and the UAE he raced in mid division before making "smooth progress" to take the lead 150 metres from the finish and won by a head from Without A Fight. Burrows said "It's obviously a big thing coming over to Dubai with my first runner and it couldn't have gone any better... Whatever Hukum did today, he was going to come on plenty for. Jim said he didn't have that hard a race, he wasn't blowing too much there but he's got three weeks now to enjoy this warmth and I'm sure he will come on plenty." On 26 March the horse started at odds of 10/1 for the Dubai Sheema Classic and came home seventh behind Shahryar, Yibir, Authority, Pyledriver, Uberleben and Alenquer, beaten less than two lengths by the winner.

Following his return to Europe Hukum was entered in the Coronation Cup over one and a half miles at Epsom Racecourse on 3 June. Ridden by Crowley he started the 11/4 third choice in the betting behind Pyledriver and Manobo (Prix Chaudenay) in a six-runner field which also included High Definition (Beresford Stakes), Living Legend (Jockey Club Stakes) and Palavecino. Hukum settled in second place behind Pyledriver and moved up to dispute the lead entering the straight, at which point the runners tracked right to race up the stands side. He gained the advantage approaching the last quarter mile and drew away in the closing stages to win by more than four lengths. After the race Burrows said "He’s been a wonderful horse for me. I’m thrilled he’s done it, for myself and for everyone back home... We have reduced numbers now but we still have a good team and it means a lot to do it for Shadwell and Sheikh Hamdan’s family... I thought he was pretty impressive there. We’ll have to see where he goes next."

Three days after Hukum's win at Epsom Burrows announced that the horse had been found to be lame when returning from the race and had undergone an operation to insert three screws into an injured hind leg. He explained that Hukum would require an extended period of recovery and might be retired to become a breeding stallion.

== Stud career ==
On October 17, 2023, Shadwell Estate announced that Hukum would stand stud at Darley Japan in Hokkaido. His service fee for the 2024 season is 1.2 million yen.

== Pedigree ==
Pedigree of Hukum (GB), bay horse, 2017
Sire Sea the Stars (IRE) 2006	Cape Cross (IRE); 1994	Green Desert	Danzig
Sire Sea the Stars (IRE) 2006	Cape Cross (IRE); 1994	Green Desert	Foreign Courier
Sire Sea the Stars (IRE) 2006	Cape Cross (IRE); 1994	Park Appeal	Ahonoora
Sire Sea the Stars (IRE) 2006	Cape Cross (IRE); 1994	Park Appeal	Balidaress
Sire Sea the Stars (IRE) 2006	Urban Sea (USA); 1989	Miswaki	Mr. Prospector
Sire Sea the Stars (IRE) 2006	Urban Sea (USA); 1989	Miswaki	Hopespringseternal
Sire Sea the Stars (IRE) 2006	Urban Sea (USA); 1989	Allegretta	Lombard
Sire Sea the Stars (IRE) 2006	Urban Sea (USA); 1989	Allegretta	Anatevka
Dam Aghareed (USA) 2009	Kingmambo (USA); 1990	Mr. Prospector	Raise a Native
Dam Aghareed (USA) 2009	Kingmambo (USA); 1990	Mr. Prospector	Gold Digger
Dam Aghareed (USA) 2009	Kingmambo (USA); 1990	Miesque	Nureyev
Dam Aghareed (USA) 2009	Kingmambo (USA); 1990	Miesque	Pasadoble
Dam Aghareed (USA) 2009	Lahudood (GB); 2003	Singspiel (IRE)	In The Wings (GB)
Dam Aghareed (USA) 2009	Lahudood (GB); 2003	Singspiel (IRE)	Glorious Song (CAN)
Dam Aghareed (USA) 2009	Lahudood (GB); 2003	Rahayeb	Arazi (USA)
Dam Aghareed (USA) 2009	Lahudood (GB); 2003	Rahayeb	Bashayer (USA) (Family: 2-f)

- Hukum is inbred 3 × 4 to Mr Prospector, meaning that this stallion appears in both the third and fourth generations of his pedigree.
