= 2013 Dubai World Cup =

18th Dubai World Cup
- Dubai World Cup
- Location: Meydan
- Date: 30 March 2013
- Winning horse: Animal Kingdom (USA)
- Jockey: Joel Rosario
- Trainer: Graham Motion (USA)
- Owner: Arrowfield Stud & Team Valor

The 2013 Dubai World Cup was a horse race held at Meydan Racecourse on Saturday 30 March 2013. It was the 18th running of the Dubai World Cup.

The winner was Team Valor, Arrowfield Stud & Darley Stud's Animal Kingdom, a five-year-old chestnut entire horse trained in the United States by Graham Motion and ridden by Joel Rosario. Animal Kingdom's victory was the first in the race for his jockey, trainer and owners.

Animal Kingdom had been the American Champion Three-Year-Old Male Horse in 2011 when his wins included the Kentucky Derby but injury problems restricted him to only five races in almost twenty-three months before he competed in Dubai. In the World Cup he started the 11/2 third favourite and won by two lengths and four and three quarter lengths from the British-trained challengers Red Cadeaux and Planteur. The 5/2 favourite Hunter's Light finished seventh of the twelve runners.

== Race details ==
- Sponsor: Emirates
- Purse: £6,134,969; First prize: £3,680,981
- Surface: Tapeta
- Going: Standard
- Distance: 10 furlongs
- Number of runners: 12
- Winner's time: 2:03.21

== Full result ==
Pos.	Marg.	Horse (bred)	Age	Jockey	Trainer (Country)	Odds
1		Animal Kingdom (USA)	5	Joel Rosario	Graham Motion (USA)	11/2
2	2	Red Cadeaux (GB)	7	Gerald Mosse	Ed Dunlop (GB)	28/1
3	4¼	Planteur (IRE)	6	Ryan Moore	Marco Botti (GB)	20/1
4	nk	Side Glance (GB)	6	Jamie Spencer	Andrew Balding (GB)	33/1
5	nse	African Story (GB)	6	Mickael Barzalona	Saeed bin Suroor (GB/UAE)	8/1
6	2¼	Meandre (FR)	5	Maxime Guyon	André Fabre (FR)	20/1
7	2¼	Hunter's Light (IRE)	5	Silvestre de Sousa	Saeed bin Suroor (GB/UAE)	5/2 fav
8	¾	Treasure Beach (GB)	5	Christophe Soumillon	Mike de Kock (SAF)	25/1
9	1	Kassiano (GER)	4	William Buick	Saeed bin Suroor (GB/UAE)	16/1
10	7	Royal Delta (USA)	5	Mike Smith	Bill Mott (USA)	3/1
11	14	Dullahan (USA)	4	Gary Stevens	Dale Romans (USA)	14/1
12		Capponi (IRE)	6	Ahmed Ajtebi	Mahmood Al Zarooni (GB/UAE)	20/1

- Abbreviations: nse = nose; nk = neck; shd = short head; hd = head

== Winner's details ==
Further details of the winner, Animal Kingdom

- Sex: Stallion
- Foaled: 20 March 2008
- Country: United States
- Sire: Leroidesanimaux; Dam: Dalicia (Acatenango)
- Owner: Arrowfield Stud & Team Valor
- Breeder: Team Valor
