= Prix de Reux =

Flat horse race in France

- Class: Group 3
- Location: Deauville Racecourse; Deauville, France
- Race type: Flat / Thoroughbred
- Sponsor: Valparaiso Sporting Club
- Website: france-galop.com

Race information
- Distance: 2,500 metres (1m 4 1/2f)
- Surface: Turf
- Track: Right-handed
- Qualification: Three-years-old and up
- Weight: 55 kg (3yo); 59 1/2 kg (4yo+); Allowances; 1 1/2 kg for fillies and mares Penalties; 2 kg for Group 3 winners * 2 kg for Group 2 placed * * since January 1
- Purse: €80,000 (2021); 1st: €40,000

Prix de Reux
2023
Junko	Big Call	Alessio

Previous years
2022
Botanik	Glycon	Iresine
2021
Glycon	Alter Adler	Northern Ruler

2020-2011
2020
Skyward	Sublimis	Styledargent
2018
Finche	Tiberian	Called To The Bar
2017
Tiberian	Doha Dream	Tamelly
2016
Ventura Storm	Moonshiner	Big Blue
2015
Loresho	Seaport	Billabong
2014
Gatewood	Rio Tigre	Going Somewhere
2013
Tres Blue	Montclair	First Mohican
2012
Tenenbaum	Brigantin	Hammerfest
2011
Americain	Diamond Boy	Burma Gold

2010-2000
2010
Winter Dream	Telluride	Marinous
2009
Ideal World	Pouvoir Absolu	Mores Wells
2008
Magadino	Tempelstern	Cristobal
2007
Poet Laureate	Shujoon	Kiton
2006
Magadino	Vendangeur	Kocab
2005
Short Pause	Reefscape	Marend
2004
Martaline	Kindjhal	Affirmative Action
2003
Policy Maker	Senex	Le Fou
2002
Fair Mix	Breknen Le Noir	Foundation Spirit
2001
Ange Gabriel	Maximum Security	Epitre
2000
Epitre	Mont Rocher	Turbotiere

The Prix de Reux is a Group 3 flat horse race in France open to thoroughbreds aged three years or older. It is run over a distance of 2,500 metres (about 1 mile and 4 1/2 furlongs) at Deauville in early August.

== History ==
The event is named after Reux, a commune located to the south of Deauville. In the early part of the 20th century, it was a 1,000-metre race for two-year-olds.

The Prix de Reux became an open-age race over 2,600 metres in 1925. From this point it could serve as a trial for the Grand Prix de Deauville.

The race was held at Maisons-Laffitte on several occasions during World War II. It was cut to 2,500 metres in the 1970s.

For a period the event held Listed status. It was promoted to Group 3 level in 2013.

== Records ==
Most successful horse since 1979 (2 wins):

- Magadino – 2006, 2008

Leading jockey since 1979 (5 wins):

- Olivier Peslier – Dark Moondancer (1998), First Magnitude (1999), Epitre (2000), Fair Mix (2002), Tiberian (2017)

Leading trainer since 1979 (10 wins):

- André Fabre – Village Star (1987), Swain (1995), Water Poet (1996), First Magnitude (1999), Epitre (2000), Martaline (2004), Short Pause (2005), Poet Laureate (2007), Ideal World (2009), Tenenbaum (2012)

Leading owner since 1979 (4 wins):

- Khalid Abdullah – Regency (1994), Martaline (2004), Short Pause (2005), Ideal World (2009)

== Winners since 1979 ==
Year	Winner	Age	Jockey	Trainer	Owner	Time
1979	Jeune Loup	4	Alain Lequeux	Olivier Douieb	Mrs Jacques Herold
1980	River River	4	Philippe Paquet	François Boutin	Allen Manning
1981	Dom Menotti	4	Yves Saint-Martin	Olivier Douieb	Serge Fradkoff
1982	No Attention	4	Freddy Head	Robert Collet	Mrs Daniel Bertrand
1983	Oak Dancer	4	Jean-Claude Desaint	J. C. Cunnington	Mrs Faysal Abu Khadra
1984	Temoignage	4	Cash Asmussen	Pascal Bary	Rodolph Schafer
1985	Bonne Ile	4	Guy Guignard	Jonathan Pease	Arthur Budgett
1986	Noble Fighter	4	Alain Lequeux	Mitri Saliba	Mahmoud Fustok
1987	Village Star	4	Dominique Regnard	André Fabre	Tony Richards
1988	Genereux Genie	4	Freddy Head	Jean Lesbordes	Georges Blizniansky
1989	Tycana	4	Gérald Mossé	B. Margueritte	Jean Baud
1990	Lazaz	5	Gérald Mossé	Nicolas Clément	Stephen Grod
1991	Aelan Hapi	4	Éric Legrix	J. C. Cunnington	George Ohrstrom	2:44.60
1992	Dadarissime	3	Richard Briard	Georges Bridgland	Sir James Goldsmith
1993	Husband	3	Cash Asmussen	John Fellows	Peggy Augustus	2:47.60
1994	Regency	4	Freddy Head	Criquette Head	Khalid Abdullah	2:50.70
1995	Swain	3	Thierry Jarnet	André Fabre	Sheikh Mohammed	2:43.30
1996	Water Poet	3	Thierry Jarnet	André Fabre	Sheikh Mohammed	2:50.00
1997	Kaldoun Choice	3	Dominique Boeuf	Robert Collet	Maurice Clifford	2:42.10
1998	Dark Moondancer	3	Olivier Peslier	Peter Chapple-Hyam	Gillespie / Wilson	2:42.50
1999	First Magnitude	3	Olivier Peslier	André Fabre	Daniel Wildenstein	2:46.70
2000	Epitre	3	Olivier Peslier	André Fabre	Édouard de Rothschild	2:45.60
2001	Ange Gabriel	3	Christophe Soumillon	Eric Libaud	Antonia Devin	2:52.80
2002	Fair Mix	4	Olivier Peslier	Marcel Rolland	Ecurie Week-End	2:46.80
2003	Policy Maker	3	Dominique Boeuf	Élie Lellouche	Ecurie Wildenstein	2:40.70
2004	Martaline	5	Gary Stevens	André Fabre	Khalid Abdullah	2:46.70
2005	Short Pause	6	Thierry Gillet	André Fabre	Khalid Abdullah	2:47.00
2006	Magadino	5	Brigitte Renk	Brigitte Renk	Adolf Renk	2:39.70
2007	Poet Laureate	3	Stéphane Pasquier	André Fabre	Sheikh Mohammed	2:38.80
2008	Magadino	7	Franck Blondel	Brigitte Renk	Adolf Renk	2:45.70
2009	Ideal World	4	Stéphane Pasquier	André Fabre	Khalid Abdullah	2:49.10
2010	Winter Dream	6	Ioritz Mendizabal	Robert Collet	Micheline Vidal	2:43.80
2011	Americain	6	Gérald Mossé	Alain de Royer-Dupré	Ryan / Bamford	2:47.62
2012	Tenenbaum	3	Maxime Guyon	André Fabre	Godolphin	2:50.20
2013	Tres Blue	3	Fabrice Veron	Henri-Alex Pantall	Horst Rapp	2:40.14
2014	Gatewood	6	William Buick	John Gosden	OTI Racing / Strawbridge	2:52.40
2015	Loresho	4	Christophe Soumillon	Jean-Claude Rouget	HH Aga Khan	2:41.71
2016	Ventura Storm	3	Gregory Benoist	Richard Hannon Jr.	Middleham Park Racing LXXII	2:44.37
2017	Tiberian	5	Olivier Peslier	Alain Couteil	Logis / Volz / Falk	2:40.60
2018	Finche	4	Vincent Cheminaud	André Fabre	Khalid Abdullah	2:43.12
2019	Ashrun	3	Stéphane Pasquier	Andreas Wohler	Stall Turffighter	2:42.69
2020	Skyward	4	Stéphane Pasquier	Fabrice Chappet	Messara / Curty	2:42.29
2021	Glycon	5	Cristian Demuro	Jean-Claude Rouget	Scea Haras De Saint Pair	2:48.64

== Earlier winners ==
- 1925: Cerfeuil
- 1926: Sang Froid
- 1927: Take My Tip
- 1928: Huntersdale
- 1929: Licteur
- 1930: Motrico
- 1931: Rieur
- 1932: Biltzalia
- 1933: Romarin
- 1934: Dark Pacha
- 1935: Jumbo
- 1936: Prince Rouge
- 1937: Magour
- 1938: Cardon
- 1939: Ribera
- 1941: Oxalis *
- 1942: Massinor *
- 1943: Oxyde *
- 1954: Arenys
- 1971: Uncanny
- 1972: Relate
- 1973: Primette
- 1976: Ashmore
- 1977: Campero

* The 1941, 1942 and 1943 runnings took place at Maisons-Laffitte.

== See also ==
- List of French flat horse races
