= Sea Moon =

British-bred Thoroughbred racehorse

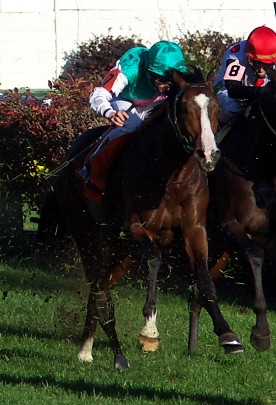
- Sea Moon at the 2011 Breeders' Cup Turf.
- Sire: Beat Hollow
- Grandsire: Sadler's Wells
- Dam: Eva Luna (USA)
- Damsire: Alleged
- Sex: Stallion
- Foaled: 6 March 2008
- Country: United Kingdom
- Colour: Bay
- Breeder: Juddmonte Farms
- Owner: Khalid Abdullah; Lloyd Williams
- Trainer: Michael Stoute; Robert Hickmott; John Oxx
- Record: 22:6-4-2
- Earnings: £791,602

Major wins
- Great Voltigeur Stakes (2011); Tapster Stakes (2012); Hardwicke Stakes (2012); Herbert Power Stakes (2013)

Sea Moon (foaled 6 March 2008) is a British-bred Thoroughbred racehorse. He was initially trained in Britain and as a three-year-old in 2011 he won the Great Voltigeur Stakes, was runner-up in the Breeders' Cup Turf and finished third in the St Leger. In 2012 he won the Hardwicke Stakes at Royal Ascot. In 2013 he was sold and sent to be trained in Australia where he won the Herbert Power Stakes. He returned to Europe for three races in 2015 before being retired to stud.

== Background ==
Sea Moon is a bay horse with a white blaze and three white socks, bred by his owner, Khalid Abdullah's Juddmonte Farms. Sea Moon is the best horse to date sired by Beat Hollow whose wins included the Grand Prix de Paris and the Arlington Million. His dam, Eva Luna (USA), won the Park Hill Stakes and became a highly successful broodmare: her progeny include the St Leger winner Brian Boru and Soviet Moon, the dam of Workforce.

Sea Moon was sent into training with Michael Stoute at Freemason Lodge stables at Newmarket, Suffolk. He has been ridden in most of his races by Ryan Moore. In January 2013 Sea Moon was sold to prominent Australian racehorse owner Lloyd Williams.

== Racing career ==
=== 2010: two-year-old season ===
Sea Moon made his first appearance on 12 October when he finished second in a one-mile maiden race at Leicester Racecourse. Two weeks later, he started at odds of 1/5 in a similar event at Great Yarmouth Racecourse and recorded his first victory, winning by a length from Little Rocky.

=== 2011: three-year-old season ===
Sea Moon did not appear as a three-year-old until 11 June when he appeared in a handicap race over 10 1/2 furlongs at York Racecourse. Carrying top weight of 133 pounds he took the lead inside the final furlong and won by 1 3/4 lengths from Flag Officer. After a break of two months, Sea Moon returned to York and was moved up in class to contest the Group Two Great Voltigeur Stakes, a recognised trial for the St Leger Stakes. Ridden by Richard Hughes in place of the injured Moore, Sea Moon took the lead in the final quarter mile and quickly drew clear of the field. Despite being eased near the finish he won by eight lengths from Al Kazeem. Marcus Armytage, writing in the Daily Telegraph, called the performance "a stunning display".

In the St Leger at Doncaster Racecourse on 10 September, Sea Moon, ridden by Olivier Peslier, was made 2/1 favourite ahead of the 1000 Guineas winner Blue Bunting. Peslier restrained the colt in the early stages before attempting to challenge in the straight. He was unable to obtain a clear run and was blocked twice before switching to the outside inside the final furlong. Sea Moon finished strongly but was beaten into third place behind Masked Marvel and Brown Panther. His performance divided press opinions: some considered him an unlucky loser, while others claimed that he never looked likely to win. On his final start of the year, Sea Moon was sent to the United States for the Breeders' Cup Turf at Churchill Downs. Moore held the colt towards the rear of the field before challenging for the lead in the straight. He finished second of the nine runners, beaten 2 1/4 lengths by St Nicholas Abbey.

=== 2012: four-year-old season ===
Sea Moon began his 2012 campaign in the Listed Southern Daily Echo Tapster Stakes on firm ground at Goodwood on 26 May. Starting the 2/7 favourite and held of the sustained challenge of Dandino to win by a head. In the Group Two Hardwicke Stakes at Royal Ascot four weeks later, he was made 2/1 favourite against a field which included the Melbourne Cup winner Dunaden. Racing on soft ground for the first time since his win in the Great Voltigeur, Sea Moon took the lead two furlongs from the finish and accelerated clear of the field to win by 3 1/4 lengths from Dunaden, with Red Cadeaux in third. After the win, Stoute announced that Sea Moon would return to Ascot for the King George VI and Queen Elizabeth Stakes a month later. Sea Moon started 2/1 favourite for the King George, but finished fifth of the ten runners behind Danedream. After a break of more than two months, Sea Moon returned in the Prix de l'Arc de Triomphe at Longchamp and finished eighth of the eighteen runners behind Solemia. In December, Sea Moon was sent to Hong Kong to contest the Hong Kong Vase but was withdrawn from the race after being diagnosed with a "blood abnormality".

=== 2013–2014: Australian career ===
In January 2013 Sea Moon was sold to Lloyd Williams and sent to race in Australia where he was trained by Robert Hickmott. Sea Moon did not appear on the racecourse until September, when he finished unplaced in the Makybe Diva Stakes and the Underwood Stakes. On 5 October at Flemington Racecourse he started favourite for the Bart Cummings Stakes over 2500 metres but was beaten a nose by Araldo. A week later he won his first race for his new owners when he won the Grade Two Herbert Power Stakes over 2400 m at Caulfield Racecourse. He was regarded as a leading contender for the Melbourne Cup and started 10/1 third favourite but finished unplaced behind Fiorente. He finished no better than fifth in his subsequent Australian races and in 2015 he returned to Europe to be trained in Ireland by John Oxx. Oxx reported that the horse became very ill on the voyage but recovered well and entered training in April.

=== 2015: seven-year-old season ===
Sea Moon made a promising comeback in August 2015 when he finished second to Order of St George in the Irish St. Leger Trial Stakes at the Curragh. In his two remaining starts (both at the Curragh) he came home seventh to Order of St George in the Irish St. Leger and then ended his career by running third in the Listed Finale Stakes at the on 11 October.

== Stud record ==
Sea Moon began his career as a breeding stallion at the Burgage Stud in County Carlow, Ireland in 2016.

== Assessment ==
In the 2011 World Thoroughbred Racehorse Rankings, Sea Moon was given a rating of 121, placing him 38th in the list.

== Pedigree ==
Pedigree of Sea Moon (GB), bay colt, 2008
Sire Beat Hollow (GB) 1997	Sadler's Wells; 1981	Northern Dancer	Nearctic
Sire Beat Hollow (GB) 1997	Sadler's Wells; 1981	Northern Dancer	Natalma
Sire Beat Hollow (GB) 1997	Sadler's Wells; 1981	Fairy Bridge	Bold Reason
Sire Beat Hollow (GB) 1997	Sadler's Wells; 1981	Fairy Bridge	Special
Sire Beat Hollow (GB) 1997	Wemyss Bight; 1990	Dancing Brave	Lyphard
Sire Beat Hollow (GB) 1997	Wemyss Bight; 1990	Dancing Brave	Navajo Princess
Sire Beat Hollow (GB) 1997	Wemyss Bight; 1990	Bahamian	Mill Reef
Sire Beat Hollow (GB) 1997	Wemyss Bight; 1990	Bahamian	Sorbus
Dam Eva Luna (USA) 1992	Alleged; 1974	Hoist the Flag	Tom Rolfe
Dam Eva Luna (USA) 1992	Alleged; 1974	Hoist the Flag	Wavy Navy
Dam Eva Luna (USA) 1992	Alleged; 1974	Princess Pout	Prince John
Dam Eva Luna (USA) 1992	Alleged; 1974	Princess Pout	Determined Lady
Dam Eva Luna (USA) 1992	Media Luna; 1981	Star Appeal	Appiani
Dam Eva Luna (USA) 1992	Media Luna; 1981	Star Appeal	Sterna
Dam Eva Luna (USA) 1992	Media Luna; 1981	Sounion	Vimy
Dam Eva Luna (USA) 1992	Media Luna; 1981	Sounion	Esquire Girl (Family: 14-c)
