= Admire Rakti =

Japanese-bred Thoroughbred racehorse

Admire Rakti アドマイヤラクティ
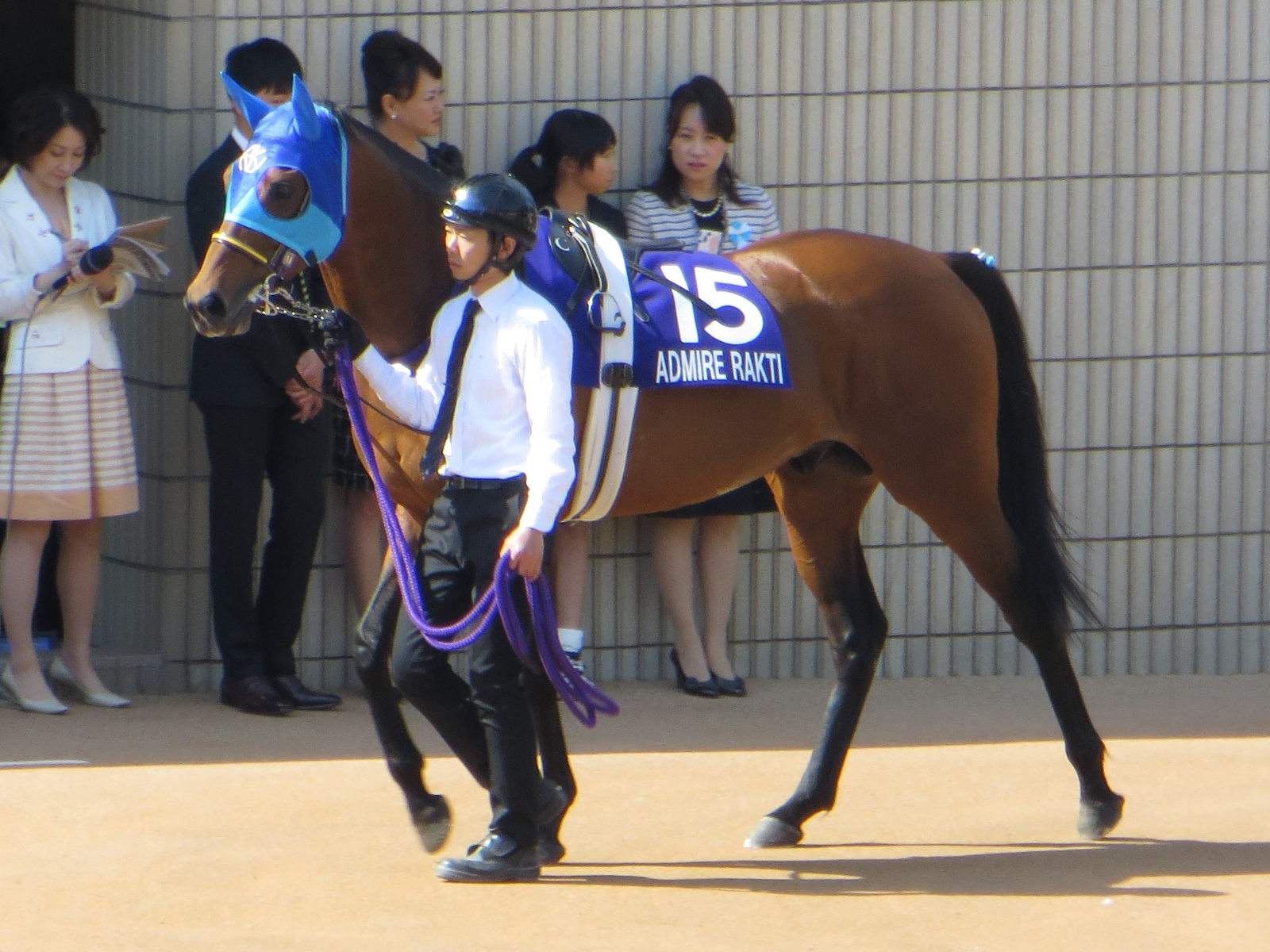
- Admire Rakti in Kyoto Racecourse (May 2014).
- Sire: Heart's Cry
- Grandsire: Sunday Silence
- Dam: Admire Teresa
- Damsire: Helissio
- Sex: Stallion
- Foaled: 20 February 2008; Japan
- Died: November 4, 2014 (aged 6); Flemington Racecourse, Melbourne, Victoria, Australia
- Country: Japan
- Colour: Bay
- Breeder: Northern Farm
- Owner: Riichi Kondo
- Racing colours
- Trainer: Tomoyuki Umeda
- Jockey: Zac Purton; Hiroyuki Uchida
- Record: 28: 7-6-5
- Earnings: $5,170,763

Major wins
- Diamond Stakes (2013); Caulfield Cup (2014)

Admire Rakti (Japanese: アドマイヤラクティ, Hepburn: Adomaiya Rakuti; 20 February 2008 – 4 November 2014) was a Japanese Thoroughbred racehorse who won the Diamond Stakes in Japan and the Caulfield Cup in Australia. He died in his stall just minutes after competing in the 154th Melbourne Cup on 4 November 2014.

== Background ==
Admire Rakti was a bay horse with a white star, bred in Japan by Northern Farm. He was from the first crop of foals sired by Heart's Cry, a horse whose wins included the Arima Kinen and the Dubai Sheema Classic. During his racing career Admire Rakti was owned by Riichi Kondo and trained by Tomoyuki Umeda.

== Racing career ==
=== 2010–2014: racing in Japan ===
Admire Rakti ran twice as a two-year-old in late 2010, winning an 1800-metre maiden race at Hanshin Racecourse on his second appearance on December 11. In the following year he ran seven times, recording his only success over 2000 metres at Hanshin in September. As a four-year-old he again contested seven races, winning twice at Nakayama Racecourse and taking the 2400 metre Koto Stakes when moved in distance at Kyoto in October. In his last two races of the year he was moved up in class to finish third in both the Listed Andromeda Stakes and the Grade II Kinko Sho.

As a five-year-old, Admire Rakti showed improved form and competed in some of the most prestigious races in Japan. After finishing third on his debut he was moved up in distance to 3400 metres and won the Diamond Stakes at Tokyo Racecourse, beating the 2010 Spring Tennō Shō winner Jaguar Mail by two and a half lengths. He failed to win in his remaining six races but finished fourth in both the Tennō Shō and the Japan Cup. In his first two starts of 2014 the horse finished second to Gold Ship at Hanshin before running unplaced in the Tennō Shō.

=== 2014: Australian campaign ===
In the autumn of 2014, Admire Rakti was sent to Australia, with the Melbourne Cup as his objective. On 18 October, he prepared for the race with a run in the Grade I Caulfield Cup over 2400 metres in which he was ridden by Hong Kong-based Australian Zac Purton. Eleven days before the race he had avoided serious injury after being involved in an incident at the Werribee quarantine station in which he was attacked by his training companion Admire Inazuma.

Starting at odds of 10/1 in the Caulfield Cup, Admire Rakti moved to the outside to make his challenge in the straight, took the lead in the closing stages, and won by half a length from the New Zealand filly Rising Romance, with the Australian favourite Lucia Valentina a further half length away in third place. After the race, his trainer Tomoyuki Umeda said, "I am so happy I am crying. A Japanese horse has never won this race before so I am so honoured to win this race. He had a handicap of 58kg [today] and hasn't done much big racing in Japan so we weren't sure how he would go, but possibly he likes Australia."

==== 2014 Melbourne Cup and death ====
Admire Rakti's victory at Caulfield meant that his weight for the Melbourne Cup was increased to 58.5 kg, a weight higher than any winner of the race had carried since Think Big in 1975. Admire Rakti started 9/2 favourite, but weakened badly in the last 600 metres and finished last of the twenty-two runners. Just five minutes after the race, he collapsed and died from cardiac arrest after ventricular fibrillation.

Following Admire Rakti's death, Purton commented "I knew he was in trouble when he didn't tow me into the race around halfway from home, so I eased him down straight away, the horse's welfare comes first. It's very sad. He gave me a great thrill at Caulfield and for this to happen to him is just not fair."

Admire Rakti's remains were interred at the Memorial Garden of Living Legends in Greenvale.

== Racing form ==
Admire Rakti won seven races and placed in another 11 out of 28 starts. This data is available in JBIS, netkeiba and racing.com.

Date	Track	Race	Grade	Distance (Condition)	Entry	HN	Odds (Favored)	Finish	Time	Margins	Jockey	Winner (Runner-up)
2010 – two-year-old season
Nov 14	Kyoto	2yo Newcomer		2,000 m (Firm)	9	3	3.4 (3)	2nd	2:04.6	0.1	Kota Fujioka	Plus Ultra
Dec 11	Hanshin	2yo Maiden		1,800 m (Firm)	13	9	2.2 (1)	1st	1:48.1	–0.2	Yasunari Iwata	(Susan Great)
2011 – three-year-old season
Jan 8	Kyoto	Fukujuso Tokubetsu	ALW (1W)	2,000 m (Firm)	14	11	5.7 (2)	6th	2:01.5	0.7	Yasunari Iwata	Cosmo Hager
Mar 20	Hanshin	Wakaba Stakes	OP	2,000 m (Firm)	16	5	34.3 (10)	5th	1:59.9	0.8	Yusuke Fujioka	Danon Mill
Apr 2	Hanshin	3yo Allowance	1W	2,400 m (Firm)	18	5	8.1 (6)	10th	2:27.0	1.6	Yusuke Fujioka	Carmine
Sep 24	Hanshin	3yo+ Allowance	1W	2,000 m (Firm)	14	9	6.9 (3)	1st	2:01.3	0.0	Yasunari Iwata	(Red Sheriff)
Oct 22	Kyoto	Kitano Tokubetsu	ALW (2W)	2,000 m (Firm)	7	5	4.3 (2)	2nd	1:58.4	0.0	Yusuke Fujioka	Danon Spasibo
Nov 13	Kyoto	Doncaster Cup	ALW (2W)	2,000 m (Firm)	10	3	3.5 (2)	3rd	1:59.6	0.6	Yuga Kawada	D'accord
Dec 10	Hanshin	Sakaiminato Tokubetsu	ALW (2W)	2,200 m (Firm)	7	3	2.1 (1)	3rd	2:16.4	0.5	Ioritz Mendizabal	All That Jazz
2012 – four-year-old season
Feb 15	Hanshin	Senriyama Tokubetsu	ALW (2W)	2,000 m (Firm)	13	6	5.5 (2)	2nd	2:02.9	0.0	Yasunari Iwata	Gentleman
Mar 10	Nakayama	Tateyama Tokubetsu	ALW (2W)	2,000 m (Heavy)	9	6	2.0 (1)	1st	2:08.9	–0.2	Yasunari Iwata	(Satono Emperor)
Apr 7	Nakayama	Wangan Stakes	ALW (3W)	2,200 m (Firm)	12	6	3.0 (1)	1st	2:13.8	0.0	Hiroyuki Uchida	(Satono Emperor)
Jun 10	Hanshin	Tarumi Stakes	ALW (3W)	2,000 m (Firm)	11	4	6.1 (3)	2nd	2:01.2	0.2	Yasunari Iwata	Lord of the Ring
Oct 20	Kyoto	Koto Stakes	ALW (3W)	2,400 m (Firm)	10	5	2.4 (1)	1st	2:24.9	0.0	Mirco Demuro	(Victory Star)
Nov 11	Kyoto	Andromeda Stakes	OP	2,000 m (Soft)	14	11	2.7 (2)	3rd	2:02.1	0.4	Mirco Demuro	Danon Ballade
Dec 1	Chukyo	Kinko Sho	2	2,000 m (Soft)	12	5	6.4 (4)	3rd	2:00.6	0.2	Mirco Demuro	Ocean Blue
2013 – five-year-old season
Jan 20	Nakayama	American Jockey Club Cup	2	2,200 m (Firm)	12	4	3.6 (2)	3rd	2:13.6	0.5	Hiroyuki Uchida	Danon Ballade
Feb 16	Tokyo	Diamond Stakes	3	3,400 m (Firm)	16	15	4.3 (1)	1st	3:31.9	–0.4	Hiroyuki Uchida	(Jaguar Mail)
Apr 28	Kyoto	Tenno Sho (Spring)	1	3,200 m (Firm)	18	7	21.7 (4)	4th	3:15.0	0.8	Yasunari Iwata	Fenomeno
May 26	Tokyo	Meguro Kinen	2	2,500 m (Firm)	18	8	3.8 (1)	10th	2:30.8	1.2	Yasunari Iwata	Mousquetaire
Oct 6	Kyoto	Kyoto Daishoten	2	2,400 m (Firm)	13	4	30.1 (5)	4th	2:23.2	0.3	Futoshi Komaki	Hit the Target
Nov 3	Tokyo	Copa Republica Argentina	2	2,500 m (Firm)	18	16	6.9 (4)	2nd	2:31.1	0.2	Ioritz Mendizabal	Asuka Kurichan
Nov 24	Tokyo	Japan Cup	1	2,400 m (Firm)	17	6	21.1 (4)	4th	2:26.2	0.1	Craig Williams	Gentildonna
Dec 22	Nakayama	Arima Kinen	1	2,500 m (Firm)	16	10	14.4 (3)	11th	2:35.3	3.0	Craig Williams	Orfevre
2014 – six-year-old season
Mar 23	Hanshin	Hanshin Daishoten	2	3,000 m (Firm)	9	8	15.6 (5)	2nd	3:07.2	0.6	Hirofumi Shii	Gold Ship
May 4	Kyoto	Tenno Sho (Spring)	1	3,200 m (Firm)	18	15	88.5 (10)	13th	3:16.2	1.1	Hirofumi Shii	Fenomeno
Oct 18	Caulfield	Caulfield Cup	1	2,400 m (Good)	18	1	–	1st	2:32.1	–0.1	Zac Purton	(Rising Romance)
Nov 4	Flemington	Melbourne Cup	1	3,200 m (Good)	22	1	– (1)	22nd	–	–	Zac Purton	Protectionist

Legend:
Turf

== Pedigree ==
Pedigree of Admire Rakti (JPN), 2008
Sire Heart's Cry 2001	Sunday Silence	Halo	Hail to Reason
Sire Heart's Cry 2001	Sunday Silence	Halo	Cosmah
Sire Heart's Cry 2001	Sunday Silence	Wishing Well	Understanding
Sire Heart's Cry 2001	Sunday Silence	Wishing Well	Mountain Flower
Sire Heart's Cry 2001	Irish Dance	Tony Bin	Kampala
Sire Heart's Cry 2001	Irish Dance	Tony Bin	Severn Bridge
Sire Heart's Cry 2001	Irish Dance	Buper Dance	Lyphard
Sire Heart's Cry 2001	Irish Dance	Buper Dance	My Bupers
Dam Admire Teresa 2000	Helissio	Fairy King	Northern Dancer
Dam Admire Teresa 2000	Helissio	Fairy King	Fairy Bridge
Dam Admire Teresa 2000	Helissio	Helice	Slewpy
Dam Admire Teresa 2000	Helissio	Helice	Hirondelle
Dam Admire Teresa 2000	Heed	Caveat	Cannonade
Dam Admire Teresa 2000	Heed	Caveat	Cold Hearted
Dam Admire Teresa 2000	Heed	Swan	Nijinsky
Dam Admire Teresa 2000	Heed	Swan	Her Demon
