= Gatewood (horse) =

British-bred Thoroughbred racehorse

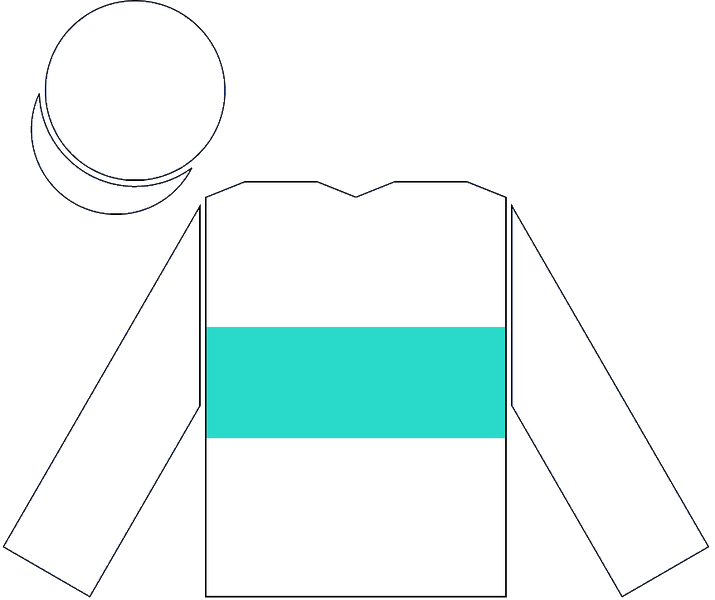
- Racing silks of George Strawbridge
- Sire: Galileo
- Grandsire: Sadler's Wells
- Dam: Felicity
- Damsire: Selkirk
- Sex: Stallion
- Foaled: 2008
- Country: United Kingdom
- Colour: Bay
- Breeder: George Strawbridge
- Owner: George Strawbridge
- Record: 27: 8-8-3
- Earnings: A$669,249

Major wins
- Geelong Cup (2012); Prix de Reux (2014); Buckhounds Stakes (2014); Tapster Stakes (2014)

Gatewood is a thoroughbred racehorse. A British horse with Australian connections, Gatewood was lightly raced and had plenty of potential. Australian owners OTI realised this potential in 2012 and approached US owner George Strawbridge to purchase the horse. After initially knocking them back, Strawbridge later offered OTI the opportunity to purchase a 50 percent share and they jumped at the chance.

OTI's Terry Henderson described the son of Galileo as a “progressive and beautifully bred horse” who was bought with the goal of chasing Melbourne Cup glory. After just seven career starts, Gatewood achieved victory four times and only missed out on a place on one occasion. Gatewood scored the first stakes victory of his career when winning the Listed Wolferton Handicap at Royal Ascot in June 2012.

Securing a total of eight wins and ten minor places from just 25 competitive starts, Gatewood travelled to Australian in 2012 and was entered in all the major spring features in 2012 with a view towards running in the Melbourne Cup, he took out the Geelong Cup (2400m) in just his second appearance but then failed to fire in his stints in Australia and failed to make the 2012 field for the Melbourne Cup. Remaining in Australia under the care of Chris Waller following his ill-fated 2012 Melbourne Cup campaign, Gatewood displayed a definite disdain for the Australian racing conditions and failed to make an impact over four starts through the 2013 Autumn Carnival.

Returning to Britain and the care of Gosden in late 2013, the Galileo entire ran second in the Conditions Stakes (2414m) before claiming back-to-back victories in the Listed Buckhounds Stakes (2414m) and Listed Tapster Stakes (2414m).

Overcoming poor running position to finish second in the Listed Fred Archer Stakes (2414m) on 28 June, Gatewood returned to the winner's circle in the Group 3 Prix De Reux (2500m) on 10 August before running a close second in the Group 2 Grand Prix De Deauville Lucien Barriere (2500m) last time out.

He finished in 12th place in the 2014 Melbourne Cup.

Gatewood retired to stud in Ireland in 2015. He is standing at John Lynch's Windmill view stud, Kiltormer, Ballinasloe, Co. Galway.
