= Protectionist (horse) =

German-bred Thoroughbred racehorse (2010–2023)

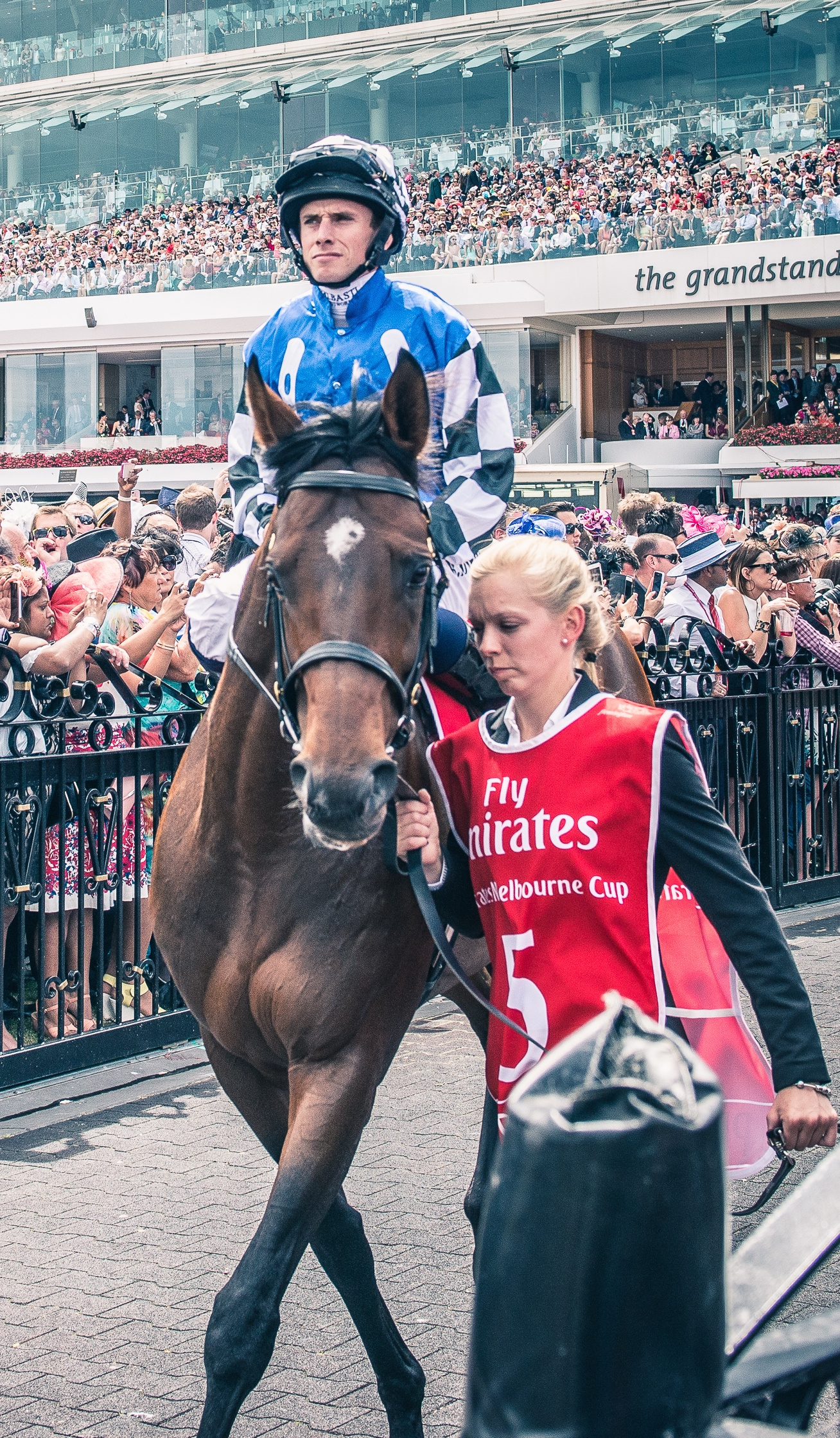
- Protectionist before the 2014 Melbourne Cup
- Sire: Monsun
- Grandsire: Königsstuhl
- Dam: Patineuse
- Damsire: Peintre Celebre
- Sex: Stallion
- Foaled: 21 March 2010
- Died: 14 November 2023 (aged 13)
- Country: Germany
- Colour: Bay
- Owner: Christoph Berglar; Australian Bloodstock
- Trainer: Andreas Wöhler
- Record: 21-8-3-1
- Earnings: A$4,397,929

Major wins
- Prix Kergorlay (2014); Hansa-Preis (2014, 2016); Melbourne Cup (2014); Grosser Preis von Berlin (2016)

Awards
- Australian Champion Stayer (2015)
- Last updated on 14 August 2016

Protectionist (21 March 2010 – 14 November 2023) was a Thoroughbred racehorse bred and trained in Germany. He was bred by Christoph Berglar, and owned by Berglar in conjunction with an Australian syndicate. Protectionist was the winner of the 2014 Melbourne Cup, ridden by Ryan Moore and trained by Andreas Wöhler, and became the first German-trained horse to win the race.

== Background ==
Protectionist was sired by Monsun, who also sired the 2013 Melbourne Cup winner, Fiorente. The horse was part-owned by his breeder, Christoph Berglar, and also by Australian Bloodstock, a syndicate based in Newcastle, New South Wales. Protectionist was the second foal out of the Peintre Celebre mare Patineuse. Protectionist died in November 2023, at the age of 13.

== Racing career ==
Protectionist won his first race in Hanover during his two-year-old season, and later in the season placed second in a Group 3 race in Krefeld, the Herzog von Ratibor-Rennen. He appeared only twice in his three-year-old season, winning one listed race and placing second in another. During his 2014 European campaign, Protectionist won two races from four starts. He ran second in the listed Preis von Dahlwitz and the Group 2 Großer Preis der Badischen Unternehmen, and then won back-to-back Group 2 victories in the Hansa-Preis (in Hamburg) and the Prix Kergorlay (in Deauville, France). He was ridden by Eduardo Pedroza for both wins.

Protectionist was brought to Australia for the 2014 Spring Racing Carnival, with his trainer, Andreas Wöhler, making his first appearance in Australia since he contested the 2004 Cox Plate with Paolini. Protectionist ran fourth in the Group 2 Herbert Power Stakes, ridden by Craig Williams, and was subsequently installed as an early favourite for the Melbourne Cup with some bookmakers, though this status was acquired by Admire Rakti closer to the race, after his win in the Caulfield Cup.

At the 2014 Melbourne Cup, Protectionist was ridden by British jockey Ryan Moore, who had won the Cox Plate on Adelaide ten days earlier. He won the 3,200-metre race by four lengths from Red Cadeaux, who become the first horse to place second in three Melbourne Cups. Protectionist is the first German-trained horse to win the race. He ran the race in 3:17.71, the fastest time since Media Puzzle in the 2002 race, and the fourth-fastest overall. His winning margin was the biggest victory since Doriemus won the 1995 race.

== Pedigree ==
Pedigree of Protectionist (GER), bay stallion, 2010
Sire Monsun	Königsstuhl	Dschingis Khan	Tamerlane
Sire Monsun	Königsstuhl	Dschingis Khan	Donna Diana
Sire Monsun	Königsstuhl	Königskrönung	Tiepoletto
Sire Monsun	Königsstuhl	Königskrönung	Krönung
Sire Monsun	Mosella	Surumu	Literat
Sire Monsun	Mosella	Surumu	Surama
Sire Monsun	Mosella	Monasia	Authi
Sire Monsun	Mosella	Monasia	Monacensia
Dam Patineuse	Peintre Celebre	Nureyev	Northern Dancer*
Dam Patineuse	Peintre Celebre	Nureyev	Special
Dam Patineuse	Peintre Celebre	Peinture Bleue	Alydar
Dam Patineuse	Peintre Celebre	Peinture Bleue	Petroleuse*
Dam Patineuse	Parisienne	Distant Relative	Habitat*
Dam Patineuse	Parisienne	Distant Relative	Royal Sister II
Dam Patineuse	Parisienne	Poughkeepsie	Sadler's Wells*
Dam Patineuse	Parisienne	Poughkeepsie	Pawneese

* Protectionist is inbred 4D x 5D to the stallion Northern Dancer, meaning that he appears fourth generation and fifth generation (via Sadler's Wells) on the dam side of his pedigree.

* Protectionist is inbred 4D x 5D to the stallion Habitat, meaning that he appears fourth generation and fifth generation (via Petroleuse) on the dam side of his pedigree.
