= Newcastle, New South Wales =

Newcastle Mulubinba
- City
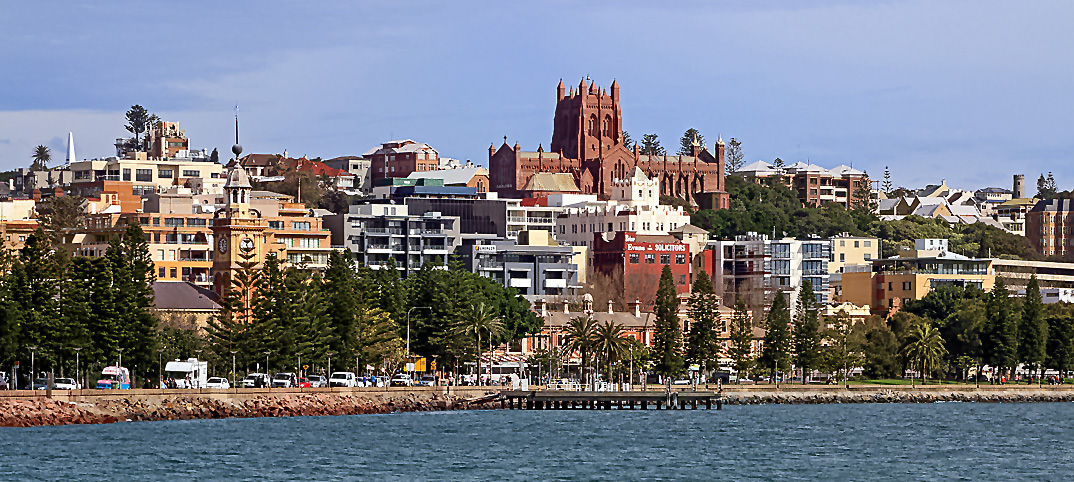
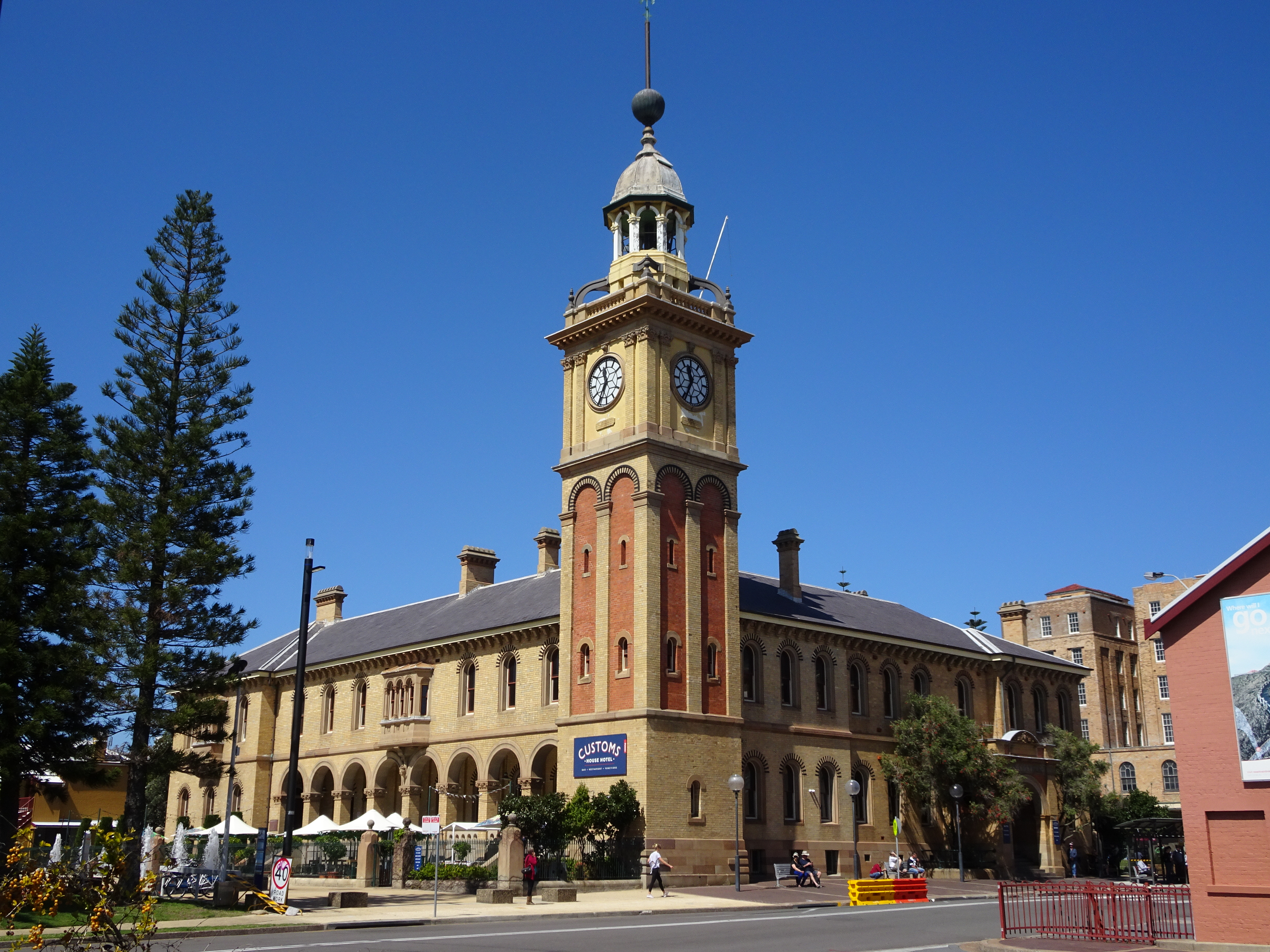
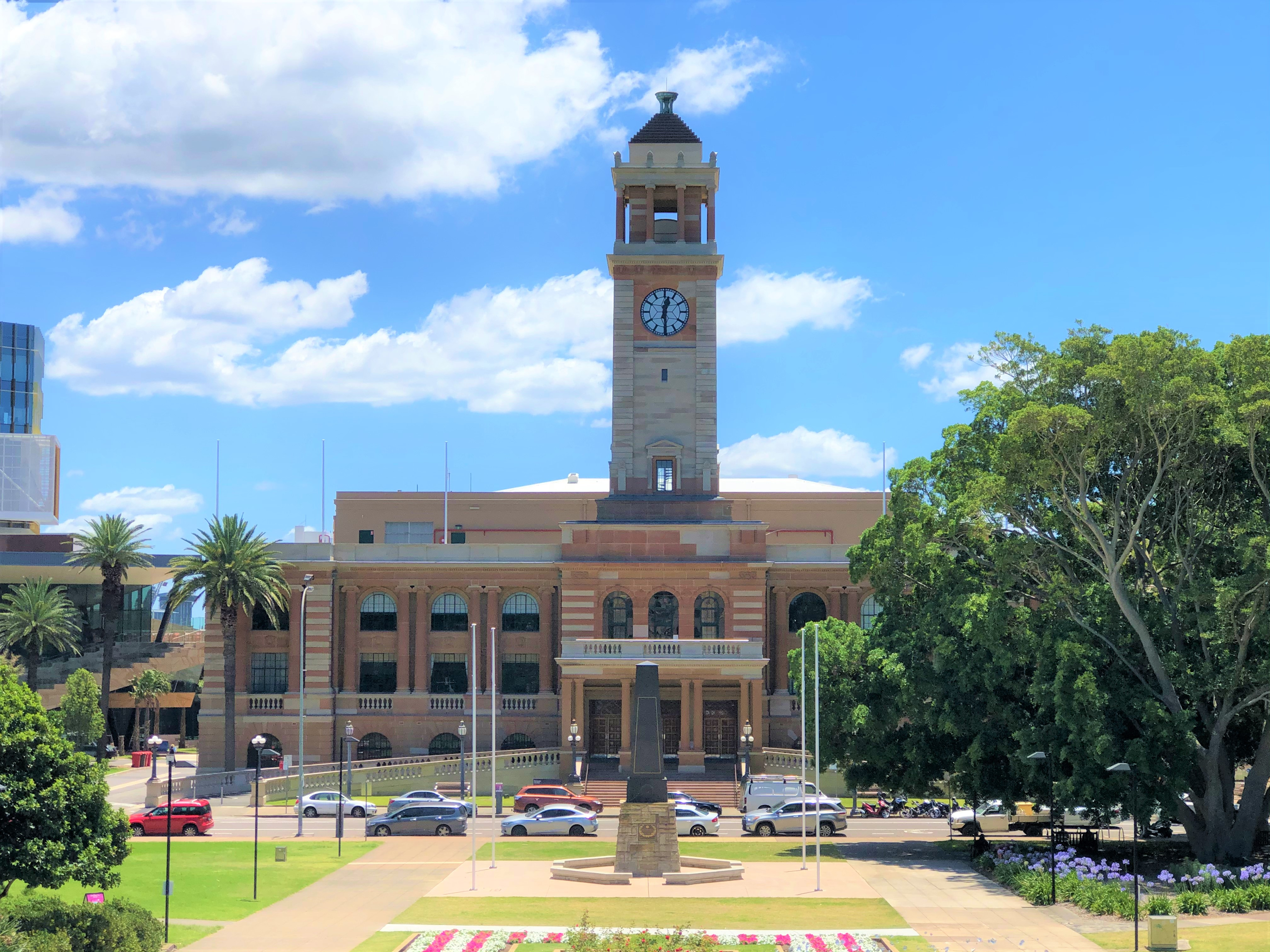
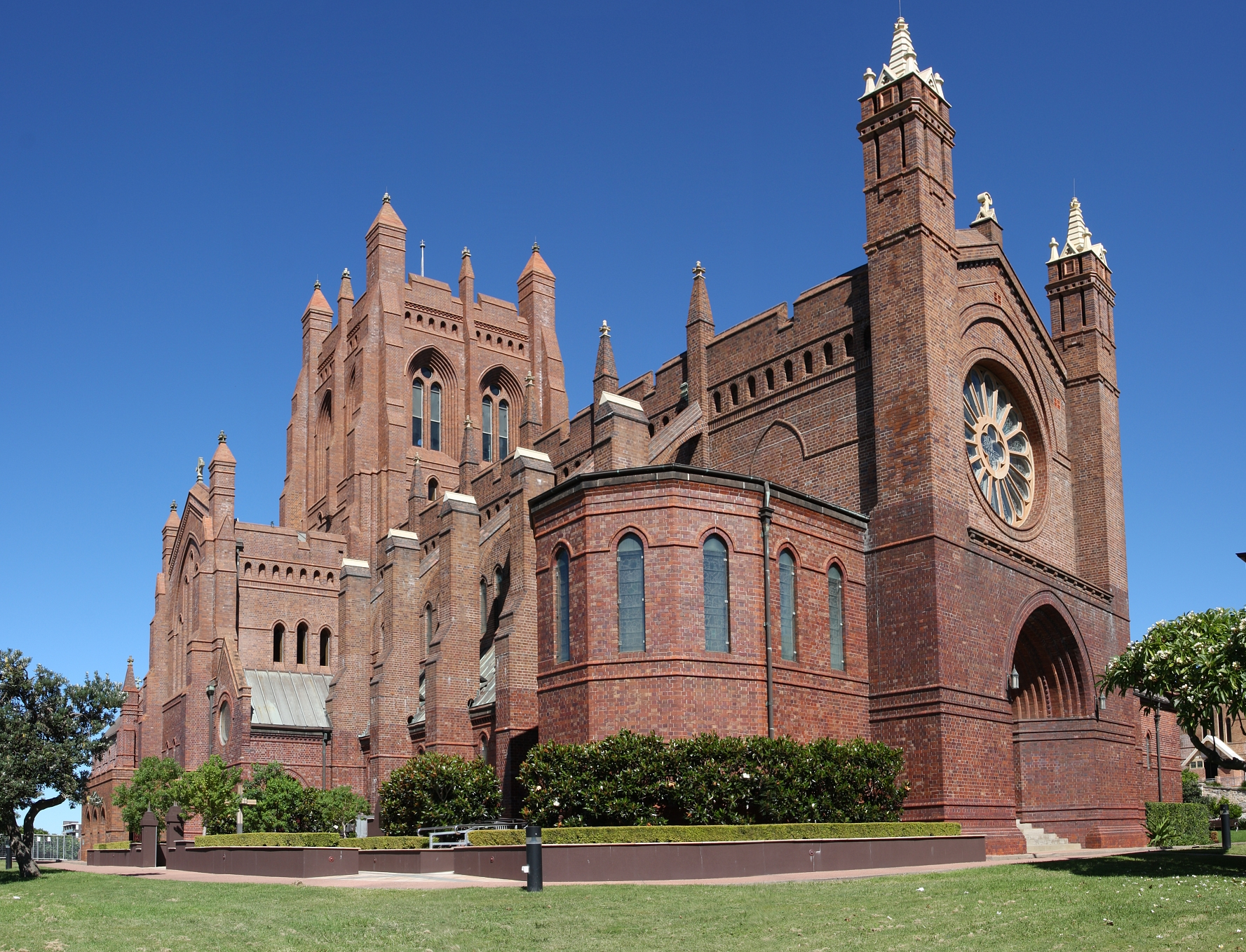
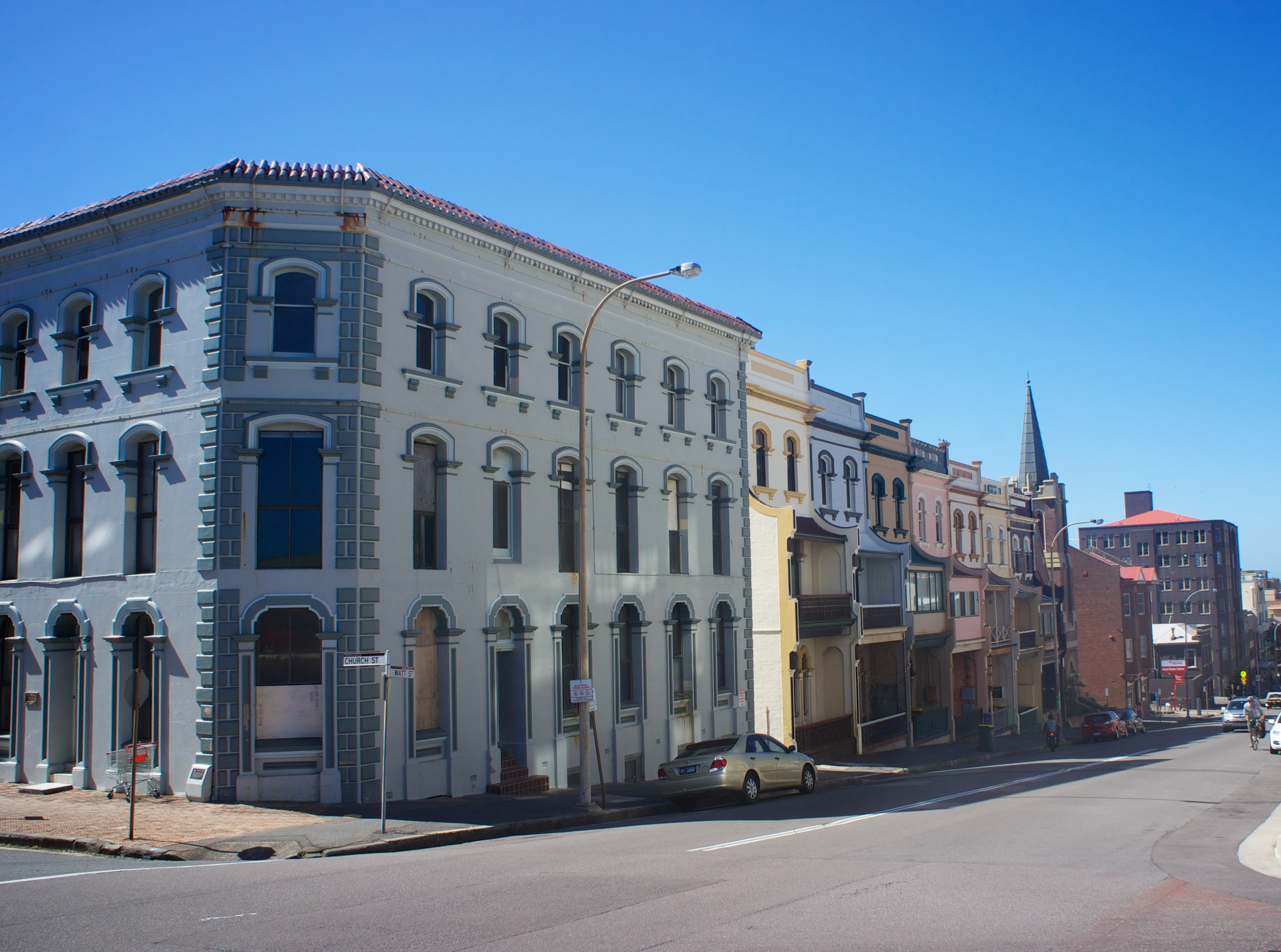
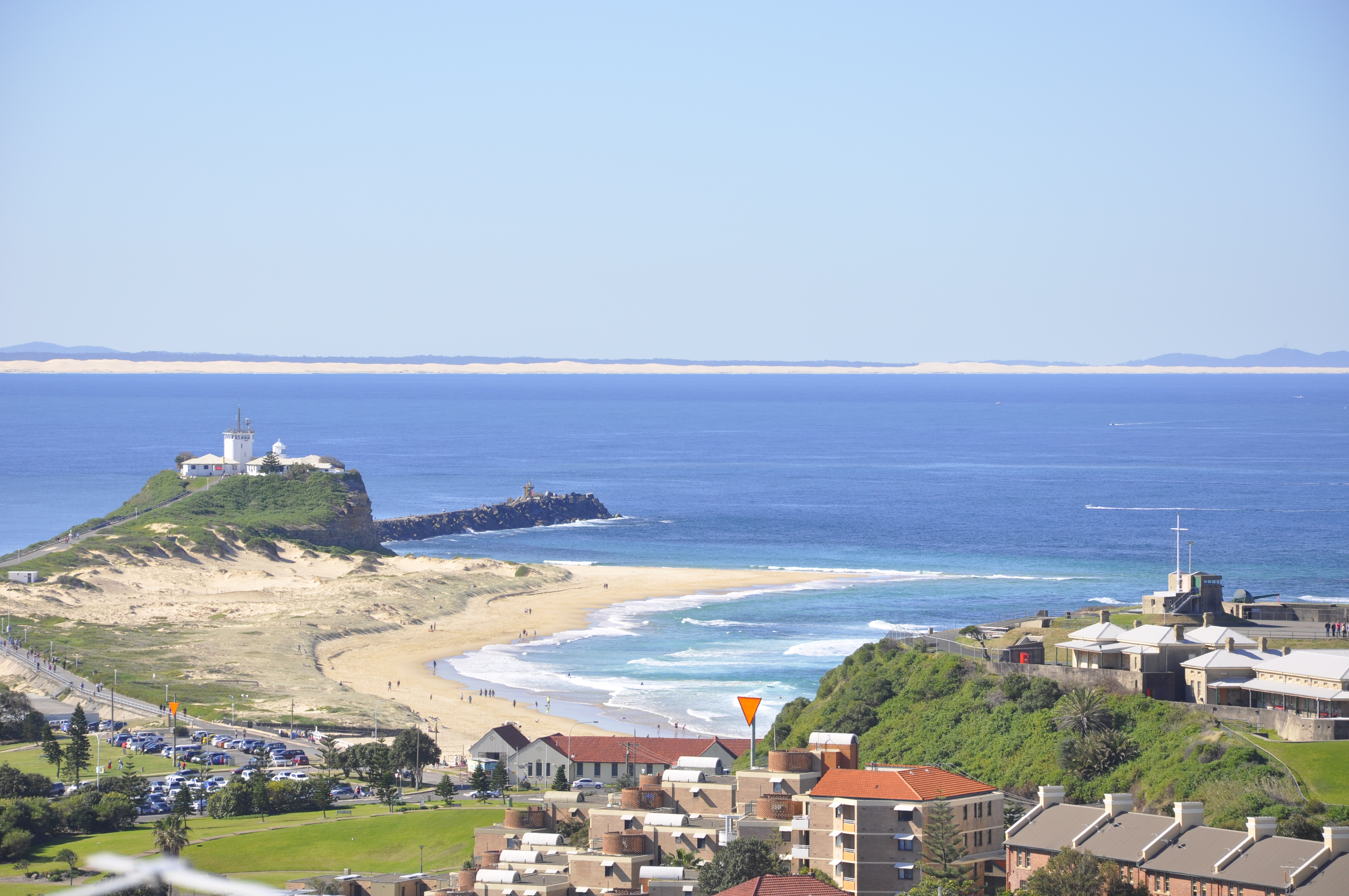
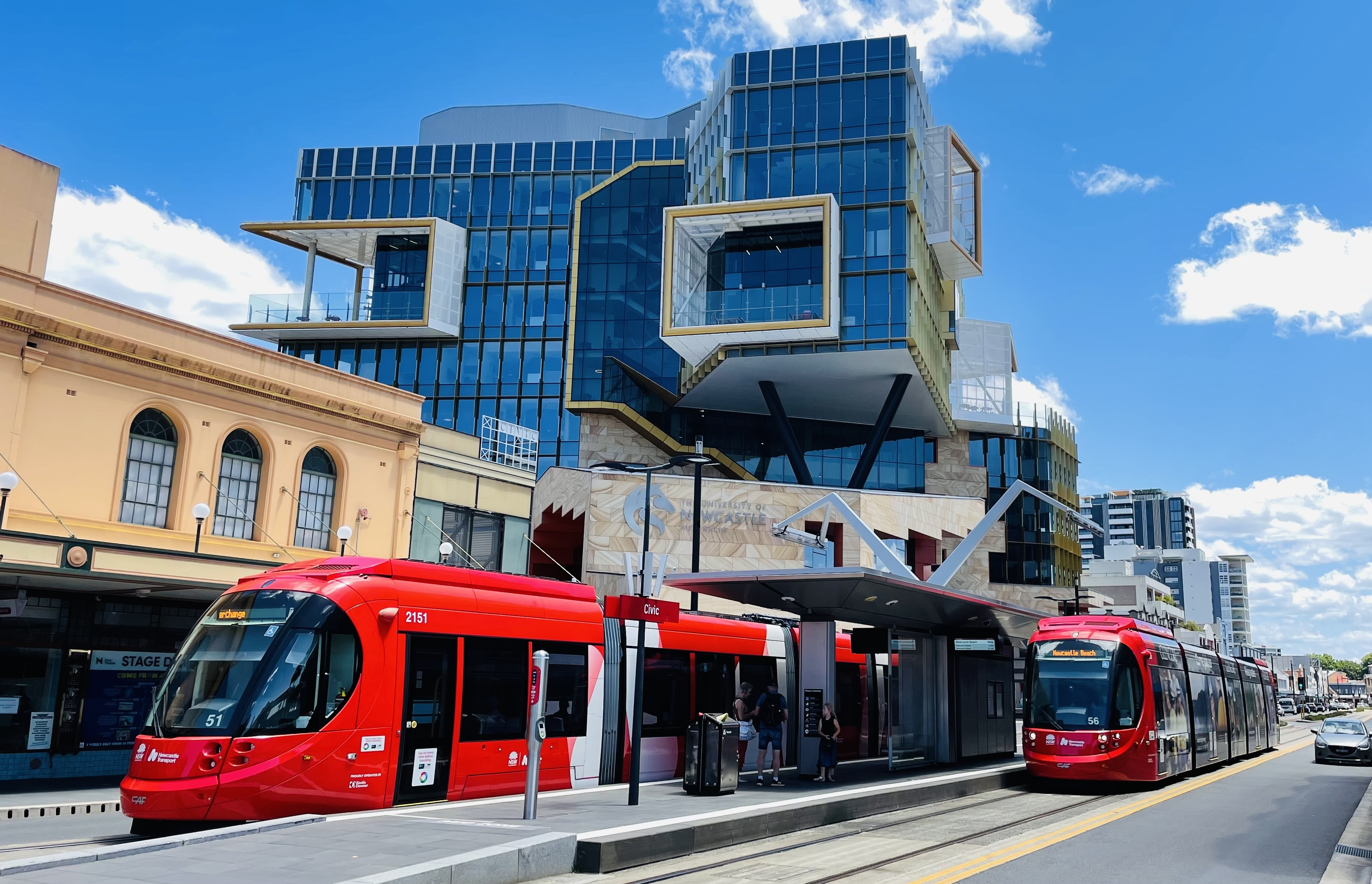
- Newcastle city centre Customs House City Hall Christ Church Cathedral Watt Street Terraces Nobbys Head Light Rail on Hunter Street

- Coordinates: 32°55′50″S 151°45′15″E
- Country: Australia
- State: New South Wales
- Region: Hunter
- LGAs: City of Newcastle; City of Lake Macquarie; City of Maitland; City of Cessnock; Port Stephens Council
- Location: 162 km (101 mi) NNE of Sydney; 791 km (492 mi) SSW of Brisbane; 86 km (53 mi) NE of Gosford; 166 km (103 mi) SSW of Forster; 78 km (48 mi) SE of Singleton
- Established: 1804

Government
  - State electorate: *Cessnock; Charlestown; Lake Macquarie; Newcastle; Port Stephens; Swansea; Wallsend
  - Federal divisions: Newcastle; Hunter; Paterson; Shortland

Area
  - Total: 1,179.1 km^{2} (455.3 sq mi)
- Elevation: 9 m (30 ft)

Population
  - Totals: 508,437 (2021 census)(Significant Urban Area) (7th); 348,539 (2021 census)(Urban Centre)
  - Density: 431.208/km^{2} (1,116.82/sq mi)
- Time zone: UTC+10:00 (AEST)
  - Summer (DST): UTC+11:00 (AEDT)
- County: Northumberland
- Mean max temp: 22.2 °C (72.0 °F)
- Mean min temp: 15.1 °C (59.2 °F)
- Annual rainfall: 1,034.5 mm (40.73 in)

Newcastle, also known as Greater Newcastle (locally /ˈnjuːkɑːsəl/ NEW-kah-səl; Awabakal: Mulubinba), is a large metropolitan area and the second-most-populous such area of New South Wales, Australia. It includes the cities of Newcastle and Lake Macquarie and it is the hub of the Lower Hunter region, which includes most parts of the cities of Newcastle, Lake Macquarie, Maitland, Cessnock, and Port Stephens Council. Newcastle is also known by its colloquial nickname, Newy. A Newcastle resident can also be known as a Novocastrian.

Located at the mouth of the Hunter River, it is the predominant city within the Hunter Region. Famous for its coal, Newcastle is the largest coal exporting harbour in the world, exporting 143 million tonnes of coal in 2022. Beyond the city, the Hunter Region possesses large coal deposits. Geologically, the area is located in the central-eastern part of the Sydney Basin.

== History ==
=== Aboriginal history ===
Newcastle and the lower Hunter Region were traditionally occupied by the Awabakal and Worimi Aboriginal people, who called the area Malubimba.

Based on Aboriginal-language references documented in maps, sketches and geological descriptions, eight landmarks have been officially dual-named by the NSW Geographic Names Board with their traditional Aboriginal names. They include Nobbys Head also known as Whibayganba; Flagstaff Hill also known as Tahlbihn; Pirate Point also known as Burrabihngarn; Port Hunter also known as Yohaaba; Hunter River (South Channel) also known as Coquun; Shepherds Hill also known as Khanterin; Ironbark Creek also known as Toohrnbing and Hexham Swamp also known as Burraghihnbihng.

=== British exploration ===
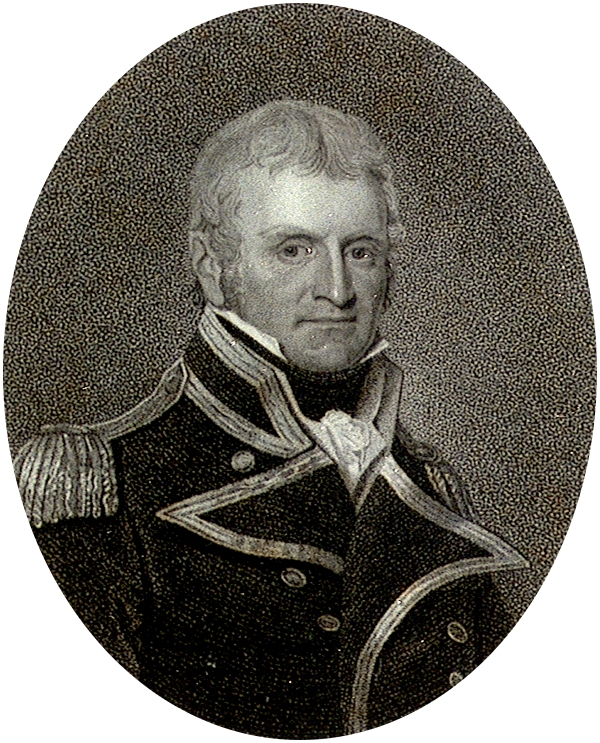
Lieutenant John Shortland, British explorer of the Newcastle region

In June 1796, a group of fishermen from the British convict outpost at Sydney, were driven by bad weather into a harbour at what is now Newcastle. They found considerable amounts of coal lying on the ground near the beach, some of which they brought back to Sydney. The fishermen had "conducted themselves improperly" while ashore and gotten into conflict with the local Aboriginal people. Two of the fishermen were wounded, one of them fatally.

Over a year later, in September 1797, Lieutenant John Shortland explored the area and named the Hunter River. This was largely accidental, as he had been sent to the region in search of a number of convicts who had seized a vessel called Cumberland while it was sailing from Sydney Cove. Lieutenant Shortland entered what he later described as "a very fine river", which he named after New South Wales' Governor John Hunter. He returned with reports of the deep-water port and the area's abundant resources of coal and cedar.

=== Early coal and cedar operations ===
Over the next two years, influential colonists like Simeon Lord and James Underwood sent vessels and workers to the region to extract the valuable coal and cedarwood. Some of these workers skirmished with local Awabakal men, and an armed party under Henry Hacking was dispatched to investigate, which resulted in the shooting of several Aboriginal people. Coal mined from the area was the New South Wales colony's first export.

=== First attempt at British settlement ===
In 1800, fifteen convicts seized a small supply ship from the Hawkesbury River and sailed it to the mouth of the Hunter River where it was wrecked. Three of the surviving convicts became the area's first British residents when they were adopted into a local Aboriginal clan. A year later, Philip Gidley King, the Governor of New South Wales, decided to send a surveying expedition under Colonel William Paterson and Francis Barrallier to assess the feasibility of establishing an official settlement. Paterson returned with a positive account outlining the cedar and coal resources, and also the massive loads of oyster shell middens which could be utilised for much needed lime mortar.

Subsequently, later in 1801, a convict camp called King's Town (named after the governor) was established to mine coal and cut timber. The convicts, numbering under twenty, were treated harshly and mutinied twice in six months before Governor King decided to abandon the settlement in February 1802.

=== Newcastle convict colony ===
==== Establishment ====
A convict settlement was again attempted in 1804, as a place of secondary punishment for unruly convicts. The settlement was named Coal River, also Kingstown and then renamed Newcastle, after the English city. The name first appeared by the commission issued by Governor King on 15 March 1804 to Lieutenant Charles Menzies of the marine detachment on HMS Calcutta, then at Port Jackson, appointing him superintendent of the new settlement.

The first consignment, consisting of 34 convicts and a military guard, arrived at the Hunter River on 27 March 1804 in three ships: HMS Lady Nelson, the Resource and the James. The convicts were Irish rebels from the 1804 Castle Hill convict rebellion. Newcastle gained a reputation as a "hellhole" as it was a place where the most dangerous convicts were sent to dig in the coal mines as harsh punishment for their crimes. The link with Newcastle upon Tyne, England (its namesake) and also whence many of the 19th-century coal miners came, is still obvious in some of the place-names—such as Jesmond, Hexham, Wickham, Wallsend and Gateshead. Morpeth, New South Wales is a similar distance north of Newcastle as Morpeth, Northumberland is north of Newcastle upon Tyne.

In 1805, Menzies resigned as commandant, with Cadwallader Draffin being promoted to the role. He was soon found to be mentally unstable and in turn was quickly replaced by the medical officer of the settlement, Charles Throsby. Throsby brought order and discipline to the convict colony, where the prisoners were set to work securing coal, cedar and salt from sunrise to sunset.

==== Development ====
In 1808, Lieutenant William Lawson was appointed as commandant. Lawson was a member of the Rum Corps who overthrew Governor William Bligh. Associates of Bligh, such as Henry Browne Hayes were sent as convicts to Newcastle where Lawson treated them harshly. Under Lawson, the severe work of manual limeburning was commenced, where the convicts were forced to burn and carry caustic unslaked lime through seawater to load onto barges.

Lawson was replaced in 1810 and a period of relatively merciful administration followed under the command of several military officers. In early 1816, Newcastle's first school opened with seventeen pupils in attendance.

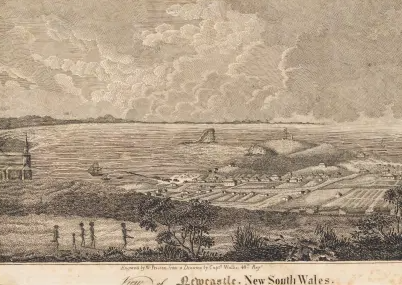
Sketch of the Newcastle settlement in 1818 by Captain James Wallis

Under Captain James Wallis, commandant from 1816 to 1818, the convicts' conditions improved, and a building boom began. Captain Wallis laid out the streets of the town, built the first church of the site of the present Christ Church Cathedral, erected the old gaol on the seashore, and began work on the breakwater which now joins Nobbys Head to the mainland. The quality of these first buildings was poor, and only the (much reinforced) breakwater survives. Wallis also established a female factory on Nobbys Head for insubordinate women convicts. This scheme was short-lived due to the terrible conditions endured by the women.

==== Increased severity under Major Morisset ====
A major enquiry beginning in 1819, led by John Bigge, investigated the management of the British convict colonies in Australia. Bigge recommended that the treatment of convicts be more severe to act as an increased deterrent to crime. Major James Morisset was appointed commandant at Newcastle in 1819 and a subsequent increase in harsh punishments of the convicts occurred. Floggings and solitary confinement became more common, and unruly female convicts were placed in neck irons and worked in chain gangs. Morisset had a flogging apparatus built into his boat to act as a mobile place of punishment when he toured the farms along the Hunter River worked with convict labourers. Convicts who laboured in the cramped underground coal mines were each expected to produce up to two and a half tons of coal per day. The shafts were consistently knee-deep with water and the convicts had to remain in their wet clothing. Despite being overworked and having insufficient rations and poor housing, Morisset had the convicts carve him an ocean bath (termed the Bogey Hole) into the rock shelf near Newcastle.

Morisset also increased surveillance around Newcastle to locate and capture runaway convicts. He established a military outpost in Port Stephens at a place which is still called Soldier's Point. He also expanded the use of local Aboriginal men to act as trackers to locate, disable and sometimes kill fugitive convicts. Men such as Biraban, Burigon and Bob Barrett became well-known in this role and were reviled by the convicts. When Burigon was murdered by prisoner John Kirby, Morisset had the convict arrested and charged. Kirby was later executed.

==== Closure of the convict settlement ====
Newcastle became open to free settlement from 1822. The large agricultural corporation, the Australian Agricultural Company, took up its immense land grant north of Port Stephens in 1824, while wealthy colonists around the same time starting carving out estates along the upper Hunter River. Prisoner numbers were gradually reduced from around 1,000 to 100 (most of these were employed on the building of the breakwater), and the remaining 900 were sent to the newly-formed penal colony at Port Macquarie. The convict colony at Newcastle was closed in 1826.

=== Civilian government and onwards ===
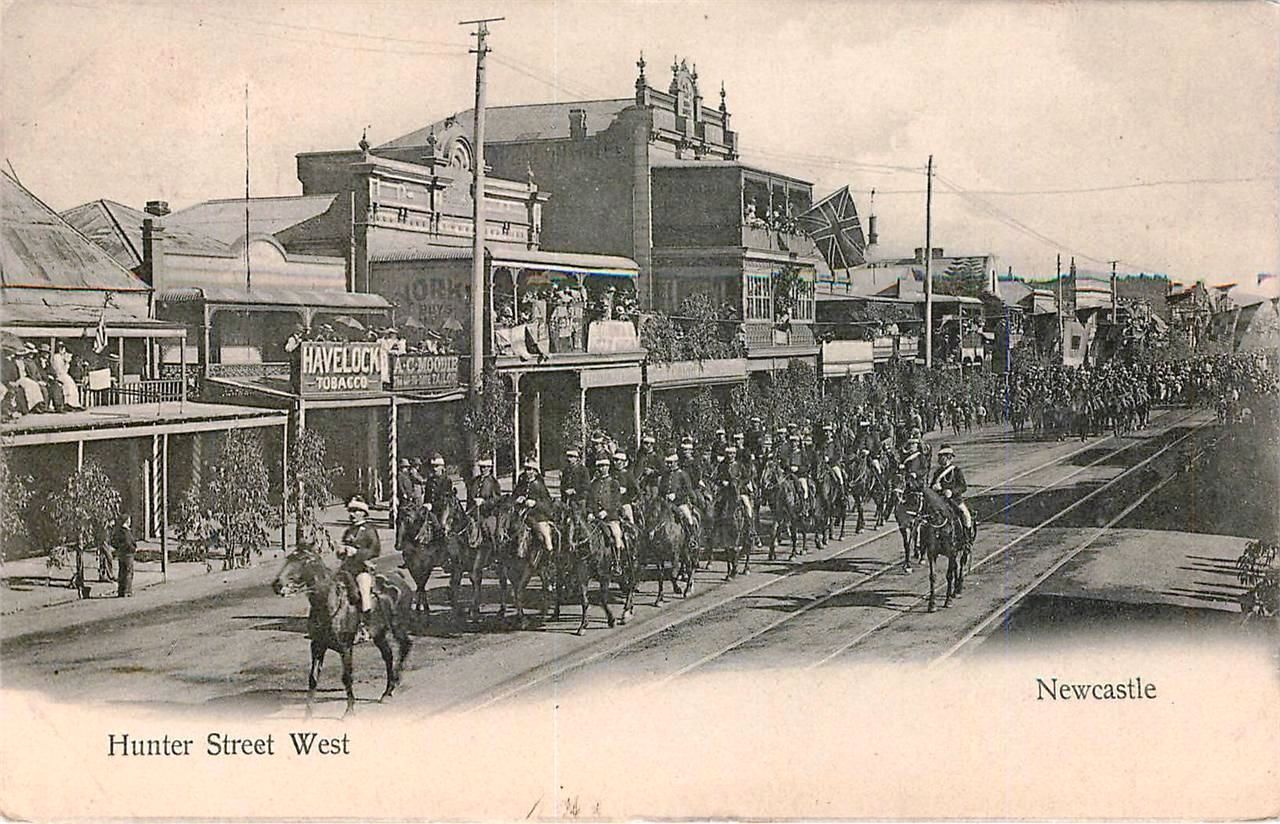
A parade of mounted soldiers along Hunter Street, c. 1908

After the closure of the convict settlement in 1826, the town was freed from the infamous influence of penal law. It began to acquire the aspect of a typical British colonial settlement, and a steady flow of colonists and their convict labourers poured into the hinterland. However, Newcastle itself initially faced a decrease in population with an observer stating in 1827, that the number of Aboriginal people in the township at least equalled that of the white population.

During the nineteenth century the formation of the Newcastle & Hunter River Steamship Company saw the establishment of regular steamship services from Morpeth and Newcastle with Sydney. The company had a fleet of freighters as well as several fast passenger vessels, including the PS Newcastle and the PS Namoi. The Namoi had first-class cabins with the latest facilities.

Because of the coal supply, small ships plied between Newcastle and Sydney, Brisbane, Melbourne and Adelaide, carrying coal to gas works and bunkers for shipping, and railways. These were commonly known as sixty-milers, referring to the nautical journey between Newcastle and Sydney. These ships continued in service until recent times.

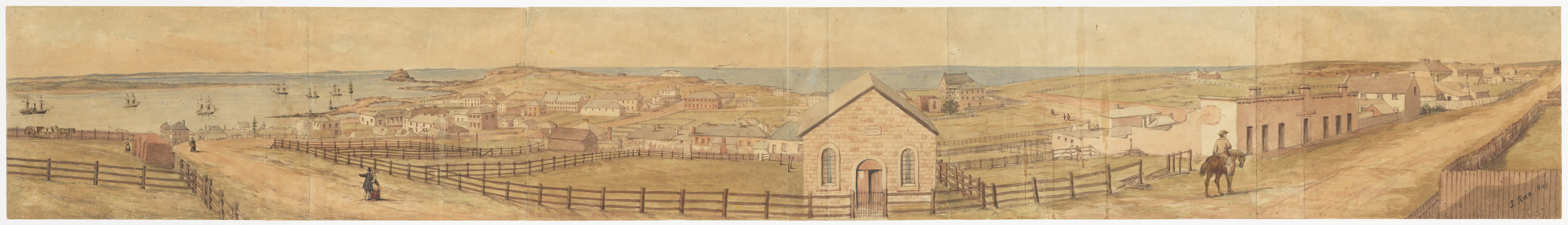
Panorama of Newcastle, Australia, 1849, by John Rae

=== 1920s to present ===
During World War II, Newcastle was an important industrial centre for the Australian war effort. In 1942, the Japanese planned to attack Sydney Harbour. On the early hours of 8 June, the Japanese submarine I-21 briefly shelled Newcastle. Among the areas hit within the city were dockyards, the Newcastle Steelworks, Parnell Place in the city's East End, the breakwall and Art Deco Ocean baths. There were no casualties in the attack and damage was minimal.

The MS Princess of Tasmania prior to being launched at the State Dockyard in November 1958

The Port of Newcastle remains the economic and trade centre for the resource-rich Hunter Valley and for much of the north and north-west of New South Wales. Newcastle is the world's largest coal export port and Australia's oldest and second-largest tonnage throughput port, with over 3,000 shipping movements handling cargo of 95.8 Mt per annum, of which coal exports represented 90.8 Mt in 2008–09. The volume of coal exported, and attempts to increase coal exports, are opposed by environmental groups including Newcastle-based Rising Tide Australia. These have undertaken various protests targeting the export of coal from the city, such as in 2023 when 3000 people took part in a water based blockade and 109 were arrested.

Newcastle had a shipbuilding industry with the Walsh Island Dockyard & Engineering Works, State Dockyard and Forgacs Shipyard. In recent years the only major ship-construction contract awarded to the area was the construction of the Huon-class minehunters. The era of extensive heavy industry passed when the steel works closed in 1999. Many of the remaining manufacturing industries have located themselves well away from the city itself.

A tram halts outside the AMP building at the eastern end of Hunter Street, 1947.

A bustling Hunter Street, 1968

Newcastle has one of the oldest theatre districts in Australia. Victoria Theatre on Perkins Street is the oldest purpose-built theatre in the country. The theatre district that occupied the area around what is now Hunter Street vanished during the 1940s. The old city centre has seen some new apartments and hotels built in recent years, but the rate of commercial and retail occupation remains low while alternate suburban centres have become more important. The CBD itself is shifting to the west, towards the major urban renewal area known as "Honeysuckle". This renewal, to run for another 10 years, is a major part of arresting the shift of business and residents to the suburbs. Commercial renewal has been accompanied by cultural renaissance. There is a vibrant arts scene in the city including a highly regarded art gallery, and an active Hunter Writers' Centre. Recent fictional representations (for example Antoinette Eklund's Steel River) present a new vision of the city, using the city's historic past as a backdrop for contemporary fiction.

The old central business district, located at Newcastle's eastern end, still has a considerable number of historic buildings, dominated by Christ Church Cathedral, seat of the Anglican Bishop of Newcastle. Other noteworthy buildings include Fort Scratchley, the Ocean Baths, the old Customs House, the 1920s City Hall, the 1890s Longworth Institute (once regarded as the finest building in the colony) and the 1930s art deco University House (formerly NESCA House, seen in the film Superman Returns).

== Geography ==
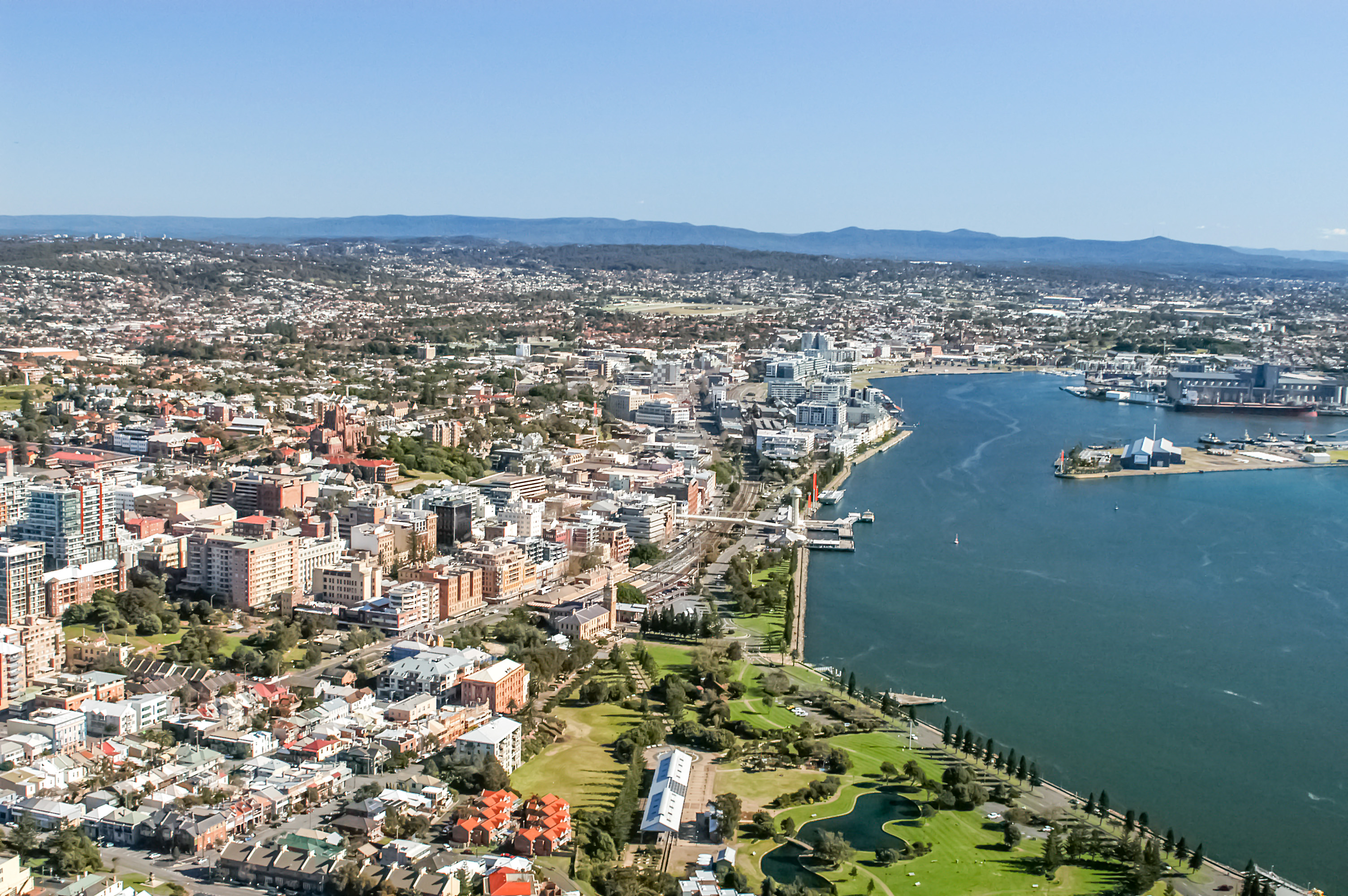
An aerial view of central Newcastle and its surrounding metropolitan area, situated on the Hunter River

Newcastle is on the southern bank of the Hunter River mouth. The northern side is dominated by sand dunes, swamps and multiple river channels. A "green belt" protecting plant and wildlife flanks the city from the west (Watagan Mountains) around to the north where it meets the coast just north of Stockton. Urban development is mainly restricted to the hilly southern bank. The small town of Stockton sits opposite central Newcastle at the river mouth and is linked by ferry. Road access between Stockton and central Newcastle is via the Stockton Bridge, a distance of 20 km (12 mi). Much of the city is undercut by the coal measures of the Sydney sedimentary basin, and what were once numerous coal-mining villages located in the hills and valleys around the port have merged into a single urban area extending southwards to Lake Macquarie. The Greater Newcastle area is situated right between the Central Coast and Mid North Coast regions, with the Central Coast bordering in the south and the Mid North Coast bordering in the north as well as other Hunter local government areas (outside of Newcastle) bordering in the west and north-west.

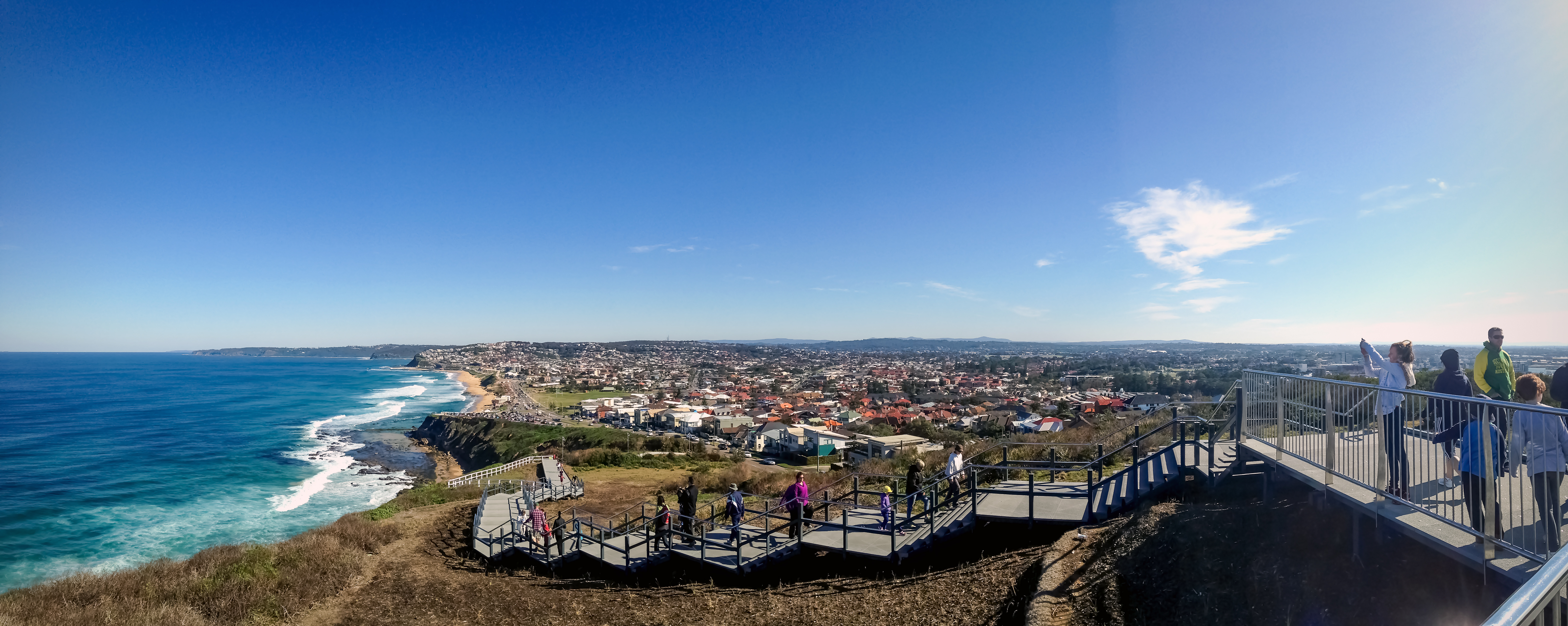
The ANZAC Walk, looking towards Merewether and the outer suburbs

=== Parks ===
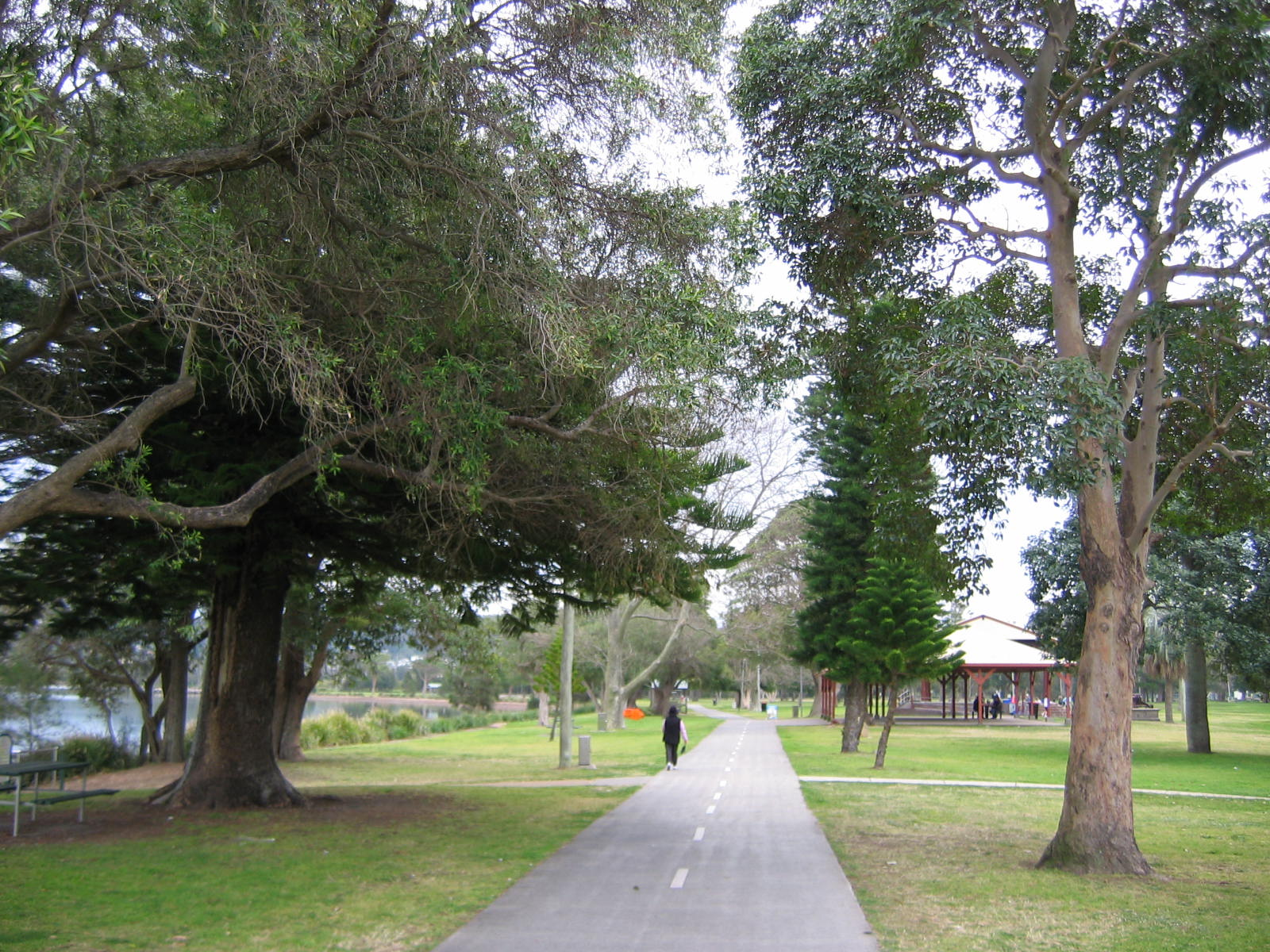
Speers Point Park

Newcastle has several public parks including King Edward Park, which was designated in 1863. Features of the park include coastal views, a sunken garden and a Victorian rotunda.

=== Climate ===
Newcastle has a humid subtropical climate (Cfa) that is typical of the Australian east coast. Precipitation is heaviest in late autumn and early winter, while the second half of the year is slightly drier on average. The climate is generally moderated by the Pacific Ocean to the east. Summers are mostly warm and humid with periods of very dry and hot weather occasionally due to hot west to north-westerly winds, which can bring temperatures in excess of 40 °C (104 °F). The highest recorded temperature was 42.5 °C (108.5 °F) on 18 January 2013 at the Nobbys Head weather station.

Winters are generally mild with drier conditions than summer on average. Cold fronts affect the area and sometimes bring strong westerly winds behind them, but due to the foehn effect they generally provide clear conditions as the region lies leeward of the Great Dividing Range. The lowest recorded temperature was 1.8 °C (35.2 °F) on 27 July 1986. East coast lows also impact Newcastle, sometimes delivering winds well above 100 km/h (62 mph) and torrential rainfall, usually lasting a couple of days. The east coast low in May 1974, the 2007 New South Wales storms and April 2015 are extreme examples of this type of weather.

Climate data for Newcastle (Nobbys Signal Station AWS), New South Wales, Australia (1991–2020 normals, 1862–present extremes); 33 m AMSL
Month	Jan	Feb	Mar	Apr	May	Jun	Jul	Aug	Sep	Oct	Nov	Dec	Year
Record high °C (°F)	42.5 (108.5)	40.9 (105.6)	39.0 (102.2)	36.8 (98.2)	28.5 (83.3)	26.1 (79.0)	26.3 (79.3)	29.9 (85.8)	34.4 (93.9)	36.7 (98.1)	41.0 (105.8)	42.0 (107.6)	42.5 (108.5)
Mean daily maximum °C (°F)	25.7 (78.3)	25.6 (78.1)	24.8 (76.6)	23.3 (73.9)	20.7 (69.3)	18.3 (64.9)	17.8 (64.0)	19.0 (66.2)	21.1 (70.0)	22.6 (72.7)	23.3 (73.9)	24.7 (76.5)	22.2 (72.0)
Mean daily minimum °C (°F)	20.1 (68.2)	20.1 (68.2)	18.8 (65.8)	15.9 (60.6)	12.7 (54.9)	10.6 (51.1)	9.4 (48.9)	10.1 (50.2)	12.6 (54.7)	15.0 (59.0)	16.8 (62.2)	18.7 (65.7)	15.1 (59.1)
Record low °C (°F)	12.0 (53.6)	10.3 (50.5)	11.1 (52.0)	7.4 (45.3)	4.7 (40.5)	3.0 (37.4)	1.8 (35.2)	3.3 (37.9)	5.0 (41.0)	6.5 (43.7)	7.2 (45.0)	11.0 (51.8)	1.8 (35.2)
Average precipitation mm (inches)	70.2 (2.76)	109.7 (4.32)	113.5 (4.47)	109.0 (4.29)	116.4 (4.58)	125.2 (4.93)	69.1 (2.72)	49.4 (1.94)	56.9 (2.24)	62.0 (2.44)	79.3 (3.12)	67.9 (2.67)	1,034.5 (40.73)
Average precipitation days (≥ 1.0 mm)	7.1	7.9	8.9	8.2	8.9	9.0	7.6	5.4	6.3	6.9	8.3	7.7	92.2
Average afternoon relative humidity (%)	74	77	73	68	66	64	59	55	59	65	71	72	67
Average dew point °C (°F)	18.1 (64.6)	18.9 (66.0)	17.6 (63.7)	14.7 (58.5)	12.2 (54.0)	9.6 (49.3)	7.8 (46.0)	7.6 (45.7)	9.5 (49.1)	12.5 (54.5)	14.6 (58.3)	16.7 (62.1)	13.3 (56.0)
Source 1: Bureau of Meteorology (temperature, precipitation, humidity 1991–2020 normals)
Source 2: Bureau of Meteorology (temperature extremes 1862–present)

Climate data for Newcastle University – 8.5 kilometres (5 mi) WNW of Newcastle CBD, New South Wales, Australia (1998–2021 normals and extremes); 21 m AMSL
Month	Jan	Feb	Mar	Apr	May	Jun	Jul	Aug	Sep	Oct	Nov	Dec	Year
Record high °C (°F)	44.9 (112.8)	44.0 (111.2)	39.2 (102.6)	34.5 (94.1)	28.8 (83.8)	25.7 (78.3)	25.5 (77.9)	30.5 (86.9)	35.0 (95.0)	37.9 (100.2)	42.2 (108.0)	43.0 (109.4)	44.9 (112.8)
Mean daily maximum °C (°F)	29.5 (85.1)	28.4 (83.1)	26.8 (80.2)	24.1 (75.4)	21.2 (70.2)	18.4 (65.1)	17.9 (64.2)	19.8 (67.6)	22.8 (73.0)	25.0 (77.0)	26.2 (79.2)	27.9 (82.2)	24.0 (75.2)
Mean daily minimum °C (°F)	19.6 (67.3)	19.4 (66.9)	17.5 (63.5)	14.0 (57.2)	10.4 (50.7)	8.8 (47.8)	7.3 (45.1)	7.9 (46.2)	10.8 (51.4)	13.4 (56.1)	15.9 (60.6)	18.0 (64.4)	13.6 (56.4)
Record low °C (°F)	11.2 (52.2)	12.3 (54.1)	9.6 (49.3)	4.0 (39.2)	3.5 (38.3)	2.1 (35.8)	1.0 (33.8)	1.8 (35.2)	4.2 (39.6)	5.4 (41.7)	7.0 (44.6)	8.7 (47.7)	1.0 (33.8)
Average precipitation mm (inches)	81.3 (3.20)	135.5 (5.33)	125.2 (4.93)	118.1 (4.65)	87.5 (3.44)	131.9 (5.19)	64.1 (2.52)	57.1 (2.25)	66.2 (2.61)	68.2 (2.69)	102.3 (4.03)	71.6 (2.82)	1,111.2 (43.75)
Average precipitation days (≥ 1.0 mm)	7.5	9.2	9.0	8.2	7.7	9.3	7.1	6.1	6.0	6.5	8.7	7.3	92.6
Average afternoon relative humidity (%)	57	62	60	61	59	60	54	48	48	50	58	58	56
Average dew point °C (°F)	17.2 (63.0)	18.2 (64.8)	16.3 (61.3)	13.5 (56.3)	10.4 (50.7)	8.5 (47.3)	6.5 (43.7)	6.0 (42.8)	8.3 (46.9)	10.4 (50.7)	14.2 (57.6)	16.1 (61.0)	12.1 (53.8)
Source: Bureau of Meteorology (temperature, precipitation, humidity) (1998–present normals and extremes)

Newcastle Water Temperature
Month	Jan	Feb	Mar	Apr	May	Jun	Jul	Aug	Sep	Oct	Nov	Dec	Year
Average sea temperature °C (°F)	23.6 (74.5)	24.0 (75.2)	23.9 (75.0)	22.9 (73.2)	21.6 (70.9)	20.1 (68.2)	19.2 (66.6)	18.9 (66.0)	19.1 (66.4)	19.4 (66.9)	21.0 (69.8)	22.6 (72.7)	21.3 (70.4)
Source #2: Metoc (sea temperature)

== Demographics ==
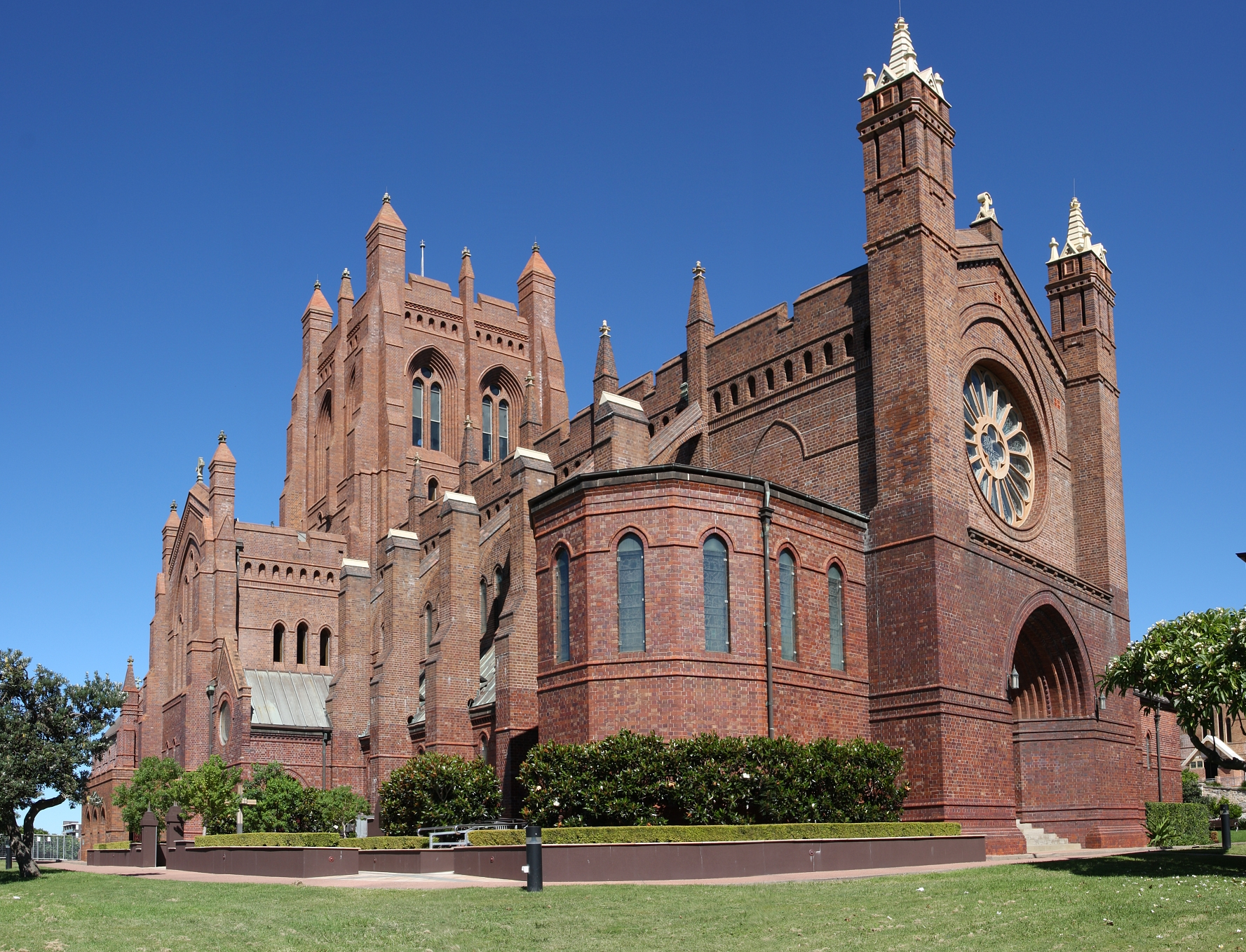
The Christ Church Cathedral is home to the Anglican Diocese of Newcastle.

The metropolitan area of Newcastle is the second-most-populous area in New South Wales to Sydney.

What is generally labelled as the 'Greater Newcastle Area' includes the LGAs of Newcastle, Lake Macquarie, Maitland, Cessnock and Port Stephens. In 2021 this region had a total population of 682,465.

Of people in the Newcastle metropolitan area, 83.6 per cent were born in Australia. The next most common countries of birth were England 2.3%, New Zealand 1.0%, China 0.7%, India 0.5% and Philippines 0.4%. Aboriginal and Torres Strait Islander people made up 3.8% of the population. 88.2% of people spoke only English at home. Other languages spoken at home included Mandarin 0.7%, Macedonian 0.5%, Italian 0.4%, Greek 0.3% and Cantonese 0.3%. The most common responses for religion in Newcastle were No Religion 31.1%, Catholic 21.7% and Anglican 19.2%.

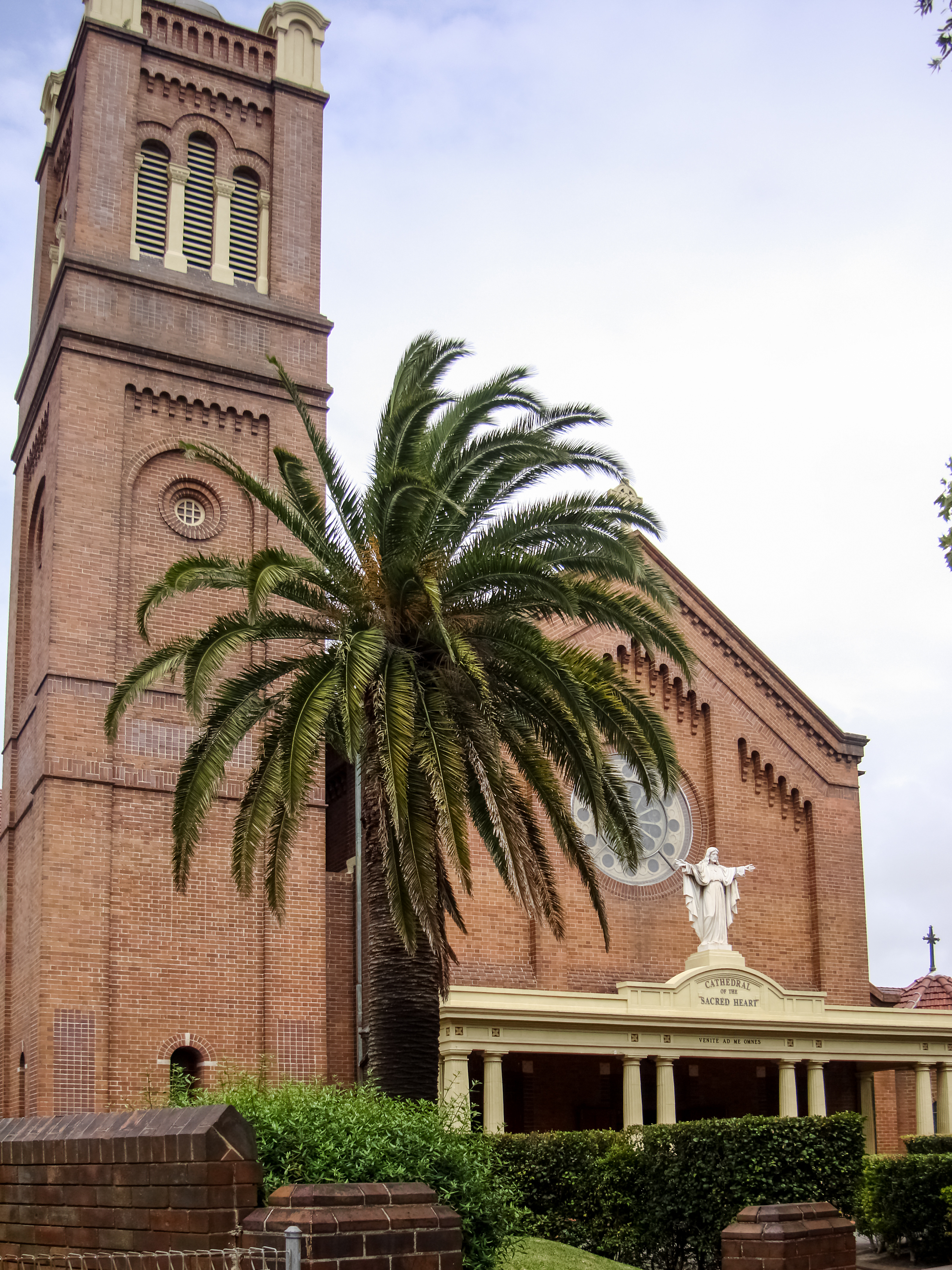
Sacred Heart Catholic Cathedral at Hamilton

Newcastle is often quoted as being the seventh-largest city in Australia. This is misleading as the area represented extends well beyond both the City of Newcastle and the Newcastle metropolitan area. The area, officially the Newcastle Statistical District, is referred to as Greater Newcastle or the Lower Hunter Region, which includes most parts of the Newcastle, Lake Macquarie, Cessnock, Maitland and Port Stephens local government areas and, as of 30 June 2009, has an estimated population of 540,796. Despite their proximity, all of the LGAs in the region maintain their own individual identities, separate from Newcastle.

The population of the suburb of Newcastle is 3,852 as of the 2021 census.

The demonym for the people of Newcastle is "Novocastrian", derived from Latin novus (new) and castra (castle or fort).

== Economy ==
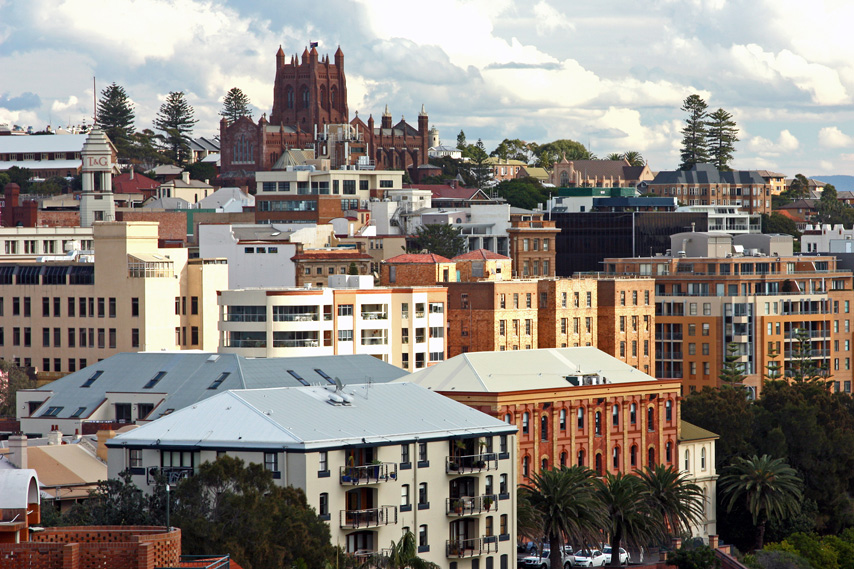
Newcastle city centre from Fort Scratchley

Newcastle as a traditional area of heavy industry was not immune from the effects of economic downturns that plagued New South Wales and wider Australia since the 1970s. These downturns were particularly hard hitting for heavy industry which was particularly prevalent in Newcastle. The early 1990s recession caused significant job losses across Australia and the Newcastle region experienced a peak unemployment rate of 17% in February 1993, compared to 12.1% in New South Wales and 11.9% across Australia.

In 1999, the steelworks closed after 84 years' operation and had employed about 50,000 during its existence, many for decades. The closure of the BHP steelworks occurred at a time of strong economic expansion in Australia. At the time of the closure and since the closure Newcastle experienced a significant amount of economic diversification which has strengthened the local economy.

Since 2003, Australia experienced the effects of the 2000s commodities boom as commodities prices for major export good such as coal and iron ore rose significantly. This provided a large incentive for investment in the Newcastle and Hunter region due to its status as a major coal mining and export hub to Asian markets. Large projects related to the coal industry helped to propel the Newcastle unemployment rate to 20 year lows and allow the Newcastle region to weather the effects of the late 2000s recession better than NSW as a whole. As of 2009, the two largest single employers are the Hunter New England Area Health Service and the University of Newcastle. The National Stock Exchange of Australia (formerly Newcastle Stock Exchange) was formerly based in the city.

=== 19th and early 20th centuries ===
==== Coal ====
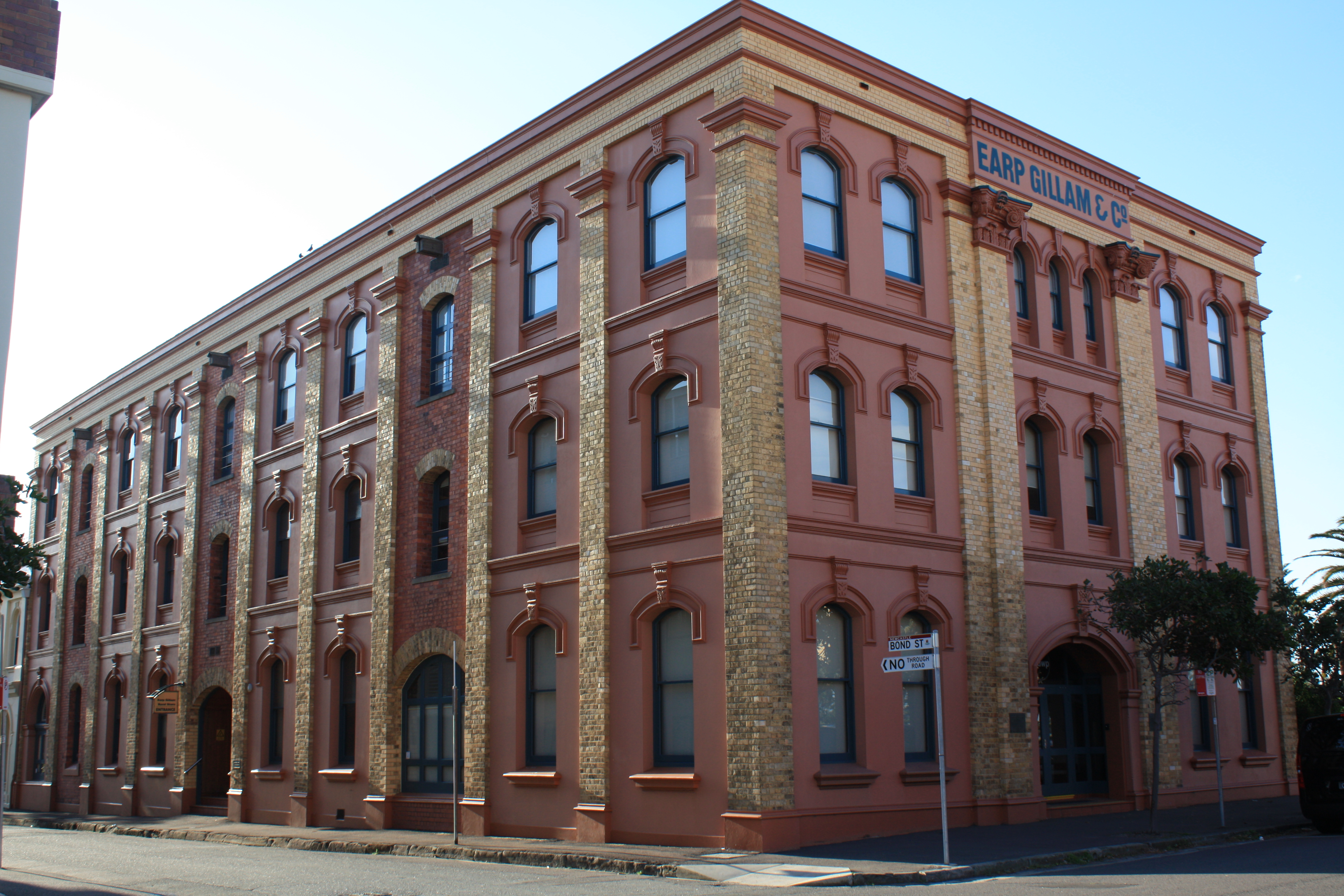
The former Earp Gillam Bond Store – many early merchant companies were founded on Newcastle's 19th-century trade industry.

Coal mining began in earnest on 3 May 1833 when the Australian Agricultural Company received land grants at Newcastle plus a 31-year monopoly on that town's coal traffic. Other collieries were within a 16 km (10 mi) radius of the town. Principal coal mines were located at Stockton, Tighes Hill, Carrington and the Newcastle Coal and Copper Company's collieries at Merewether (includes the Glebe), Wallsend and the Waratah collieries. All operations had closed by the early 1960s.

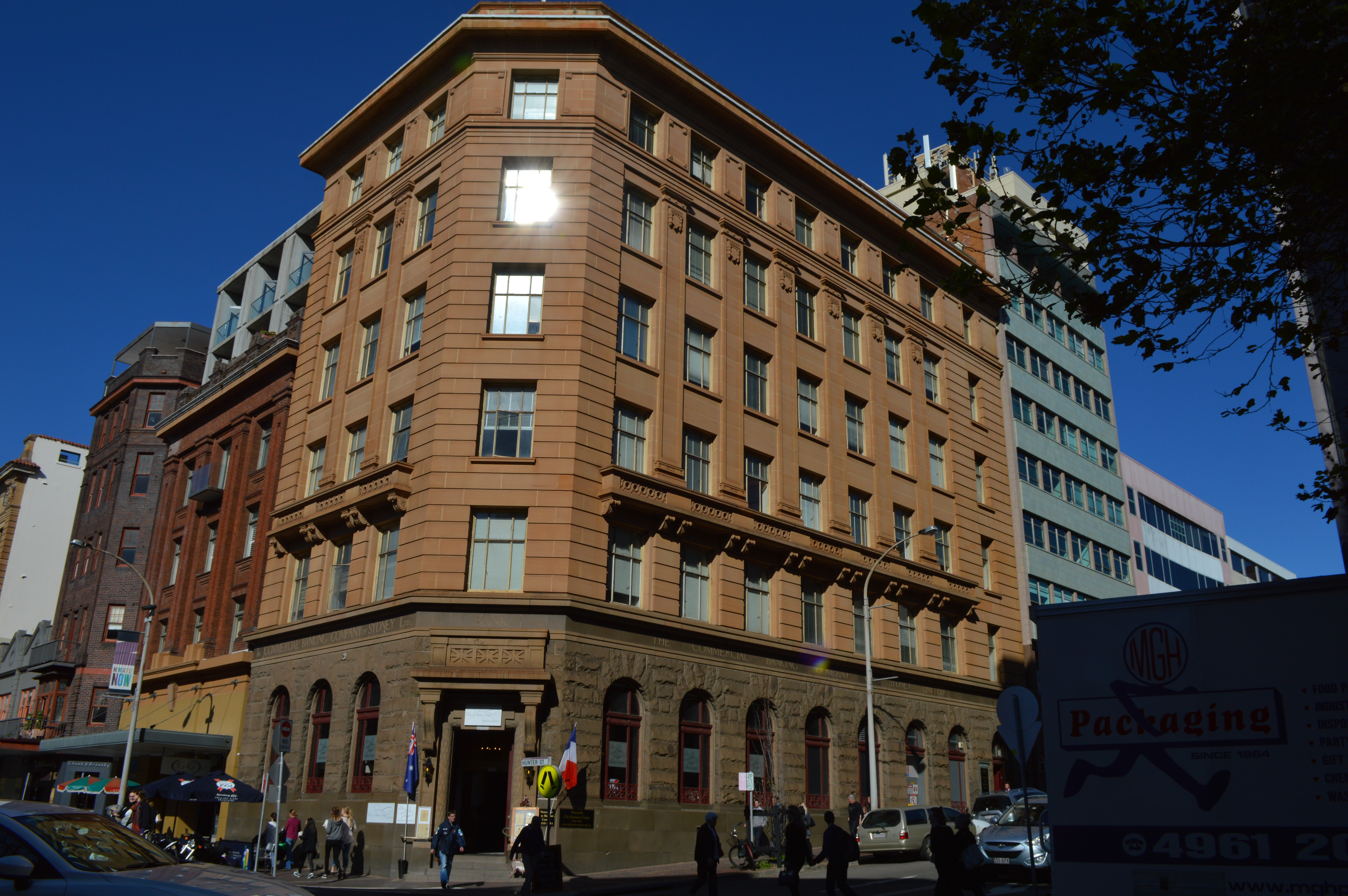
The former Commercial Bank Company building

On 10 December 1831, the Australian Agricultural Company officially opened Australia's first railway, at the intersection of Brown & Church Streets, Newcastle. Privately owned and operated to service the A Pit coal mine, it was a cast-iron fishbelly rail on an inclined plane as a gravitational railway.

==== Copper ====
In the 1850s, a major copper smelting works was established at Burwood, near Merewether. An engraving of this appeared in The Illustrated London News on 11 February 1854. The English and Australian Copper Company built another substantial works at Broadmeadow circa 1890, and in that decade the Cockle Creek Smelter was built.

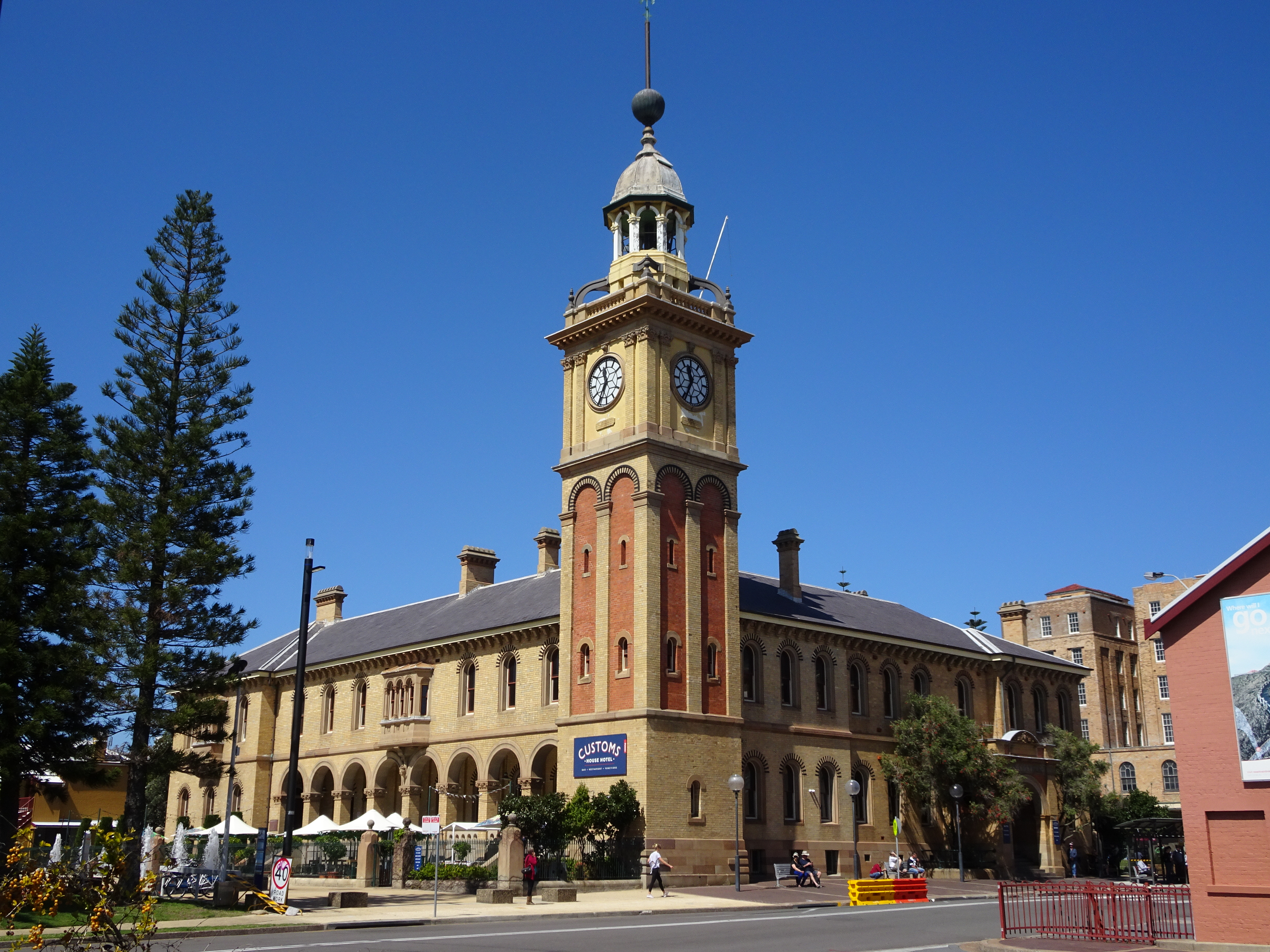
Newcastle Customs House was erected in response to the economic and trade boom of the 19th century

==== Soap ====
The largest factory of its kind in the Southern Hemisphere was constructed in 1885, on an 8.9-hectare (22-acre) site between the suburbs of Tighes Hill and Port Waratah, by Charles Upfold, from London, for his Sydney Soap and Candle Company, to replace a smaller factory in Wickham. Their soap products won 17 medals at International Exhibitions. At the Sydney International Exhibition, they won a bronze medal "against all-comers from every part of the world", the only first prize awarded for soap and candles. Following World War I, the company was sold to Messrs Lever & Kitchen (today Unilever), and the factory closed in the mid-1930s.

==== Steel ====
In 1911, BHP chose the city as the site for its steelworks due to the abundance of coal. The land put aside was prime real estate, on the southern edge of the harbour. In 1915, the Newcastle Steelworks opened, beginning a period of some 80 years dominating the steel works and heavy industry. As Mayfield and the suburbs surrounding the steelworks declined in popularity because of pollution, the steelworks thrived, becoming the region's largest employer.

== Government and politics ==
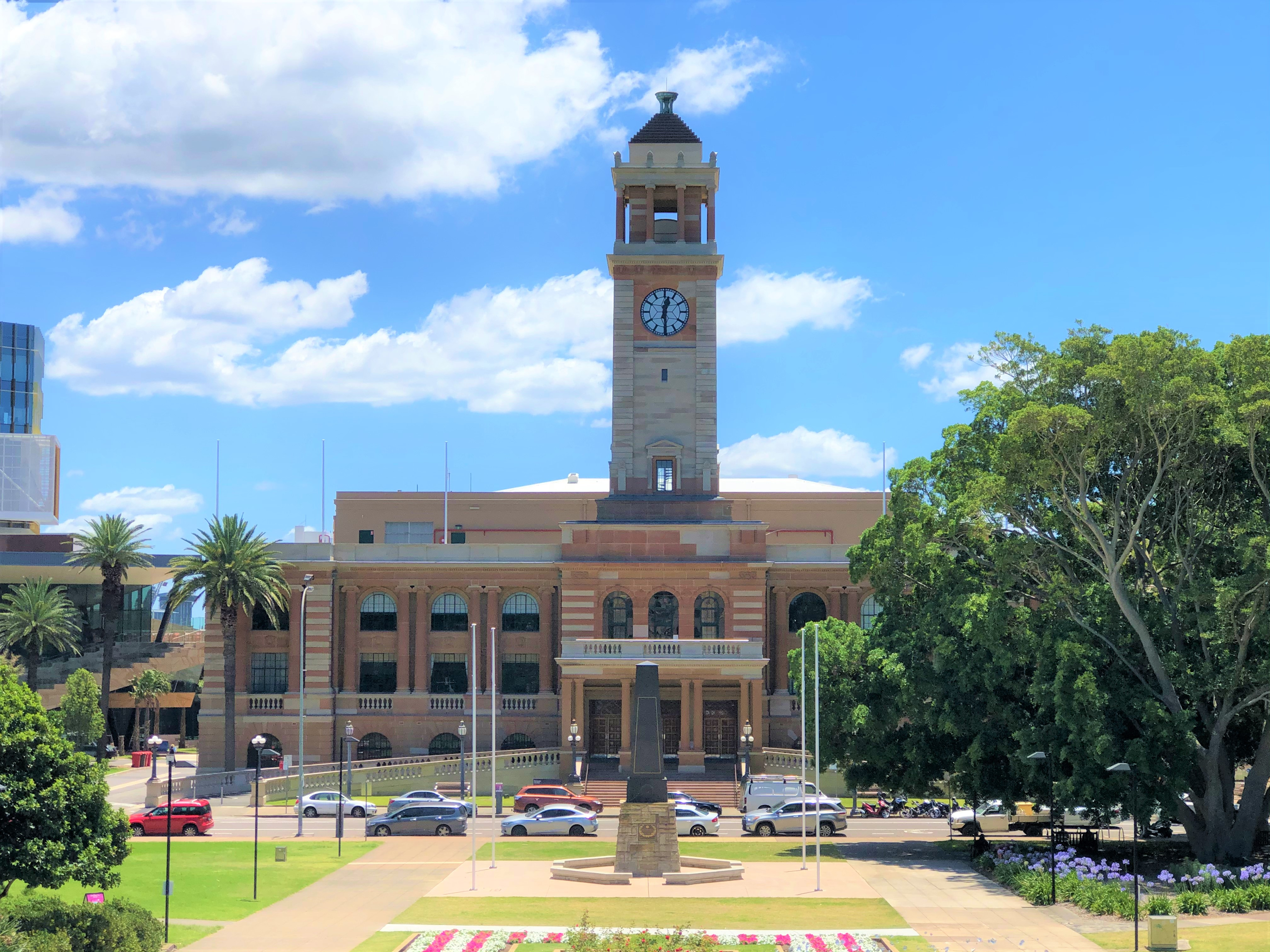
Newcastle City Hall

With its history as a traditionally working-class area, Newcastle has been a stronghold for the centre-left Labor Party at all levels of politics since Federation. Labor currently holds every federal and state seat that overlaps at least partially with Newcastle.

The only area of Greater Newcastle where the centre-right Liberal Party has ever been consistently competitive is the Port Stephens region in the north of the Newcastle metropolitan area, as well as in some beachside, middle-class suburbs near the Newcastle CBD such as Bar Beach and Merewether. The Port Stephens area is traditionally marginal and while historically was dominated by Labor, has been won by the Liberals.

One time the Liberals did win seats in Newcastle was at the 2011 state election. At this election, the incumbent Labor government, led by then-Premier Kristina Keneally, was defeated by the Liberal-National Coalition, led by then-Opposition Leader Barry O'Farrell, in a landslide, suffering the worst ever defeat of a sitting government in New South Wales history and (at the time) the worst defeat of a sitting government anywhere in Australia since World War II. Labor won just 20 seats in the New South Wales Legislative Assembly; of these, only two (Cessnock and Wallsend) were in the Hunter Region. Before the election, the Liberal Party only held one seat in the entire Hunter Region (the seat of Port Stephens, which the party narrowly gained from Labor in 2007). However, at the subsequent state election in 2015, although the Coalition retained majority government (and subsequently retained government again in 2019 before Labor formed a minority government in 2023), the party lost all of its Hunter-based seats.

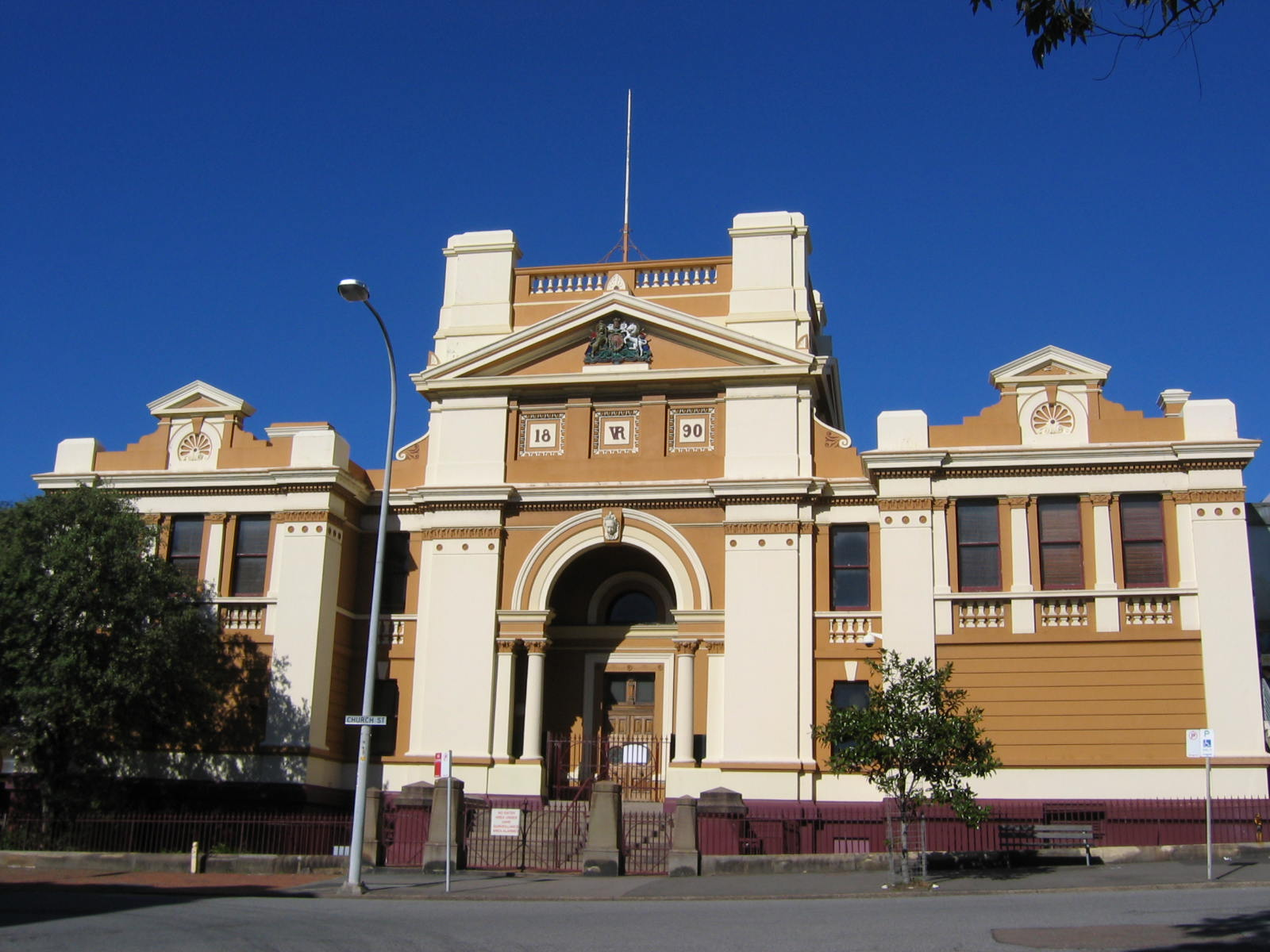
Newcastle Court House

There are three federal electoral divisions that are mostly or entirely within Greater Newcastle: Newcastle (covering the inner-city suburbs; this seat has only ever elected Labor MPs since it was created in 1901), Paterson (covering the Port Stephens area as well as the nearby city of Maitland and the town of Kurri Kurri; this seat is currently a marginal Labor seat that the Liberals have won previously, though it historically included more rural areas and did not include Maitland or Kurri Kurri) and Shortland (a fairly safe Labor seat that includes the eastern suburbs of the Lake Macquarie region in southern Newcastle, and extends to the far northeastern suburbs of the Central Coast). The traditionally Labor-held seat of Hunter (now a marginal Labor seat) is based around the western portion of the Hunter, but includes some western and Southern suburbs of Newcastle.

On the state level, there are five electoral districts that are located entirely within Greater Newcastle; of these, four (Charlestown, Newcastle, Port Stephens and Swansea) are Labor seats while the remaining seat (Lake Macquarie) is held by an independent.

Greater Newcastle also includes five local government areas (LGAs): the City of Newcastle, the City of Lake Macquarie, the City of Cessnock, the City of Maitland and the Port Stephens Council.

== Education ==
=== Primary and secondary schools ===
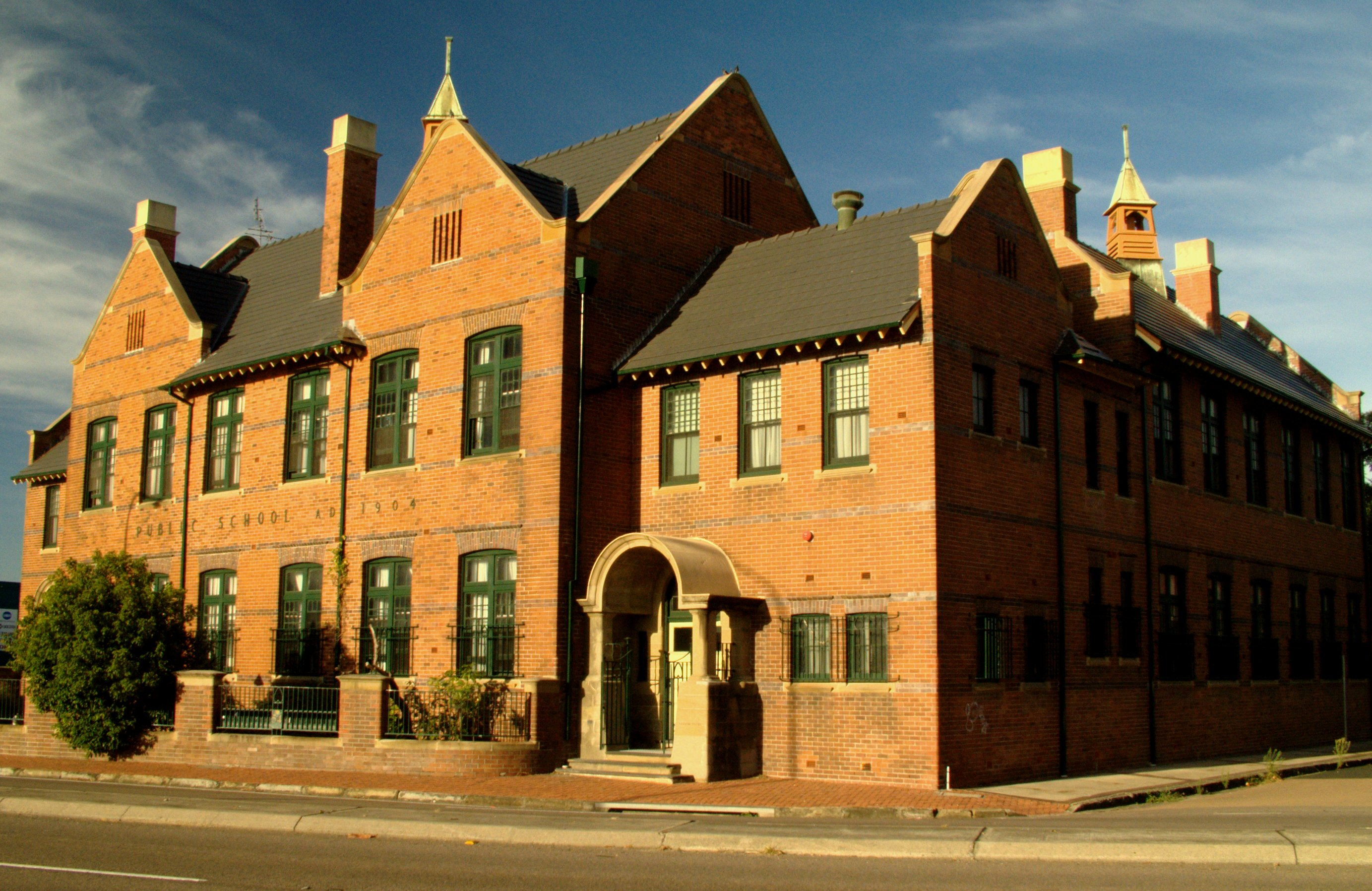
Wickham Public School

Newcastle High School, which was formed by the merger of three schools, traces its lineage to a secondary school section initially founded on the grounds of Newcastle East Public School.

There are three selective state schools in the area:

- Hunter School of the Performing Arts, a fully selective Years 3–12 school, taking students only by audition
- Merewether High School, a fully selective high school in the suburb of Broadmeadow
- Hunter Sports High School, a partially selective sporting high school, accepting around half its students from the local area and around half by audition

The two main independent schools in Newcastle are Newcastle Grammar School and St Philip's Christian College, both coeducational K–12 schools.

The local area is also home to two Steiner schools: the Newcastle Waldorf School at Glendale in Lake Macquarie, and the Linuwel Steiner School in East Maitland.

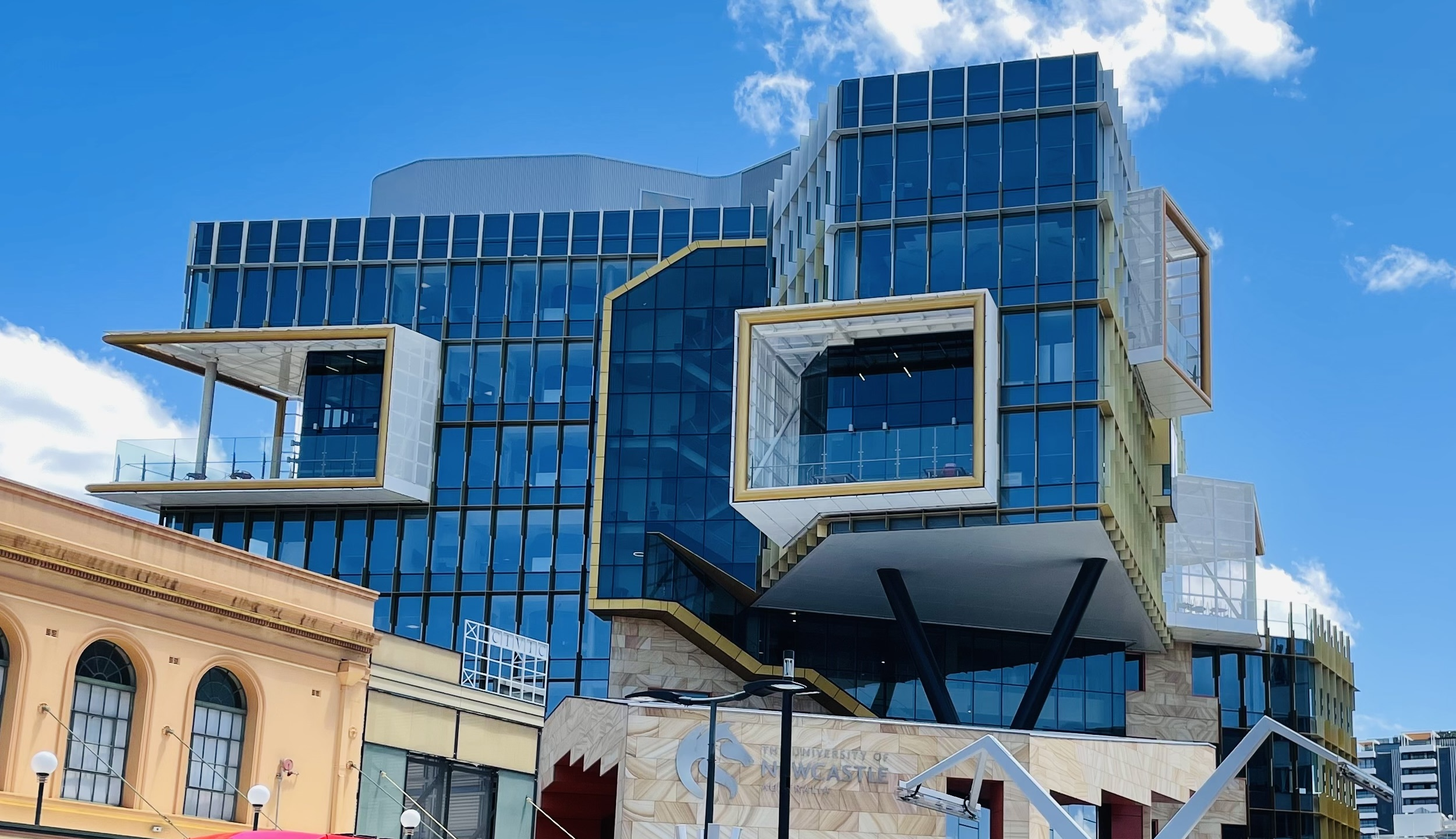
The University of Newcastle's city campus

=== Tertiary and further education ===
The city's main provider of tertiary education is the University of Newcastle. It was established in 1951 as a satellite campus of the University of New South Wales and obtained autonomy in 1965. The university now offers over 150 undergraduate and graduate courses to a student population of more than 38,000, including 7,000 international students from more than 113 countries. The main campus is in the suburb of Callaghan about 12 km (7 mi) from the CBD.

There are three campuses of the Hunter Institute of TAFE, one located in the Newcastle CBD, one in the suburb of Hamilton East and the other located in the suburb of Tighes Hill. The Tighes Hill campus is the network's largest campus and offers courses in business, hospitality and various trades.

== Culture ==
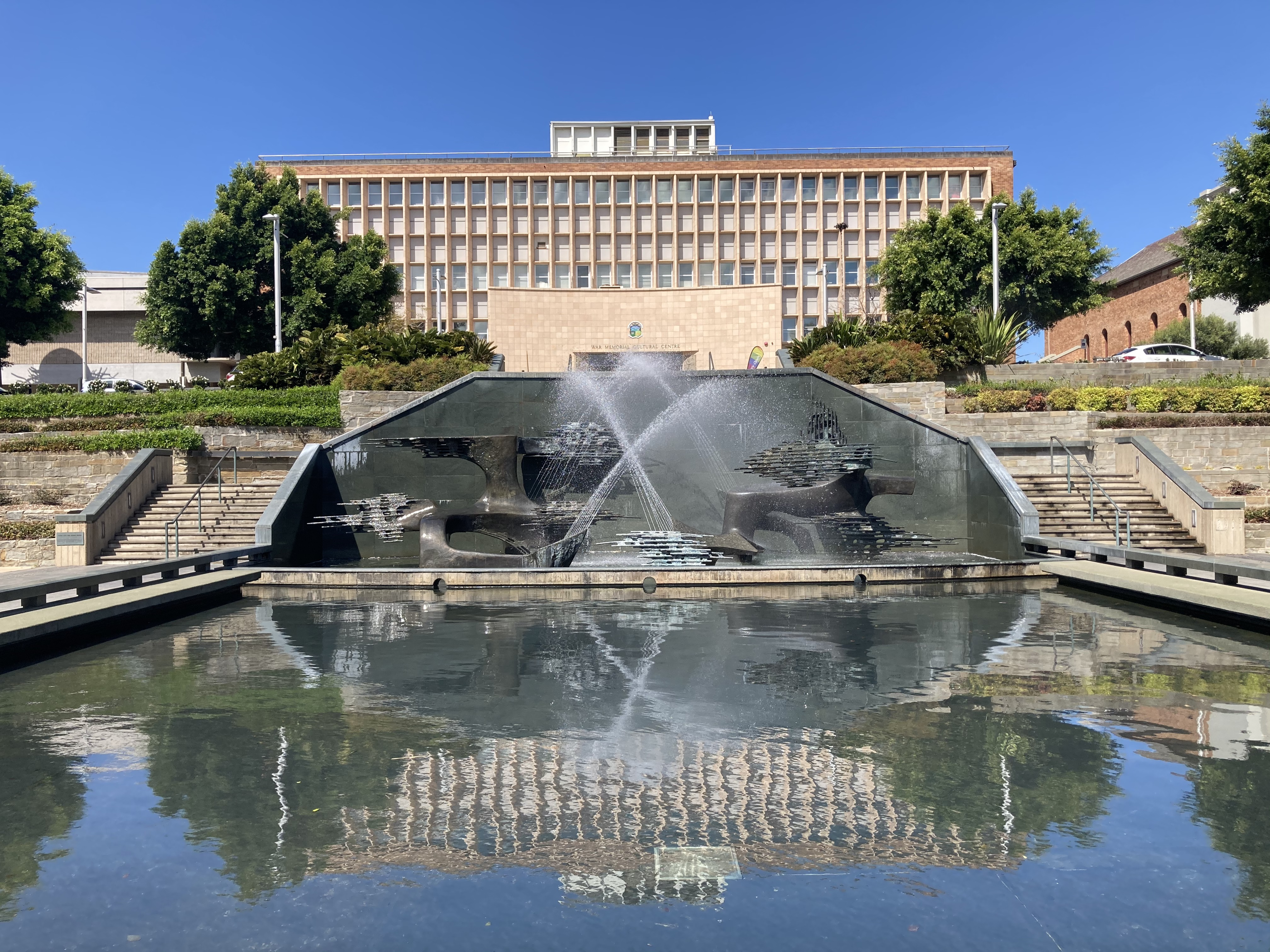
The Captain James James Cook Memorial Fountain fronts the Newcastle Library.

=== Festivals ===
Newcastle holds a variety of cultural events and festivals.

The Newcastle Regional Show is held in the Newcastle Showground annually. There are a mixture of typical regional show elements such as woodchopping displays, showbags, rides and stalls and usually fireworks to complement the events in the main arena.

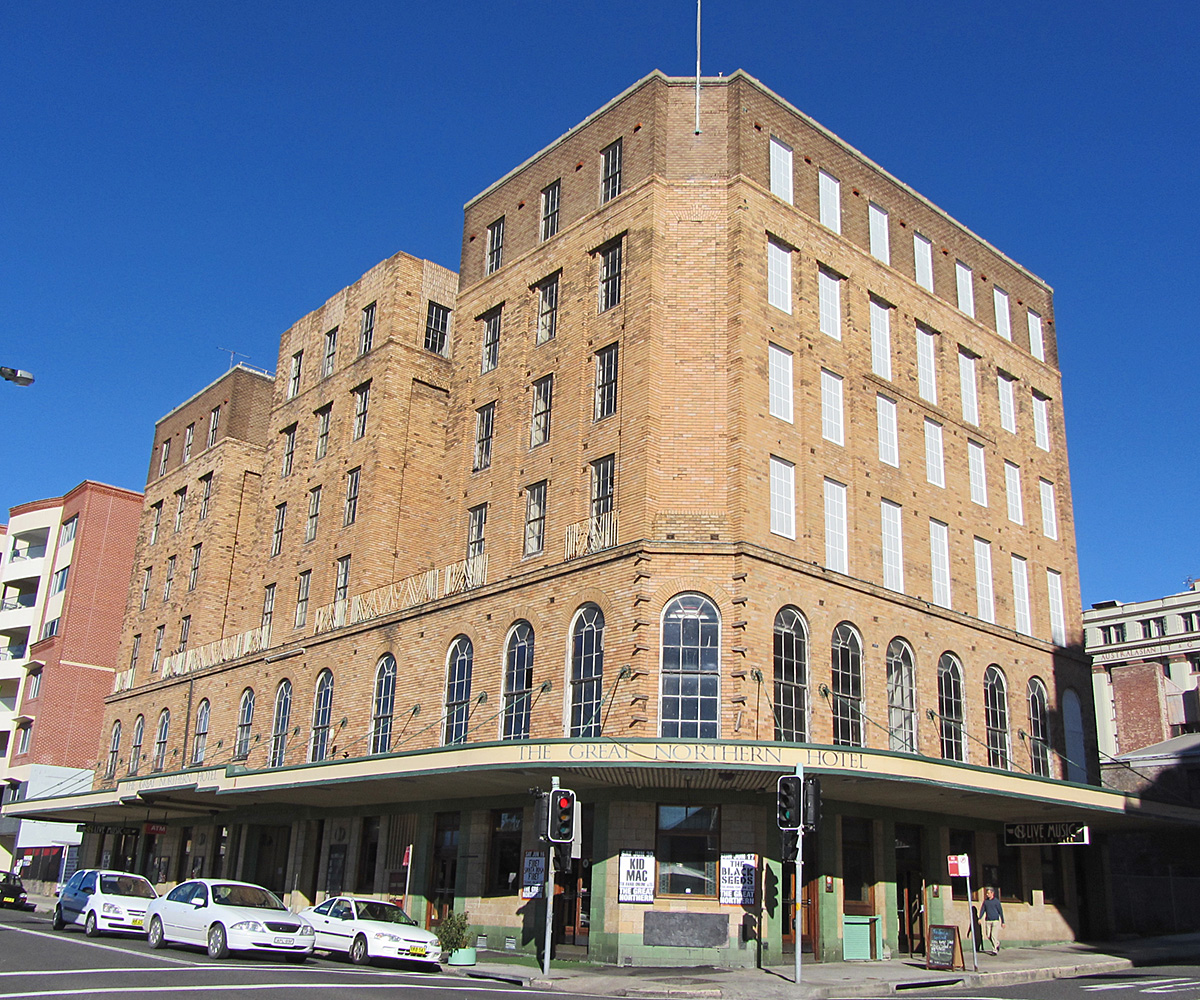
The Great Northern Hotel

The Mattara festival, founded in 1961, is the official festival of Newcastle, with a more traditional "country fair" type program that combines a parade, rides, sporting events, band competitions and portrait and landscape painting exhibitions. Mattara means "hand of friendship" in the local Awabakal language. Originally held at Civic Park and then moved to Newcastle foreshore in 2006 In 2017 the festival was moved to Wallsend Park.

Newcastle Writers' Festival (NWF) is a literary festival established in 2013 by Newcastle Herald journalist Rosemarie Milsom, with over 70 writers participating over 38 sessions in the inaugural event. The following year, Newcastle Library collaborated to add a primary schools program, which has continued with the additional support of Create NSW, Catfish Foundation, and Cessnock City Council. The festival has grown to be one of the largest in Australia, and is a member of the Global Association of Literary Festivals. By its tenth anniversary, the festival had grown to span three days, hosting 90 events and including around 100 writers. As of March 2026, the University of Newcastle is a major partner of the festival, which is held over the last weekend in March. Milsom departed the role of director in May 2026, when she was appointed director of Adelaide Writers' Week.

The Newcastle Jazz Festival is held across three days in August, and attracts performers and audiences from all over Australia. The first festival was held in September 1988 as part the NSW Bicentennial Festival of Music, which was organised by the Newcastle Jazz Action Society. As of 2026 it continues to be held.

This Is Not Art is a national festival of new media and arts held in Newcastle each year over the October long weekend. Since its humble beginnings in 1998, it has become one of the leading arts festivals in Australia dedicated to the work and ideas of communities not included in other major Australian arts festivals. In 2012 the umbrella program included the independent festivals Electrofringe, the National Young Writers' Festival, Critical Animals, Sound Summit, Crack Theatre Festival and other projects that vary from year to year.

The Shoot Out 24-Hour Filmmaking Festival, also known simply as "The Shoot Out", had its inaugural event in Newcastle in 1999. At the annual festival, filmmakers came together in one place to make a short film in 24 hours. It ran annually in July for ten years.

The Newcastle Entertainment Centre, located inside the Newcastle Showground, is a popular venue for regular events, including wrestling, concerts, and monster truck shows.

=== Music ===
Newcastle has an active youth music culture, as well as a Conservatorium of Music which is part of the University of Newcastle. It continues to support local bands and has a large underground music scene. The members of Silverchair, the highly successful Australian band, hail from Newcastle, as do the Australian bands The Screaming Jets and Vacations. It has a fertile punk rock and hardcore scene, which has spawned successful local acts and national acts. Newcastle was also home to the short-lived band Velvet Underground (no relation to the famous American band The Velvet Underground) which featured future AC/DC guitarist Malcolm Young. The region also has its own youth marching band, the Marching Koalas, in which Silverchair drummer Ben Gillies began his drumming career. Danielle Marsh, a member of the world-famous South Korean K-pop girl group NewJeans, as well has her older sister and singer Olivia Marsh, also hails from Newcastle. Influential gabber group Nasenbluten were formed and based in Newcastle, until their disbandment in 2001.

=== Visual arts and galleries ===
Notable modernist artists associated with Newcastle are seascape sketcher Shay Docking (1928–1998), the cubist-influenced abstract painter William Rose (1929–1999), landscape painter John Olsen, who was born in Newcastle in 1928, still-life painter Margaret Olley, portraitist William Dobell and figurative painter John Montefiore lived at Lake Macquarie to the south of the city. Art collector William Bowmore resided in Newcastle and collected Brett Whiteley paintings as well as owning a large collection of international art and artefacts. The Von Bertouch Galleries was a commercial gallery founded by Anne Von Bertouch and for more than forty years from 1963 exhibited nationally and locally known artists.

The Newcastle Art Gallery is home to one of Australia's most substantial public art collections outside a major capital city, and its extensive collection of works by contemporary and historical Australian visual artists presents an overview of Australian art. Due to an ongoing space issue, the gallery is planning a major redevelopment. The Lock Up is a multidisciplinary contemporary art space located in the inner city and hosts local, national and international artists to exhibit in the historic former Newcastle Police station.

=== Theatre ===
Newcastle has a variety of smaller theatres, but the main theatre in the CBD is now the Civic, at Wheeler Place, (seating capacity about 1,500), one of Australia's great historic theatres built during 1929 in Art Deco style. It hosts a wide range of musicals, plays, concerts, dance and other events each year. Newcastle previously boasted several large theatres, among them the oldest purpose-built theatre in Australia, the Victoria Theatre on Perkins Street (built 1876, capacity 1,750), saw touring international opera companies such as the D'Oyly Carte Opera Company, and other troupes, and played host to some of the greatest stars of the age, such as Dame Nellie Melba, Gladys Moncrieff and Richard Tauber (it is now closed and derelict); the Century, Nineways, Broadmeadow (built 1941, capacity 1,800)—although largely used as a cinema—was a popular Symphony orchestra venue (demolished 1990 after being severely damaged by the 1989 earthquake); the Hunter (capacity 1,000) at The Junction, had advanced modern stage facilities, but was eventually sold and demolished to make way for a motel that was destroyed by the 1989 earthquake. The decline in theatres and cinemas from the 1960s onwards was blamed on television.

Newcastle has also been home to noted Australian actors, comedians and entertainers, including Sarah Wynter, John Doyle (part of comic act Roy & HG), Susie Porter, Celia Ireland, Yahoo Serious and Jonathan Biggins. The cast of the Tap Dogs show also come from Newcastle.

=== Media arts ===
Newcastle is home to the Octapod Association, a New Media Arts collective established in 1996. Octapod presents the annual This Is Not Art Festival and is also home to the Podspace Gallery.

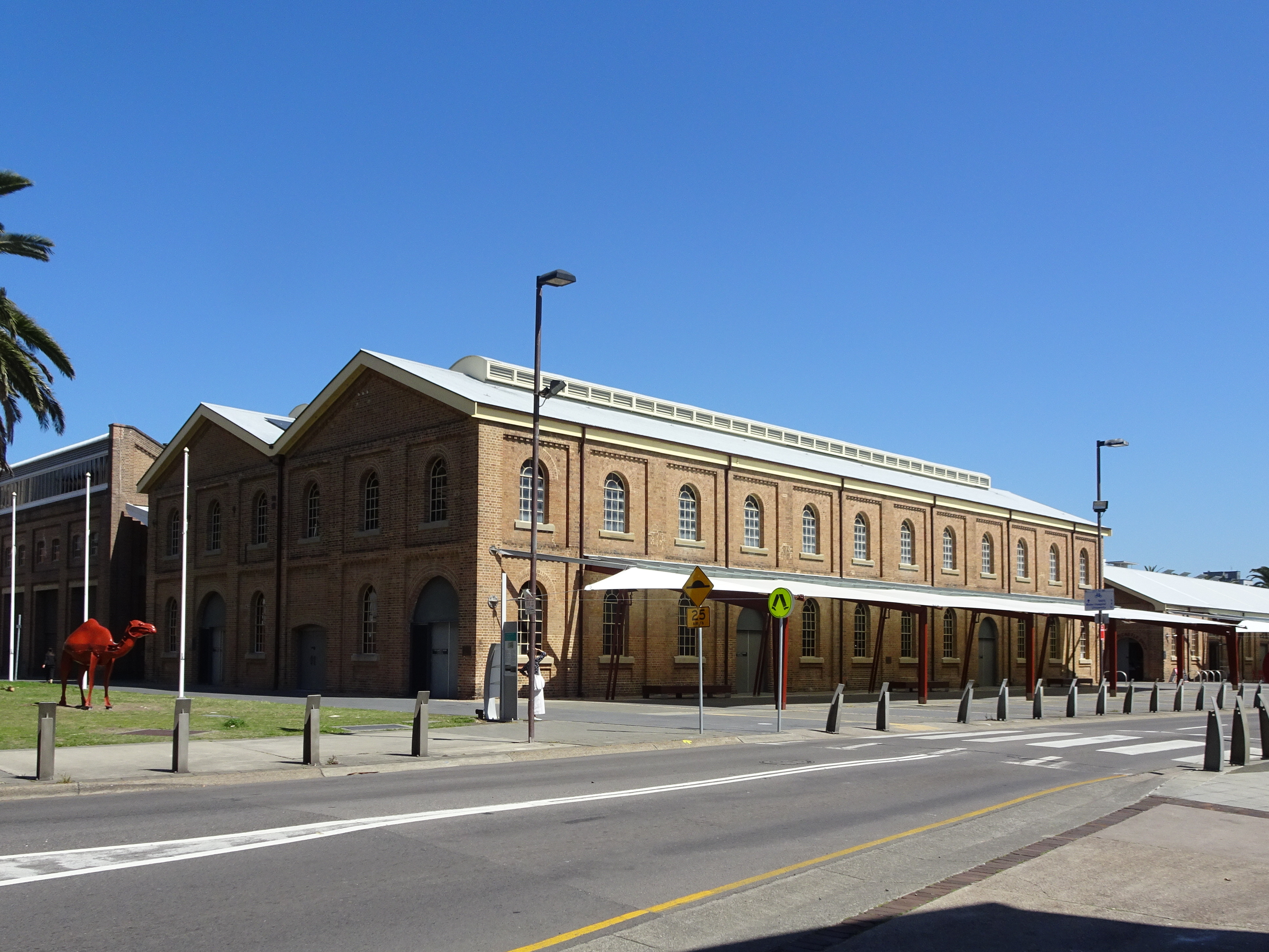
Newcastle Museum

=== Museums ===
The Newcastle Museum was founded in 1988 in the former headquarters of the Great Northern Railway and stewards local history, culture, industry and science. It features permanent exhibitions relating to coal mining and steel production, Aboriginal history and the area's history, as well as a hands-on science centre.

=== Libraries ===
Newcastle has a public library system, Newcastle Libraries. The main branch is in the Newcastle War Memorial and Cultural Centre, and opened in 1957. There are eleven branches: Adamstown, Beresfield, The Digital Library (Newcastle West), Hamilton, Lambton, The Local History Library, Mayfield, New Lambton (with the Newcastle Toy Library), Stockton, and Wallsend. The library has a collaborative collection with the libraries at Dungog and Port Stephens. Though Newcastle Libraries are lending libraries, The stack (City Library basement) has over 100,000 non-lending items which include old Newcastle Morning Heralds, NBN film reels, land title documents, maps, and limited edition books.

The Auchmuty Library at the University of Newcastle is also open to the public, though only students may borrow items.

== Transport ==
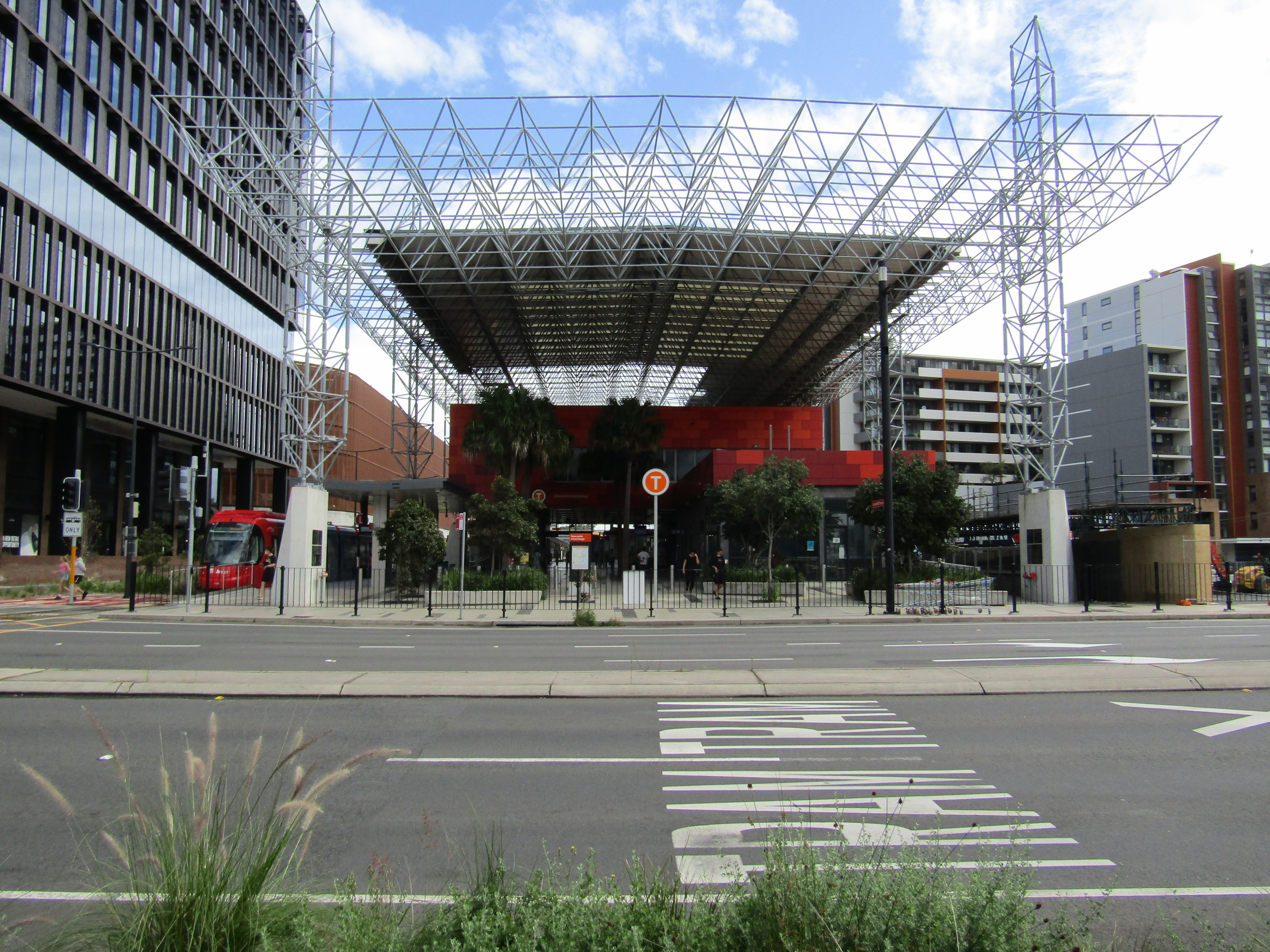
The Newcastle Interchange is a major interchange for commuter rail, light rail and buses.

Like most major cities, the Newcastle metropolitan area has an extensive system of both road links and road based public transport services (bus, taxi etc.) which cover most areas of both Newcastle and Lake Macquarie and which extend beyond the metropolitan area itself. Rail transport, however, is accessible to only a relatively small percentage of the population along the major rail transport routes and ferry services are restricted to those commuting between Newcastle and Stockton. Within the metropolitan area the car remains the dominant form of transportation. Newcastle, like all major Australian urban centres, had a tram system, but it was closed in 1950. In February 2019, trams returned to the city with the opening of the Newcastle Light Rail.

=== Road ===
Newcastle is connected to surrounding cities by the Pacific Motorway (south), Hunter Expressway (west), New England Highway (west) and the Pacific Highway (north and south). Hunter Street is the main shopping street in the Newcastle CBD and, along with King Street, is one of the major links to the Pacific Highway from the CBD. King Street provides direct access to the Newcastle Link Road and then the Pacific Motorway and Hunter Expressway.

=== Bus ===
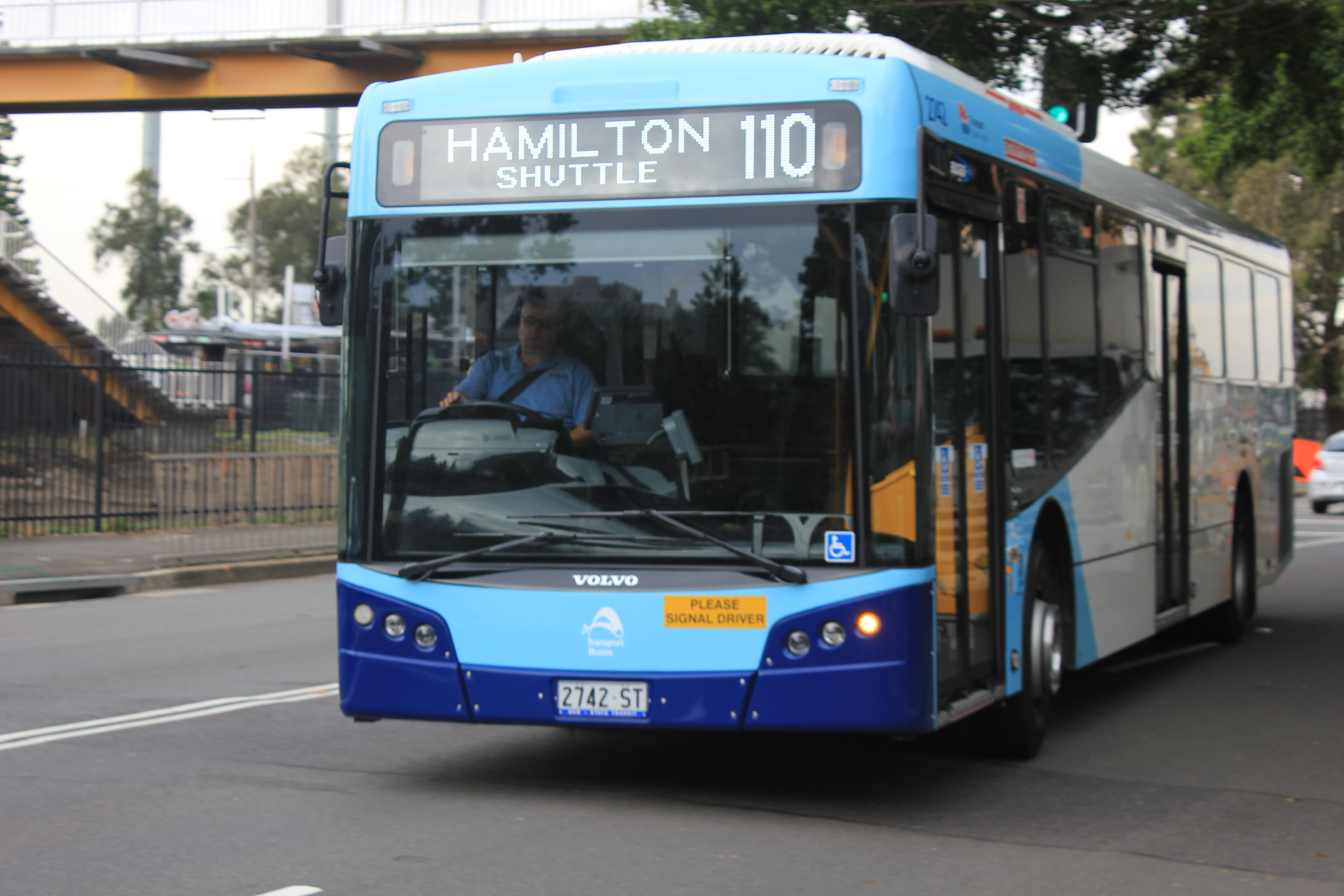
Newcastle Buses & Ferries Bustech bodied Volvo B7RLE operating the Hamilton shuttle route in 2016

Bus services within Newcastle are operated by Newcastle Transport. Prior to July 2017, these were operated by Newcastle Buses & Ferries. Hunter Valley Buses, Port Stephens Coaches and Rover Coaches also operate services into the CBD from other parts of the Hunter Region.

The network radiates from a bus terminal at Newcastle Interchange. Major interchanges are located at the University of Newcastle, Wallsend, Glendale, Warners Bay, Belmont, Charlestown Square and Westfield Kotara.

Greyhound Australia, Premier Motor Service and Sid Fogg's long-distance services serve Newcastle.

=== Rail ===
The Newcastle area is serviced by two Sydney Trains intercity lines providing local and regional commuter services terminating at Newcastle Interchange along the Newcastle line. The Central Coast & Newcastle Line has twice-hourly train services to Sydney and the Central Coast. The Hunter Line has twice-hourly services to Maitland and less frequently to Scone and Dungog. Two long-distance lines operate through the Newcastle area using Broadmeadow station. These provide services to Moree, Armidale, Brisbane and Sydney.

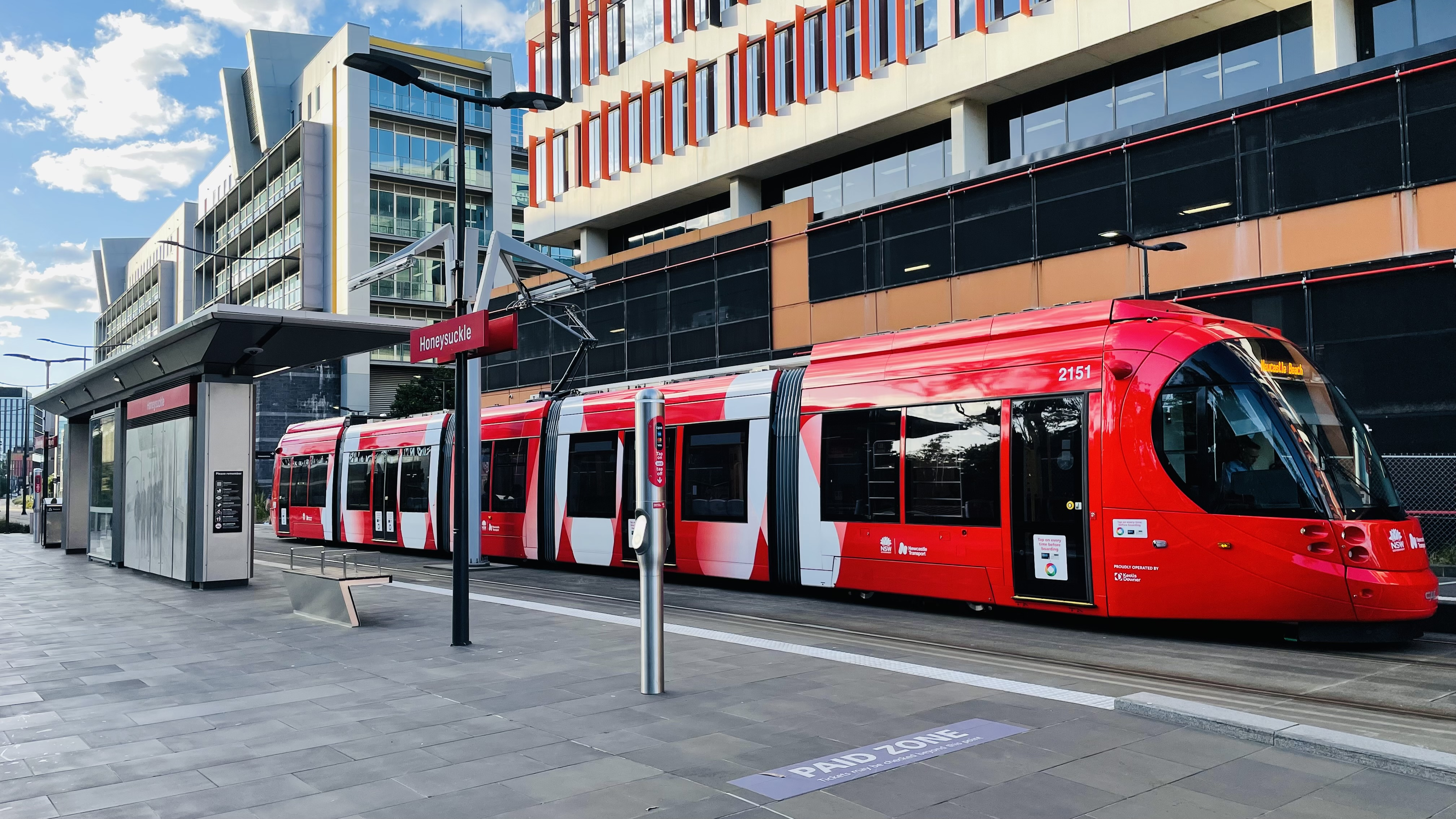
The Newcastle Light Rail line at Honeysuckle

Newcastle once had rail passenger services to Belmont and Toronto, on Lake Macquarie, Wallsend, Kurri Kurri and several towns and villages between Maitland and Cessnock on the South Maitland Railway, but these lines have been closed. In the late-1990s there was intense debate about the future of the rail line into central Newcastle.

In December 2014, the Newcastle line was curtailed to Hamilton. A new Newcastle Interchange opened on 15 October 2017. The Newcastle Light Rail line also operates from here.

From 1924 until 1994, Broadmeadow Locomotive Depot was the main railway centre for the Hunter region. Cardiff Locomotive Workshops opened in 1928, primarily as a major repair centre for New South Wales Government Railways locomotives, although it did build twelve 38 class and two 58 class locomotives. Today it is operated by Downer Rail and along with UGL Rail's Broadmeadow plant, remains active as a locomotive and rolling stock manufacturer and repairer.

=== Water ===
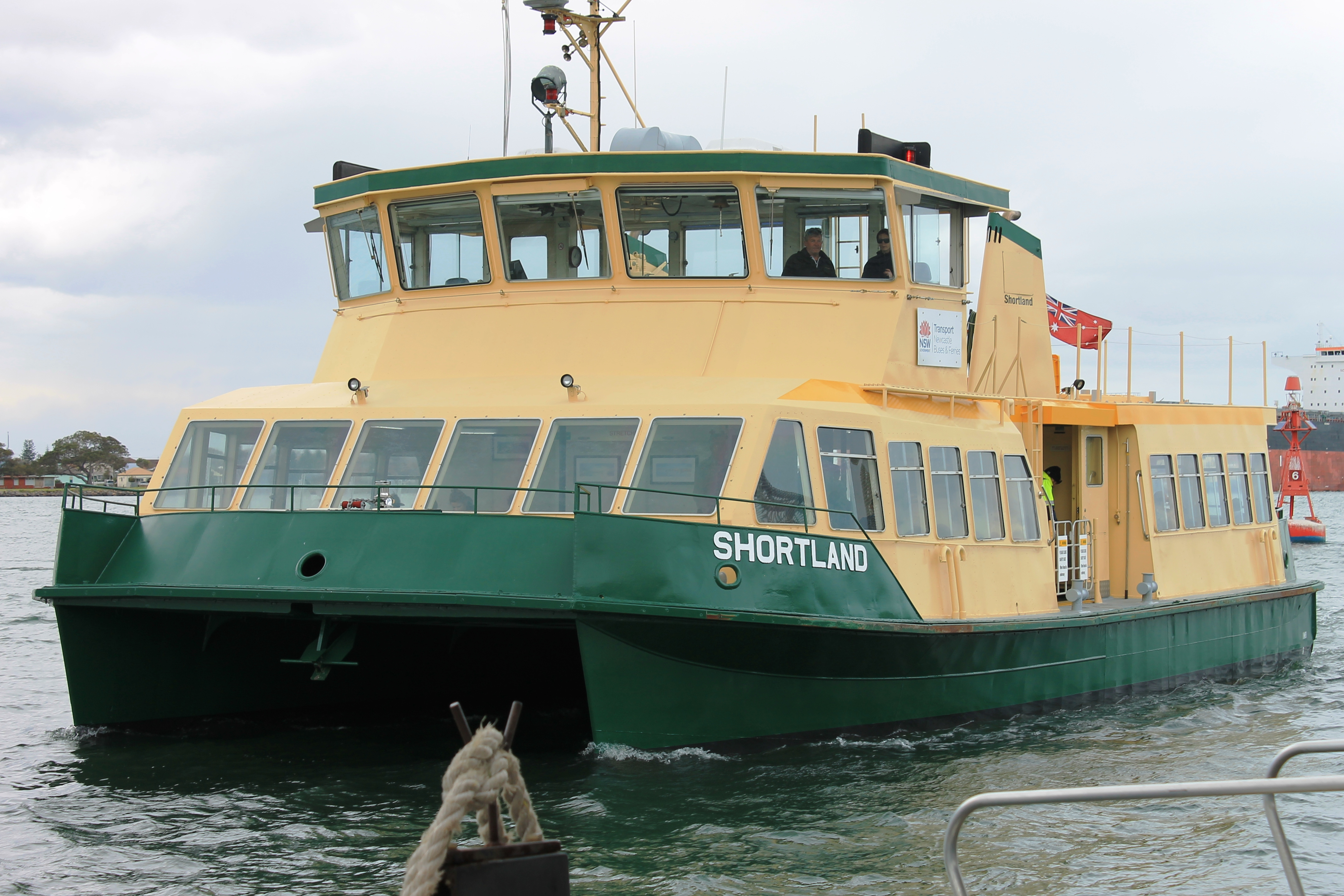
The Stockton Ferry

The Port of Newcastle is crucial to the economic life of Newcastle and the Hunter Valley region beyond. Over 90 million tonnes of coal is shipped through the facility each year—making it the largest coal exporting port in the world. The Port of Newcastle claims to be Australia's first port. Coal was first exported from the harbour in 1799.

Newcastle Transport operates a ferry service across the Hunter River between Newcastle's CBD and Stockton.

=== Airport ===
Newcastle Airport is located 15 km (9 mi) north of the Newcastle CBD (27 km [17 mi] by road). The airport, which is a joint venture between Newcastle City Council and Port Stephens Council, has experienced rapid growth since 2000 as a result of an increase in low-cost airline operations. The airport is located at RAAF Base Williamtown, a Royal Australian Air Force base on land leased from the Department of Defence.

Newcastle Heliport operates alongside the lower section of Newcastle Harbour.

The suburb of Broadmeadow is home to the base of the Westpac Life Saver Rescue Helicopter Service. The Helicopter service is one of the longest running services of this type in the world. Two helicopters operate out of this base and operate 24 hours a day.

The closure of Belmont Airport, commonly referred to as Aeropelican, in the Lake Macquarie suburb of Marks Point has caused Williamtown to become Newcastle's only major airport and residents in the south of the Newcastle metropolitan area must commute up to 55 km (34 mi) by car to reach Williamtown.

== Sport ==
=== Rugby league ===
Rugby league is a popular sport in Newcastle, with the Newcastle Knights representing the city in the National Rugby League. The Knights play at the 33,000-capacity McDonald Jones Stadium, situated in the suburb of New Lambton.

The Newcastle Rugby League holds local club competition and has done so since the early 1900s. Touring domestic and international teams would play against Newcastle's representative team which was made up of players from this league. The Newcastle & Hunter Rugby League is a community competition also based in the region which was created from a merger in 2007 of leagues which ran under various names since the mid-20th century, and is the largest community rugby league competition anywhere in the world. It generally features smaller teams compared to the Newcastle Rugby League.

McDonald Jones Stadium hosted the 2016 Anzac Test between Australia and New Zealand.

=== Football (Soccer) ===
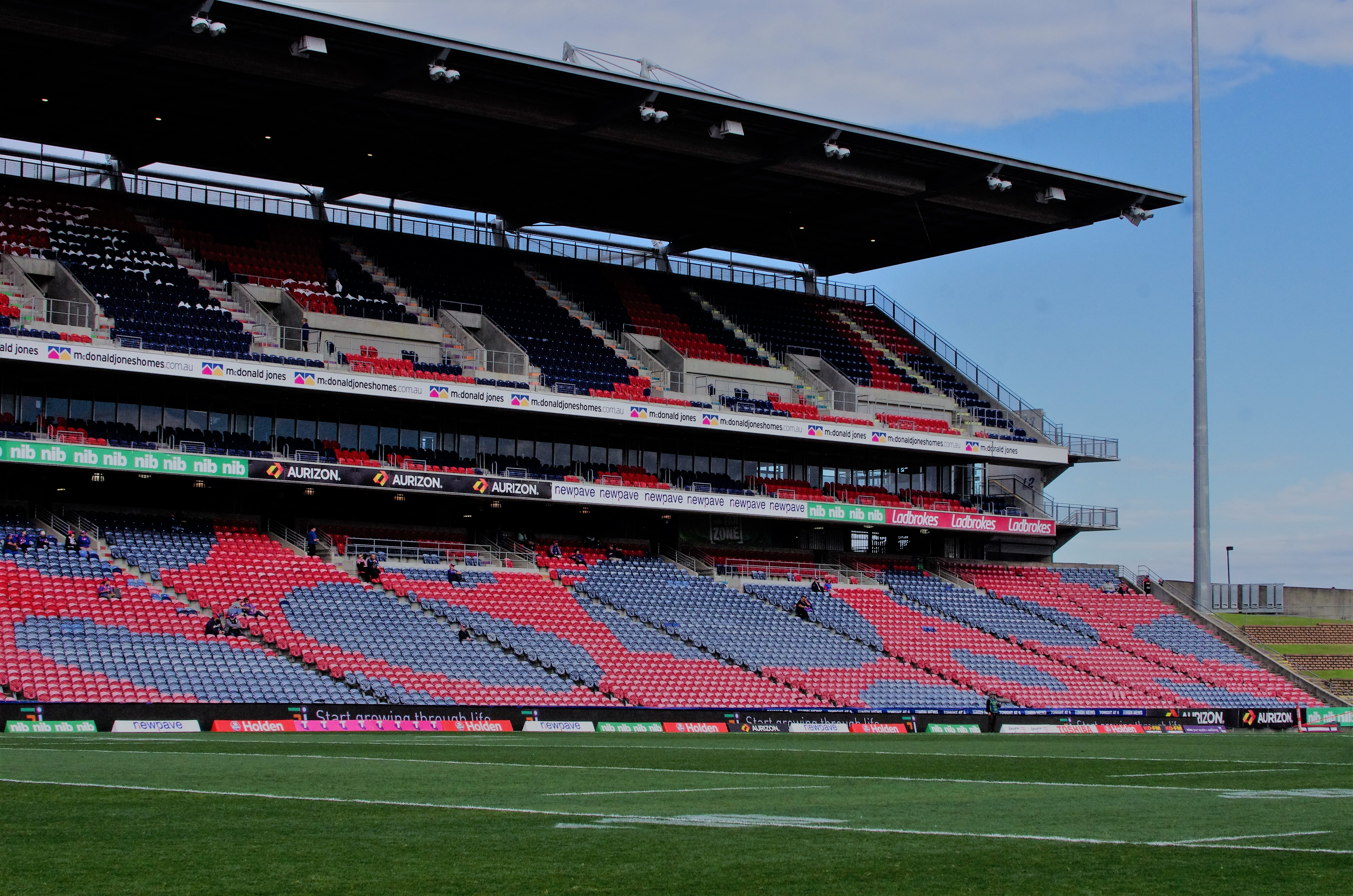
McDonald Jones Stadium is home to the Newcastle Jets FC, and hosts major sporting events such as the A-League

Football (Soccer), has the largest participation and registered player base in the region. This is due to the large numbers of youth teams and women participants.

The Newcastle Jets Football Club, which plays in Australia's highest-level soccer competition, the A-League, also play at McDonald Jones Stadium. The Newcastle Jets won the A-League competition in their third season, defeating local rivals the Central Coast Mariners in the grand final. The team also won the Premiers Plate in the 2025/2026 season

The city also played host to four games of the 2015 AFC Asian Cup, including the semi-final between Australia and the United Arab Emirates, as well as the third-place playoff between the United Arab Emirates and Iraq.

=== Horse racing ===
Broadmeadow Racecourse is in the suburb of Broadmeadow. It is home to the Newcastle Jockey Club, established in 1907, which (as of 2016) races 35 times annually at the spacious 2,000-metre (6,562 ft) turf track with a 415-metre (1,362 ft) home straight. The Club hosts several black-type races including four Group 3 races including the 1,400-metre (0.87 mi) Newcastle Stakes, registered as theNewcastle Newmarket Handicap in March; the 1,500-metre Big Dance eligible Cameron Handicap, the 1,400-metre Tibbie Stakes and the 2,300-metre (1.4 mi) Newcastle Gold Cup in September and the 1,600-metre Spring Stakes in November. In 2015, racing commenced on an inner track, known as the Beaumont Track.

The racecourse also hosts the $1 million The Hunter, a 1,300-metre quality handicap introduced in 2019 and is currently Listed status. Held each November, it headlines Newcastle's standalone metropolitan Saturday meeting, which also features the Group 3 Spring Stakes and the Listed Beauford over 2,300-metres.

Aboriginal jockey Merv Maynard commenced his career at Newcastle Racecourse, under Keith Tinson. Maynard enjoyed his first success in the 1948–49 season there, and went on to have a career spanning 50 years, winning the Newcastle Premiership twice, along with 1,500 winning rides in four countries.

=== Cricket ===
A bid for Newcastle to establish a 2012 team in the national Twenty20 competition the Big Bash League, with games played at either Hunter Stadium or No.1 Sports Ground was unsuccessful.

In an effort to host elite national competitions, an $8 million refurbishment of a sportsground was completed in 2022, with a further $20 million project proposed in 2025.

=== Rugby union ===
Rugby union is a football code that has been played in Newcastle since at least 1869, with the Newcastle Football Club formed in 1877. Newcastle and Hunter Rugby Union is the main body overseeing the sport in the region. In 2019, the New South Wales Waratahs of the professional Super Rugby competition played a regular season match in Newcastle at Hunter Stadium for the first time.

=== Basketball ===
Newcastle has had two teams in the National Basketball League, the Newcastle Falcons and Hunter Pirates. Both teams folded due to financial difficulties. The Newcastle Falcons NBL1 program competes in the second-tier NBL1 East and plays at Newcastle Basketball Stadium.

The city co-hosted the 1985 FIBA Oceania Championship where Australia's national basketball team won its seventh straight title.

=== Ice hockey and skating ===
The Newcastle North Stars are Newcastle's representatives in the Australian Ice Hockey League championships. Originally based in Newcastle West in the 1970 and '80s, the North Stars now play out of the Hunter Ice Skating Stadium in Warners Bay.

=== Motorsport ===
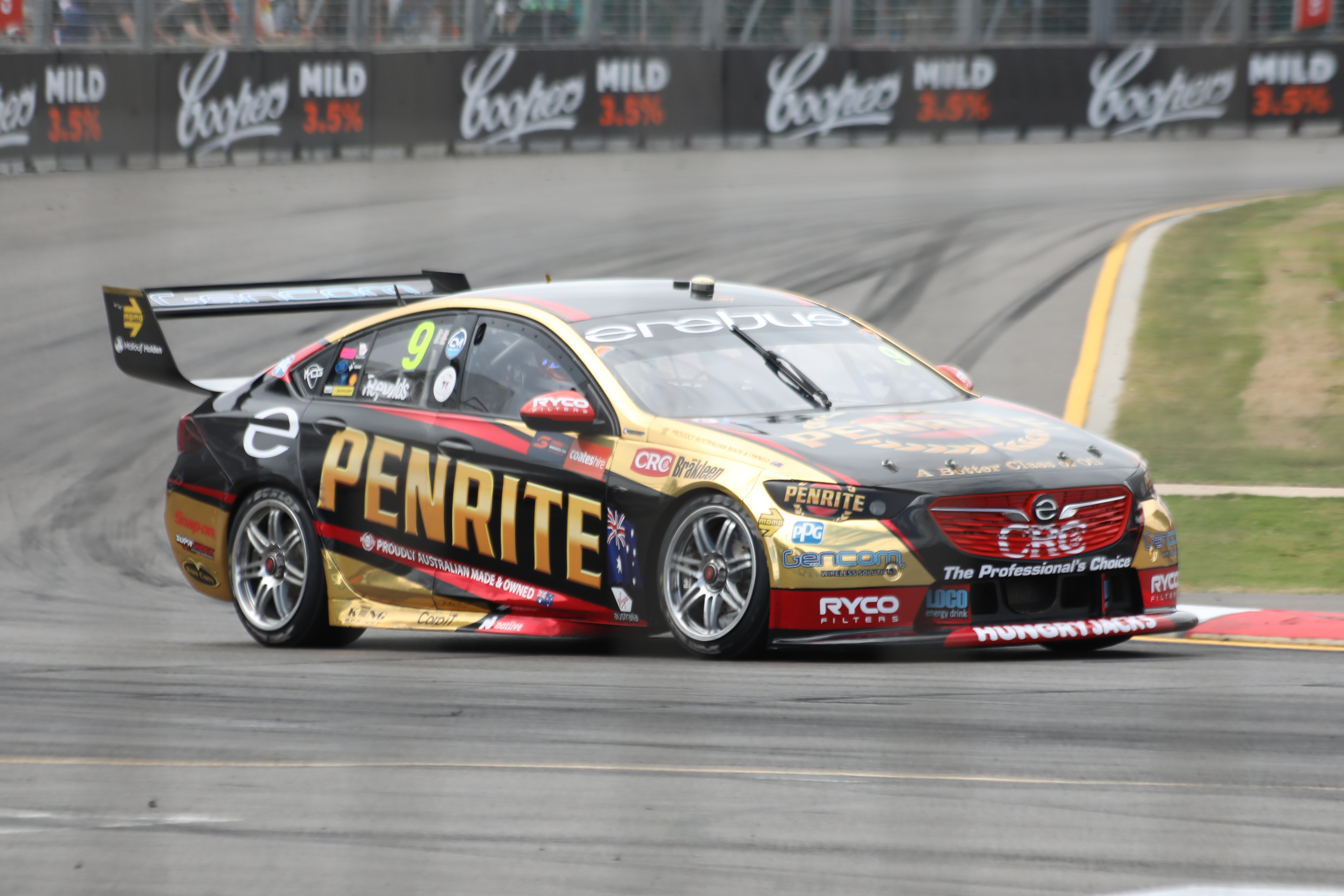
Newcastle hosts the Newcastle 500 Supercars race.

Newcastle hosted the final round of the Supercars Championship in 2017. The Newcastle 500 is held on the Newcastle Street Circuit in the East End of the city. The city previously hosted the Mattara Hillclimb which was held in King Edward Park, and has hosted the F1 Offshore Powerboats in the harbour.

=== Netball ===
The Hunter Jaegers (Commonwealth Bank Trophy – Netball) were based at the Newcastle Entertainment Centre. They became defunct in 2007 after merging with the Sydney Swifts to become the New South Wales Swifts. Officially opened in June 1992, the Entertainment Centre offers 5,000 square metres of clear-span floor space and is capable of catering for capacities from 2,000 to 6,500 for entertainment-style events. The Centre was built to house the now-defunct Newcastle Falcons National Basketball League team and was also home to the Hunter Pirates before a lack of sponsorship forced them to close after the 2005–06 season, with the licence sold to the Singapore Slingers. The Slingers played one home game at the Centre during the 2006–07 season.

=== Water sports ===
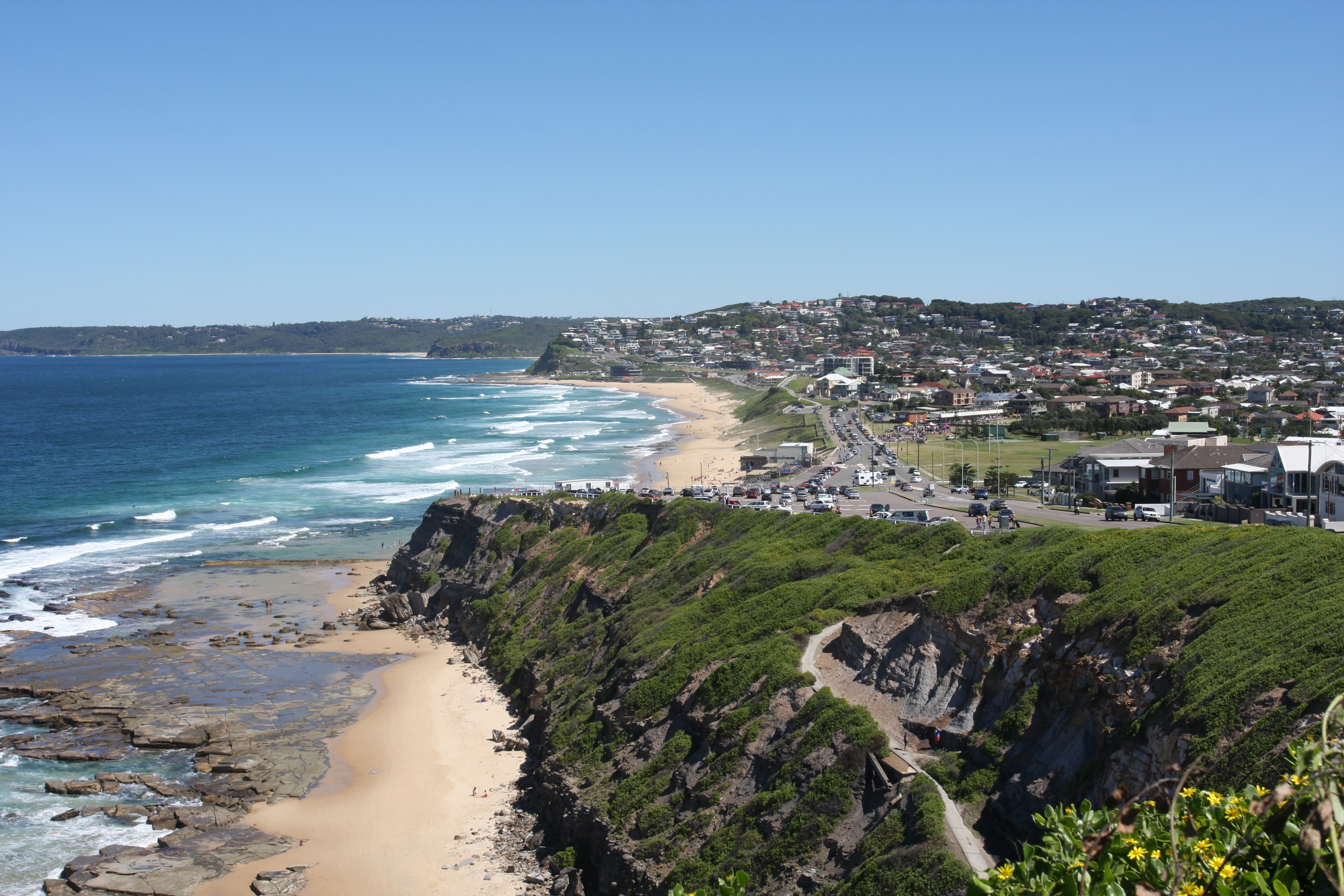
Bar Beach, south of the Newcastle CBD, is a popular swimming and surfing beach.

Newcastle has an abundance of beaches and surf breaks for which the city is internationally well known. Newcastle hosts the annual surfing contest Surfest on the world professional surfing tour. Four-time world champion surfer Mark Richards grew up surfing at Newcastle's Merewether Beach, and is a local icon, appearing at many local functions, and supporting local charities. Nobbys Beach is a very popular kitesurfing spot, especially during the warm summer months when there are north-easterly sea breezes.

== Media ==
Newcastle is served by a daily tabloid, The Herald (formerly The Newcastle Morning Herald and Miners' Advocate and then The Newcastle Herald), several weeklies including the Newcastle Star, The Post and the bi-monthly The Hunter Advocate.

Other alternative media in the city include the university's student publications Opus and Yak magazine, Newcastle Mirage (a local arts and culture zine) and Urchin (a zine published by the media and arts organisation Octapod).

The city is also served by several local radio stations, including those owned by the Australian Broadcasting Corporation and SBS.

- AM stations
  - 2HD (commercial) 1143 AM – Australia's second oldest existing radio station.
  - Radio 1629 Newcastle (off band commercial) 1629 AM
- FM stations
  - Triple M Newcastle (commercial) 102.9 FM
  - hit106.9 Newcastle (commercial) 106.9 FM
  - New FM (commercial) 105.3 FM
  - 2NUR (community) 103.7 FM
  - Rhema FM Newcastle (Christian) 99.7 FM
- Government broadcasters
  - Australian Broadcasting Corporation
    - ABC Newcastle local radio 1233 AM
    - ABC Radio National 1512 AM
    - ABC NewsRadio (News and Parliament) 1458 AM
    - Triple J (youth station) 102.1 FM
    - ABC Classic FM (classical music) 106.1 FM
  - Special Broadcasting Service
    - SBS Radio (foreign-language service) 1413 AM
- Narrowcast stations
  - Sky Sports Radio (as part of statewide network) 1341 AM
  - Newy 87.8 FM
  - Raw FM 88.0 FM

Newcastle is also served by five television networks, three commercial and two national services:

- Nine Northern NSW – Nine Network affiliated, owned by WIN Corporation. Pre-aggregation, NBN Television was the incumbent commercial station in the Newcastle region.
- 10 Northern NSW – Network 10 owned and operated
- Seven Northern NSW – Seven Network owned and operated
- ABC Television
- SBS Television

WIN Television airs NBN News live from their Honeysuckle studios each night at 5:30pm. The bulletin is locally produced stories sourced from the Nine Network. Local news updates are aired by Seven, Nine (as NBN News) and 10 throughout the day to fulfil local content quotas.

== Disasters ==
=== 1989 earthquake ===
On 28 December 1989, Newcastle experienced an earthquake measuring 5.6 on the Richter scale, which killed 13 people, injured 162 and destroyed or severely damaged a number of prominent buildings. Some had to be demolished, including the large George Hotel in Scott Street (city), the Century Theatre at Broadmeadow, the Hunter Theatre (formerly 'The Star') and the majority of The Junction school at Merewether. Part of the Newcastle Workers' Club, a popular venue, was destroyed and later replaced by a new structure. The following economic recession of the early 1990s meant that the city took several years to recover. However, Beaumont Street, Hamilton, where many buildings sustained major damage, became a thriving cosmopolitan restaurant strip after the earthquake and is still going strong today. The earthquake helped to rekindle business in this suburban strip.

=== June 2007 Hunter Region and Central Coast storms ===
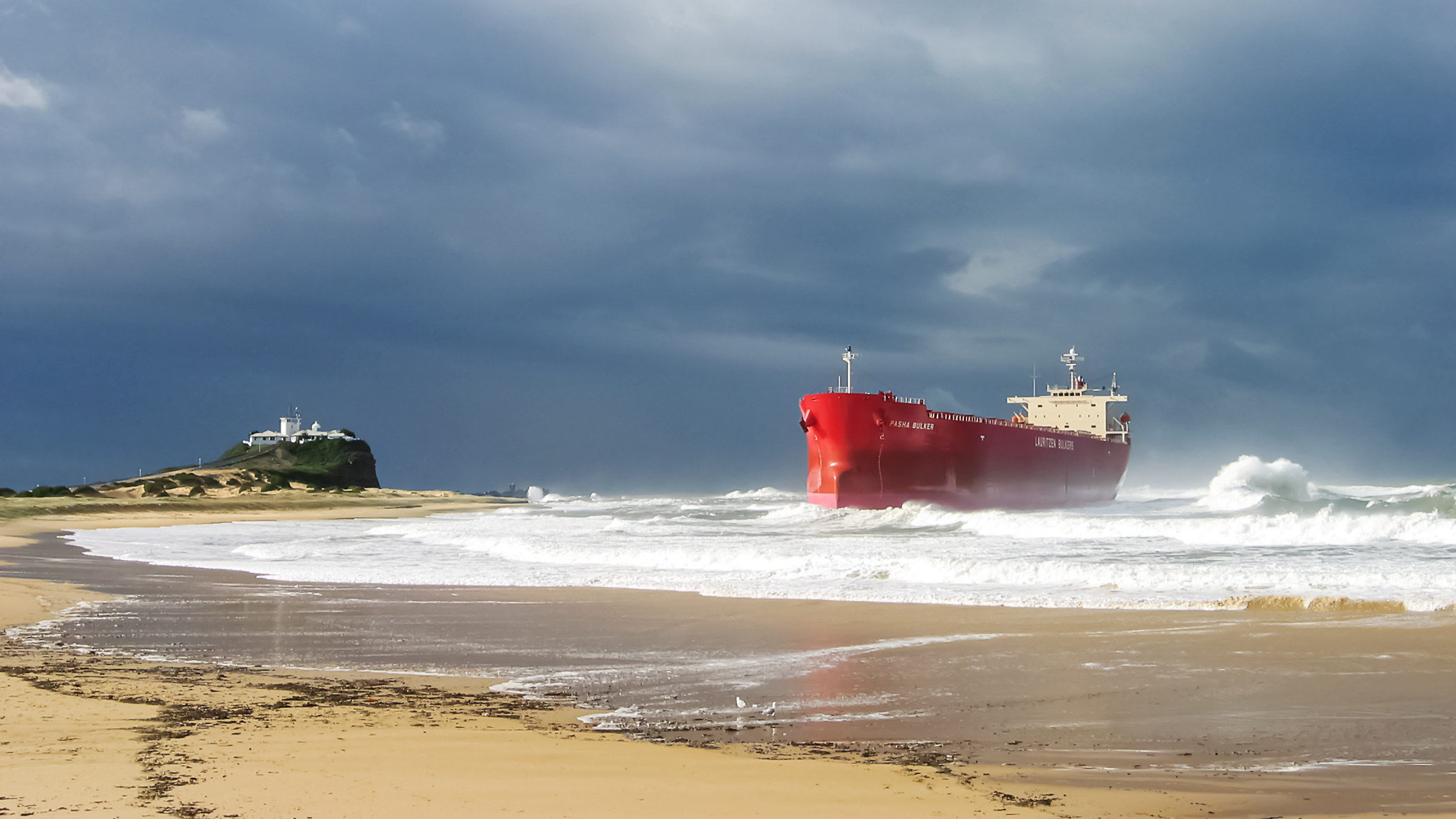
The Pasha Bulker briefly became a local landmark when it was stranded on Nobbys Beach in 2007

On 8 June 2007 the Hunter and Central Coast regions were battered by the worst series of storms to hit New South Wales in 30 years. This resulted in extensive flooding and nine deaths. Thousands of homes were flooded, and many were destroyed. The Hunter and Central Coast regions were declared natural disaster areas by the State Premier, Morris Iemma, on 8 June 2007. Further flooding was predicted by the Bureau of Meteorology but was less severe than predicted.

During the early stages of the storms, the 225-metre-long (738 ft) bulk carrier ship Pasha Bulker ran aground at Nobbys Beach after failing to heed warnings to move offshore. After the first few attempts failed, the Pasha Bulker was refloated on the third salvage attempt on 2 July 2007 despite earlier fears that the ship would break up. After initially entering the port for minor repairs, it departed under tow on 26 July 2007 for major repairs in Asia.

=== Maritime ===
On 12 July 1866, a paddle steamer the SS Cawarra, on its way to Brisbane from Newcastle carrying 61 passengers and crew, was caught in a storm as it made its way out of the harbour. Sixty people died; one survivor, Frederick Hedges, was plucked from the water by the sole survivor of Dunbar, which had sunk in Sydney Harbour nine years earlier.

The most tragic maritime accident of the 20th century in Newcastle occurred on 9 August 1934 when the Stockton-bound ferry Bluebell collided with the coastal freighter, Waraneen, and sank in the middle of the Hunter River. The collision claimed three lives and fifteen passengers were admitted to the Newcastle Hospital, with two suffering severely from the effects of immersion. It was later found that the ferry captain was at fault.

These are only two events in Newcastle's very long history of shipwrecks including the 1974 beaching of the MV Sygna, and the 2007 beaching of the Pasha Bulker.

=== Aviation ===
On 16 August 1966, an RAAF CAC Sabre crashed into the inner-city suburb of The Junction. The pilot, Flying Officer Warren William Goddard, experienced engine troubles and unsuccessfully tried to get the plane over the Pacific Ocean. The Junction is a highly populated suburb of Newcastle and most of the plane wreckage landed in the shopping area of the suburb. In 2007 a memorial plaque was unveiled for the killed pilot.

== Residential architecture ==
Examples of residential architecture in Newcastle

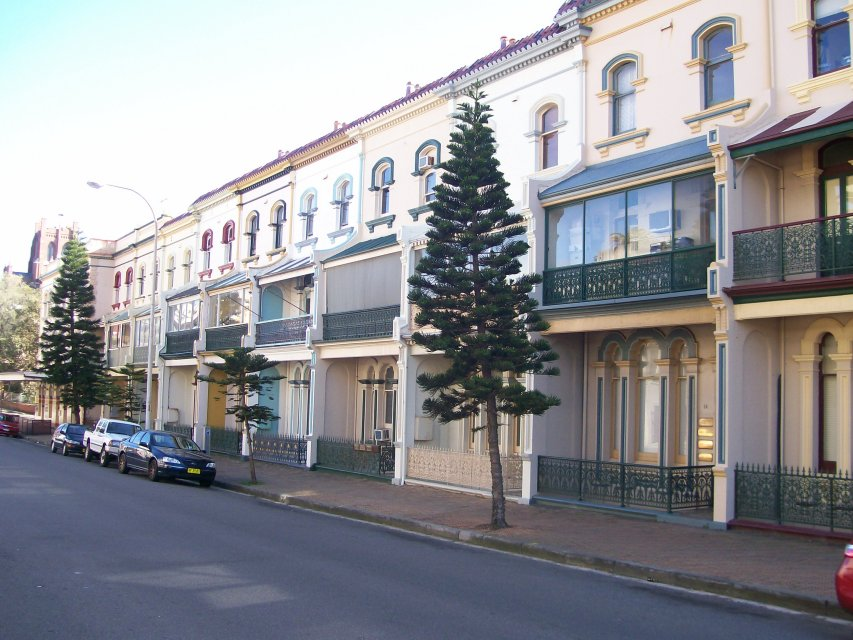
Victorian terrace streetscape

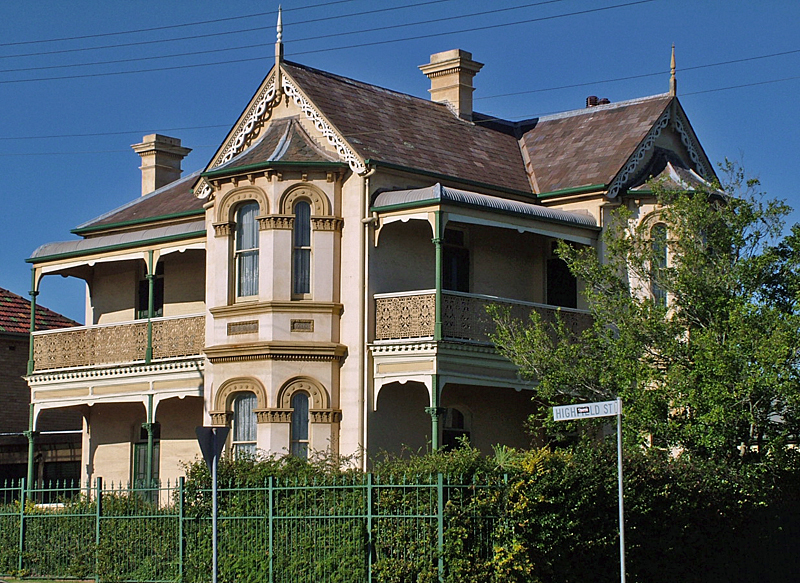
A Victorian-era house in Mayfield

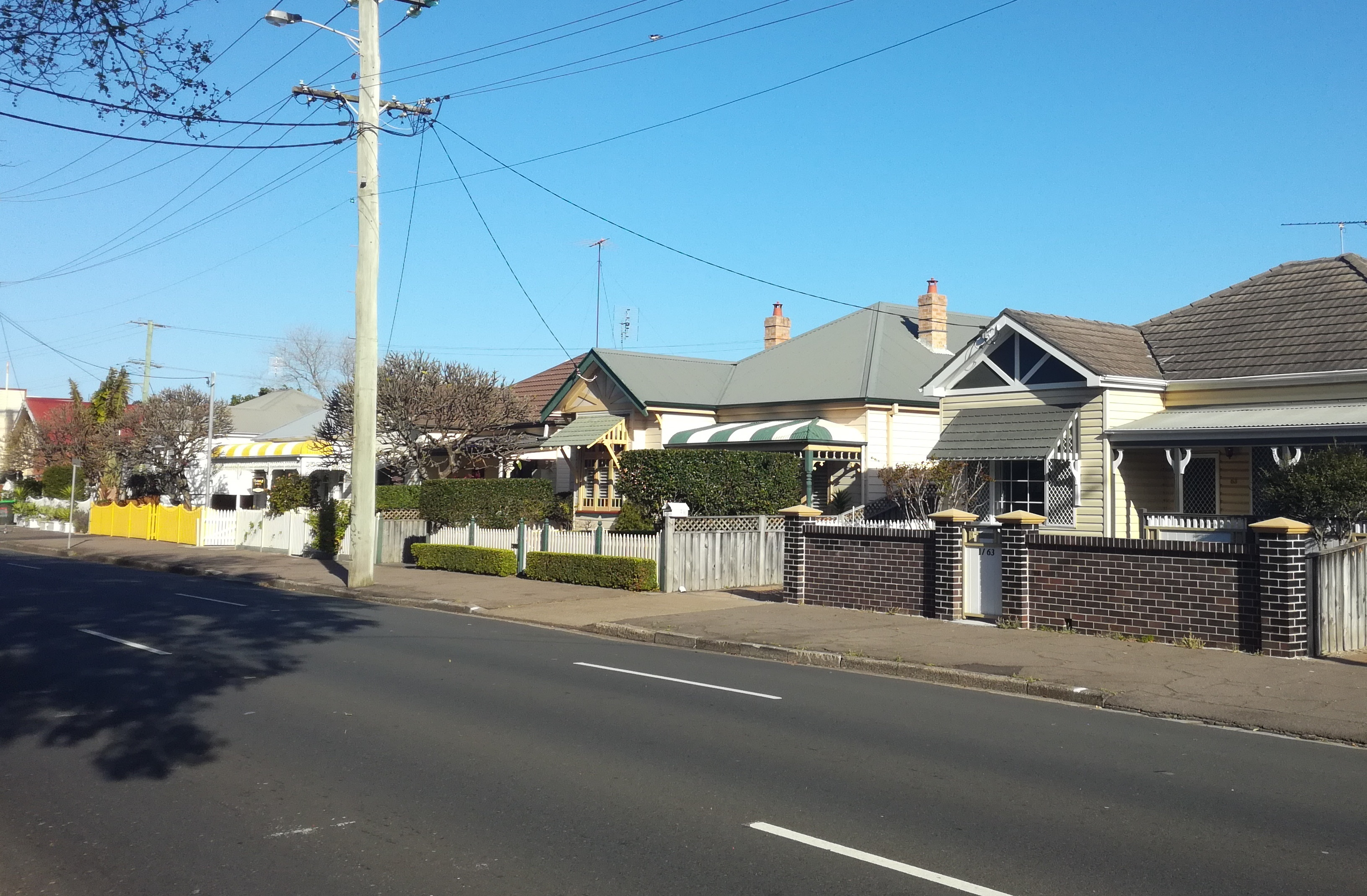
Federation-era housing

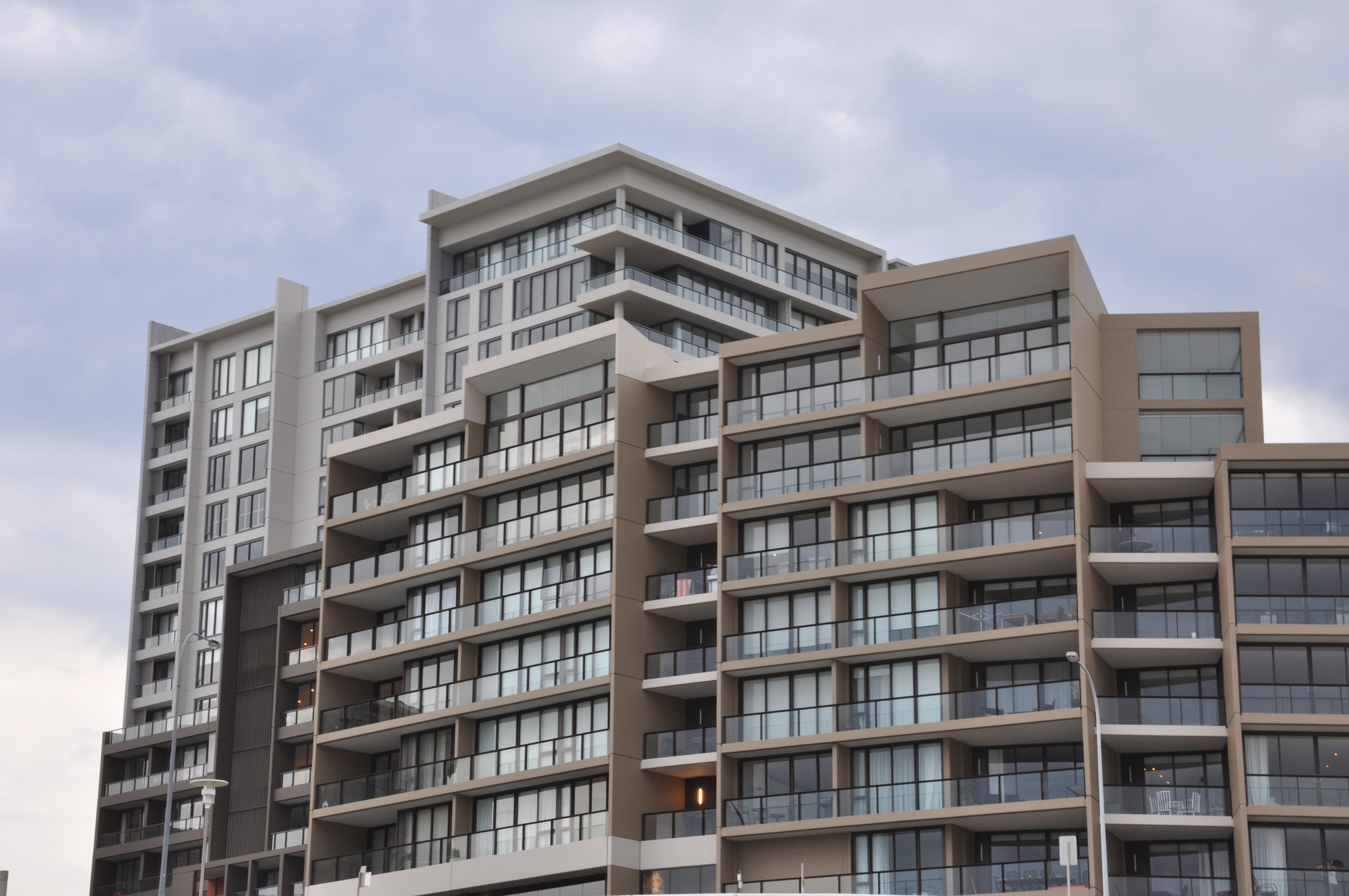
Contemporary apartments

Media related to Newcastle, New South Wales at Wikimedia Commons

Newcastle is growing significantly, and with that is seeing a boom in apartment buildings within the city. Honeysuckle HQ has been awarded to DOMA Group and is planning to transform the last 'vacant' waterfront land into a mixed-use precinct.

The tallest building in Newcastle has changed many times within recent years, with The Store East Tower claiming that title when it tops out at 107m in 2026. Wickham Tower (10 Dangar Street) plans to take that title with a planned height just short of 150m. Many other towers are currently planned which would enter the top 10 tallest buildings in Newcastle, including 10 Dangar Street (140–150m), 711 Hunter Street (110–115m), Cambridge Quarter (~85m) and Element (~70m).

=== List of tallest buildings in Newcastle ===
Rank	Name	Status	Height
1	The Store East Tower	Under Construction	107 m
2	The Store West Tower	Under Construction	100 m
3	Dairy Farmers (Tower 1)	Under Construction	98 m
4	Dairy Farmers (Tower 2)	Under Construction	83 m
5	No 1 National Park Street (Tower 1)	Completed	78.3
6	No 1 National Park Street (Tower 2)	Completed	71.6
7	Verve Residences (Tower 1)	Completed	66 m
8	Verve Residences (Tower 2)	Completed	66 m
9	Watervue	Under Construction	66 m
10	Sky Residences	Completed	64 m

== Heritage listings ==
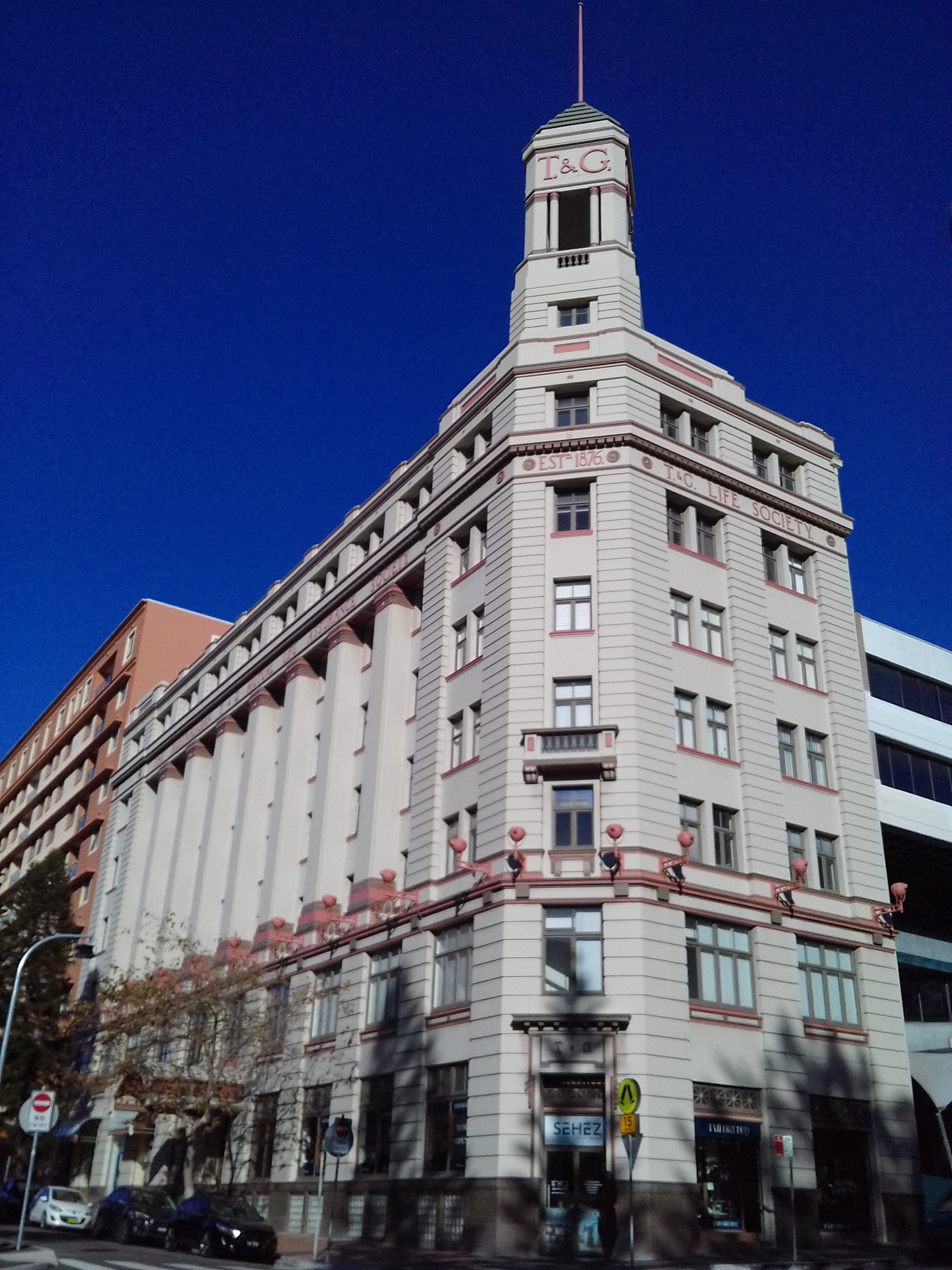
T & G Mutual Life Assurance Building

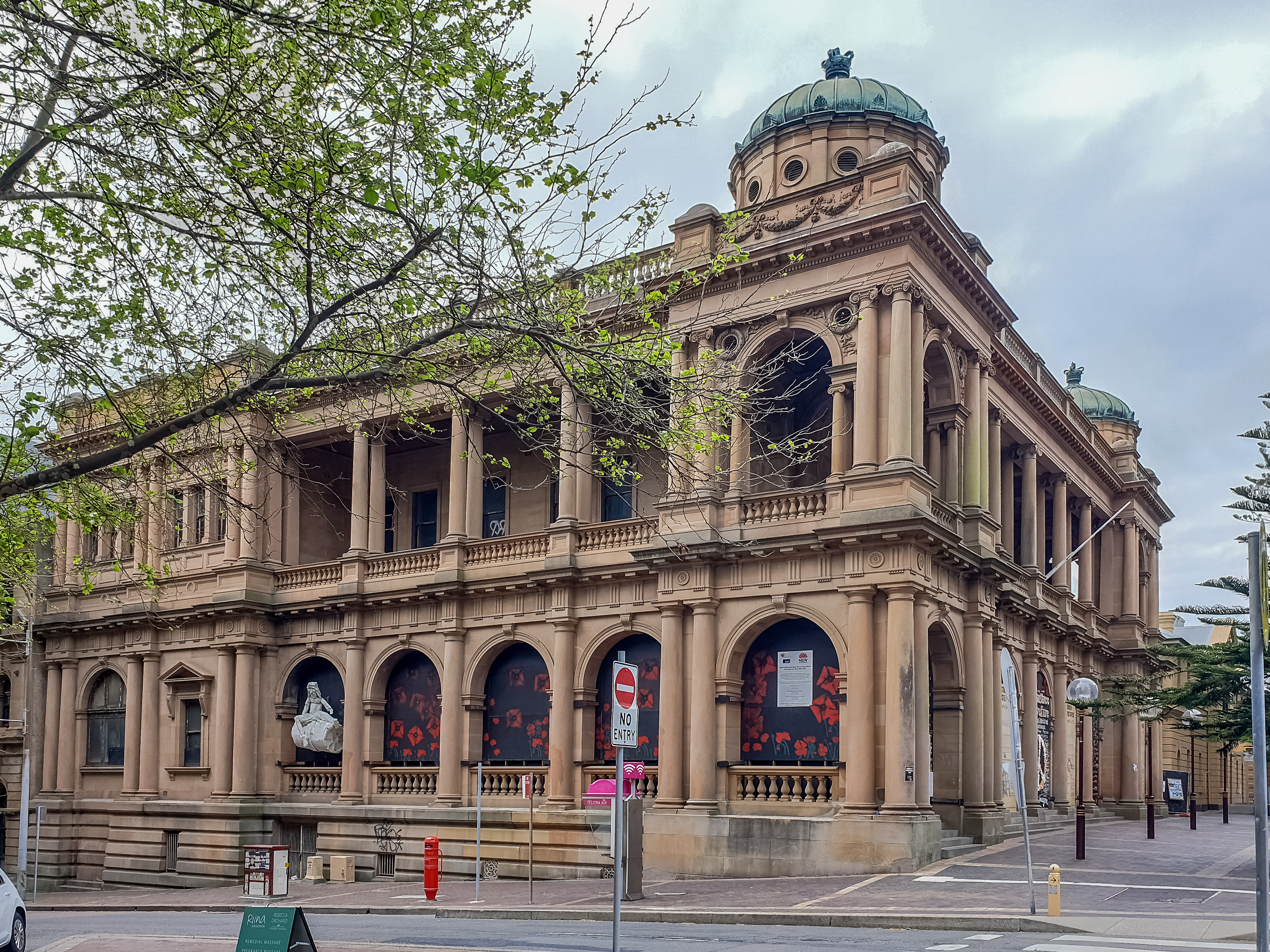
Newcastle Post Office

Newcastle has a number of heritage-listed sites, including:

- Argyle Street: Argyle House
- 48–50 Bolton Street: David Cohen & Co. Warehouse
- 58 Bolton Street: Old Newcastle East Public School
- Bond Street: Coutt's Sailors Home
- 1 Bond Street: Newcastle Customs House
- 51 Brown Street: Newcastle Reservoirs
- Church Street: Church and Watt Street Terrace Group
- 9 Church Street: Newcastle Court House
- Great Northern railway: Honeysuckle Point Railway Workshops
- Great Northern railway: Newcastle railway station
- 21 Hillcrest Road: The Ridge
- 45 Hunter Street: T & G Mutual Life Assurance Building
- 96 Hunter Street: Newcastle Post Office
- 359–361 Hunter Street: Frederick Ash Building
- 289 King Street: Newcastle City Hall
- 300 King Street: Nesca House
- 434 King Street, Newcastle West: Miss Porter's House
- Nobby's Road: Coal River Precinct
- Pacific Street: Old Newcastle Club Building
- 8–10 Perkins Street: Victoria Theatre
- 89 Scott Street: Great Northern Hotel
- 98 Scott Street: Convict Lumber Yard
- Shortland Esplande: Bogey Hole
- 41 The Terrace: Shepherds Hill military installations
- 35–37 Watt Street: Manufacturers House
- 72 Watt Street: Newcastle Government House

== Notable people/groups ==
People:

- Dora Birtles (1904–1992) – writer and journalist
- Chris Brown (born 1978) – veterinarian and TV presenter
- Danielle Marsh (born 2005) – singer and former member of NewJeans
- Morgan Evans (born 1985) - singer
- Rhys Nicholson (born 1990) – comedian and actor
- Trent Parke (born 1971) – photographer
- Albert Toll (1865–1960) – businessman and politician
- Jennifer Hawkins (1983) – Miss Universe 2004

Groups:

- The Screaming Jets – rock band
- Silverchair – rock band

== Twin towns – sister cities ==
- Ube, Yamaguchi, Japan (since 1980)
- Arcadia, California, United States

== See also ==
- List of suburbs in Greater Newcastle, New South Wales
