= Coal River Precinct =

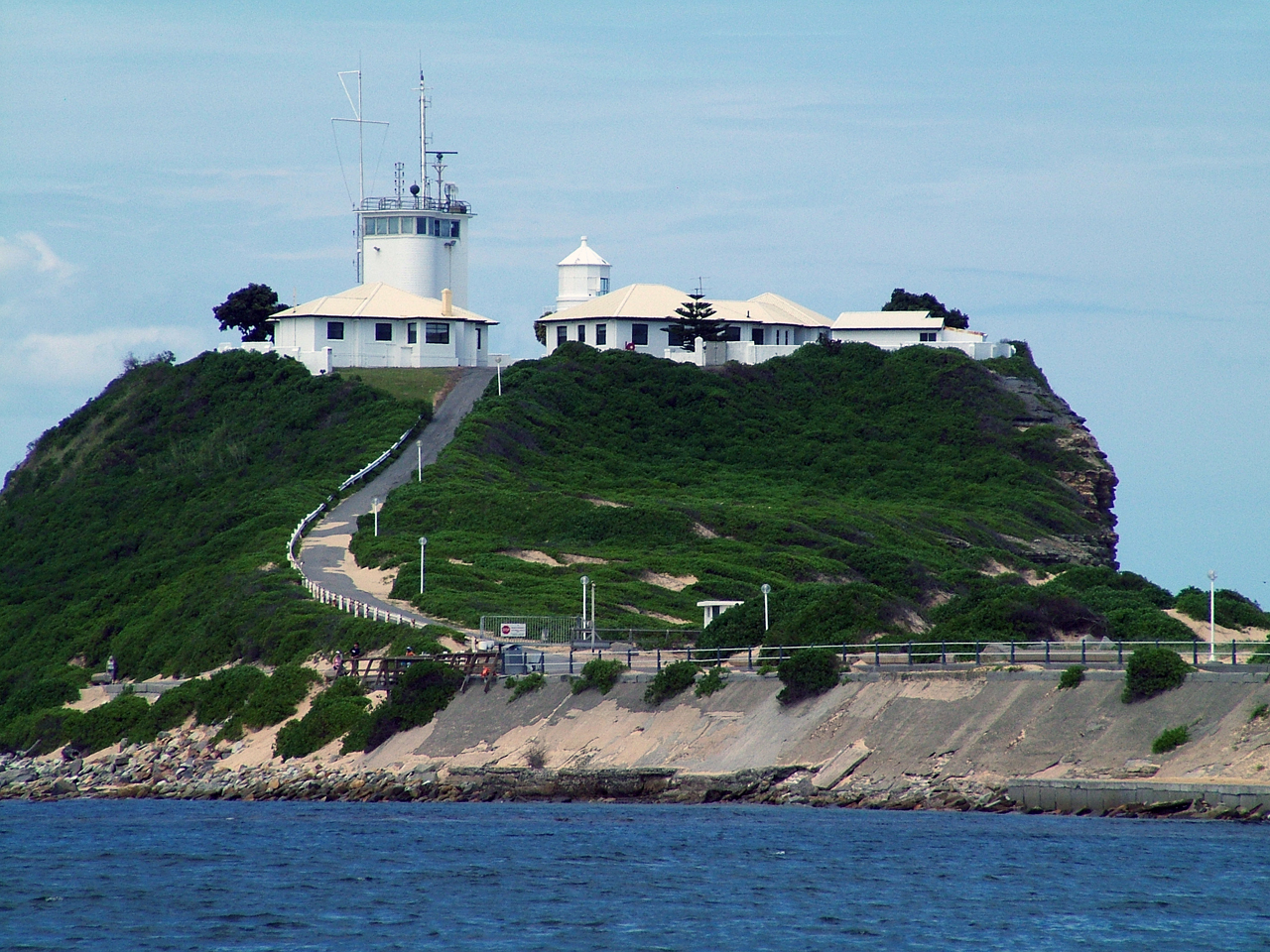
- Nobbys Head, part of the Coal River Precinct

- Location within New South Wales Location within Australia
- 32.9242°S 151.7921°E
- Location: Nobbys Road, Newcastle, New South Wales, Australia

History
- Built: 1804–1960

Site notes
- Owner: Newcastle City Council; Transport for NSW

New South Wales Heritage Register
- Official name: Coal River Precinct; Fort Scratchley; Nobby's Head; Convict Lumberyard site; Macquarie Pier; Breakwater; Nobby's Beach
- Type: state heritage (complex / group)
- Designated: 19 December 2003
- Reference no.: 1674
- Type: Historic Landscape
- Category: Landscape – Cultural

Coal River Precinct is a heritage-listed historic precinct at Nobbys Road, Newcastle, New South Wales, Australia. It was built from 1804 to 1960. It includes Fort Scratchley, Nobbys Head, the Convict Lumber Yard site, Macquarie Pier, the breakwater and Nobby's Beach. It was added to the New South Wales State Heritage Register on 19 December 2003.

== Timeline ==
- For sixty thousand years, indigenous owners maintained and preserved this country, the Awabakal and Worimi people.
- 1796 – Informal accounts reach Sydney of the reserves of coal at "Coal River".
- 1797 – Lt John Shortland and his crew enter Coal River and confirm the coal resources.
- 1801 – Formal identification of the great extraction potential of the coal reserves and the river and first and brief attempt to set up a coal mining camp.
- 1804 – Formation of a permanent convict/military outpost to mine coal, harvest timber and prepare lime. A light beacon and gun emplacement were built on the southern headland. Nobbys Island was seen as a useful place for confinement. Aboriginal-European encounters and massacres.
- 1814 – Expansion of the settlement in line with Governor Macquarie's policies. Lumberyard developed. Coal mining extends away from "Colliers" Point'. A farming outpost was established at Paterson's Plains, inland from Newcastle.
- 1816 – Marked increase in development of convict settlement from 1816 to 1822.
- 1818 – Increase in trading envisaged. Macquarie Pier commenced, also other aids to navigation. Significant expansion of building program including hospital, stores, accommodation, jail, church and windmills.
- 1822 – Penal settlement was moved to Port Macquarie. Variable convict workforce retained for public works such as 1999 New South Wales state election road making, breakwater building, coal mining, property and tools maintenance, and so on.
- 1823 – Beginning of era of transition from a penal/military establishment to a civil settlement with civil administration. Work was suspended on the Pier. The built environment of the penal era was gradually replaced.
- 1831 – End of era of government-controlled coal mining and beginning of private enterprise mining by the Australian Agricultural Company.
- 1830s – Work resumed on Pier building and was completed in 1846. Ballast and sand reclaimed the foreshore. Building wharfage and harbour formation, and pilot facilities and navigational aids were ongoing.
- 1847 – Occupation of new military barracks. Lumberyard stockade was reused for other purposes from the late 1840s.
- 1855 – The barracks complex was vacated by the Imperial military when the last convict workers left Newcastle.
- 1857 – Lighthouse was built on Nobbys Island.

South Head later was used for fortifications and colonial and then national military purposes. Newcastle East emerged as a complex rail, warehousing, industrial, commercial, residential and leisure precinct.

== Description ==
The component sites are all situated along the striking coastal topography of Newcastle Harbour's South Head: sites of Aboriginal cultural significance and occupation and probable subsurface evidence; Fort Scratchley, Signal Hill Convict Coal Mine Workings, associated post-convict coastal defences; Macquarie Pier.

The aboveground components of the precinct retain a high degree of integrity and excellent ability to demonstrate their significance. The subsurface evidence remains to be thoroughly investigated.

== Heritage listing ==
The Aboriginal presence in the Coal River area predates European contact and has been continuous to the present day. The associations, over time, of particular places, sites and areas of the Precincts and of their distinctive landforms with Aboriginal culture can be revealed, as permissible, through further consultation and study.

Coal River is one of a number of sites in Australia first settled by convict transportation. Slavery, indentured labour, convict transportation and penal settlement have contributed to the spread of diverse cultural influences throughout the world and are global heritage themes. The national significance of Fort Scratchley and the national and state significance of the Convict Lumberyard/Stockade have been recognised.

The Coal River Historic Precincts have State significance because they concentrate the whole story of the development of New South Wales' first and most important industrial centre. They encompass the site of Newcastle's first coal mine, the site of the first navigational aids for coastal shipping and Hunter River traffic, and the site of a series of fortifications designed to protect the growing settlement and its precious coal reserves. These resources are largely due to the skills and labour of transported convicts, committed for secondary punishment.

Coal River Precinct was listed on the New South Wales State Heritage Register on 19 December 2003 having satisfied the following criteria.

The place is important in demonstrating the course, or pattern, of cultural or natural history in New South Wales.

Coal River is the site of historic and continuous Aboriginal occupation, the evidence of which merits further study.

Coal River is important in the natural history of New South Wales because its resources provided Australia's first commercial export product, coal, as well as essential fuel for the Sydney settlement, and the timber and lime resources that supported the development of Sydney's built environment.

Coal River is important to the cultural history of Australia. Convict heritage provides the foundation theme of modern Australia. Convict lives dominated the early political and cultural landscape of New South Wales; much of Australia's early economic success was the result of convict labour, as is demonstrated by these precincts.

Coal River was the first penal settlement for secondary offenders established within the penal colony of New South Wales. It is significant for providing major evidence of convict colonisation and of the interrelated work and punishment orientated regime of daily life.

Coal River provides evidence of the role of the British military in the foundation of Australian colonial settlements.

Coal River, 1800 to 1821, has absolute association with convict transportation and British military guardianship. From 1821 to 1855 there evolved at Coal River a particular example of its subsequent integration with civil society and institutions.

The place has a strong or special association with a person, or group of persons, of importance of cultural or natural history of New South Wales's history.

Coal River is the site of historic and continuous Aboriginal occupation, whose evidence merits further study. Coal River has significant associations with people and events in Australian history, which await dissemination. For example, John Platt merits recognition, as a pioneer of modern mining methods in the Southern Hemisphere. The roles of Governors Hunter, King and Macquarie are significant. The Castle Hill convict rebellion played a significant part in the 1804 settlement at Coal River, as the place of secondary punishment for the Vinegar Hill rebels. Coal River's convict population awaits identification and evaluation, for example, the supporters of Governor Bligh when overthrown by the military, were exiled to Newcastle. The military commandants and other holders of administrative positions merit evaluation for their contribution to the organisation of Coal River. Evidence of their influence should be revealed. Mariners sailing the coast and those who worked in the harbour could be recognised, as well as their ships. In more recent times, Fort Scratchley was the only fortification in NSW to receive and return enemy fire, during WWII, an event still accessible, no doubt to oral historians. The educational and public interest value of this information can be used to great advantage in cultural industries today.

The place is important in demonstrating aesthetic characteristics and/or a high degree of creative or technical achievement in New South Wales.

Part of the Precincts occupy distinctive landforms whose significance in local Aboriginal cultural traditions merit further investigation.

Coal River inaugurated resource extraction and industry in Australia's major coal export port and industrial city. It is also the site of the first use of the board and pillar coal extraction method in Australia, thereby placing mining in Australia in 1801 at the technical forefront of world mining practices. This indicates transference of technology around the world. That a convict, John Platt, implemented this transfer is particularly significant. The Coal River Precincts occupy a scenic part of the city and their main and secondary sites contribute significantly to the townscape and attractions of Newcastle and Newcastle East. The combination of harbour, nineteenth and early twentieth century buildings and Signal Hill forms one of the finest coastal and maritime townscapes in New South Wales.

The place has strong or special association with a particular community or cultural group in New South Wales for social, cultural or spiritual reasons.

The Aboriginal presence in this area predates European contact and has been continuous to the present day. The associations, over time, of particular places, sites and areas of the Precincts and of their distinctive landforms with Aboriginal culture will be revealed, as permissible, through further consultation and study.

Descendants of the early generation of convict workers that founded Newcastle as an industrial city take pride in the contribution of their forebears. However, research needs to be undertaken to identify the convict workforce. Coal River has significance as the place of contact between Aboriginal and European people in the northern region. Aboriginal people continued to frequent the locality during the convict era and their descendants continue to live in the Newcastle area. Coal River is closely associated with the Newcastle community today because the key and secondary sites have played and continue to play an important and changing role in the lives of successive generations.

Coal River is significant as a latent resource with great educational and recreational potential, to be presented to the community using excellent, up-to-date methods in a central, outstanding venue, where interpretation of the convict/military history of Newcastle can be presented and linked to pre and post settlement themes.

Coal River provides the potential to reconstruct the convict/military community as a dynamic whole, reflecting the dominance of Sydney and the development of trade. Interpretation of Coal River as a single entity will enable unification of elements that have been dismembered by subsequent development and urban evolution.

The place has potential to yield information that will contribute to an understanding of the cultural or natural history of New South Wales.

The precinct's significance to Aboriginal people requires further investigation. Its distinctive landforms are likely to have a role in local traditional knowledge. Evidence of Aboriginal activities will probably occur within the Precincts, wherever European development has not destroyed it. Investigation of the convict coalmines may reveal the skills and technical achievements of Australia's first coal miners. Investigation of the core of Macquarie's Pier may reveal the technical achievement of quarrying and masonry work carried out by the convict workforce.

Concerted presentation of Coal River has the potential to increase understanding of the origins of modern Australia, the origin of settlement in the Hunter Valley and the subsequent history of Newcastle. Coal River demonstrates the capabilities of the convict workforce to undertake not only mining, but also quarrying, timber getting, lime burning, building and industrial trades, farming and gardening, navigation and harbour work, as well as improvising in a frontier environment.

Coal River invites further archaeological investigations that may reveal the routines of daily life for both the convict and military population, especially convict coalmining, quarrying and pier building, additional to that contained in documentation.

Fort Scratchley makes a considerable contribution to the military history of New South Wales. It was as significant a part of the anti Russian defences of the colony as the defences of Port Jackson. In fact, Fort Scratchley survives as the most concentrated and complete example of the whole system and certainly the one with the best exemplified changing military history.

The place possesses uncommon, rare or endangered aspects of the cultural or natural history of New South Wales.

Coal River, a convict/military settlement for prisoners guilty of colonial offences is one of few such convict settlements in Australia, and was the earliest such settlement. Evidence of convict workplaces, coal mining, pier building, quarrying, and other activities are rare in Australia. The role of British military in the foundation of colonial society is little studied and the example of Coal River could make a valuable contribution to cultural studies. The period of transition from military rule to civil administration is of great interest and educational value and is rare in Australian settlement history and society.

The place is important in demonstrating the principal characteristics of a class of cultural or natural places/environments in New South Wales.

Coal River and its sites demonstrate the characteristics of a convict settlement administered by military, 1801 to c. 1821, phasing out between 1821 and 1855. From Lieutenant Menzies' to Captain Wallis' commands, the military played a central role in designing and constructing Coal River. This is the foundation of modern Newcastle and Newcastle Harbour.

== See also ==
- Military history of Australia
- Media related to Coal River Precinct at Wikimedia Commons
