= Coutt's Sailors Home =

Heritage-listed building in Newcastle, New South Wales

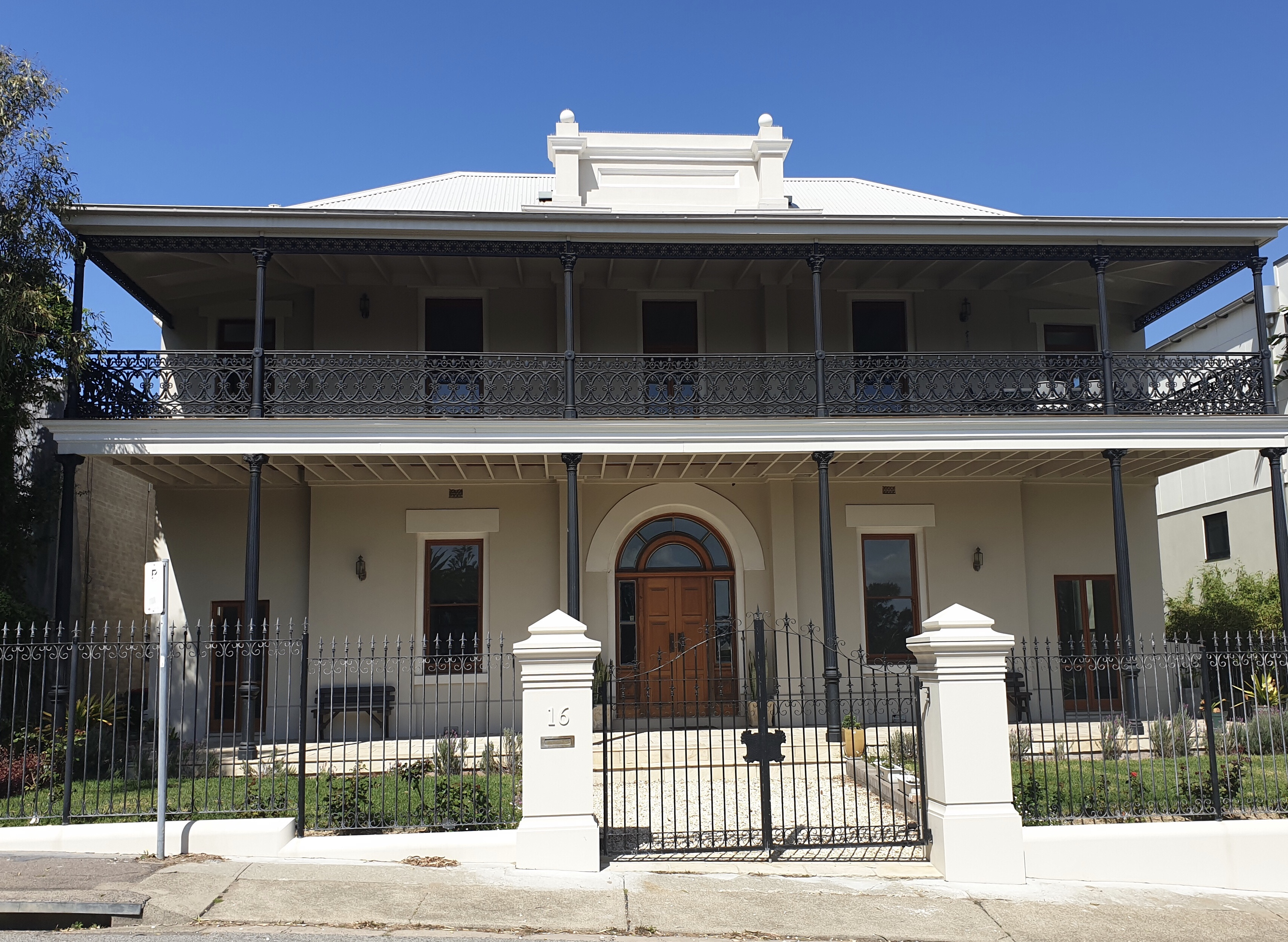

- Location within New South Wales Location within Australia
- 32.9269°S 151.7850°E
- Location: 16 Bond Street, Newcastle, City of Newcastle, New South Wales, Australia

History
- Built: 1882–1882

Site notes
- Architect: George Brown

New South Wales Heritage Register
- Official name: Enterprise Park and Coutt's Sailors Home (former); Coutts Sailors Rest Home; Convict Lumberyard
- Type: state heritage (built)
- Designated: 22 March 2011
- Reference no.: 1842
- Type: Housing & Quarters
- Category: Maritime Industry
- Builders: Robert Muirhead

Coutt's Sailors Home is a heritage-listed former sailor's home, health clinic, government office building and now residence at 16 Bond Street, Newcastle, New South Wales, Australia. It was designed by George Brown and built in 1882 by Robert Muirhead. It is also known as Coutt's Sailors Rest Home. It was added to the New South Wales State Heritage Register on 22 March 2011.

== History ==
Newcastle East, where Coutts Sailor Home is located, is a historically significant area, with several sites associated with the early penal settlement and maritime history, including: Australia's first mine, together with the Hunter Region's first hospital, original fort; first signal station, first primitive lighthouse, first jail; and the Convict Lumber Yard, situated very close to the study site and extending across its north western corner. Convicts lived and worked within the lumber yard between 1814 and c. 1850 and it was the centre of the skilled and semi-skilled trades carried on in the settlement. At the northern end of this area, in George Street (now Watt Street) was Newcastle's first wharf, the first stage of the substantial port improvement program that has been progressively implemented. From 1818 until 1846 a massive breakwater was constructed between Nobby's Island and the mainland in order to improve the entrance to the port.

In Newcastle, the gradual development of the shipping industry, particularly from the 1820s, was important to the East End, where ships have been serviced since the earliest days of settlement. From the mid-nineteenth century Newcastle's importance as a sea port grew, stimulated by the activities of the Australian Agricultural Company and the steadily growing coal trade; with the Hunter River rail line transporting general cargo to and from the port. Piloting, lighthouse keeping, life boat services, tug boat services, customs administration - with the Newcastle Customs House built in 1876 - wharf labouring and ship chandlering have flourished in the eastern section of Newcastle, establishing strong links with the sea and maritime activities, with which Coutts Sailors' Home is also associated.

During the latter half of the nineteenth century, most of the sailors who came to Newcastle were forced to spend a long time in port while their ships took on cargo. These sailors often roamed the streets for periods of up to three months, and, with no refuge, were prey to grog sellers and other dangers. It therefore became a matter of urgency to provide them with a safe place to sleep and for recreation while in port. The "Newcastle Morning Herald" noted on 24 February 1881, that, "it has long been a most disgraceful fact that Newcastle, the second shipping port in the colony (and whose annual tonnage has occasionally even exceeded that of Port Jackson) is without a Sailors' Home". References were made to sailors' homes that had been built in Britain, from the 1860s, such as 'a fine building designed for the port of Liverpool and the late Prince Albert, who took so much interest in matters affecting the social well-being of the people.'

A Sailors' Home had been established at Circular Quay in Sydney in 1864. The Home had its origins in the worldwide benevolent movement dedicated to the elevation of the sailor's condition and character. By the 1860s such institutions were considered essential to any sizeable British port, providing clean, comfortable, inexpensive board and lodging for sailors and other persons of all nationalities employed in sea-going ships and vessels. The Sydney Sailor's Home was modelled on the Brunswick Maritime Establishment in London's Docklands. The Home, with additions and modifications, served in its original function until the 1970s when seamen's wages and conditions improved to the extent that the standard of accommodation provided by the Home was no longer adequate and use declined.

In 1880, Reverend James Coutts M.A., who had come to St Andrew's Presbyterian Church in 1861 as Minister, began to agitate for a sailors' home to be established in Newcastle. Coutts' deceased wife was the daughter of a sailor and he sympathised with their hardships. Coutts offered to give £1,000 and endeavour to raise another £1,000 if the Government of New South Wales would provide a suitable site for the home. Sir Henry Parkes agreed to grant a site for the Home and as a result, on 29 June 1880 an area of 1 rood 24 perches, with a frontage of 66 feet was dedicated in Scott Street, where the home was subsequently erected, close to the harbour and Customs House. The land, east of Newcastle station, was regarded as railway land, but the Government proceeded with its dedication for a "Sailors" Home' and the area was placed under the control of trustees - David Tait Allan, Alexander Brown and Thomas Innes - to whom a Crown grant was issued on 30 October 1880.

The Sailors' Home was erected partly by contributions from the public and partly by Government endowments. At a public meeting on 5 April 1881 a building committee was elected consisting of C. H. Hannell, Joseph Wood, Richard Hall and Lieut. Commander F. Gardner. The "Newcastle Morning Herald and Miners' Advocate" ran editorials encouraging readers to donate to the building fund. One such appeal stressed the regard and esteem accorded seamen and their importance to Newcastle: "It may be urged what are sailors more than other men that citizens should trouble about them more than any other class. To this it may be replied that were it not for sailors, this port and many others would never risen (sic) to the political and social importance which they now possess. Our magnificent coal fields would be comparatively valueless were it not for the readiness of our sailors to take our staple commodity away in all weathers, Jack has to be at his post and at every risk must use his best endeavours to bring his ship to port."

The public's response to the appeal for funds was not as great as anticipated, however, and so a modified plan for the building was agreed upon. The formal ceremony for the laying of the foundation stone took place on 17 March 1882. The event was so important for Newcastle that the Government proclaimed a public holiday. Shipping in the port and all buildings were decorated with flags and bunting and large numbers of people came from all the outlying areas to witness the ceremony. The laying of the stone was preceded by a march to the site by naval and military volunteers headed by a brass band. At the ceremony, a bottle was placed in the cavity beneath the foundation stone containing Newcastle and Sydney newspapers of the day, coins and other details of those associated with the building. Subsequent attempts to locate the foundation stone and capsule have failed and it appears that it has been removed or completely obscured during subsequent alterations.

The building was designed by Sydney architect, George Brown, who had offices in Sydney and Maitland. The builder was Robert Muirhead. The building work progressed rapidly and public interest was maintained by continual reports in the "Newcastle Morning Herald". On 18 December 1882 the building was completed and it was handed over to the Committee on 24 February 1883. A marble plaque just inside the rear entrance states that it was erected in 1881 but this is incorrect. The plaque is apparently a later addition which possibly took the place of the missing foundation stone. On 19 December 1882, the Sailors' Home was described by the Herald as consisting of "a brick and concrete structure with an external measurement of 54 feet depth by 55 feet frontage to the harbour, double winged." The basement 'comprised ten large and airy rooms including Secretary's office, reception rooms, reading and sitting rooms, dining rooms, scullery, laundry etc., storeroom, serving room and kitchen with large colonnade and passages; also a 9 foot hall right through. A broad and ornate staircase with a continuous cedar hand rail leads to the upper section, which consists of 6 bedrooms capable of accommodating, without overcrowding, about 70 persons. The Keeper's room and Smokers' rooms are also upon this floor whilst the various departments are separated by a lofty passage 9 feet wide which commanded a splendid view of the harbour through a large bay window at its northern extremity.'

In June 1883 a tea party was held to introduce Sailors to the home and was attended by about 500 people, including women representing each church in Newcastle. A Ball was held in September to commemorate the opening and 100 ladies and gentlemen attended. In the same year the Coutts Sailors' Home women's auxiliary was formed. In 1884 Reverend Coutts died, however the building served as a constant reminder of his social improvement programs.

Between the original home's completion in 1882 and 1897 two wings were added onto the south side, forming a three-sided rear court. These additions were possibly part of the original design that had to be modified due to lack of funds. In 1897 Frederick Menkens, well known Newcastle architect was commissioned to build the Superintendent's residence. This formed an elongation of the west wing to the south of the home and faced onto Scott Street.

By the turn of the century, however, owing to competition from other boarding houses in Newcastle, the home was not as well supported as expected. It is not known whether a Superintendent ever occupied the residence constructed for same. In 1910 it was suggested that a school of navigation be established there, where intending mariners could be taught their profession. It is unknown whether this was ever implemented. By 1910 the Home had declined in condition. The accommodation charges were noted as 18 shillings a week for seamen and 1 pound for officers. The house was furnished poorly, and "absolutely insufficient even for a sailors" home.'

The Sailor's Home received Government assistance for maintenance, however, in 1933, the Trustees declared that they were unable to continue to manage the Home. By the 1930s fewer ships were calling at Newcastle and the Home was becoming unviable. The Railway Authorities then negotiated for the land, but the Treasury department decided to vest the site as an addition to the Newcastle Hospital. In December 1934, the site dedicated for the Sailor's Home was revoked and the reduced area - 1 rood 13 perches - which by then excluded Bond Street, was re-dedicated on 27 December 1935 for addition to the Hospital site. In addition, a further area of about 10 1/2 perches adjoining this land on the north-west, with about a 40-foot frontage to Bond Street, by a depth of about 80 feet, was surrendered by the Railway Department and dedicated as an addition to the Hospital site on 2 September 1938.

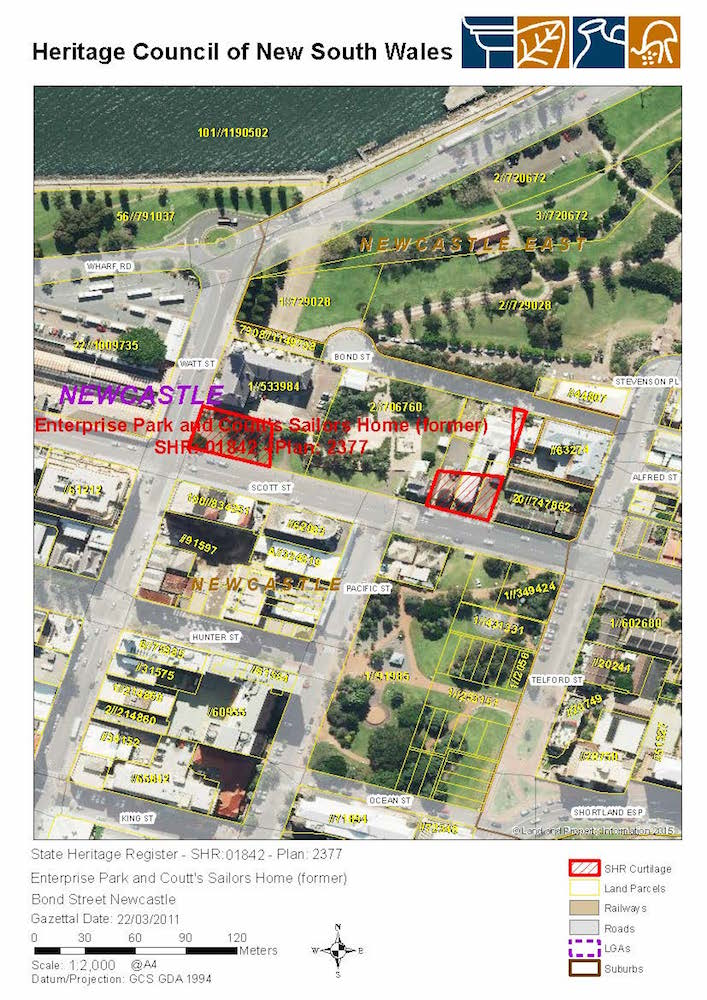
Heritage boundaries

In 1936, Jeater, Rodd and Hay, honorary architects for Newcastle Hospital, were instructed to prepare plans for converting the Home into a clinic for Sister Elizabeth Kenny. While this firm prepared the necessary plans for the work, at the last minute the job was transferred to the New South Wales Government Architect. In 1938 it became the Sister Kenny Poliomyelitis Clinic. Elizabeth Kenny was an Australian bush nurse who discovered a revolutionary treatment for infantile paralysis and devoted her life to the dissemination of this treatment throughout Australia and abroad. She went against traditional treatments for polio and urged that the stricken limbs be exercised. Between 1935 and 1940 she traveled extensively throughout Australia helping to set up clinics. In 1940 the Government of New South Wales sent Kenny to America to present her clinical method for treating polio victims to American doctors. Several clinics were also established across the US.

Sister Kenny's clinic was shortlived, being transferred from the Home in 1941 when the Infectious Diseases Hospital, Western Suburbs was opened. Between 1938 and 1941 Dr Ethel Burn had a chest clinic in the building. Following the transfer of the poliomyelitis clinic, it was decided that the Home should be re-modelled as a maternity hospital. When the alterations were almost complete, however, the Chief Gynaecologist at the Hospital declared the building unfit for that purpose because of all the dirt and dust from the railway station and the Zaara Street Power Station, so that project was abandoned.

For the next ten years the building was left almost entirely vacant. However, during the latter part of World War 2 it became a store for air raid precautions gear. Soon after the War the Chief Radiographer at the Hospital occupied part of the ground floor, whilst the Hospital Social Club held their meetings in another part of the building. In 1949 sketch plans were drawn up by the Hospital's architects, for the site's conversion to a Nurses' Home, but plans for this fell through.

According to the terms of the re-dedication in 1935, the land was given as a "deed of gift" to the Hospital until the Hospital no longer wanted it. In 1952 the Hospital returned the land to the State Government. The Government then used it to house its various offices, including the Departments of Education, Health, Mines, Weights and Measures and Labour and Industry.

During the alterations required to convert the building to the headquarters of NSW State Government Departments in Newcastle, the Superintendent's verandah was demolished. The columns from this verandah were used to form the supports for a new verandah along the eastern side of the west wing.

When the building was originally constructed, the main approach was from the north (harbour side); today it has switched to the southern side, giving direct access to the commercial centre of Newcastle. This change was extremely detrimental to the original conception. The results of the buildings' adaptations to different functions over the years has resulted in the gradual desecration of the original home. It has been added to, altered and mutilated in many directions so that today it is very hard to appreciate the former beauty it once possessed.

During the 1980s controversy erupted when it was discovered that a former chapel in the grounds of the site was being used as men's lavatory. It is believed that the chapel dates from the time of the construction of the Sailors' Home in 1882. Chapels were an important part of seamen's missions and could be used by the sailors of all denominations. There is also the possibility that it was Reverend Coutts' private chapel. The former chapel had been converted to a lavatory in the 1950s when various State Government departments' offices occupied the site. When the property was acquired by the Department of Youth and Community Services in 1984 it was planned to restore the former chapel and possibly use it as a meeting room. However there was a strong movement within the local community for its re-instatement as a chapel.

In recent times the former Sailors' Home has been used by the Department of Youth and Community Services and as a centre for volunteer groups and a crisis centre for drug dependents.

In 1990 a Permanent Conservation Order was placed on the adjacent convict lumber yard and in 1992 the former Coutts Sailors' Home was listed on Schedule 2 of the Hunter Regional Environment Plan. In the same year a Public Works Department report on the building condition estimated repair costs of $1,000,000. The building was classified by the National Trust of Australia in 1995 and 1997. Newcastle City Council considered using the building as a Maritime Museum, however this did not eventuate. In 1996 a Plan of Management for a Community Resource Centre was prepared for a joint venture between Newcastle City Council and the State Government. Repair work was estimated at $500,000 and restoration at $1,000,000. In 1996 the Council and Hunter Area Health committed funds of $50,000 per organisation towards the $500,000 urgent maintenance work.

For several years the State Government has tried to transfer the building to Newcastle City Council under a Land Acquisition at nil compensation. Council has so far declined the offer due to the enormous repair costs involved. In 2001 the State Government transferred title to the former Sailors' Home and the land on which it stands to the Awabakal Aboriginal Land Council following a land claim lodged with the Department of Land and Water Conservation by that group. The Land Council was considering developing the property as an Aboriginal art gallery and bush tucker restaurant. These plans failed to materialise and the property remained vacant and neglected until 2014.

In January 2014, Alastair and Diane Kinloch purchased the run-down building. They renovated the entire building as their own residence in December 2015.

== Description ==
The 1882 Sailors' Home is a two-storey symmetrical building erected in the Victorian Italianate style. Walls are of brick construction with set plaster and cement rendering. The hipped roof is clad with corrugated asbestos, replacing the original galvanised iron. Eaves are close and feature ornate stone bracketing at the cornice level of the main wing. Paired moulded chimney stacks are located on the western wing.

The north (Bond Street) facade comprises three bays with the main entrance through the central bay. The central bay is adorned by a modest parapet and is flanked by engaged piers. A verandah was added to the first floor facade in 1897 by the architect, Frederick Menkens. The verandah extends the full length of the north facade and is divided in five divisions by decorative cast iron columns and infilled at either end with light weight construction. The cast iron columns of this verandah, including those of the ground floor, remain intact, providing tangible evidence of the classical detailing afforded this residence. The two side bays of this verandah have been enclosed. The front door including a semi-circular fanlight is original. The windows are generally double-hung sash but have been covered over by boards. On either side of the original main wing new masonry rooms have been added at a lower height than the main entablature of the building.

The east and west facade are similar. The original volume of the building has been enveloped in the 1897 verandah, room extension and wrap around verandah. The windows in this infill are smaller than the original. To the rear, the two storey wing shows evidence of the line of the original single storey. Where this wing has been extended at the first floor a new facade has been added which forms an awkward junction.

At the rear of the building (Scott Street) the site is dominated by the former Superintendent's Residence a two-storey rendered and painted brick building in Victorian Italianate style, designed by Menkens in 1897, extending southerly to Scott Street on the western side of the main building. This residence features a central projecting bay flanked by two symmetrical bays. Elongated windows with decorative masonry heads and sills adorn each facade surface on both storeys. The first floor balcony/verandah of this residence was removed in the 1950s during the site's conversion to Government offices. The columns from this verandah were used to form the supports for a new verandah along the eastern side of the west wing. The roof is clad with corrugated asbestos sheets and two corbelled chimneys exist.

To the east of the Superintendent's residence part of the rear of the Sailor's Home is visible, with various unsympathetic additions such as infilled balcony and a car port.

Interior

(NB: The following description is based on the Heritage Study undertaken by Architectural Projects Pty Ltd in October 2002.).

The interior layout of the 1882 Sailors' Home is symmetrical with a central loaded corridor which provides access to a sequence of three rooms on each side. The first, a square room, was extended in 1897 to match the size of the adjacent two rooms. The corridor leads to a verandah which has been modified in the 1920s. The corridor provides access, via the enclosed verandah to two wings which were originally one storey. The upper level repeats a similar plan to the ground floor. The stairs are located at the end of the original corridor.

The interior plan of the Superintendent's Residence is asymmetrical with a corridor on the [west] at both floors providing access to a sequence of three rooms at both levels. The interior features a sequence of well proportioned spaces which are lit by high double hung windows.

The interior of the former Sailors' Home retains much of the original planning, including the vestibule entrance, two former dining rooms and library. Many of the original partitioning walls remain. The skirting boards and internal doors are all original. The stair, originally providing access to the dormitories located on the first floor, is original. Many of the dormitory rooms remain intact. However, much of the internal detail has been removed.

=== Modifications and dates ===
- 1883–1897 – two wings added onto the south side, forming a three-sided rear court. This extension was originally a single storey. At a later stage another storey was added to these wings (date unknown).
- 1897 – Superintendent's Residence built.
- 1936–1938 – Sailors' Home converted to Sister Kenny Poliomylitis Clinic.
- 1950 – Former Chapel converted to toilet block.
- 1950s – Adaptation of building for use as NSW Government offices
- 1960s–1970s – Modifications relating to use by Education Department. Original float and plaster walls rendered in hard cement; other walls veneer clad; verandahs infilled etc. Resulting in much of the original building's features being hidden.
- 2014–2015 – Building completely refurbished for residential use.

== Heritage listing ==
The former Coutts Sailors' Home site is historically significant at a state and possibly national level as it is associated with several important phases of human activity and occupation in Newcastle's, NSW's and Australia's history, including the convict era, maritime activities, health care, government administration and community welfare. The site is chiefly significant for its role as a Sailors' Home, reflecting the importance of Newcastle's maritime history and representing an international benevolent movement concerned with the welfare of seamen in British ports throughout the world that developed in the 1860s.

Established in 1882 through private and public philanthropic efforts, Coutts Sailors' Home was the only other such institution established outside Sydney, making it rare in NSW and possibly Australia and reflecting Newcastle's status as a major national and international port and also the esteem with which sailors and seamen were held by the community at a time when shipping was crucial to international trade and communication. Newcastle's development as a port has shaped much of its economic and social history.

The Sailors' Home is one of several buildings in the Newcastle East precinct, including the Customs House, which reflect the historic links that the area has with maritime activities. The site has been associated with a number of individuals of significance to Newcastle, NSW and Australia including founder, Reverend James Coutts; architects George Brown and Frederick Menkens; and Sister Elizabeth Kenny.

Part of the site once formed part of the convict lumber yard, a site of key importance to the local economy and representative of Newcastle's early history as a penal settlement. The possibility of archaeological evidence existing from this period of occupation as well as the buildings' ability to demonstrate something of the design layout and construction methods associated with the buildings' functions over time also contributes to its high degree of research significance. At a local level, the buildings are aesthetically significant as one of the largest and most intact examples of the Victorian Italianate architectural style in this part of Newcastle.

Coutt's Sailors Home was listed on the New South Wales State Heritage Register on 22 March 2011 having satisfied the following criteria.

The place is important in demonstrating the course, or pattern, of cultural or natural history in New South Wales.

The former Coutts Sailors' Home is historically significant at a local, state and possibly national level primarily because it is associated with an important phase in Newcastle's and NSW's maritime history and reflects Newcastle's emergence in the late nineteenth century as a major national and international sea port. Together with other buildings nearby, including the adjacent residence at 90 Scott Street, former Berthing Master's residence, former Water Police cottages opposite, the Customs House and the C. H. & Earp Gillam Bond Store, it is part of a precinct in East Newcastle that has a long association with Newcastle's maritime past. The Sailors' Home also represents a broader international benevolent movement that developed in Britain from the 1860s that was concerned with sailors' welfare in British ports around the globe. The Sailors' Home is one of only two such institutions in NSW, the other established in Sydney in 1864. These institutions reflect the philosophies of a period in which shipping was the chief means of international trade and demonstrate the high regard in which seamen were held by society generally, as well as Newcastle's status as an international port. The Sailors' Home also reflects a combination of both private and state philanthropic efforts that made possible its establishment.

Part of the north western corner of the site on which the former Sailors' Home stands was part of the convict lumber yard that was a key convict work site from c. 1814 to 1850, reflecting another important phase in Newcastle's history - that of a penal settlement. Thus, the site as a whole is highly significant for its ability to demonstrate a number of historical phases and layers of use and occupation.

The place has a strong or special association with a person, or group of persons, of importance of cultural or natural history of New South Wales's history.

The site is chiefly significant for its association with Reverend James Coutts, Minister of St Andrews Presbyterian Church, whose philanthropy and concern for the condition of sailors visiting the port of Newcastle was instrumental in establishing the Sailors' Home, for whom it was named.

The Superintendent's residence built in 1897 is associated with renowned Newcastle architect, Frederick Menkens, who was responsible for several notable buildings in the region.

The site also has some association with Sister Elizabeth Kenny, functioning for a few years from the late 1930s as the Sister Kenny Poliomylitis Clinic. Sister Kenny achieved international recognition for her revolutionary treatment of polio in the late 1930s and 1940s. Several such clinics were established across Australia and America, however, it is not clear to what extent Sister Kenny was directly involved in this clinic.

The place is important in demonstrating aesthetic characteristics and/or a high degree of creative or technical achievement in New South Wales.

The former Sailors' Home and Superintendent's residence are architecturally significant as substantially intact examples of the Victorian Italianate style of the late nineteenth century. The building is one of the largest and most intact examples of this style in the east end of Newcastle. The building is particularly noted for its use of classical proportion. Despite ostensibly being in poor repair and having been unsympathetically modified, the building has the potential to reflect much of its original design and fabric if restoration were to be undertaken.

The place has strong or special association with a particular community or cultural group in New South Wales for social, cultural or spiritual reasons.

While no investigation of this aspect of the site's significance was possible within this review, it is unlikely that any identifiable "community" of sailors now exists for which the former Sailors' Home would still hold particular significance, given that its use as a Sailors' Home had declined by the early twentieth century. However, the buildings have been utilised by various sections of the Newcastle community over the years and it is likely that the former Sailors' Home is valued by those who have had some association with it - including health care workers and patients, government employees and various community groups. The outrage expressed in the 1980s at the discovery that the former chapel had been converted to a lavatory, and demands for its re-instatement provides some indication that the site and its history are valued by the local community.

The place has potential to yield information that will contribute to an understanding of the cultural or natural history of New South Wales.

The site may have archaeological potential as the convict lumber yard, which operated from 1814 to c. 1850 extended beneath the north-west corner of the site. It therefore has the potential to reveal something of the area's penal history. The lumber yard is commemorated in an interpretive park on the adjoining allotment.

The buildings themselves have the potential to yield information relating to the original design philosophies, layout, construction methods and materials associated with the various phases of the building's history.

The place possesses uncommon, rare or endangered aspects of the cultural or natural history of New South Wales.

The former Sailors' Home is extremely rare as the only institution of its kind established outside Sydney and one of only two such institutions existing in NSW and possibly Australia.

The place is important in demonstrating the principal characteristics of a class of cultural or natural places/environments in New South Wales.

The buildings are representative of the Victorian Italianate style of architecture and the Sailors' Home is one of the largest and most intact examples in this area of Newcastle.
