= Newcastle Civic Theatre =

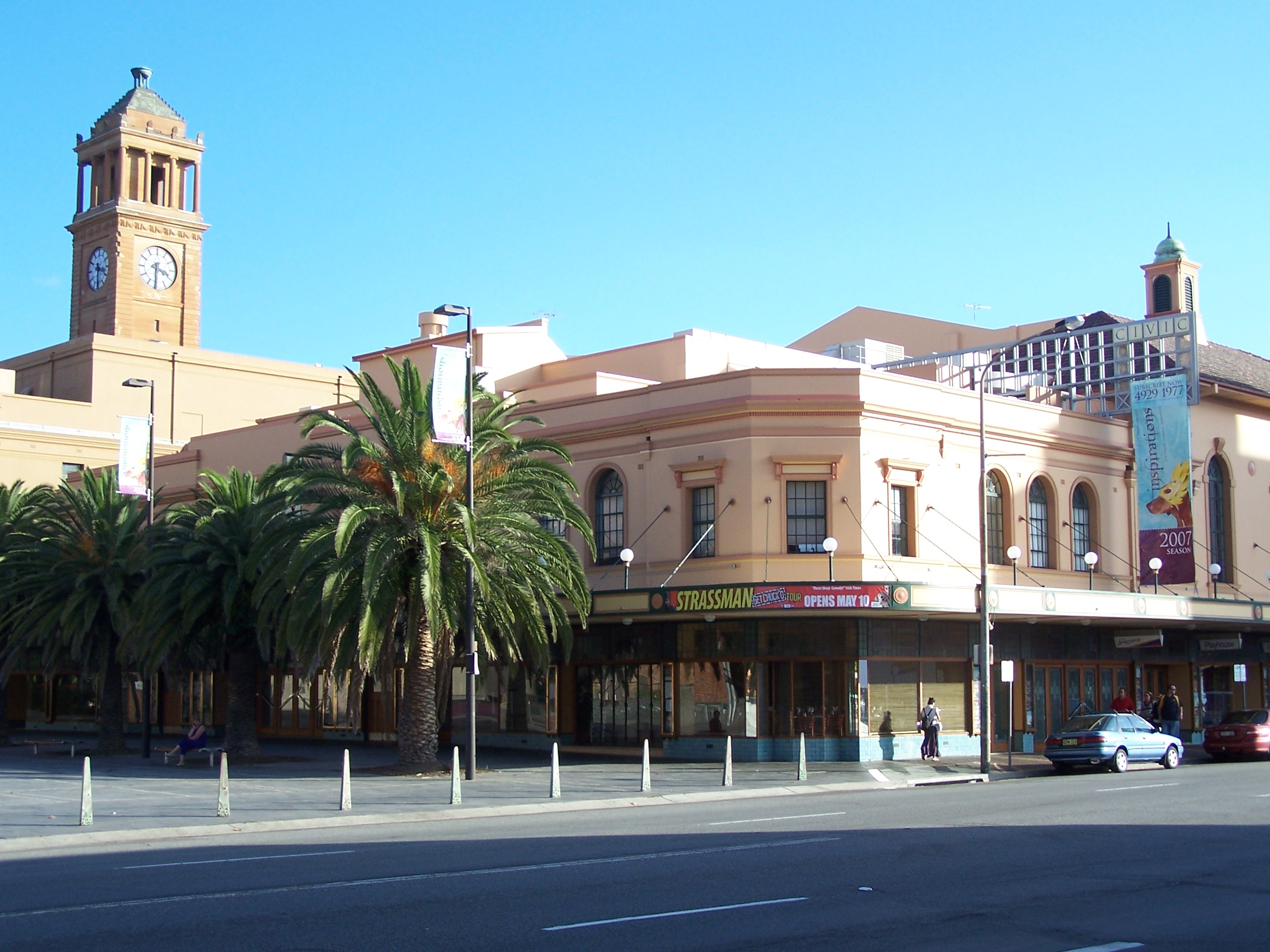
- Newcastle Civic Theatre at Wheeler Place, in 2007.
- Interactive map of the Newcastle Civic Theatre area
- Alternative names: The Civic

General information
- Type: Cinema
- Architectural style: Georgian Revival (exterior); Spanish Baroque (interior)
- Location: 373 Hunter Street, Newcastle, New South Wales, Australia
- Coordinates: 32°55′38″S 151°46′20″E
- Groundbreaking: 1927
- Opened: 1929
- Owner: City of Newcastle

Technical details
- Material: Steel, concrete, Sydney sandstone
- Floor count: Two

Design and construction
- Architect: Henry Eli White
- Developer: W Stronach

New South Wales Heritage Register
- Official name: Civic Theatre
- Designated: 27 September 2012
- Reference no.: 01883

The Newcastle Civic Theatre, also known as The Civic, is a heritage-listed building located on Hunter Street, Newcastle, Australia. Opened in 1929, the 1520-seat theatre is now the venue for a wide range of musicals, plays, concerts and dance events each year and is the city's oldest surviving theatre.

Together with the Newcastle City Hall, each site is, individually, of state heritage significance, and they are listed jointly on the New South Wales State Heritage Register as the Newcastle City Hall and Civic Theatre Precinct.

== History ==
Built under the direction of the Council of the City of Newcastle, the venue has grown to become one of Newcastle's most popular and prestigious venues. The building was opened by the Premier of New South Wales, Thomas Bavin in 1929 as a theatre but was for decades only used as a cinema. The Civic Theatre and Newcastle Town Hall were completed at the same time at a cost of £300,000. Designed by renowned theatre architect, Henry Eli White, the exterior of the building is in the Georgian Revival style, with the interior decoration in the Spanish Baroque style with a marble staircase, terrazzo balcony and chandeliers. Prior to the theatre's opening, the older Victoria Theatre on Perkins Street in the city's east end had been the premier venue for entertainment and also the city's largest and most opulent auditorium; it now stands unoccupied.

== Description ==
The Civic Theatre is a two-storey rendered brick Georgian Revival building. Its facade exhibits features of the Georgian Revival style with Italian Renaissance elements, particularly in the elegant, repetitive semi-circular-headed windows. According to the National Trust, the facade of the shop at No 14 Wheeler is the only original. Entranceways are timber framed with glass, and leadlight above. The awning is painted in heritage colours with circular motifs and pressed metal soffit.

The interior is an elaborate example of White's style in "Spanish Baroque" featuring a traditional proscenium arch, crowned with a classical frieze, a grand ornamental dome in the ceiling, with smaller domes above the back stalls and huge, recessed arches over the Royal boxes which flank the stage. Within these arches are Alamo-style parapets containing statues. The domes are indirectly lit and a "blue sky" surround flanks the stage. The auditorium walls were decorated to imitate stone castle walls. Renovations in the early 1970s enlarged the stage and orchestra pit.

The theatre was reported to be in good condition as at 3 May 2013.

== Current use ==
Designed initially as a live-theatre, The Civic was initially leased as a cinema to interests associated with Greater Union between 1929 and 1940, and then Hoyts between 1941 and 1973. From 1974, Newcastle City Council decided to move towards more live productions and phase out cinema operations completely, which was completed by 1976. With little maintenance on the building over the years, the Civic was renovated between June 1992 and November 1993 at a cost of A$10.4 million.

== Heritage listings ==
The Civic Theatre is of state significance under a number of criteria as one of the finest theatre buildings in New South Wales having been designed by prominent theatre architect Henry Eli White, architect of Sydney's State and Capitol Theatres. It is one of few surviving late-1920s atmospheric theatres in the country. The building is a finely crafted example of the Georgian Revival style, employed on a large scale. Along with the Newcastle Club and the BHP Administration Building, it represents the influence of this style in the Hunter Region. The theatre's largely intact interior is considered to be an outstanding example of the Spanish/Moroccan style. The building is also an important townscape element, being part of the civic cultural precinct, located adjacent to the City Hall (also designed by White at the same time as the City administration and council chambers) and reflects Newcastle's status as the state's second capital at the time of the theatre's construction. The theatre has operated almost continuously as an entertainment venue since 1929 and continues to be a focus of social and cultural activity, highly valued by the citizens of Newcastle for its outstanding historical, aesthetic and social significance and rarity.

The Civic Theatre, in conjunction with the Newcastle City Hall, was listed on the New South Wales State Heritage Register on 27 September 2012.
