= Newcastle City Hall (Australia) =

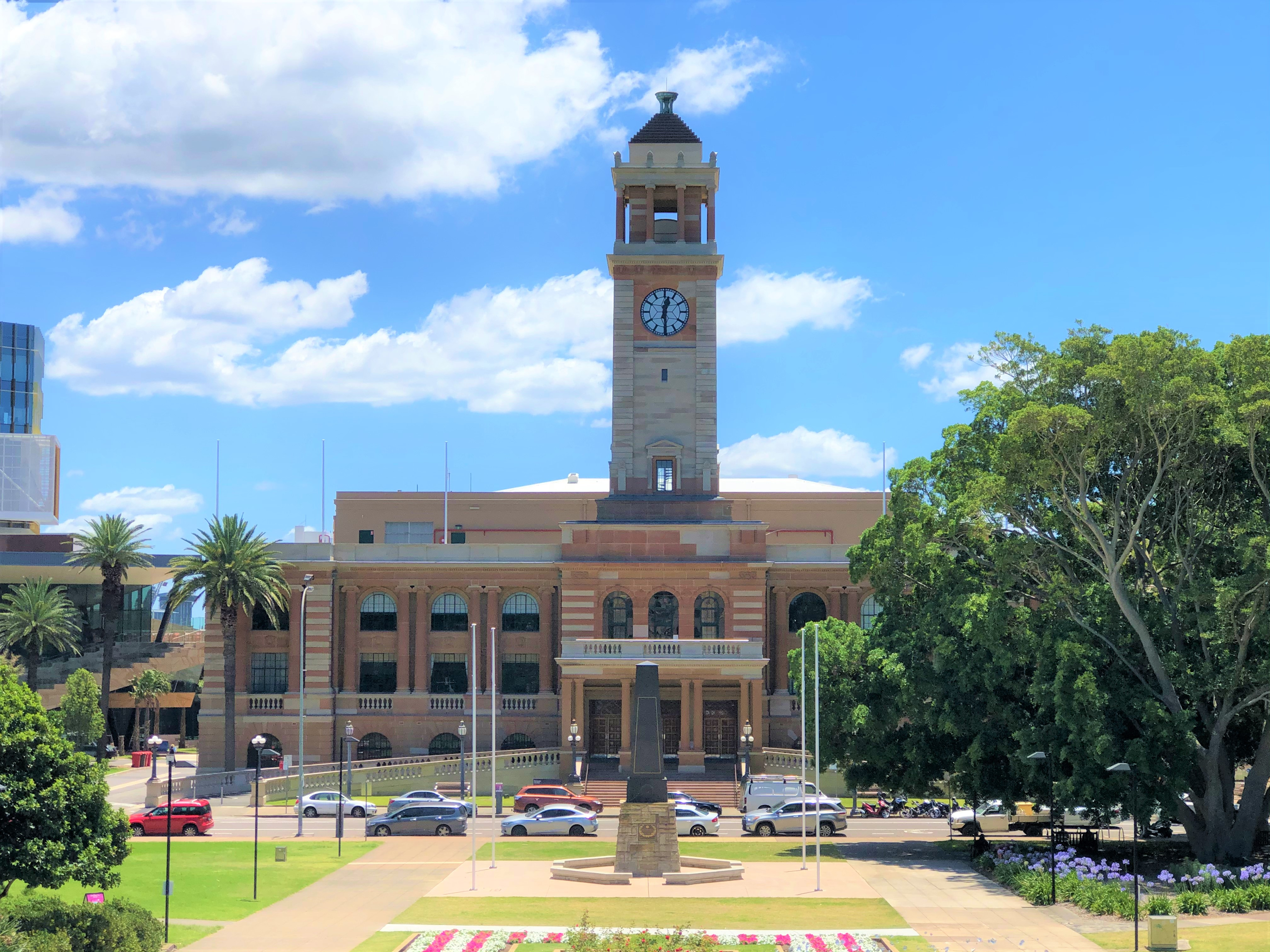
- Newcastle City Hall in 2020.
- Interactive map of the Newcastle City Hall area
- Alternative names: Newcastle Town Hall

General information
- Type: City hall
- Architectural style: Inter-War Academic Classical
- Location: 289 King Street, Newcastle, New South Wales, Australia
- Coordinates: 32°55′40″S 151°46′20″E
- Groundbreaking: 20 April 1928 (foundation stone)
- Opened: 14 December 1929
- Owner: City of Newcastle

Technical details
- Material: Steel, concrete, Sydney sandstone
- Floor count: Three

Design and construction
- Architect: Henry Eli White
- Developer: Charles Davis and Son
- Other designers: J V Rowe (interior)
- Awards: Australian Institute of Architects (1981: Best example of building recycling in NSW)

New South Wales Heritage Register
- Official name: Newcastle City Hall
- Designated: 27 September 2012
- Reference no.: 01883

The Newcastle City Hall is a heritage-listed building located in the regional New South Wales city of Newcastle in the Hunter region in Australia. The building served as the city hall for the Council of the City of Newcastle between 1929 and 1977.

The building, located at 289 King Street, was designed by noted theatre architect Henry Eli White and the foundation stone was laid by the Governor of New South Wales, Sir Dudley de Chair, on 20 April 1928. The three-storey building structure is based on a steel frame that supports concrete floors and stone cladding. Local materials were used as much as possible, including steel provided at a discount by local steelmaker, BHP. Architectural features include a clock tower, porte cochere, balustrades and stairs, all built with Sydney sandstone. The clock tower is an imposing landmark and distinctive feature of the city skyline, indicating the Civic Centre of Newcastle. The tower is a reinforced concrete and steel framed structure clad in Sydney yellowblock sandstone ashlar with rusticated quoins. Interior spaces include a ballroom, concert hall and additional function rooms.

The administrative offices of the city hall were relocated to the new Civic Administration Centre in 1977, though the council chambers remain. The clock tower suffered some damage as a result of the 1989 Newcastle earthquake, however this was subsequently repaired.

Together with the Newcastle Civic Theatre, each site is, individually, of state heritage significance, and they are listed jointly on the New South Wales State Heritage Register as the Newcastle City Hall and Civic Theatre Precinct.

== History ==
Local Government began in Newcastle in 1843 with the Newcastle District Council. This body, however, was not embraced by locals and Councillors were often appointed by the Government as no nominations had been received. When the Municipalities Act was passed in 1858, there was considerably more interest, with a large number of locals signing the petition to form the Municipality of Newcastle. Meetings of the council were initially held at the Court House on the corner of Hunter and Bolton Streets. The town's first Mayor was James Hannell. At this time the Newcastle Municipality encompassed only the central Newcastle area, with a number of the surrounding satellite communities, including Hamilton, Lambton, Waratah and others, which are now part of Newcastle Local Government Area, becoming separate municipalities over the following decades.

The meetings of Newcastle Council continued to be conducted in the Court House, and Council business was undertaken in a small room in the Borough Markets. In 1874 these two functions were brought together under one roof, in the convict built former Commissioner Store in Watt Street, which had served as Post Office until 1872. A decade later a purpose-built Council Chambers was erected on the same site in front of the Commissioner Store building, which was used as a store until demolition in 1923. It was designed by the City Engineer, John Sharp, and contained a meeting hall and offices for the Mayor and Town Clerk, on the ground floor, and further offices on the first floor.

The Council Chambers in Watt Street quickly proved to be inadequate, both in terms of space, and, it would seem, local aspirations. Only four years after it was built the first moves were made towards the construction of a Town Hall. In 1890 a design competition was held for a Town Hall and civic shopping arcade on Hunter Street. The competition was won by eminent local architect Frederick Menkens. However, the project did not proceed, partly due to Council's inability to raise the required funds. Over the following three-and-a-half decades a long series of plans failed to materialise. The need for new premises was intensified following the 1919 Local Government Act, which increased the powers of local government. The existing Council Chambers was extended, but Council staff were still scattered through four separate buildings in Watt Street due to lack of space. At the same time, Newcastle's growing population placed further pressure on the inadequate facilities for public meetings. By 1921 the population of the Newcastle area reached 84,372, an increase of 30,000 across the previous decade.

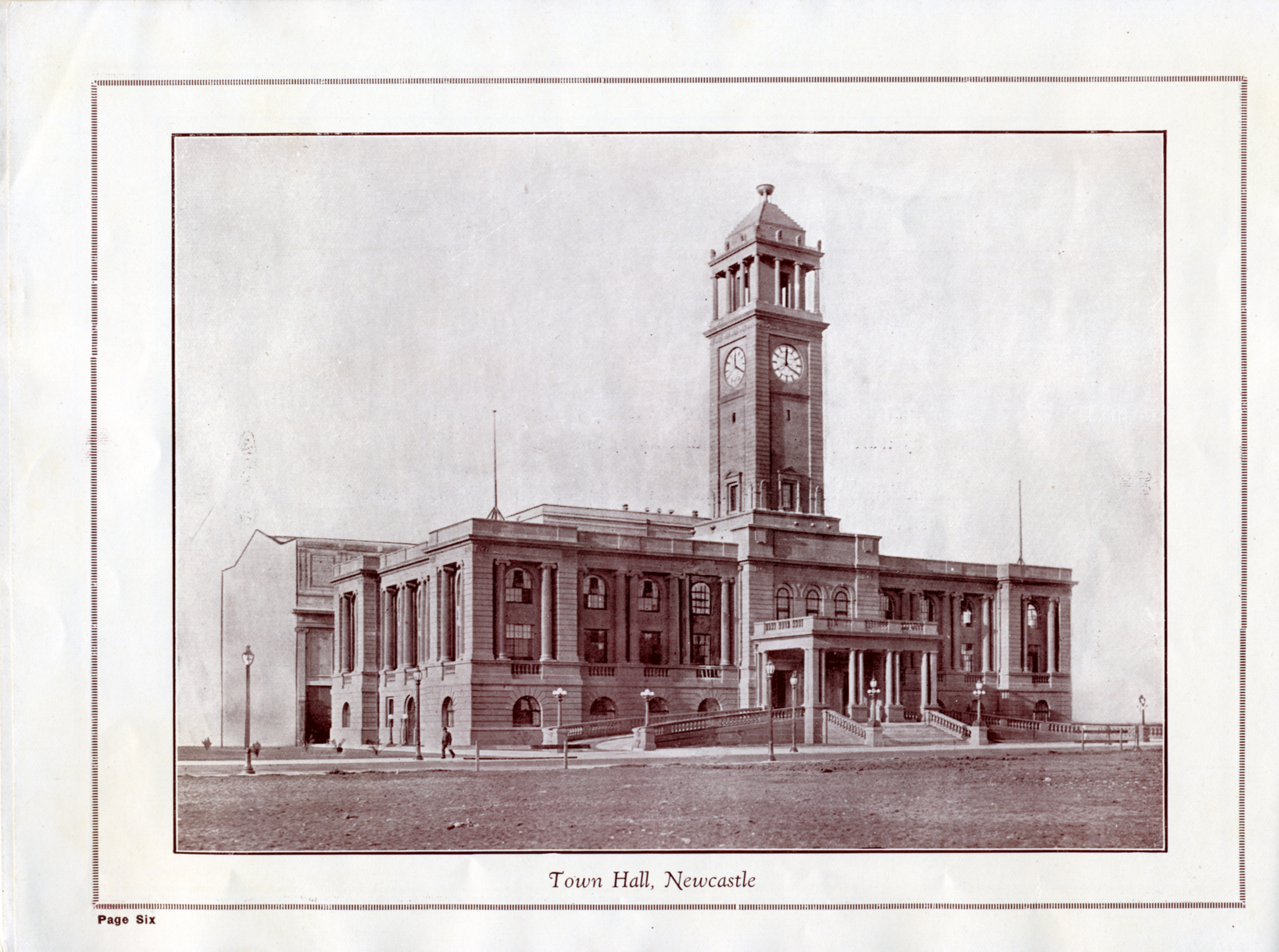
The city hall in the 1920s

In January 1920 a referendum of rate payers was held to gauge community support for raising a loan to purchase a suitable site for the construction of a Town Hall. 682 people voted and supported the move by a large majority. The next hurdle was to find a suitable site. After the acquisition of a site owned by John Brown in Hunter Street was thwarted, the community was again involved in a September referendum to decide whether the Town Hall should be constructed in the east or west end of town (either side of Burwood Street). Considerably fewer votes were cast, and an east end location was favoured by a small majority. After the decision to purchase land bound by Hunter, Darby, King and Burwood Streets for a Town Hall based on Menkens' design, yet another attempt was abandoned due to the cost of resumption and compensation of existing businesses. This issue of a Town Hall was again postponed.

The election of Morris Light as Mayor of Newcastle in 1924 was a turning point. He was a man of vision and determination who had served on Newcastle and Carrington Councils for 35 years. In February 1925 Light began the final, successful scheme to build a Town Hall for Newcastle, recognising that the city had long ago outgrown the existing Council Chambers. In June 1925 the report produced by the specially appointed Town Hall Special Committee for the construction of a Town Hall, theatre and business premises on the present, central site was adopted. The appointment of Mr Henry Eli White as architect and the taking of a 175,000-pound loan were approved. Although Light died before the completion of the project, he is widely recognised as the man who made it happen, a pair of memorial light standards at the main entrance to the Town Hall commemorates his contribution.

It was after lengthy debate that Council commissioned Henry Eli White for the design. Council was anxious to engage an architect with experience in theatre design. White had developed a passion for theatre design in 1907, and his 3 essentials were vision lines, acoustics and ventilation. The reputation that drew White to the attention of Council aldermen was firmly established by 1915. He was one of the most successful theatre architects in the country, having designed or redesigned a number of theatres in New Zealand and Australia by the mid 1920s, such as the Tivoli Brisbane and the Theatre Royal, Sydney. Although his main focus was on theatres White had also designed a variety of other prominent commercial and industrial buildings including the Bunnerong Powerhouse, a contract won in 1925. In August 1925 White submitted the Town Hall plans which were placed on public display in the Hunter Street window of Scott's Store. Plans for the Theatre and shops were presented soon after.

In 1926 there was community debate over the inclusion of a large theatre in the commission. One of the more vocal opponents was the manager of the Victoria Theatre. Through the local press, an unceasing opposition campaign was conducted against the construction of a new theatre in Newcastle. Consequently, a poll of ratepayers occurred in 1926 at which voters were asked to indicate their preference for a town hall, theatre and shops or a town hall only. A majority were in support of the proposal to include the theatre in the design and a successful application under the Local Government Act to raise two hundred thousand pounds led to the resumption of land.

The design of the town hall and theatre/shops complex was let as a single contract, but separate tenders were called for the construction of the two buildings. The successful tenderer was the firm of Charles Davis and Son, which submitted the lowest tender of 82,927 pounds. Among the firm's larger contracts were the AMP block, remodelling of the council's market street buildings, the Commercial Bank, and several hotels including the Crown and Anchor. His domestic work included Braeside at Waratah, designed by Frederick Menkens.

In July 1927, the Council resumed just over 2 acres of land for the civic complex, including a site owned by John Brown. Included in the resumption were 10 lots in Section A of the original 2000-acre grant to the Australian Agricultural Company. Newcastle City Hall still stands on Lots 10, 11, and 12 of these portions, while Christie Place occupies Lots 13 and 14 with Wheeler Place occupying lot 9. The firm of Archibald Rodgers previously occupied the site. The firm was established in Carrington in 1854. In 1870 the name was changed to Rodgers Bros. and the business moved to King Street on which City Hall now stands. The land was swampy and required six feet of fill to prepare it for the new engineering works including a blacksmiths' shop, fitting and machine shop and a moulding shop. Following resumption by Council in 1927, the buildings were auctioned or demolished. Part of the site now containing Nesca House was retained by Rodgers Bros. This land was resumed in 1936 for the construction of Nesca House.

In November 1927, Council decided to change the external cladding material from brick and cement to freestone. This was first noted in the Council minutes in November 1927. Within three weeks the decision had been made, and the building was to be faced with 30,000 super feet of stone from Waverley in Sydney, increasing the cost of the project by 26,480 pounds. The work was suspended until government approval was granted for an additional loan of 81,000 pounds to cover the cost of the stone and increased land acquisition costs. The loan was finally repaid in 1960. Given the history of community consultation on significant issues relating to the Town Hall proposal, it can only be assumed that Council did not invite further delay of the project at this stage. There is no evidence of opposition from the community.

Pouring the foundations of Cockle Creek concrete reinforced with BHP steel began on 7 March 1928. Seven tons of steel were used in one area at the base of the tower. Existing overhead high-tension mains in the vicinity of the site were put underground to allow an unimpeded view of the Town Hall, and a substation constructed to the west of the building. The foundation stone was laid on 20 April 1928, by the Governor Sir Dudley de Chair, who travelled by train to Newcastle. He described the people of Newcastle as industrious and enterprising and declared the Town Hall "one of the noblest structures of the kind which has been erected in the State". He then laid the foundation stone of polished trachyte.

As a general policy in construction of the Town hall, the Council preferred to use local materials, suppliers and contractors. British steel had been specified but steps were taken to substitute BHP steel. BHP steel was more expensive than the specified imported product, and Council approached the BHP to bear half the costs of the steel, which they accepted, reducing the cost of the steel by 250 pounds.

Although the council had agreed that the Town Clerk be responsible for the interior design, it was later decided that the professional advice should be sought. J. V. Rowe, recognised furnishing expert, was engaged to undertake the interior decoration. Rowe had come to Australia in 1904 as chief designer for Wunderlich. He is credited with introducing Art Nouveau to Wunderlich. He continued to work for the firm until 1925. He was Principal of the East Sydney Technical College. Previous commissions include the Royal Automobile Club in Sydney, Rose Bay Golf Club and private homes in Sydney.

On 14 December 1929, the Governor Sir Dudley de Chair returned to Newcastle to open the town hall. The adjacent Civic Theatre was opened by the Premier, Thomas Bavin. To mark the opening, Council declared "Civic Week", a week of celebrations.

The clock was initially to be a gift to the city but the cost of 850 pounds was borne by the council. At the time the clock was seen as a worthy rival to London's Big Ben. The clock and bell were supplied by Prouds, together with 15 small electric clocks which were synchronised with the father clock.

Morris Light's concept was for a town hall and offices together with an art gallery and museum. This was later modified to encompass the Civic Theatre including an exhibition hall and 14 shops, public open spaces (Christie Place and Civic Park) and new roads (Wheeler Place and Christie Street). The construction of the city hall and the Civic Theatre was the catalyst for the transformation of this part of the city centre. White was instrumental in having the buildings in Civic Park removed and the land resumed as park. In 1949 a precinct plan was prepared by the Northumberland County Council which established a site for the War memorial cultural centre (Newcastle Region Library) at the southern end of the axis established by City Hall. This is a similar planning model to Parliament House in Canberra and the National War Memorial. This generous vision for the civic precinct which forms the centre of today's Newcastle, and the lavish construction of the Town Hall and adjacent Civic Theatre was made possible by the optimism and booming economy of the early-mid 1920s. The use of a classical style for the Town Hall is reflective of a persistent belief in the western world that the true architecture "had its roots in Greece, Rome and the Renaiisance and that some form of classicism was the only safe port in a stormy sea of change" that was the early twentieth century.

In 1937 the 11 borough councils in Newcastle were amalgamated to form the City of Newcastle and the Town Hall became the legislative and administrative hub from this time. The name was changed to City Hall in honour of this event.

During the war years City Hall formed an important hub for charitable and patriotic organisations as community activities of this nature burgeoned, and also hosted recruitment rallies, patriotic fundraising concerts, returned soldiers events. A request by the Anti-Conscription Committee to hold a meeting in the City Hall, on the other hand, was denied by the mayor, to the chagrin of the Trades Hall Council. The alliance between the British Empire, Soviet Union and United States was marked by the hoisting of the Red Flag on the City Hall in October 1941, and additional flagpoles were erected on the building to allow the Union Jack, the American, Soviet and Greek flags to be raised daily. The National Emergency Services organisation was moved into the No. 1 Committee Room in the City Hall in March 1941, and in January 1942, as the war seemed to draw perilously close to NSW, the main door of the City Hall was bricked up as a protection against potential blasts.

Through the 1930s and 1940s settlement and damp issues were addressed. Several alterations were made to the stage in the main auditorium during the 1940s and 1950s, the provision of improved lighting and a larger stage area to allow ballet and orchestral performances. This was necessary because the Civic Theatre had become such a popular, and profitable, venue for movies that such performances had been squeezed out. By the late 1950s and 1960s the City Hall was becoming crowded and the City Engineer, Aldermen and the public jostled for space. Both public and staff facilities were seen as shabby and inadequate. Writing to the Newcastle Morning Herald on 4 May 1966 "Hostess" captured the concerns of the public for their city's reputation, writing "Most visitors to Newcastle go to the City Hall which is in a sense our "lounge room" so how about a brighter welcome?" The pressure was finally relieved with the construction of the Civic Administration Centre in 1977, and the relocation of all administrative functions out of the City Hall.

The City Hall itself was to remain the focus of civic life, and after half a century of only minor maintenance work, needed a thorough going over. Local architects Suters and Busteed and local builder R W Black were engaged to carry out refurbishment works aiming to incorporate new services, such as air conditioning, and converting previous office space into public spaces, at the same time as maintaining and enhancing the dignity of the original design. In 1981 these works received an award from the Royal Australian Institute of Architects as one of the best examples of building recycling in NSW. The City Hall was largely spared by the 1989 earthquake, but some repairs to the tower were necessary. After 2001 major stonework conservation was undertaken

The City Hall continues to house Council Chambers, as well as hosting civic receptions, community gatherings, weddings, national and international conferences, trade shows, seminars, corporate meetings, product launches and social functions.

== Description ==
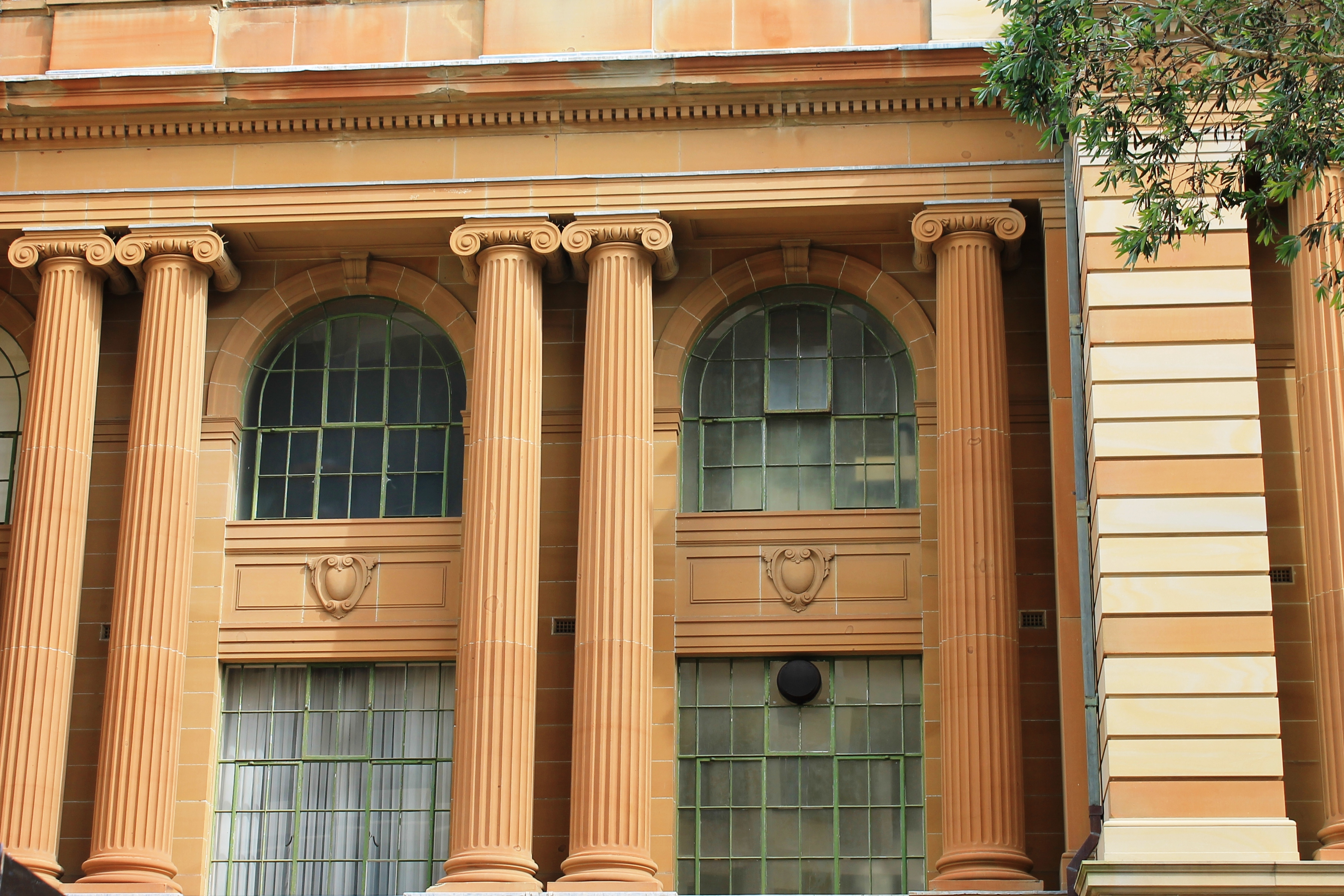
Neo-classical columns

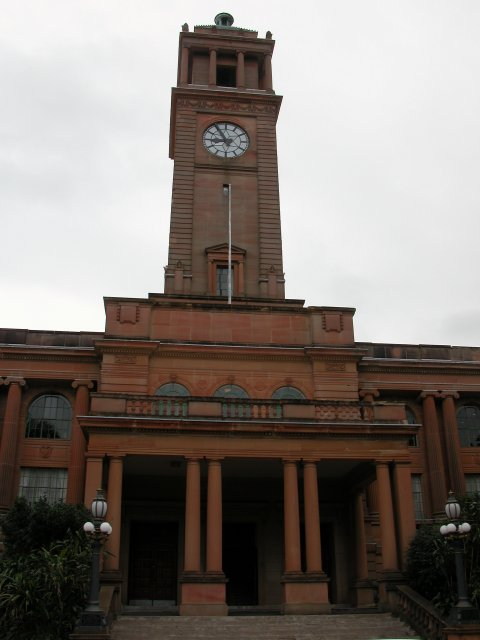
Clock tower

Newcastle City Hall is a three storey stone-clad building in the Inter-War Academic Classical style. It is supported by a steel frame and reinforced concrete floors. Like the similar Brisbane Town Hall, its design follows the precedent established in the nineteenth century, where the strong vertical mass of a central tower emerges from a relatively low base over three storeys. The building features imposing symmetrical pavilions with coupled Roman Doric and Ionic orders on the three mains facades, which are designed to be seen "in-the-round". On the southern, King Street, facade a Porte Cochere is supported by sandstone Roman Doric style columns, the balustrade above the entablature has circular turned balusters. The balusters are slim and have been largely replaced by synthetic stone balusters.

The upper two storeys of the major facades are treated as a single storey united by Ionic columns. The ground floor is treated as a rusticated plinth. This device prevents the classical detailing on the building looking distorted. The rear elevation, backing onto Christie Lane, is painted cement render. A deep continuous base course is broken by two original escape doors and a new escape door introduced in 1980. Sandstone quoins return on both ends, three moulded string courses and a cornice being the only features. Blind windows are then used to excellent effect.

The external wall cladding and elements such as the Porte Cochere, the clock tower, balconies, balustrades and external stairs are built of Sydney "yellowblock" sandstone. Externally, metal grilles, window and door frames are used.

A vehicular ramp leads up to the main entrance midway between the ground and first floor levels. The entrance is then enclosed in the Porte-Cochere. The flat roof of the Porte-Cochere provides a terrace off the main staircase midway between first and second floors. This ingenious planning device clearly defines an imposing entrance and again helps break the height and bulk of the building. The scale is further reduced by means of a flight of steps from King Street.

The clock tower is an imposing landmark and distinctive feature of the city skyline, indicating the Civic Centre of Newcastle. The tower is a reinforced concrete and steel framed structure clad in Sydney yellowblock sandstone ashlar with rusticated quoins.

The City Hall was reported to be in good physical condition as of 3 May 2013.

== Current use ==
The concert hall, stage and upper gallery is frequently used by a wide range of community and commercial groups as a platform for staging choirs, orchestras, plays or other musical performances. Additional function rooms cater for civic receptions, community gatherings, weddings, national and international conferences, trade shows, seminars, corporate meetings, product launches and social functions.

== Heritage listing ==
Newcastle City Hall is of historic and aesthetic significance to the State of NSW as an imposing civic building embodying the civic pride of NSW's second city in a restrained inter-war classicism. City Hall is an outstanding example of the Inter-War Academic Classical style in NSW. The building's planning, construction and history of use demonstrates the evolution of local government in Newcastle, reflecting the growth, development and increased power of local government across the twentieth century in New South Wales. The style of the building is illustrative of significant social and aesthetic values of the inter-war period in NSW, demonstrating a desire to hold onto traditional forms of architectural stylism particularly in public architecture, in the face of modernism and social and political change. Locally, the architectural pretensions and central Newcastle site demonstrates the perceived centrality of local government to the City of Newcastle during the interwar years, and ambition of mayors and civic leaders to leave their mark on the city by transforming this previously industrial area into a unique cultural precinct to form the civic heart of the city. City Hall has strong associations with its designer Henry Eli White, an internationally noted theatre architect of the early twentieth century, and JV Rowe, principal designer for the Wunderlich company from 1904 to 1925, responsible for the original interior finishes and decoration. Locally the City Hall has a significant association with Alderman Morris Light (1859–1929), Mayor and businessman, the realisation of the City Hall and Civic Theatre complex being his greatest achievement. The building is also associated with Alderman Joy Cummings, who was the first female Lord Mayor in Australia.

Newcastle City Hall was listed on the New South Wales State Heritage Register on 27 September 2012.
