= Convict Lumber Yard =

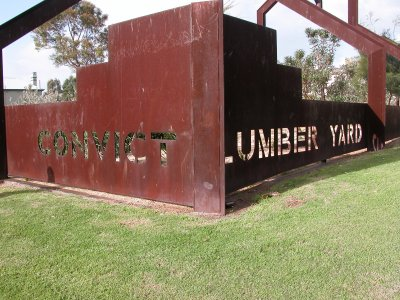

- Location within New South Wales Location within Australia
- 32.9269°S 151.7859°E
- Location: 98 Scott Street, Newcastle, New South Wales, Australia

History
- Built: 1801–1930

Site notes
- Architect: Multiple
- Owner: Foreshore Pty Ltd; Newcastle City Council; Royal Newcastle Hospital

New South Wales Heritage Register
- Official name: Convict Lumber Yard or Stockade Site; Stationmaster's residence and Paymaster's office; Convict Lumberyard; Stockade
- Type: state heritage (archaeological-terrestrial)
- Designated: 2 April 1999
- Reference no.: 570
- Type: Yarding/ Loading Facility
- Category: Manufacturing and Processing
- Builders: Multiple

Convict Lumber Yard is a heritage-listed site at 98 Scott Street, Newcastle, New South Wales, Australia. Largely an archaeological site, it has been the location of a convict lumber yard, convict stockade and a series of shipping and railway-related buildings. The former station master's residence and paymaster's office survive intact alongside archaeological remains of the site's various other usages. It was added to the New South Wales State Heritage Register on 2 April 1999.

== Timeline ==
- 1801 – First convict settlement at Newcastle, on this site. Beginning of Lumber Yard operations.
- 1822 – Newcastle closed as a penal settlement. Site ceases to be used for convict internment, but lumber operations continue.
- 1831 – Lumber Yard closed down.
- 1832 – Lumber Yard reopened as a base for convicts building Nobby's breakwater. Known as 'The Stockade'
- 1840 – Transportation of convicts to NSW ceases.
- 1846 – Nobby's Breakwater is completed and convict occupation is phased out.
- 1857 – Great Northern Railway opened.
- 1858 – Goods yard brought into use at Circular Wharf.
- 1876 – Newcastle Customs House constructed.
- 1879 – Berthing master's house constructed (now known as the Paymaster's office).
- 1885 – Traffic manager's residence (later called the station master's residence) and Stationmaster's residence constructed.
- 1887 – Additions to the Traffic manager's residence.
- 1892 – Bretts sail loft erected
- 1904 – Berthing master's Office converted to Booking Office, first floor probably added at this time.
- 1900–1930s – Two cottages erected on site for railway employees, various other buildings for the Railway Institute, including a hall in Scott Street alongside the Station master's residence, and a tennis court which occupied the site of the cottage nearest Scott Street.
- 1939 – Bretts sail loft demolished.
- 1940 – Booking Office now used as Paymaster's Office.
- 1947 – Railways and Tramways Institute opened new premises in Newcastle West .
- 1967 – Railway Institute Hall demolished.
- 1968 – Station Master's residence vacated.
- 1987 – Enterprise Park opened. First Archaeological excavation unearths remains of well, forge and brick paving.

Further archaeological investigations were carried out in June 1989 and October 1992.

== Description ==
Evidence of an Aboriginal open campsite mainly comprising stone tools was located on the site during the 1987 archaeological excavations.

Physical evidence of the convict occupation of the site also found during these excavations includes: a brick drain and stone sump; a kiln floor; a well; parts of the brick convict barrack (c. 1818); bricks from the collapsed convict hospital and various brick pathways.

Physical evidence of the railways occupation period is far more substantial with some of the structures remaining. These include: the large and imposing station master's residence; the two storey Paymaster's Office; the concrete slab remains from Brett's sailmakers' loft and some brick remains of the Railway Institute Hall.

The site has very high archaeological potential. The extant buildings are in good condition.

== Heritage listing ==
The Convict Lumber Yard site, including the Station Master's residence and Paymaster's office, is of outstanding heritage significance for the following reasons:

- Its rare evidence of a convict industrial workplace and of convict structures thought to have been lost;
- Its potential to reveal, through archaeological excavation, further evidence of convict occupation and the later history of the site;
- Its evidence of the major themes of Newcastle's history, particularly convict history and railway and port history;
- Its contribution to the townscape of Newcastle and Newcastle East;
- Its potential to interpret Newcastle's history and for its association with its community;
- Its evidence of Aboriginal occupation which is now rare in the urban Newcastle area.

Convict Lumber Yard was listed on the New South Wales State Heritage Register on 2 April 1999 having satisfied the following criteria.

The place is important in demonstrating the course, or pattern, of cultural or natural history in New South Wales.

The site is significant for:

- Its major evidence of the convict period of Newcastle's history, when Newcastle was the place for secondary punishment of convicts.
- Its evidence of a convict workplace and possibly the oldest physical evidence of an industrial workplace in Australia.
- Its evidence of the role of NSW Railways in the development of Newcastle and its port.
- Its evidence, in the stationmaster's residence, of the practice of government instrumentalities of providing accommodation for its employees.
- Its evidence of operation of the NSW Railways as an institution, particularly in relation to payments of employees and its care of buildings.

The place is important in demonstrating aesthetic characteristics and/or a high degree of creative or technical achievement in New South Wales.

The site is significant for:

- Its aesthetic accomplishment as evidenced in the design and form of the Stationmaster's residence, which is a good example of a late Victorian residence.
- The contribution the extant buildings make to the townscape, much of which comprises buildings connected with the railways of the past.
- The view which it provides of the harbour and the foreshore, both from within the site and from Parnell Street.

The place has strong or special association with a particular community or cultural group in New South Wales for social, cultural or spiritual reasons.

The site is significant for:

- The association of the site with the Newcastle Community, particularly through its involvement in and support for the archaeological excavation and for the conservation of the site.
- The potential of the site, combined with documentary and oral evidence, to interpret major aspects of the history of Newcastle from convict settlement to the present.

The place has potential to yield information that will contribute to an understanding of the cultural or natural history of New South Wales.

The site is significant for:

- Its evidence of the technical accomplishment of convict buildings in early 19th century Newcastle.
- Its potential to yield information, not available through documentary sources, about the convict occupation of the site.
- Its potential to yield information about uses of the site after the closure of the convict stockade.
- Its evidence of Aboriginal occupation which is now rare in the urban Newcastle area.

The place possesses uncommon, rare or endangered aspects of the cultural or natural history of New South Wales.

This site provides: rare evidence of a convict stockade/convict workplace; rare evidence of an early industrial site and physical evidence (now becoming uncommon) of payment practices of large organisations.

The place is important in demonstrating the principal characteristics of a class of cultural or natural places/environments in New South Wales.

The Stationmaster's residence is representative of the standard of design and accommodation provided for important employees in the NSW railways in the 1870s and 1880s.
