= Newcastle Customs House =

Heritage listed building in Newcastle in New South Wales, Australia

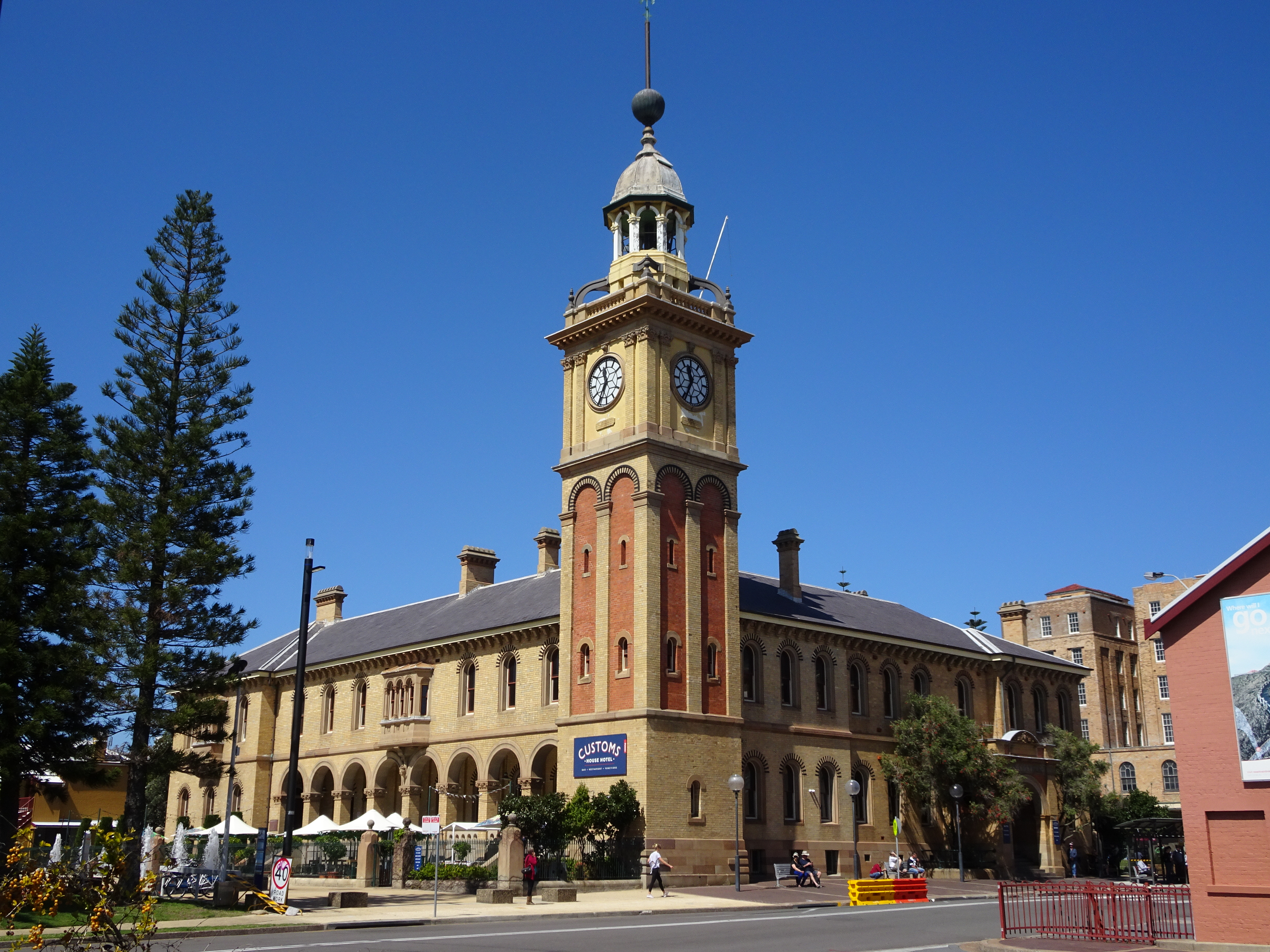
- Interactive map of the Newcastle Customs House area
- Alternative names: Customs House

General information
- Type: Custom house; repurposed as a hotel
- Architectural style: Italianate Renaissance Revival
- Location: Corner of Bond and Watt Street, Newcastle, New South Wales, Australia
- Coordinates: 32°55′36″S 151°47′6″E
- Completed: 1877, 1899
- Owner: Fernance Family Holdings

Height
- Tip: 32-metre-high (105 ft) clock tower, lantern and time ball

Technical details
- Material: Predominately brick
- Floor count: Two, plus basement

Design and construction
- Architects: James Barnet; Walter Liberty Vernon
- Architecture firm: New South Wales Colonial Architect
- Developer: Jennings and Pallister

New South Wales Heritage Register
- Official name: Newcastle Customs House
- Designated: 14 July 2000
- Reference no.: 01403

The Newcastle Customs House, also known as the Customs House Hotel, is a heritage-listed building designed by James Barnet located at the corner of Bond Street and Watt Street in Newcastle, New South Wales. Built in the Italianate Renaissance Revival style popular at the time, the building suffered damage during the 1989 Newcastle earthquake and reopened as a hotel in 1995.

== History ==
In the late 1820s, free traders operated from Newcastle Harbour. During this time, customs officers were housed in temporary buildings, which were deemed insufficient. Consequently, a plan for a new customs building was created, and a contract was signed in 1871. The construction, however, did not progress beyond the planning phase.

A plan for a new building, proposed by architect James Barnet, was accepted by the government in July 1874. Construction began in October of that year, after the site was fenced off, with a budget of £13,200. The final stone was laid in 1876, but the building was not completed until April 1877 and remained unoccupied until November of that year. A copper-plated time ball was also installed in 1877 to replace a nearby weaker time ball, which was first dropped at 1pm in January 1888 and continued in operation until wear and improved timekeeping methods led to its retirement November 1941. The time ball was restored in 1988 and continues to operate as of 2024.

In 1897, under the direction of Walter Liberty Vernon, an additional wing was added to the building and was completed by the start of 1900. In 1924, the clock was recommissioned, and in 1956, a major refurbishment was carried out. In January 1959, a fire caused severe damage to the roof and two floors of the building, with damages estimated at £13,000.

In the 1960s, the building was repainted and underwent several interior and exterior renovations, which was later found by National Trust of Australia (NSW) to have damaged the integrity of the stonework. In 1971, attempts were made to renovate the brickwork and stonework, but was reported in 1979 to have "failed in almost all areas of application." Restoration work in the 1980s repaired the stone and brickwork and restored the original interior design of the building.

During the 1989 Newcastle earthquake, the Customs House suffered considerable damage. $4 million was allocated for remediation works, and between 1990 and 1994, the building underwent major renovations using reinforced concrete and steel to help it withstand seismic events.

The Customs House reopened in 1995 as a hotel after more than a century of serving as a government office. In 2018, the building became known as the Customs House Hotel, with a restaurant and bar on the lower level and a function room on the upper level.

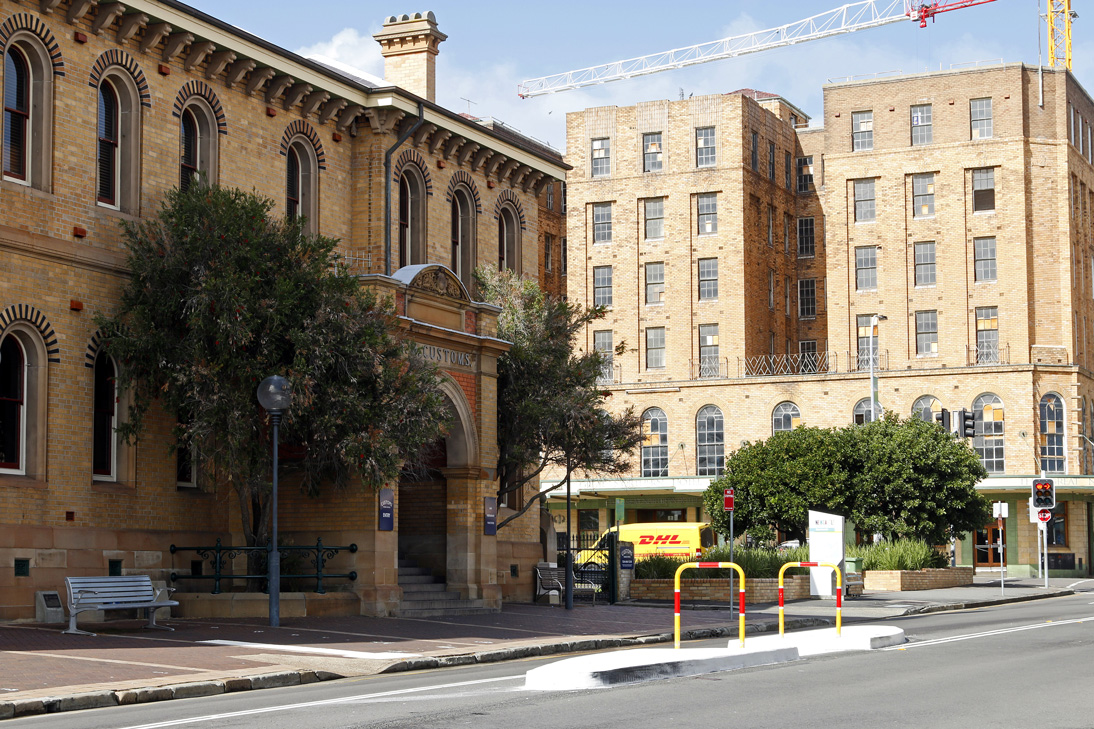
Customs House, Watt Street, Newcastle, NSW, looking towards the Great Northern Hotel

== Description ==
Designed in the Italianate Renaissance Revival style and built in two major phases, the building was planned along an elongated east-west axis, with a 32-metre high (105 ft) tower at the western end, and a slightly projected bay at the eastern end with a basement area underneath.

The exterior of the building features cream brickwork, a sandstone plinth, and projecting eaves brackets. Along the primary facades, there are semi-circular arched windows with carved stone reveals and arches made of alternating cream and black fire bricks, while the courtyard-facing windows have simple brick reveals, sandstone arches and stone windowsills.

No major changes have been made to the layout of the interior since the building was completed, with many of the original stairs, timber floorboards, doors and fireplaces remaining in their original positions. Since the 1980s, restoration works on the interior have largely restored the original colour scheme, doors, and handrails, as well as details such as architraves and ceiling roses.

The physical condition of the building was reported as good as at 24 July 2000.

== Heritage listing ==
Listed on the New South Wales State Heritage Register, the building's architectural excellence and historical significance in relation to Newcastle's maritime and commercial history are recognized.

The following are selected quotes from that listing:

"The visual relationship to the harbor and the city is significant and symbolizes the associational relationship of the Customs House to the maritime and commercial history of Newcastle".

"The architectural excellence of Barnet's original 1877 building, including external fabric and details, is largely intact. The 1899 wing was added sensitively by adopting almost identical materials and details".
