= Victoria Theatre (Newcastle) =

Theatre in Newcastle, Australia

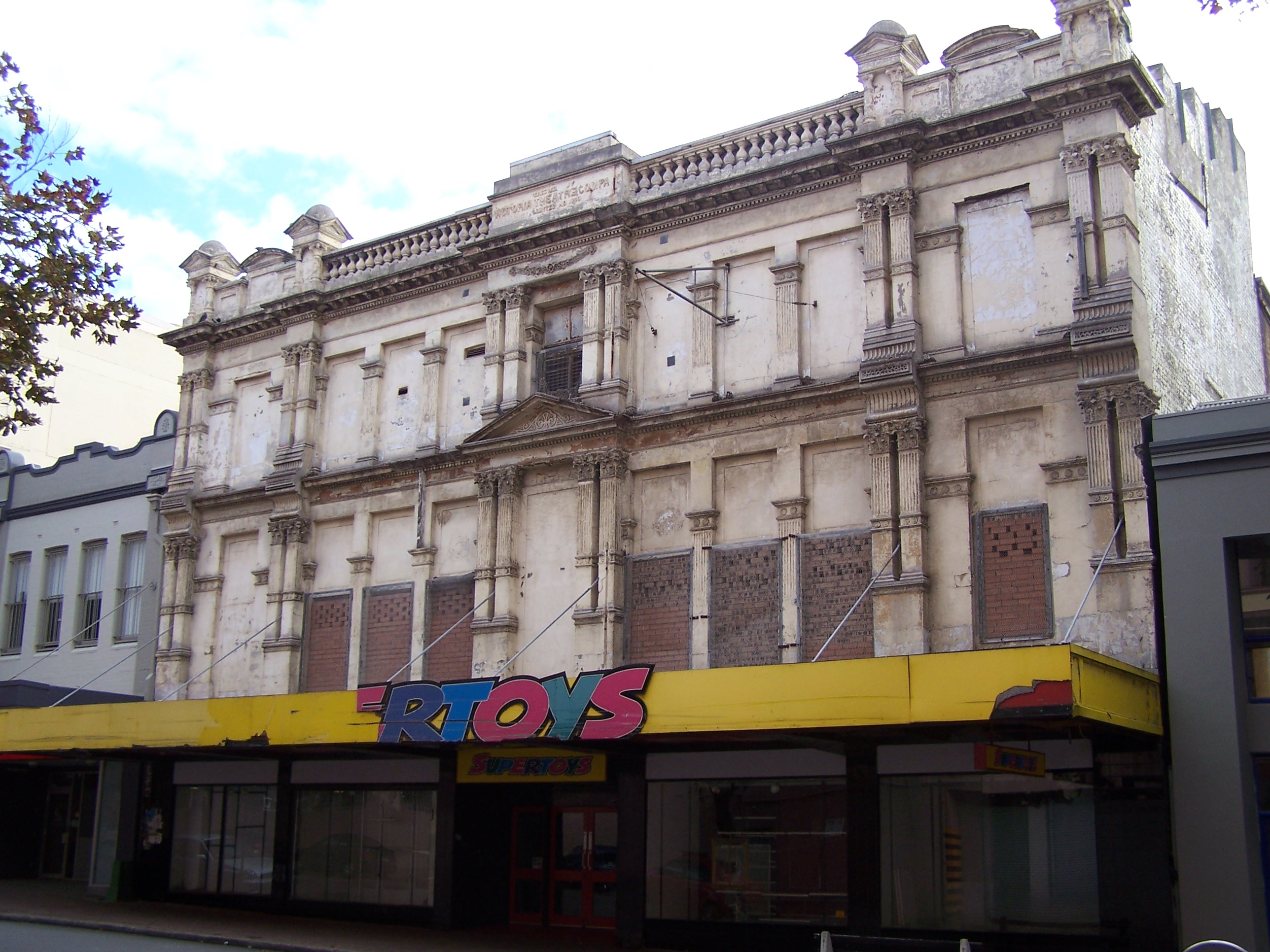
- Victoria Theatre, 2007
- Interactive map of Victoria Theatre
- Address: 8–10 Perkins Street; Newcastle; Australia
- Coordinates: 32.92866°S 151.77752°E
- Type: Dual purpose theatre/cinema
- Designation: Historic building
- Current use: Vacant

Construction
- Opened: 1876
- Closed: 1966 (as theatre)
- Rebuilt: 1890/91, 1921
- Years active: 1876–1966 as theatre 1921–1966 as theatre/cinema 1966–1997 Retail space
- Architect: J. Henderson

The Victoria Theatre is a heritage-listed former theatre at 8–10 Perkins Street, Newcastle, City of Newcastle, New South Wales, Australia. It was opened in 1876 and rebuilt during 1890–1891, and is the oldest theatre still standing in New South Wales. It was added to the New South Wales State Heritage Register on 27 August 1999.

The Victoria is only one of several large 'stage and screen' theatres built across the city from the 1870s until the early twentieth-century that have since been closed down. Others of importance were the early Central Mission Theatre on King Street, the Civic Theatre, and the Theatre Royal both on Hunter Street.

== History ==
The first Victoria Theatre was built on the site in 1876. This was altered in 1885 and razed in 1890. The third Victoria Theatre was built in 1890 and closed as a cinema in 1966.

Early performances at the theatre included Deglorian Acrobats (1880) and the Montague-Turner Opera Company (1881), the latter performing Lucia di Lammermoor, Il trovatore and Faust.

In 1886, a company of prominent men including the mayors of both Newcastle (Mr J. Creer) and Maitland met in Newcastle and agreed to buy the theatre.

The theatre was extensively rebuilt in 1890. The architect in charge of the 1890 rebuilding was Mr. James Henderson, who elaborately furnished the three level auditorium in neo-Grecian theme. A large stage house and a small first class hotel were also incorporated in the second theatre that could seat 1,700 people. The stalls were steeply sloped and the dress circle could accommodate 500 people. It was fitted with American-style folding seats. The stage was 13.7 m (45 ft) wide, 11.6 m (38 ft) deep and 16.8 m (55 ft) high.

The Fletcher Memorial concerts were held in 1893, raising funds for a statue of the late James Fletcher MLA with Alexander Brown, MLC opening the concerts.

In May 1897 there was the Grand Concert Governor's Reception under the immediate patronage of Lord Hampden and Lady Hampden and the Mayor and Mayoress of Sydney and Newcastle. May/June saw the Flying Jordons American Vaudeville Athletes and Entertainers and also Ireland revisited. On several full moon nights in June the city/region celebrated Queen Victoria's record reign. The exterior of the theatre was brilliantly illuminated and a transparency of the queen was exhibited on the front of the theatre while 4th Regiment band played a number of selections in Perkins Street. National Anthem was sung, Mr C. Hannell performed Hamlet and Othello in aid of Newcastle Hospital, Lime light views of 'A day's holiday at Windsor' - life like views of the queen and the royal family by G. Hall and T. Simon, concluding with fireworks. July saw Ada Delroy Company with Cobra Di Capello Dance and the Lumeire Cinematographe. During September the City celebrated the Centennial of Lieutenant John Shortland's Discovery of Newcastle and Alfred Dampier's Company presented his plays including: Robbery Under Arms, Monte Cristo, East Lynne etc. October saw Professor D M Bristo, who had his performing Horses, Ponies and Mules on stage.

The theatre's facilities were upgraded in 1905 by architect Mr. E. A. Scott of Sydney with Government approval, the auditorium was redecorated and extra dressing rooms were built which allow the stage to be widened.

A number of Australian melodramas were staged at the theatre, including Thunderbolt (1906), The Squatter's Daughter (1909), For The Term of His Natural Life (1909), On Our Selection (1913) and Seven Little Australians (1920).

The Great Glove Contest Boxing between legendary Les Darcy and Bob Whitelaw was held on Eight Hour Day morning, November 1913. After 20 hard rounds, Whitelaw was awarded the decision. Lilly Lantry had her first appearance in Newcastle in 1913.

Another show for charity, Romeo and Juliet, with Miss Essie Jenyns alias Mrs J. R. Wood and Mr Malcolm McEachern of Madam Melba Concert Company with funds in aid of Newcastle Hospital in 1914. Madam Schell's bewildering Lions also appeared in 1914.

Subsequent changes to the liquor laws meant that the theatre could no longer contain a hotel, so 1921 there were extensive renovations to convert the theatre into dual stage and screen use.

Late 1921 saw a major internal refurbishment costing 20,000 pounds, removing the upper balcony and small hotel, rebuilding the dress circle and making it more suitable for use as a cinema. The auditorium was redecorated by artist Norman Carter with painted Grecian murals of dancing nymphs.

Architects for the refurbishment were Robertson and Marks who later designed the late ornate Prince Edward Theatre and the Bondi Beach Pavilion and builders were James Porter and Sons later builders for the Sydney Capitol, Regent and Melbourne's grand Regent theatres. Will Herbert became the General Manager for northern district.

In early 1922, the Victoria was taken over by Sir Benjamin and John Fuller of Melbourne's Princess Theatre fame and they built the large late Sydney St. James Theatre and added the Newcastle Victoria to their national live theatre chain. It was in the Victoria Theatre that the Hunter Region was introduced to theatre companies such as J. C. Williamsons, Fuller's and the Elizabethan Theatre Trust. Sir Harry Lauder visited Newcastle on several occasions, two well-known visits being in 1925, when he gave several performances at the Victoria Theatre. George Wallace visited the theatre in 1926. Gladys Moncrieff made her first Newcastle appearance with Rio Rita in 1928. It saw an expensive Italian Opera Festival in 1928–29, with 12 operates in 10 days. Other performances included Odiva and Her Seals (1922), Midnight Frolics with Clem Dawe (1928, 1932), Gilbert and Sullivan collection (1905, 1906, 1927, 1936), the Royal Grand Opera in 1935, and the Gala Patriotic Matinee with Roy Mo Rene in 1940.

The theatre was also used for films by Haymarket, Union Theatres, Snider and Dean and, lastly Hoyts, who took control of the Victoria in 1942. CinemaScope was installed around 1955, with no widening of the somewhat decorated proscenium. It is believed that Hoyts repainted the auditorium. Movies shown at the Victoria Theatre included: A Daughter of the Gods, Trader Horn, Gone With The Wind, Seven Little Australians, The 39 Steps, Fantasia, Snow White and the Seven Dwarfs and The White Cliffs of Dover.

J C Williamson's continued to hold live shows there into the 1950s and 1960s. In the 1950s and 1960s, the theatre saw an ice skating show from the United States (1953), Oklahoma! (1953), National Opera seasons in 1951 with Ivan Menzies and 1954, Joan Hammond singing in Tosca in 1957, Ziegfeld Follies (1962), Snow White and the Seven Dwarfs from London (1963), The Sound of Music (1963) and June Bronhill performing The Merry Widow (1964).

After a 90-year career, the theatre quietly closed in 1964 with the Bette Davis film Who's Buried in my Grave. The theatrical apparatus was retained as if might one day be reopened for live theatre, the huge velvet stage curtain hanging forlornly at half-mast.

Since closing the theatre the vestibule (lower foyer) and back stalls area has been subject to alteration for retail purposes. It was bought by W. Eastham for 33,000 pounds in November 1966 and in 1967 it opened as Eastham's Theatre Store. This went into liquidation in 1982. c. 1998 clothing business Jeans Connection rented the building on a weekly basis, creating an internal retail shell. In 1999 the building was bought by Ambrow P/L and opened as a toyshop (Supertoys). In 2004 it was bought by veteran hotelier Arthur Launry, and after being empty and derelict for a decade, it was sold to Century Venues (owners of the Enmore Theatre) in November 2015 with plans to refurbish it to its former glory.

== Performances ==
When in operation, the Victoria was the principal theatre in Newcastle, and over the course of its history had attracted performers such as Gladys Moncrieff, Lily Langtry, Richard Tauber, Joan Hammond and June Bronhill. Touring companies also performed at the Victoria, notably London's D'Oyly Carte Opera Company, as well as ballet troupes. Australian actor Jim Gerald performed at the Victoria Theatre on 4 September 1915 as a part of his country-wide tour. It was the actor's second last performance before joining the Australian Imperial Forces during the First World War.

The dual career of the nation's oldest theatre ended quietly during 1966 with the screening of a Bette Davis 'B' film Who's Buried in my Grave. After 90 years of uninterrupted service, the interior of the Victoria has been left practically untouched by owners to ensure that it maintains the potential to be reopened in the future.

== Description ==
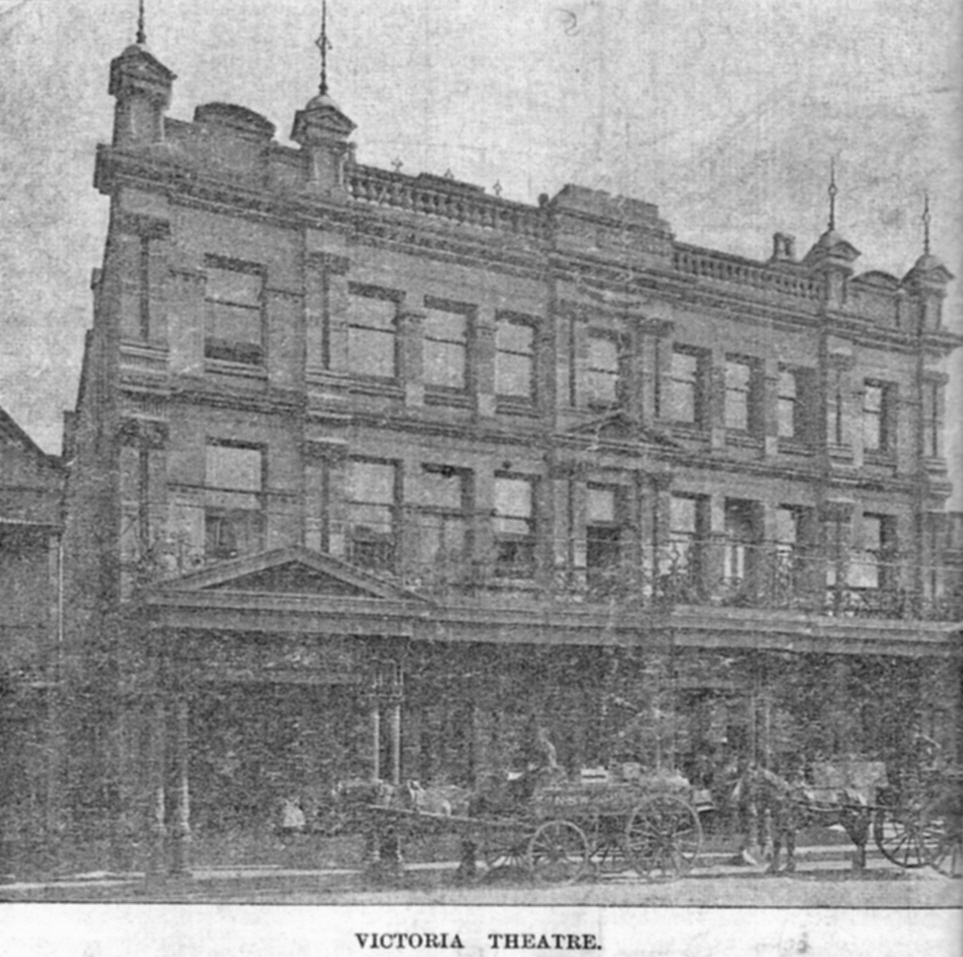
Victoria Theatre, circa 1890s

A highly decorated Victorian facade finished in smooth and modelled stucco with some classical decorative elements. The facade forms the front to a large auditorium of undecorated plain finishes. The facade consists of a ground floor, which has been altered to suit progressive tenants. The two levels above the awning is divided by deep string courses and divided into bays by pilasters. The top is terminated by a richly decorated parapet fence, featuring a central tablet with the building's name in moulded lettering. The facade features recessed blind windows, of grand proportions defined by the pilasters. The blind windows reveal the nature of the building, a theatre, designed to exclude daylight. The central bay on the upper floor features a window. The return walls are unusual in that they step upwards from the facade meeting the roof over the auditorium.

The decorative elements are relatively intact although the metal awning appears to be a later addition and some of the blind windows have been opened for later screens and vets.

The interior dress circle, circle foyer, proscenium, stage, fly tower, dressing rooms, ceilings and walls of the Victoria are all intact. Only the vestibule (lower foyer) and back stalls area has been subject to alteration for retail purposes. The exterior above the awning is also intact, as it was after the 1921 alterations (with the former hotel windows "blinded" when the auditorium was extended).

It was reported to be in good condition as at 2 June 1999.

== Virtual reality recreation ==
In 2018, the interior of the Victoria Theatre was recreated in virtual reality, as it was in 1891 by Dr Gillian Arrighi and staff from the University of Newcastle. Participants were able to experience the foyers, stalls, circle, gallery and stage.

== Heritage listing ==
The Victoria Theatre is a building of State importance. It is the oldest theatre building still standing in New South Wales. It represents an age of silent pictures, vaudeville and early legitimate theatre that no other building can offer in this State, being over 100 years old.

It is virtually intact, except for vestibule/back stalls alterations. Demolition of false shop walls may reveal that even these areas remain unaltered. The theatre represents an 1891 facade, an auditorium that is both 1891 and 1921, with extensive backstage facilities. It is an important part of Newcastle's heritage, but also a significant building for NSW.

Victoria Theatre was listed on the New South Wales State Heritage Register on 27 August 1999 having satisfied the following criteria.

The place is important in demonstrating the course, or pattern, of cultural or natural history in New South Wales.

The Victoria Theatre is the oldest theatre building still standing in New South Wales. It represents an age of silent pictures, vaudeville and early legitimate theatre that no other building can offer in this State - being over 100 years old. The Salvation Army screened early Australian-made features here in 1906. The theatre was used by major Australian live theatre companies, J & N Tait, Fullers's, Clay's Vaudeville and J C Williamson's.

The place is important in demonstrating aesthetic characteristics and/or a high degree of creative or technical achievement in New South Wales.

The Victorian facade is an important part of the Perkins Street streetscape, and one of the city's oldest heritage buildings. The theatre represents an 1891 facade, an auditorium that is both 1891 and 1921, with extensive backstage facilities. The 1921 interior is in a unique simple "modern classical" style of pilastered walls and panelling. The latter is "recilinear" with the exception of small circular panels on the dress circle balcony above frieze of Greek key pattern.

The place has strong or special association with a particular community or cultural group in New South Wales for social, cultural or spiritual reasons.

The Victoria has been an important cultural, entertainment and social facility for the residents of Newcastle for around 80 years. It is still fondly remembered by many older people for the live shows that were staged there.

The place possesses uncommon, rare or endangered aspects of the cultural or natural history of New South Wales.

The Victoria Theatre is the oldest theatre building still standing in New South Wales.
