= Paragon Cafe, Katoomba =

The Paragon
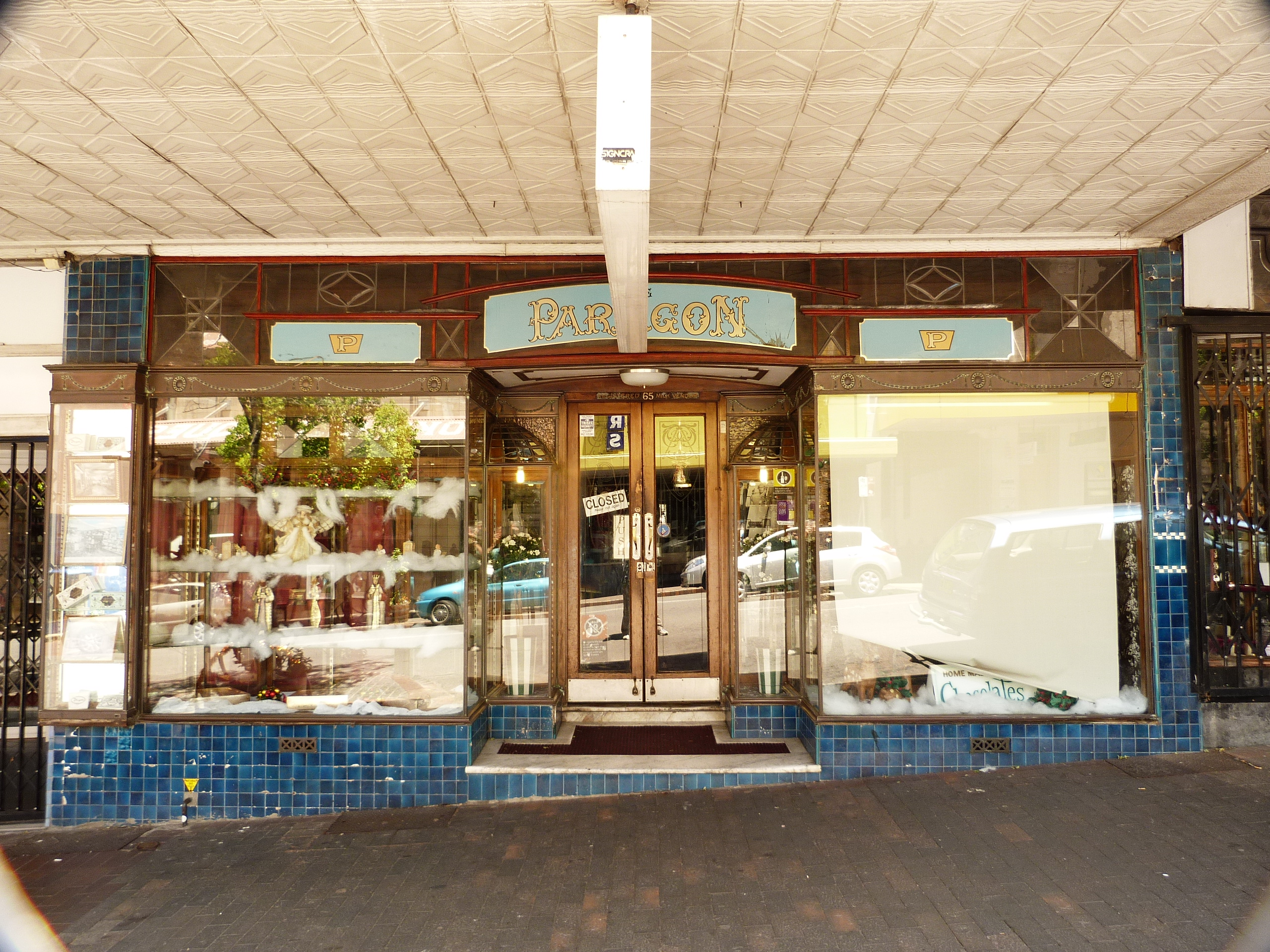
- The Paragon Cafe, pictured in December 2010

- Location within New South Wales Location within Australia
- 33°42′50″S 150°18′41″E
- Location: 65 Katoomba Street, Katoomba, New South Wales, Australia

History
- Built: 1909–1940

Site notes
- Architects: Harry & Ernest Sidgreaves; Harry Lindsay Blackwood; George Newton Kenworthy; Otto Steen
- Architectural style: Interwar Art Deco

New South Wales Heritage Register
- Official name: The Paragon; Paragon Restaurant
- Type: state heritage (built)
- Designated: 5 March 2015
- Reference no.: 1959
- Type: Cafe
- Category: Retail and Wholesale

The Paragon Cafe is a heritage-listed restaurant located at 65 Katoomba Street, Katoomba, New South Wales, Australia. It was designed in successive stages by Harry & Ernest Sidgreaves shopfitters, architects Harry Lindsay Blackwood and George Newton Kenworthy, with decoration by Otto Steen, and built from 1909 to 1940. It is also known as Paragon Restaurant or simply The Paragon. It was added to the New South Wales State Heritage Register on 5 March 2015.

== History ==
=== Indigenous history ===
Prior to European settlement the Blue Mountains was the home of many autonomous Aboriginal groups who lived and moved around the region. There are six distinct tribal groups who have traditional rights and custodial responsibilities for the indigenous heritage of the region that are: the Darug, the Gandangurra, the Wanaruah, the Wiradjuri, the Darkinjung and the Tharawal.

Evidence of Aboriginal occupation and custodianship of the country within Blue Mountains National Park dates back to possibly 22,000 years. The Blue Mountains contain a large number of significant sites which capture the relationship that Aboriginal people have had with country for thousands of generations.

The rich and varied evidence of traditional occupation of the reserves include archaeological deposits in open sites and rock shelters, stone implements, factory sites for tool production, axe grinding grooves and extensive art-work, including drawn, painted and stencilled images. Tracks and figurative motifs dominate the art sites. Motifs include anthropomorphic figures, animals, hand stencils and tracks of birds and kangaroos.

=== Colonial history ===
Katoomba initially developed in a fashion quite distinct from the other Blue Mountains townships along the 1860s railway line. From 1874 onwards trains halted at The Crushers, in the vicinity of the later station, not for passengers but for stone quarried near the later courthouse.

The first settlement in the area was two kilometres (one point two miles) to the south-west of the railway, near Katoomba Falls, where John Britty North opened a coal-mine complex in the Jamison Valley in 1878. There was a village near the top of Katoomba Falls and another village grew up deep down in the valley itself close to the base of the Falls, just below where the Scenic Railway ends today.

North built a private tramway from the top of the incline near Katoomba Falls to join the Main Western railway line at what is now known as Shell Corner, a kilometre west of the present station. All this diverted attention away from the current core area of the urban development, the area on either side of Katoomba Street, that essential north–south connecting link between the railway and Echo Point.

This area around Katoomba Street was within the large land-holding of James Henry Neale, a master butcher and Sydney politician, who had been a member of the New South Wales Legislative Assembly from 1864 until 1874. In 1877 Neale built a country retreat called Froma on what is now the new Cultural Centre site on the east side of Parke Street. In 1881 Neale sold his interest in central Katoomba, including the house, to Frederick Clissold. Clissold, a wool-merchant resident in the Sydney suburb of Ashfield, immediately sub-divided the land, creating and naming the modern street system.

Parke, Katoomba and Lurline Streets were created, running north–south, while Waratah Street ran east–west and defined the southern edge of the initial commercial centre of the new town. The Great Western Highway and the railway defined the northern limit. Katoomba changed rapidly; it started as only two industrial halts on the railway, with stone for railway works at one and at the other a private tramway leading down to a coal-mine and two mining villages. Then it became a characteristic Mountains town relating to a proper railway station, as the 78 allotments created in 1881 were, over two decades, purchased and developed.

During this period from the 1880s up to the World War I, the whole area below The Carrington, quite close to the railway station, along Katoomba, Parke and Lurline Streets, became a busy commercial precinct, dominated by shops, services and a cluster of guesthouses, tempered by a remarkable number of churches (Anglican, Methodist, Presbyterian, Catholic and Congregationalist) along with their halls and manses.

The influx of seasonal tourists and the increasing number of permanent residents who serviced the tourists created a need for local services, so the area between the station and Waratah Street gradually filled up with shops, restaurants, cafes, two theatres and public utilities, such as the post office and the public school. There was still a lot of free space in 1906, captured in a marvellous photograph showing south Katoomba from the most spectacular of the early consolidations, the Great Western Hotel of 1882, better known as the Carrington, on its spacious hill-top site. Froma was still there in 1906, just below the Carrington although it was demolished six years later.

Between Froma and Katoomba Street, the site of the later Paragon was a large, empty space, which remained undeveloped until 1909, when William Newlind built four shops on the vacant Katoomba Street block. Newlind had built the four shops as a speculation and three of them were soon bought as an investment by the Anglican rector of St Hilda's, just across the street. These were all retail shops until 1916 when one was converted into refreshment rooms, called The Paragon.

=== Paragon Cafe and Zacharias Simos ===
This was just at the beginning of a new phenomenon in Australian country towns, the Greek cafe. From the early 1910s onwards a number of emigres from Greece, often with experience of the United States, created a new cafe experience in cities and towns throughout Australia. The Greek cafe was "essentially an evolutionary amalgam" of the Greek coffee-house and the American-oyster saloon and soda parlour with the familiar fare of the existing British-Australian steak-houses. The names of the cafes, Californian, Golden Gate, Niagara on the one hand and Acropolis, Parthenon, Paragon on the other, reflected the shared inheritance.

In Katoomba a drapery store built at 92 Bathurst Road near the station about 1905 was converted in 1917 to a Greek cafe called the Acropolis and soon rechristened the Niagara to emphasise its trendy American drinks. This is the Australian environment which a fifteen-year-old Greek boy called Zacharias Theodore "Jack" Simos found when he migrated from Greece in 1912. He found work in Greek cafes in Sydney, Windsor and in Tenterfield. By 1916 he was in Katoomba, where in a brief partnership with Demetruos Sophios he became a fruiterer and a confectioner, opening his own premises in Katoomba called the Paragon Cafe and Oyster Palace.

The Paragon and adjoining shopfronts (63-69 Katoomba Street) is located on Lot 21 of land in Katoomba owned by James Neale and subdivided in the 1880s. The lot was purchased by William Newlind in 1886. Four shops, nos. 63 to 69, were built on Newlind's land in 1909. The three to the north, nos 63 to 67, including the future Paragon, were all owned in 1911 by the Rev. John Russell, who was the Anglican rector of St Hilda's across the street from 1902 until 1913. Since Russell did not own the fourth shop, it is likely that he was not responsible for building on the site but merely bought existing new shops as an investment. He retained ownership of the properties until 1924. From this date Russell maintained only one investment property in Katoomba: No.100-102 Katoomba Street (Rate Books). It is believed the income from the shops was an important part of Russell's income, particularly after Russell went to Sydney as senior curate to the rector of St James.

Russell leased the shops as three separate entities. By 1914 No. 63 was leased by a jeweller, L.P. Goldstein. He bought the freehold from Russell in 1924. The shop was later occupied by another jeweller, H. Lloyd. Jewellers have continued to occupy the shop for most of its history. No. 65 was leased by Russell to a series of shopkeepers - Sullivan in 1914-6 and Dagon from 1917 to 1919. By 1923 he had leased it to Zacharias Simos as refreshment rooms called The Paragon, and in 1924 Zacharias Simos purchased both nos. 65 and 67 from Russell.

Simos was a Greek migrant who had arrived in Sydney early in the century. He migrated to Sydney in 1912 and like many of his countrymen worked in Greek cafes and other food related businesses in NSW. His arrival in Sydney predated the post world war one arrival of many young men from countries such as Greece and Italy after the United States began limiting the numbers of Southern Europeans it allowed into the country. Many of the young men paid their way to Australia and found work in the food industry.

Zacharias Simos worked in Sydney and Tenterfield for the first four years before setting up a business at Windsor where he sold ham and eggs next door to a skating rink and sold vegetables door to door. During this time he saved his money and learned English sufficiently well to establish himself as a confectioner in Katoomba. During this time he worked as a caterer. Zacharias Simos was naturalised in 1921and bought a commercial property at 110-114 Katoomba Street owned by Miss Kelly and previously run by a Mrs Banning. Three years later he purchased the refreshment rooms at 65 and 67 Katoomba Street.

In 1925 Zacharias Simos employed H. & E. Sidgreaves, the shop-fitting firm responsible for the design of Washington H. Soul's Sydney pharmacies, to convert the interior of the cafe premises on classical (Art Deco) lines, along with local architect Harry Lindsay Blackwood. A soda fountain, of the finest Moruya marble, and booths of Queensland maple were installed as were the timber-panelled walls decorated with alabaster friezes depicting classical Greek figures. The fine and intact leadlight shopfronts which characterise the building were probably included in this work and have become an important part of the architectural character of Katoomba Street. The street contains many other fine examples of glazed shopfronts from the 1920s and it has been suggested that together they may be the largest extant collection of 1920s leadlight shopfronts in NSW and comparable to Canowindra in the central west of NSW.

Upstairs in 1925 was the industrial side of the enterprise, not open to the public. There was a bakehouse, a large refrigeration plant for the ice-cream made on the premises and a new "sweet factory", with a gas boiler and a forced-air draught for cooling the chocolate.

The technology of the chocolaterie is well documented, although the equipment was dismantled a decade ago. The chocolate-making equipment is still stored upstairs and on April 10, 2013, members of the Australian Society for the History of Engineering & Technology (ASHET) committee inspected and photographed the various items. This industrial dimension to the Paragon is of exceptional importance. Chocolate-making at the Paragon had been of a high order ever since Zacharias Simos had been joined by his two brothers: George was a master confectioner and they were trading as Simos Brothers by 1926.

Originally, Zacharias Simos lived above the shop, in that part of the upstairs rabbit-warren overlooking Katoomba Street which was not used for making chocolates or for baking cakes. The bakery and the chocolaterie which gave The Paragon so much of its distinction were located upstairs from the mid-1920s, so the products which gave the place such well-deserved fame were made on site. The earlier chocolate-making machinery and some of the baking equipment was dismantled and stored in a short corridor upstairs about ten years ago, but a historic photograph at the Paragon today shows every item in use forty years ago.

The equipment has been assessed by members of Australian Society for the History of Engineering and Technology. It is striking how international it all is. The Simos brothers took some trouble to acquire the best available machinery. Small and Shattell Pty Ltd, Melbourne-based engineers who specialised in baking equipment, along with Star Machinery of Alexandria, are among the few Australian firms patronised.

A major French firm, Kstner frres of Lyon, had been making bakery equipment for the world for fifty years. There is also another piece of equipment from the firm when it was located not in Lyons but in Paris and Aubervilliers. America, with which the Simos had strong connections, was not overlooked. Metal piping was made by Walworth of Boston.

The confectionery equipment was made by the prestigious firm BCH. What became the major modern firm called BCH had originated in the mid-nineteenth century in the separate works of William Brierley, Luke Collier and Thomas Hartley. Luke Collier was a specialist confectioner from 1835; Brierley was a brass-founder, specialising in confectionery work from 1844 onwards; and Hartley was also an independent specialist in chocolate-making. The Brierley and Collier firms amalgamated in 1913 and this firm joined forces with the Hartley family in 1924. Operating out of Rochdale in England the Brierley-Collier-Hartley firm went from strength to strength and finally became BCH. Simos seems to have ordered this equipment from BCH in the decade after the final amalgamation of 1924.

In 1929 Zacharias returned to Kythera and spent a year in Europe observing trends in confectionery manufacture and cafe culture. He also arranged to import new ingredients and learned about presentation and packaging. On Kythera he met and courted Mary (Maria) Panaretos (1912-2001). She had been born on 20 June 1912 at Elkton, Maryland, United States of America, where her parents were cafe proprietors who regularly spent the summer months on Kythera. Mary and Zacharias married there on 30 January 1930 and reached Katoomba later that year.

Zacharias Simos and his wife set about turning the Paragon into a high class refreshment room. The popular Katoomba landmark Orphan Rock became his trademark, an image of the "stand-alone" excellence to which he aspired. Mary became an identifiable figure at the Paragon. She was generous and cultured, and always on hand to welcome visitors and press chocolates into the hands of children.

Zacharias also began planning two large extensions at the rear of his cafe: the banquet hall (1934), influenced by pre-Columbian decoration, and the blue room (1936), in "ocean liner" style, with mirrored walls and sprung dance floor. (ADB). The design of these 1930s interiors has been attributed to theatre architect Henry Eli White however he had ceased practice by this time, and more recent research attributes the work to his former partner George Newton Kenworthy. The upper level facade of the cafe is clearly in the Art Deco style and may also date from this time, and be the work of Kenworthy.

In the late 1930s Zacharias and Mary bought vacant land on what is now Cliff Drive down at Echo Point and in 1940 they again commissioned G. N. Kenworthy to design a striking curve-fronted Streamline Moderne style house, which they called Olympus. Despite some additions to the upper frontage in the 1980s, the house and its important outbuildings, (garage, pergola, summer-house, fuel store), have retained a great deal of integrity. This is the necessary corollary to the Paragon, blending perfectly with the developed facade of the famous cafe.

In the early post war years a decorative relief sculpture by Otto Steen depicting various characters from Greek mythology was installed in the Dining Room. He was a student of Raynor Hoff who created the sculptures for the ANZAC War Memorial in the Sydney. Steen worked with Hoff at the memorial. Steen's other decorative works include those in two major Sydney buildings in the 1930s - the Trocadero in George Street and the AWA Building in York Street. He was also responsible for the relief sculptures at Everglades, Leura. Steen is now considered one of the twentieth century's accomplished sculptors who made a significant contribution to NSW's interwar and post war heritage.

The Paragon gained a wide reputation. Its ice creams were originally hand churned and frozen with American ammonia freezing machines and sundaes blended with syrups and fruit ingredients, often specially imported. The art deco ambience attracted devoted customers. With the help of his brothers Peter and George, bread, cakes and pastries were manufactured on the premises, as well as chocolates and other confectioneries sold in exquisitely designed and coloured boxes (ADB). In this period the Blue Mountains was among NSW's most important holiday and recreation centres and Katoomba was a focal point of this activity. The Paragon also catered to more adult tastes and would later be described as one of the smartest cocktail bars in the art deco style in Australia.

The shop at number 69 was bought in the 1930s by Mary Simos so that the three shops, nos. 65, 67, and 69, were all in the Simos family control (Rate Books). The shop at no.69 had a different owner when constructed in 1909, Reuben S. Hofman. Hofman appears to have used it as his own draper's shop. After his retirement, Hofman leased no.69 initially to E. Luce, also a draper, in the early 1920s, but it became a confectioner's in the mid-1920s, competing with the Paragon.

The Simos' primary residence was Olympus; they also maintained a home in Sydney at Centennial Park. Zacharias devoted many hours to his garden - meaning the Paragon always had fresh flowers - loved music, played the violin and was a keen fisherman and backgammon player. Enjoying travel, he visited Europe, the US and Kythera several times. He was a foundation member of Katoomba Rotary Club, which for many years held its meetings in the Paragon.

Zacharias died on 15 November 1976 in Royal Prince Alfred Hospital, Sydney, and was buried in Randwick cemetery following a funeral at St George's Greek Orthodox Church, Rose Bay. His wife, carried on as manager of The Paragon until 1987. Mary Simos died on 15 May 2001 at Rose Bay and was buried beside her husband.

=== Subsequent ownership ===
The cafe was sold in 2000.

The tea-room has remained as a remarkably intact example of Interwar Art Deco.

Robyn Parker was the proprietor of the Paragon from May 2011 to May 2018, and worked to regain its original splendour. She played an important role in having the site listed on the NSW State Heritage Register. She vacated the building in May 2018 after negotiations with the landlord failed to result in either building maintenance or a rent cut. Following Parker's departure, the cafe has been closed, with both landlord and former tenant making claims to the Paragon name.

In June 2026, the Paragon was in a deteriorating state, leading Penny Sharpe as the Minister for Heritage to take owners Conset Investments to the Land and Environment Court of New South Wales.

== The Paragon's architects ==
=== Harry and Ernest Sidgreaves ===
Harry and Ernest Sidgreaves established a modest retail shopfitting workshop in Sydney's Surry Hills in 1917 and were later joined by their father John and youngest brother Harold. They moved their factory to Redfern in the early 1920s where the company carried on business until 1984 when it relocated to Silverwater. Sidgreaves undertook much shopfront construction during the interwar period in Sydney and surrounds. This included one of their most celebrated early works, a streamlined shopfront for G. A. Zink and Son in Oxford Street, East Sydney, 1938.

In 2005, the company relocated to larger and more contemporary offices in Annandale where it remains today. Throughout the 90+ year history of the company, Sidgreaves has specialised in all areas of interior refurbishment from major department stores, specialty retailers, financial institutions and commercial offices through to hotels, clubs and pharmacies. In the 21st century Sidgreaves ranks many national and international companies amongst its clients in Australia including Burberry, Versace, Jimmy Choo, Saba and Sheridan.

=== Otto Steen ===
Otto Steen studied at the Royal Academy, Copenhagen under Utzon Frank 1923–1925. He studied under Raynor Hoff at East Sydney Technical College from 1928 to 1930 and worked as Hoff's assistant on the ANZAC memorial. As Hoff's student, Steen was part of perhaps the only instance of coherent (European) group production of sculpture in Australia. The unity of style and subject matter of the sculptures created by Hoff and his students was so great that the works have been designated as part of 'the Hoff School". The theme of Greek mythology in Steen's work at The Paragon reflected the influence of his work as a member of the Hoff School with its classicist tendencies. It was a local decision made on behalf of the local community with input from appropriate experts. Steen completed reliefs at King George V Hospital in Sydney (1941) as well as those at the Trocadero, Sydney, 1936 (frieze), the AWA building, Sydney, 1939 (mosaic, relief), Everglades and The Paragon.

=== Henry White ===
The New South Wales Heritage Register entry for the Paragon Cafe states that "the design of the 1925 and 1930s interiors has generally been attributed to Henry Eli White", however there is no direct record of his involvement. The 1920s work was by local architect Harry Lindsay Blackwood and Harry and Ernest Sidgreaves shopfitters, rather than Henry White. The 1930s work could not have been by White as he had ceased practicing by 1930, instead George Newton Kenworthy is recorded as the architect. Kenworthy had worked as a senior architect in White's office in the 1920s, before starting his own practice in 1929, and this perhaps is where the confusion comes from.

=== George Newton Kenworthy ===
G N Kenworthy was a lead architect and project manager in the offices of prolific theatre architect Henry Eli White in the 1920s, before branching out on his own in 1929. Kenworthy went on to design a number of theatres and cinemas in the 1930s in the Art Deco style, notably the Cremorne Orpheum, as well as the Royal Hotel, Orange, and the Simos' house Olympus in 1940. In 1934, he was also the architect for a large ballroom and coffee lounge in the basement of the State Theatre, known as the State Ballroom and State Coffee Lounge, in the style of the original.

== Description ==
63-69 Katoomba Street has a two-storey rendered inter-war art deco facade to Katoomba Street with retail premises at ground level. 1930s copper clad shopfronts survive to the northern two shops and feature the names of the shops at that period: Lloyds Jeweller at no. 63 and the Paragon at no. 65. The Paragon also features curved display windows either side of the recessed entry and display cases on the tiled piers.

The upper level is divided into four bays each with multi-paned glazed doors opening to rendered bay form balconies. Concrete hoods on shallow corbelled brackets overhang the doors. Vertical chevron mouldings at the centre of a stepped parapet mark the second bay from the north, over The Paragon and hold the vertical sign advertising the restaurant.

The building has its 1930s awning, with its original pressed metal soffit, extending over Froma Lane to the south.

Internally, The Paragon restaurant retains its inter-war art deco interiors. The front section has a panelled timber shop fitout and timber booth seating with panelled timber walls and plaster moulds of classical figures. Original chairs with the "P" motif for the restaurant remain in service.

The rear rooms of The Paragon are fitted behind the adjacent shops and feature a ballroom/dining room lined with timber veneers with a coved plaster ceiling to the south influenced by the decor of ocean liners. To the north is the bar (former banquet hall) with perforated plaster friezework showing a pre-Columbian influence in its motifs. The toilet spaces also retain much of their original fitout.

The retail premises at 63 (formerly jeweller) and 69 (chemist) Katoomba Street have been internally fit-out with modern shop fitouts. Some early fabric my survive at tenancy at No.63 but the tenancy at No.69 has been extensively modified. Modern ligthbox style signs are located in front of Nos. 63 and 69.

=== Condition ===
As at 17 January 2013, Basically good, but in need of conservation internally and of work to secure the building against potential rain damage and water ingress at ground floor level at the rear of the building.

The Paragon is quite intact retaining much of its significant art deco detailing

=== Modifications and dates ===
- 1925 - Fitout by H & E Sidgreaves - (65-67)
- 1934 - Banquet Hall Extension
- 1936 - Blue Room extension
- 1930s - Neighbouring shop added to the Paragon (69)
- 1940 - Classical plaques created by Otto Steen

== See also ==
- Australian non-residential architectural styles
- O.L. Steen watercolour designs for Paragon's classical wall cameos, c. 1945 - 1950, State Library of New South Wales, PXA 872
