= George Newton Kenworthy =

English-born Australian architect (1885–1954)

- Born: 1885; Manchester, United Kingdom
- Died: 28 October 1954 (aged 68–69); Lindfield, New South Wales, Australia
- Education: University of Liverpool School of Architecture
- Occupation: Architect
- Spouse: Florence Kenworthy
- Children: Herbert Kenworthy
- Practice: H. E. White (1923-1929)
- Buildings: Cremorne Orpheum Theatre (1935)

George Newton Kenworthy FRAIA, also known as G. N. Kenworthy or "Kennie" (1885 – 28 October 1954), was a leading Sydney architect and Fellow of the Royal Australian Institute of Architects best associated for his work in partnership with Henry Eli White and for his building designs (particularly theatres) in the Art Deco, Streamline Moderne, Functionalist and Spanish Mission styles.

== Early life ==
Kenworthy was born in 1885 in Manchester, England and was first educated at Trinity Grammar School and the Victoria School of Arts in Lancashire. He studied architecture at the University of Liverpool School of Architecture and qualified as an architect in 1906. First articled to Francis Redfern, Kenworthy worked for several leading architectural firms in England before starting his own practice in 1909 in Southport.

== Practice in Australia ==
In 1911, Kenworthy moved to Sydney, Australia, taking up a position in the New South Wales Government Architect's Office, where he remained until 1923, having risen to be Architect-in-Chief, Secretary's Department, Theatres and Public Halls Section. From 1914 to 1922 he was also a part-time lecturer in Architecture at the Sydney Technical College. Until 1951 an examiner for the Board of Architects and the Sydney Technical College, Kenworthy was made a Fellow of the Royal Australian Institute of Architects, having also served on the Institute Council and Education Committee.

In 1923, Kenworthy left the NSW Public Service and became a partner in the firm of Henry Eli White, where he worked on many significant projects in New South Wales, Victoria, Queensland and New Zealand, including fourteen theatres such as the State Theatre, Sydney, Newcastle Civic Theatre, St. James Theatre, Auckland, Hengrove Hall, Macquarie Street, Chalfont Chambers, Phillip Street, St Kilda's Palais Theatre and the Melbourne Athenaeum. He left White's firm in 1929 to start his own practice at 105 Pitt Street, Sydney, where he stayed until his death, working all manner of works though theatres were most prominent as "a recognised authority on the design and construction of theatres and auditoria generally", including the Cremorne Orpheum, Mudgee Regent, Hurstville Savoy, Bankstown Regent and the Port Macquarie Ritz. At a speech to the Institute of Architects at Science House in 1933, Kenworthy observed that the modern theatre building "should be designed for both stage plays and talking pictures, and entrances and foyers should be spacious, and not cluttered up with soda fountains and confectionery counters."

On his death at his Lindfield residence at age 69 in 1954, he was described as "a man of brilliant brain and kind heart ... He deeply loved Australia and never returned to England—not even for a holiday—and, to use his own words, has left his mark on the skyline of Sydney."

== List of works (incomplete) ==
- Alterations to the Rialto Theatre – The Corso, Manly (1932–1933; Demolished 1960).
- Spanish Mission style house – Vaucluse (c. 1933).
- "Parthenon" house – 7 Robertson Road, Centennial Park (1934; Extant).
- State Ballroom and State Coffee Lounge (in the basement of the State Theatre and in the style of the theatre above), Market Street, Sydney (1934, Demolished)
- Cremorne Orpheum Theatre – 380 Military Road, Cremorne (1935; Extant, now Hayden Orpheum Picture Palace).
- Spanish mission style house – 81 Shirley Road, Roseville (1935; Extant).
- W. R. Angus Residence – 1163 & 1161 Pacific Highway, Pymble (1935; Extant).
- Regent Theatre – 5-7 Church Street, Mudgee (1935; Extant).
- Addition of Ballroom and Supper Room to the Paragon Cafe – 63-69 Katoomba Street, Katoomba (1935; Extant).
- "The Vanderbilt" residential flat building – 2 Ward Avenue, Elizabeth Bay (1936; Extant).
- Strand Theatre – John Street, Singleton (1937; Demolished).
- Savoy Theatre – 14-16 Ormonde Parade, Hurstville (1937; Demolished 1995).
- Ritz Theatre – 22-28 Horton Street, Port Macquarie (1937; Extant, but altered internally and renamed Majestic).
- Remodelling to the Royal Hotel – 232 Lords Place, Orange (1937; Extant).
- Alterations to the Enfield Savoy Theatre (1938; Extant).
- "Olympus" house – 12 Cliff Drive, Katoomba (c. 1940; Extant).
- Remodelling of Majestic Theatre (renamed Bankstown Civic Theatre) – 299 South Terrace, Bankstown (1940; Demolished 1970)
- "Ozone" Flats and Cafe – Corner Beach Street and The Esplanade, Ettalong Beach (1941; Demolished).
- 2UW Radio Theatre – 464 George Street, Sydney (1944; Demolished but Globe Theatre building extant).
