= Henry Eli White =

New Zealand architect (1876–1952)

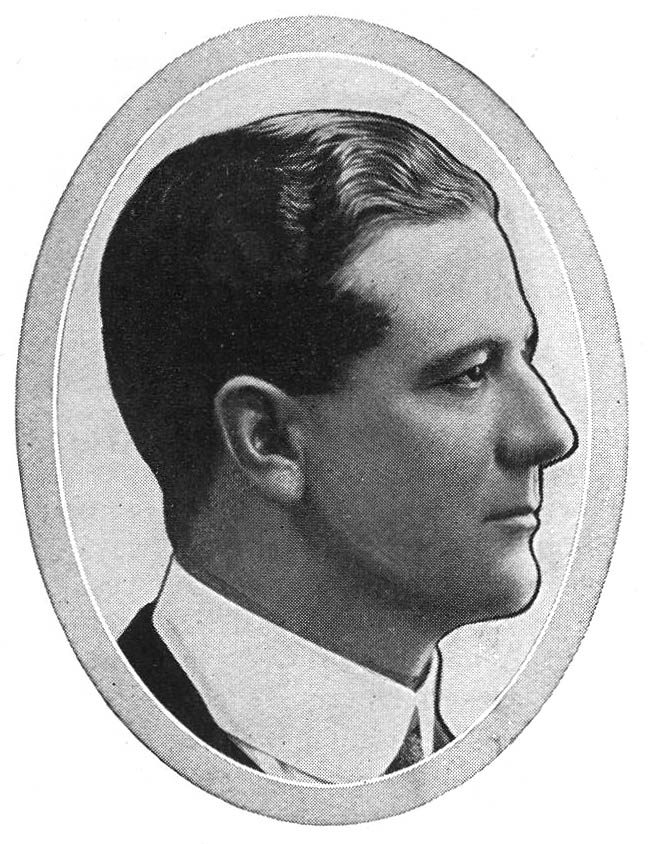
- Henry Eli White, c. 1916
- Born: 21 August 1876; Dunedin, New Zealand
- Died: 3 March 1952 (aged 75); Sydney, New South Wales, Australia
- Occupation: Architect
- Years active: 1896−1930

Henry Eli White (21 August 1876 – 3 March 1952), also known as Harry White, was a New Zealand-born architect best known for the many theatres and cinemas he designed in New Zealand and Australia in the 1910s and 1920s. Many of the major surviving historic venues in the two countries are White designs, including the St. James Theatre, Wellington, St. James Theatre, Auckland, the Capitol Theatre and State Theatre in Sydney, and the Palais Theatre and the interiors of the Princess Theatre and Athenaeum Theatre in Melbourne. He also designed the City Hall and the attached Civic Theatre in Newcastle, New South Wales.

== Personal life ==
White was born on 21 August 1876 in Dunedin, New Zealand, son of English migrant parents Joseph Eli White and wife Susanna. Joseph Eli White established himself as a bricklayer then a builder and contractor, and by the 1900s he had built many major landmarks in Dunedin, and been elected Councillor and Mayor of the municipality of North East Valley.

Henry appears to have left school at an early age, and probably joined his father's contracting business then established his own business as a builder in 1896. He married Margaret Hallinan at Dunedin on 24 December 1900 and they had four children.

In 1903 he relocated himself and his family to Christchurch where he worked as builder and manufacturer of building supplies and equipment, and moved into engineering. He was the builder or contractor for the Royal Exchange Building and The Press Building, both large projects on Cathedral Square (and both now demolished). In 1909 he won the contract for a major tunnel required as an upgrade of the Waipori River hydro-electric scheme, the same year as his first theatre project.

More theatres quickly followed, and after gaining commissions in Australia, he opened an office in Sydney by 1913, and soon moved his family there. He ran a very successful architectural practice though the 1910s and into the 1920s, designing numerous theatres and cinemas in both countries, as well as other commercial projects mainly in the Sydney area in the 1920s. By the late 1920s, he was able to maintain a flamboyant lifestyle with a large harbour-front house in the exclusive Sydney suburb of Point Piper, a yacht and a luxury car. At over six feet (180 cm) tall, and weighing more than 16 stone (100 kg), he was known as 'Big Henry'.

His architectural career ended abruptly with the onset of the Great Depression in Australia, when new projects dried up completely. In 1930 he won a competition for a college to be built in Auckland, and soon moved there and closed the Sydney office, but it did not eventuate. His activities in the next few years, other than owning a farm near Hamilton, are unknown. By 1935 he was back in Sydney at his (heavily mortgaged) Point Piper house, which became a reception centre managed by Claire Whitcombe from New Zealand, who supplanted his wife. Though replacing his car with an older one, he kept his yacht, sailing and winning races in 1936. He proposed a 9-storey block of flats for his houses' garden in 1937, but this was rejected by Woollahra Council.

In 1940 he started a new venture, opening a dolomite quarry at Georges Plains, near Bathurst, but after disappointing earnings closed it in 1948 when he finally sold the Point Piper house and moved to a small flat at Kings Cross with Claire.

He died there aged 75 on 3 March 1952, survived by his estranged wife and two sons, and was cremated with Anglican rites. He had reputedly earned over £1 million in architectural fees in his heyday, but after 22 years with no architectural work, his probate was only valued at £1147.

== Architectural practice ==
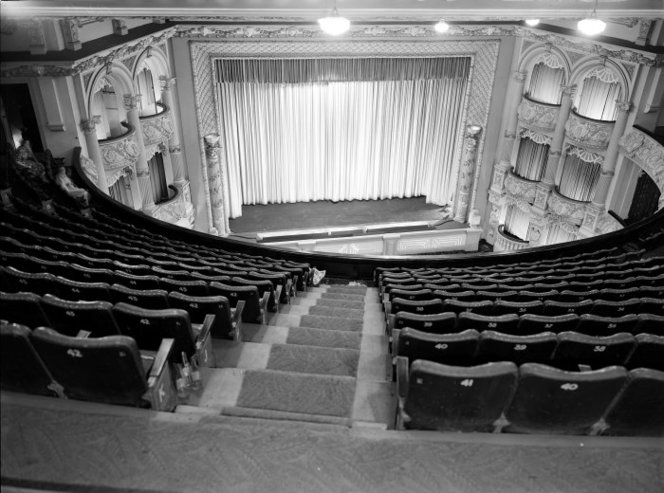
St James Theatre Wellington, 1912, Louis XVI style

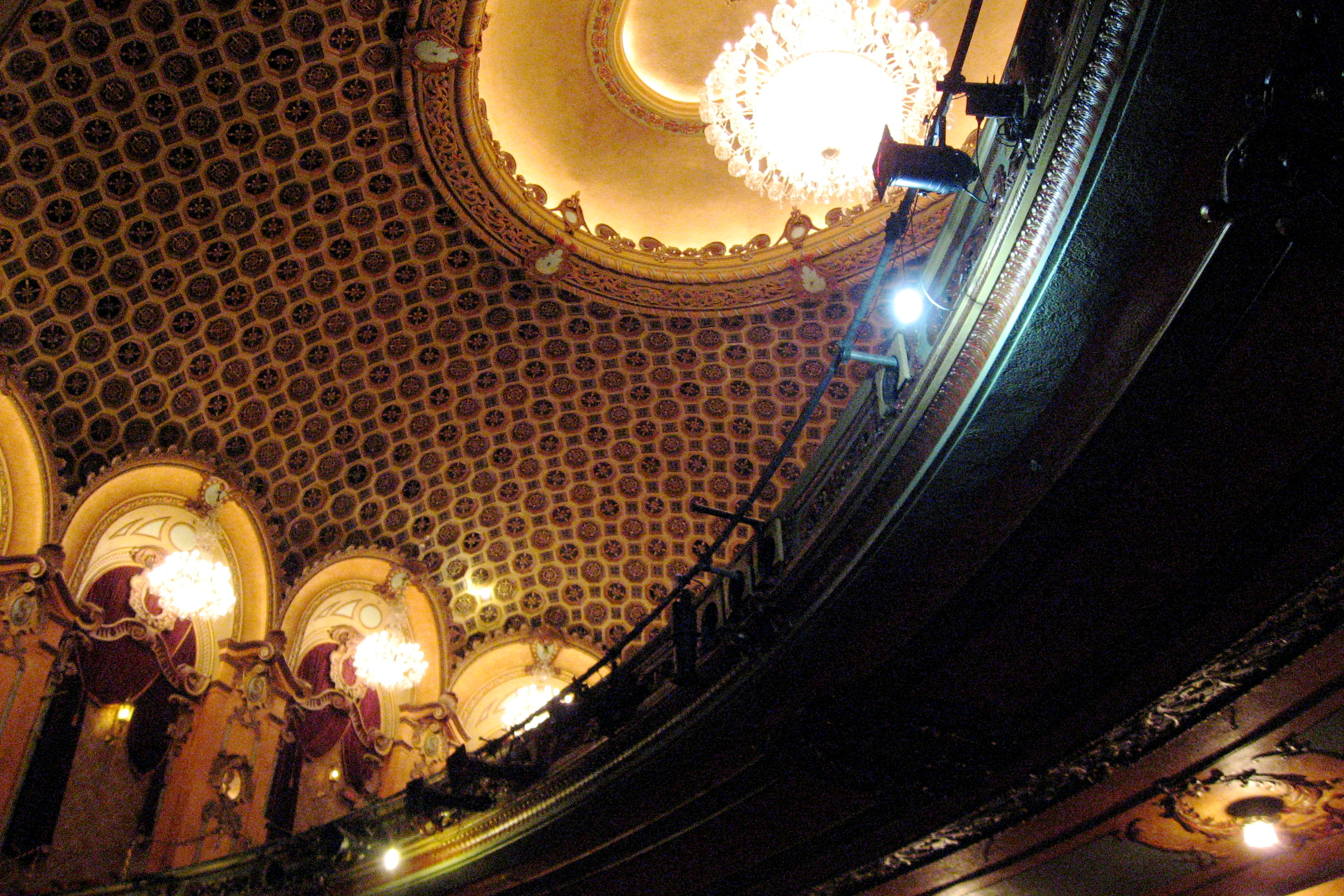
State Theatre, Sydney, 1929, Classical Picture Palace style

In 1909, having established himself as a builder of large projects, and then as an engineer in Christchurch, White's career as an architectural designer began with a commission to improve the Princess Theatre in his home town of Dunedin by John Fuller & Sons theatrical management company. Using his engineering skills he replaced the six posts that supported the balcony along the front that blocked views (up until then a common practice) with three steel posts set back from the front in late 1909. The next year he performed the same 'trick' at the Auckland Opera House.

The year after that he was employed to completely remodel the Theatre Royal, Timaru, which involved inserting a whole new auditorium, with a balcony supported on only three posts set well back. This was his first foray into architecture as an art, designing the decoration of the interior in gilt Rococo plasterwork, typical for theatres at the time. He followed this with His Majesty's, Blenheim (dem), the next year, his first complete building; the auditorium repeated many of the features he used in Timaru.

Then in 1911 came his first commission for a large theatre, His Majesty's (now St James), Wellington, again for Fuller's, opening in 1912, for which he relocated his practice to that city. In 1913 he gave an interview outlining his particular interest in the design of theatres, especially concerned with sightlines, and also claimed to have already built or rebuilt nearly 10 theatres in New Zealand, This is probably an exaggeration, but many more theatres and 'picture theatres' (early ones also had stages suitable for live performances) soon followed both in New Zealand and in Australia, with seven in 1916 alone, many for Fullers. The 1910s was something of a high point for theatre construction, with increasing leisure time and just before cinema boomed in popularity, especially in New Zealand where even quite small towns had at least one live theatre.

With the death in 1918 of William Pitt, who had been the premier theatre architect in Australasia from the late 1890s, Henry Eli White became the premier theatre designer in Australia and New Zealand. He not only designed entirely new theatres, but theatre design often involved the creation of new or renovated auditoriums in existing theatres, of which he did three in Melbourne and at least three in Sydney, as well as various minor alterations.

The architectural styles White used were generally typical for their eras. His early theatres had restrained classical or Edwardian Baroque exteriors, and Rococo or Louis XV interiors with lush plaster decoration and gilded highlights. Elements were often repeated in different designs in different cities, such as the tiers of paired side boxes, with columns and caryatids, seen at His Majesty's, Wellington and the Grand Opera House/Adelphi in Sydney (dem). Some of his earlier designs had Spanish / Mediterranean style exteriors, notably the 1913 Tivoli in Brisbane, and four smaller theatres now all demolished (Everybody's, Gisborne, The Cosy, Masterton, the Grand, Petone, and the Majestic, Brisbane). Art Nouveau also made an appearance, notably the Secession inspired exterior of the Strand, Christchurch (dem), and the interior of the Hawkes Bay Opera House (which has a Spanish exterior). From the early 1920s, his theatre designs generally adopted a refined Adam style, seen at the Princess Theatre and the Athenaeum, both in Melbourne. He was the chief architect for the firm of Birch, Carroll and Coyle who established the Wintergarden theatre circuit, especially prominent in rural Queensland, with White designed theatres built in the later 1920s in Townsville, Rockhampton and Ipswich, as well as one in Rose Bay, Sydney (all now demolished). While Townsville was Spanish in style the others had restrained Neoclassical auditoriums, with Ipswich and Rockhampton featuring large relatively plain brick facades. His designs for the later 1920s St James, Auckland and the Civic Theatre Newcastle have an elaborate Spanish flavour, with elements seen in his 1920s cinema designs, and are versions of each other.

He also designed a number of cinemas throughout his career, which often included staging facilities for intermission shows, and were usually known as theatres. Though there were other more prolific designers in this field, he is known for designing major picture palaces in Sydney and Melbourne, all of which still exist. His largest cinema commission, and still the largest in Australia with nearly 3000 seats, was the eclectically-styled Palais Theatre in the bayside suburb of St Kilda, Melbourne, built in 1927. In Sydney, he was the architect for the interior remodelling that produced the Capitol Theatre at the Haymarket in 1928, though the 'atmospheric' Florentine Garden interior is largely credited to US architect John Eberson, who is also noted as 'co-designer' with White for the other surviving Picture Palace in Sydney, the 1929 'Louis XIV' style State Theatre. The palatial State, with its lavish use of marble, gold and ivory decoration, paintings and sculpture, is the most elaborate design associated with White. The street foyer is an elaborate Gothic fantasy with a gilded fan-vaulted ceiling, the lobby a grand domed classical room with Baroque curved stairs, and the auditorium features rococo detailing, multiple crystal chandeliers and a coffered domed ceiling. Even the 'retiring rooms' are elaborate, ranging from the clubby 'Pioneer Room', to the delicately painted 'Butterfly Room', and the angular 'Futurist Room'.

He also designed a number of other buildings through the 1920s in a variety of styles. The six-storey Midland Hotel (1925, demolished) in Wellington was Spanish style, the State Shopping Block above the State Theatre was 1920s Commercial Gothic, matching the style of the street foyer, while the offices above St James' were Neoclassical. The three ‘chambers’ buildings in Sydney were all different, with Hengrove Hall adopting an elaborate Tudor style (based on the English original), Stanton House in a restrained vertical Art Deco style, and Chalfont in a more decorative rectilinear Jazz Moderne. The design for the massive Bunnerong Power Station was a bold Stripped Classical style with a large cornice (though the built version was much simplified), and the Newcastle City Hall is an outstanding example of the Inter-War Academic Classical, executed in sandstone.

White is said to have “...designed over 130 theatres.", but this number is certainly an exaggeration since nowhere near this many (live) theatres existed in the 1910s and 20s in all the cities and towns of Australasia. It seems that White was prone to exaggeration and self-aggrandisement, as theatre historian Ross Thorne discusses in his 2015 book The Self Styled Golden King, a title that White apparently gave himself. Thorne's research has found about 40 theatres and cinemas altogether, of which the majority have been demolished or completely altered. He also suggests that White may not have been the principal designer for all the works his office produced, but may have come from his staff, for instance the Spanish style was mainly used in 1914–15 during the tenure of office manager architect Lewis Kaberry, who went on to design many theatres later as Kaberry & Chard (for instance the Spanish style New Malvern in Melbourne in 1921). As well as the two major cinemas that were essentially Eberson designs (but whose involvement was downplayed at the time), the State and Capitol in Sydney, his major projects in the late 1920s were certainly overseen by his staff rather than White, and may have been designed by them as well. Eric Heath, who left in mid-1928, went on to design the elaborate Spanish style Plaza Theatre, and George Newton Kenworthy, who left in 1929, went on to design a number of theatres and cinemas in the 1930s, notably the Cremorne Orpheum. Thorne suggests that the loss of these capable employees, coupled with his frequent absences (on his yacht and overseas), contributed to the complete collapse of his practice when the Great Depression hit in 1930.

== List of works ==
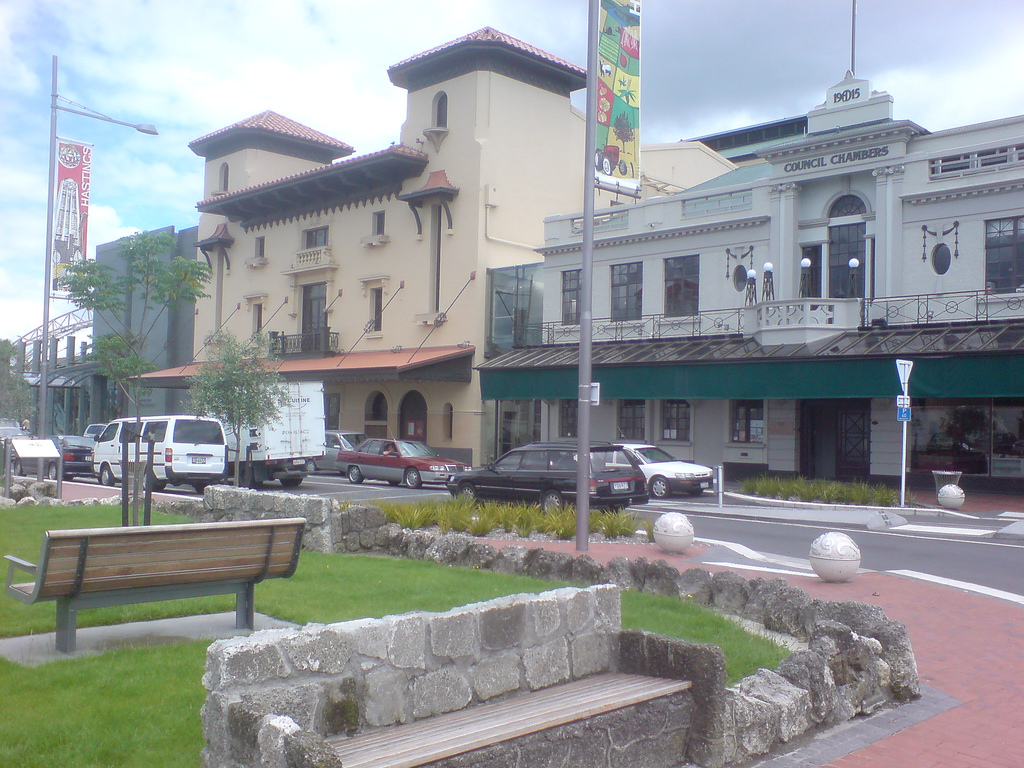
The Hastings Municipal Theatre designed by Henry Eli White in the Spanish Mission style. The theatre was opened in 1915 and is now known at the Hawke's Bay Opera House.

=== Theatres ===
- 1911 Theatre Royal, 118–122 Stafford Street, Timaru, New Zealand (new auditorium and backstage).
- 1912 His Majesty's, High Street, Blenheim, New Zealand (demolished 1970s)
- 1912 St. James Theatre, 77–87 Courtenay Place, Wellington, New Zealand.
- 1912 His Majesty's (later the Majestic), Victoria Avenue, Wanganui, New Zealand (demolished 1970s now Majestic Square).
- 1915 Tivoli Theatre and Roof Garden, Albert Street (now King George Square), Brisbane, Queensland (interior rebuilt 1927, building demolished 1965).
- 1915 Hastings Municipal Theatre (now Hawke's Bay Opera House), 106 Hastings Street, Hastings, New Zealand.
- 1916 Palace Theatre, 30 Bourke Street, Melbourne (new auditorium and lobbies for the 1912 Brennan's Amphitheatre). White redecorated and altered the boxes in 1923. Proscenium removed 1955, converted to nightclub 1980s, all decoration removed 2016.
- 1916 Everybody's Theatre, Gisborne, New Zealand (demolished).
- 1916 Grand Opera House (renamed Tivoli Theatre 1932), 329 Castlereagh Street, Sydney (interior rebuild of the Adelphi, demolished 1969).
- 1917 Majestic (renamed Elizabethan Theatre 1955), 1 Erskineville Road, Newtown, Sydney (destroyed by fire 1980).
- 1919 National (Amphi-)Theatre/ Fullers, 73 Castlereagh Street, Sydney (interior rebuild of National Amphitheatre, rebuilt Art Deco style 1934 and renamed Mayfair Theatre, demolished 1984).
- 1921 Theatre Royal, 100 King Street, Sydney (interior rebuild, demolished 1972).
- 1922 Princess Theatre, 163 Spring Street, Melbourne (new auditorium and rearranged lobbies).
- 1924 Athenaeum Theatre, Melbourne Athenaeum, 188 Collins Street, Melbourne (construction of theatre within existing hall).
- 1925 Wintergarden, East Street, Ipswich, Queensland (demolished 1979).
- 1925 Wintergarden, Alma Street, Rockhampton, Queensland (closed 1974, auditorium demolished c2005, rest demolished 2013).
- 1926 St James Theatre, Elizabeth Street, Sydney (demolished 1971).
- 1927 Star Theatre, Bronte Road, Bondi Junction, Sydney (demolished 1981)
- Theatre Royal, Main Street, Lithgow, NSW (extensive reconstruction) Became nightclub in 1991, building for sale in 2019.
- 1927 Wintergarden, Sturt Street, Townsville, Queensland (demolished 1991).
- 1928 Wintergarden, 622 New South Head Road, Rose Bay, Sydney (demolished 1987).
- 1928 St. James Theatre, Auckland (originally His Majesty's), 314 Queen Street, Auckland (closed since 2007).
- 1929 Newcastle Civic Theatre, 375 Hunter St, Newcastle, NSW.

=== Cinemas ===
- 1913 Alhambra (later Tivoli), 11 Karangahape Road, Auckland (demolished c1980).
- 1915 Majestic Theatre (later Odeon), Queen Street, Brisbane (demolished 1981).
- 1916 The Strand (later Mayfair, then Cinerama), Queen Street, Auckland (demolished 1984).
- 1916 Everybody's Theatre, Hastings Street, Napier, New Zealand (destroyed in 1931 earthquake).
- 1916 The Cosy, Queen Street, Masterton, New Zealand (demolished 1988).
- 1916 Grand Theatre, 250 Jackson Street, Petone, New Zealand (remodelled 1930s, now apartments)
- 1917 Strand Theatre (later the Plaza), Cathedral Square, Christchurch, New Zealand (demolished)
- 1922 Regent Theatre, 124 Little Malop Street, Geelong (only very altered exterior survives).
- 1927 Palais Theatre, Lower Esplanade, St Kilda, Melbourne.
- 1927 Capitol Theatre, Campbell Street, Haymarket, Sydney (interiors only, designed with US theatre architect John Eberson).
- 1929 State Theatre (designed with US theatre architect John Eberson, and includes the attached high rise State Shopping Block, now offices), 49 Market St, Sydney.

=== Other designs ===
- 1913 Wonderland Amusement Park, Dominion Exhibition, Auckland (demolished).
- 1925 Midland Hotel, 151 Lambton Quay, Wellington, New Zealand (demolished 1980s).
- 1925–29 Bunnerong 'A', Bunnerong Power Station, Matraville, NSW (demolished 1987).
- 1926, Law Court Chambers, 191 Queen Street, Melbourne (demolished)
- 1926 Fox Film Corporation Film Store, Goulbourne Street, Sydney (demolished)
- 1929 State Shopping Block attached to the State Theatre, 49 Market St, Sydney.
- 1929 Newcastle City Hall, 290 King St, Newcastle, NSW.
- 1929 St Ignatius College (east wing), Riverview, Lane Cove, Sydney.
- 1929 Hengrove Hall (medical suites), 193 Macquarie Street, Sydney.
- 1929 Stanton House offices, Pitt Street, Sydney (demolished)
- 1930 Chalfont Chambers, 142-44 Phillip Street, Sydney (demolished)
- 1930 St James Building office block, above the lobby of the earlier St James Theatre, Elizabeth Street, Sydney (demolished 1971).

== Gallery ==
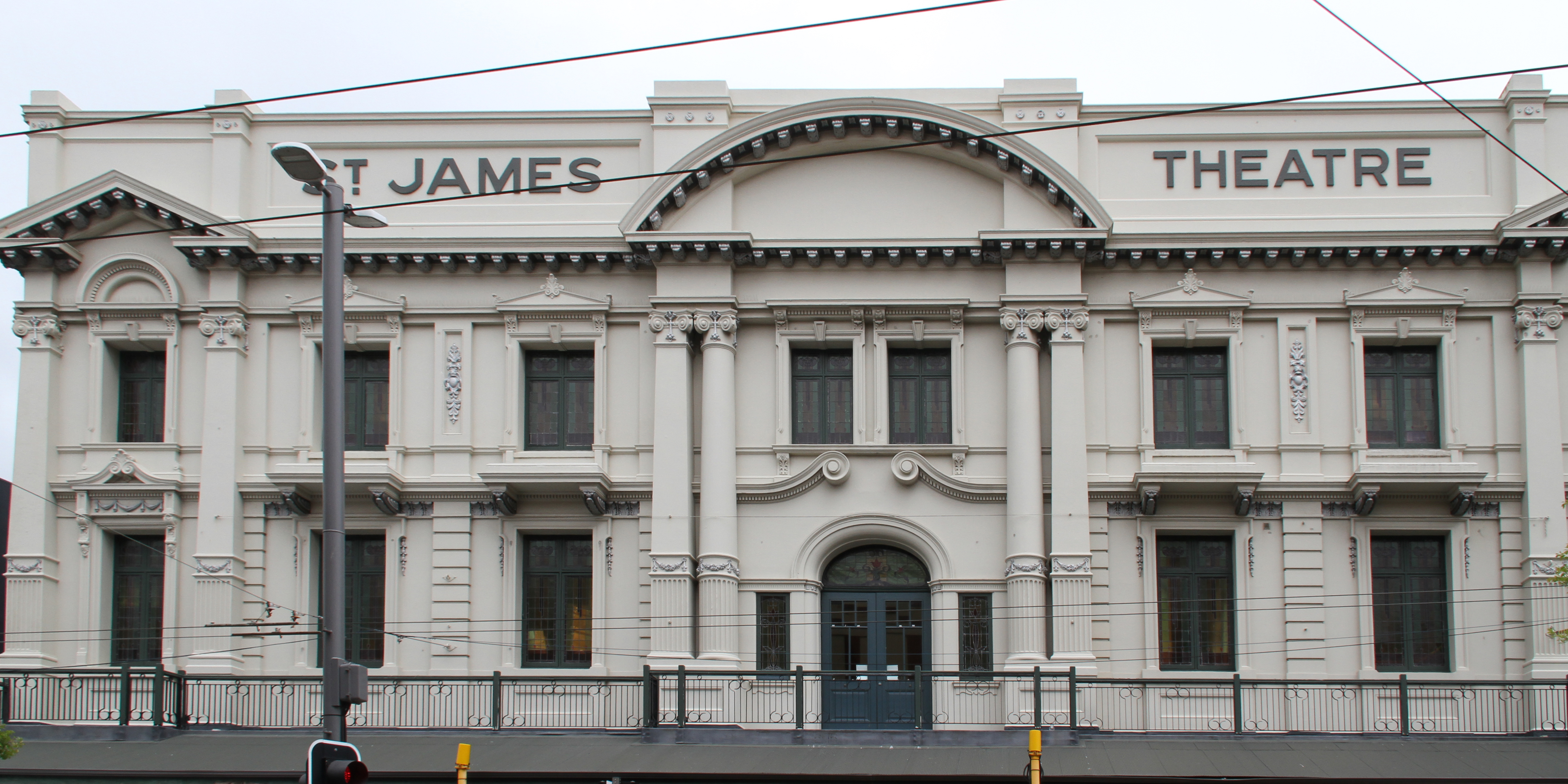
St James Theatre, Wellington, 1912

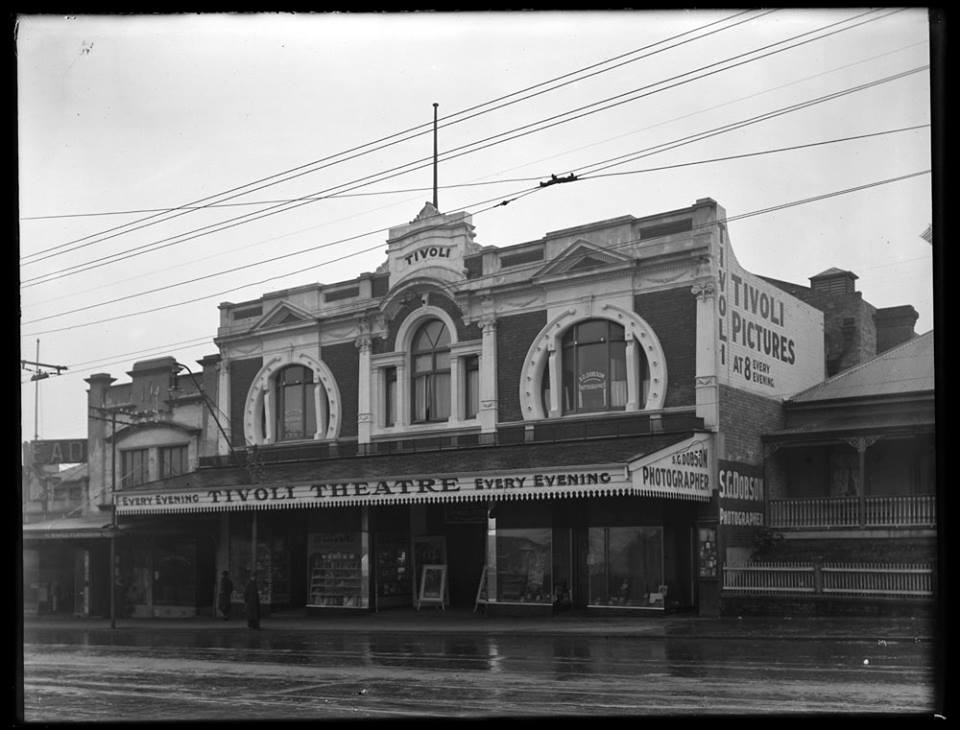
1913 Alhambra Karangahape Road Auckland as Tivoli in the 1930s

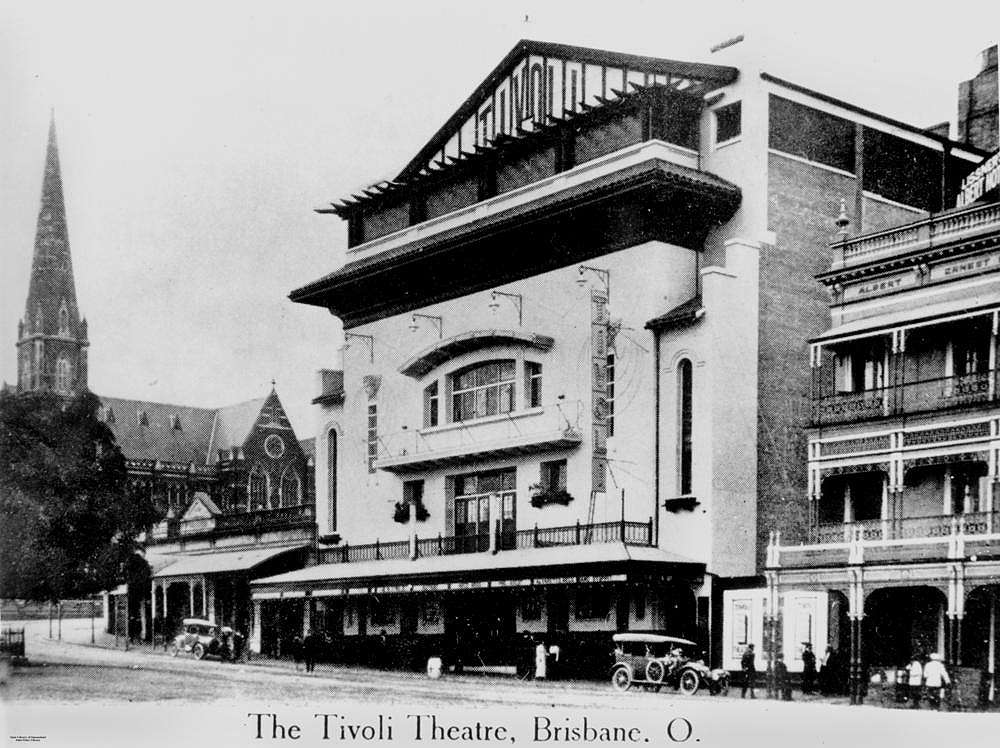
Tivoli Theatre, Brisbane, 1915

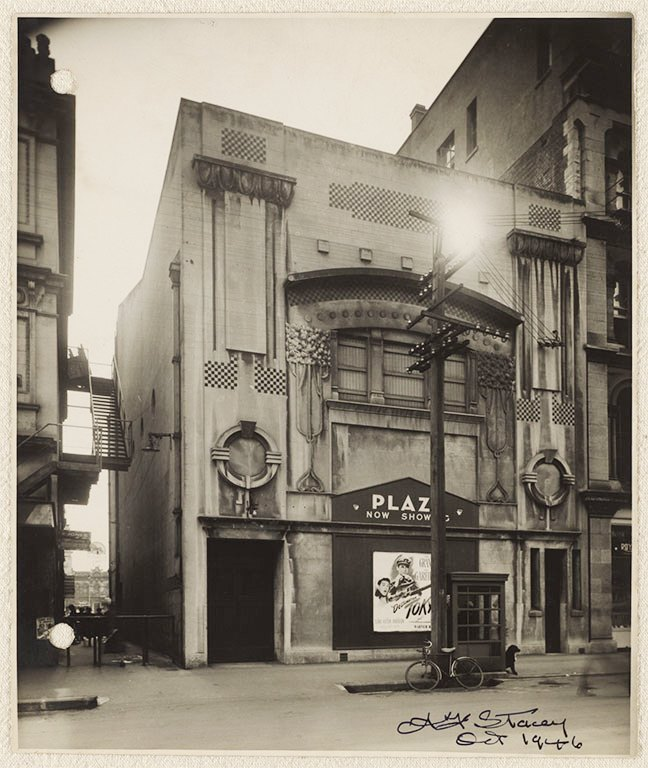
Stand (later Plaza), Christchurch (rear facade), 1917

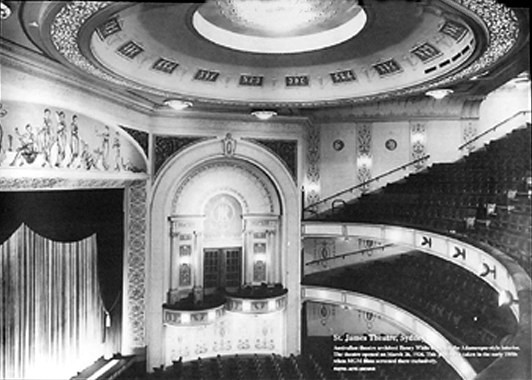
St James Theatre, Sydney, 1926

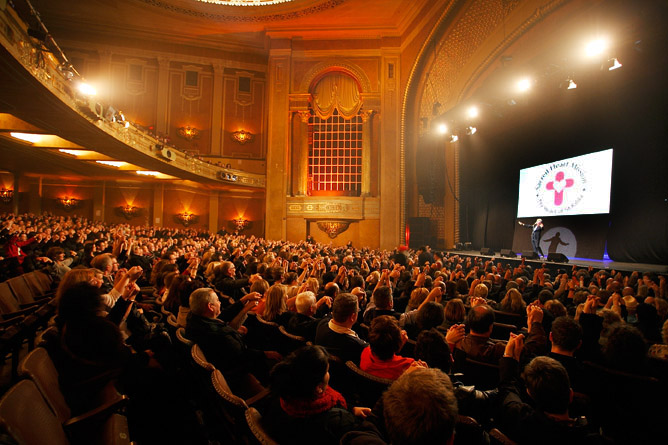
Palais Theatre, St Kilda, 1927

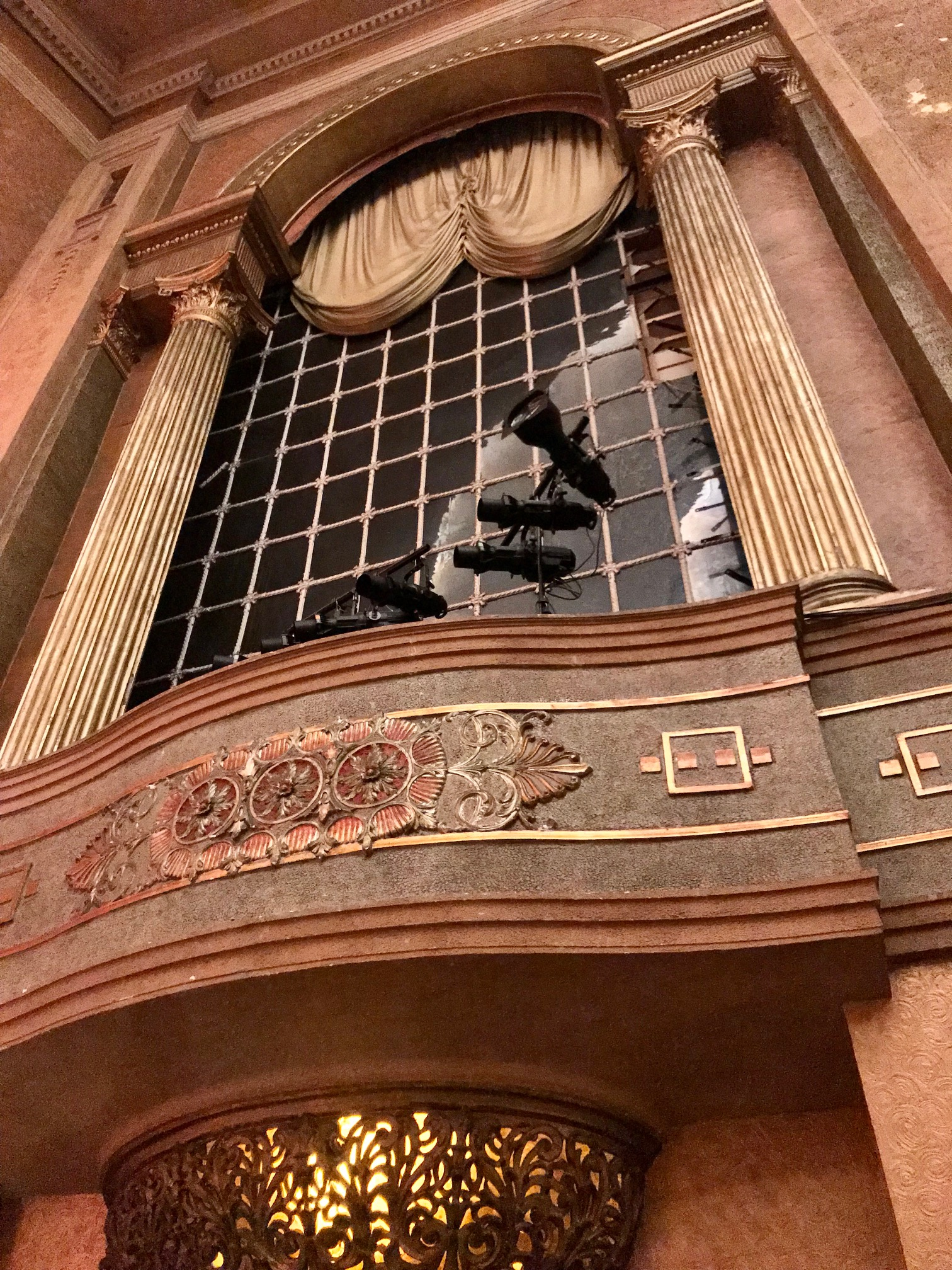
Palais Theatre StKilda 1927 - box

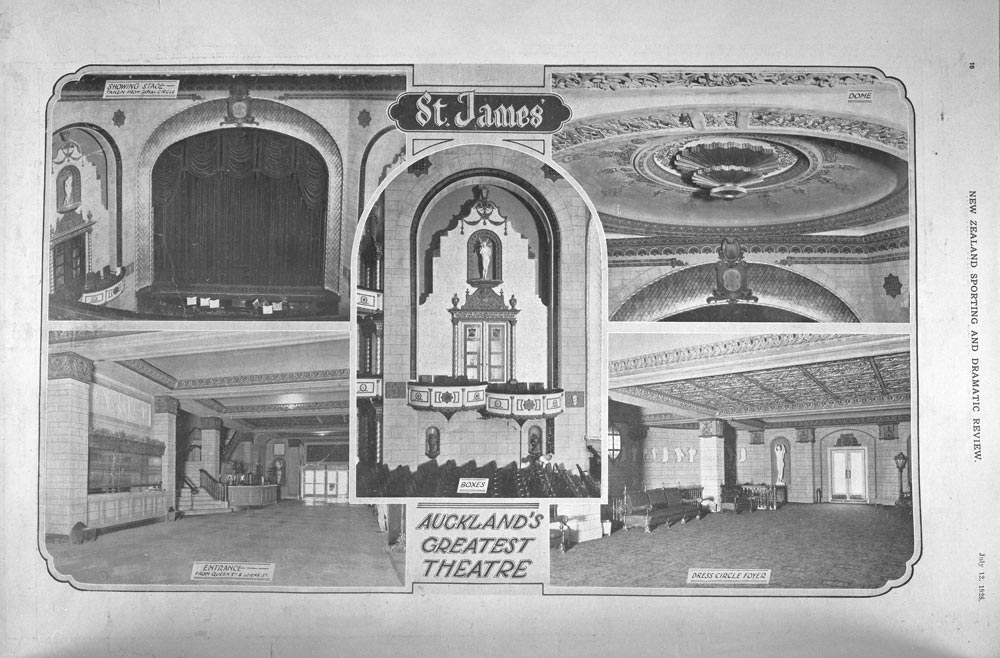
St James Auckland opening brochure 1928

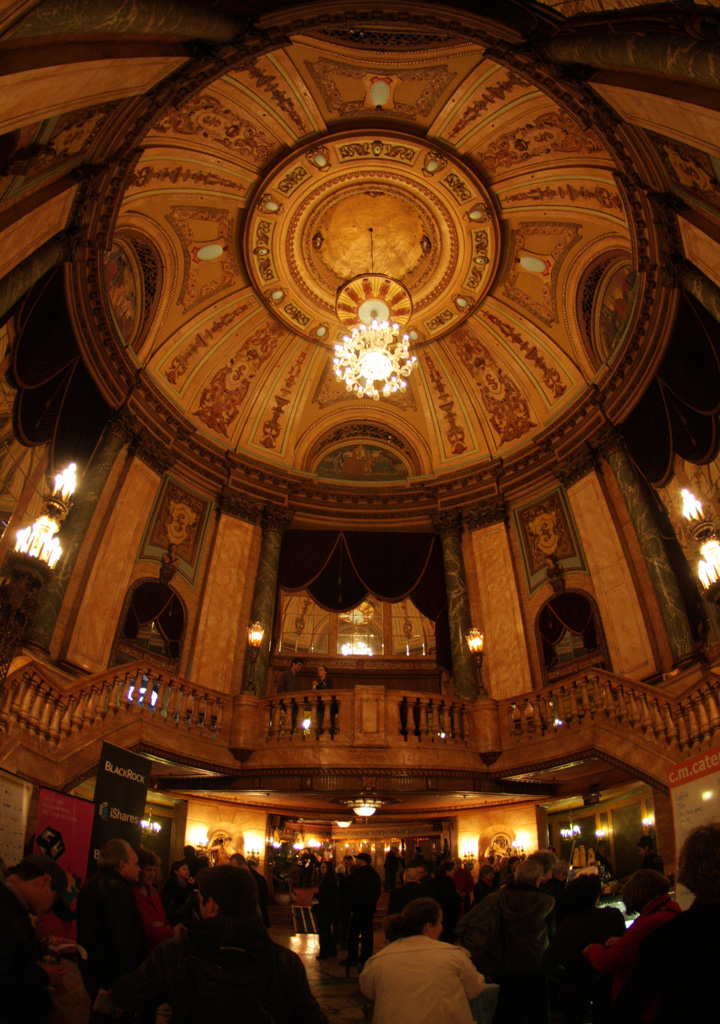
State Theatre, Sydney, 1928, lobby

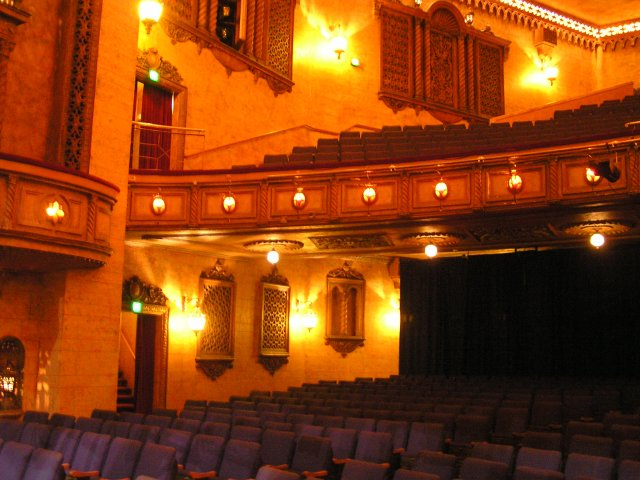
Civic Theatre, Newcastle, 1929

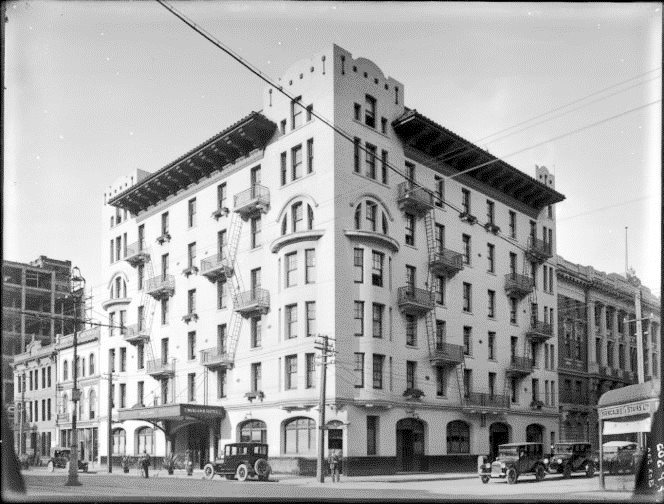
Midland Hotel, Wellington, 1925

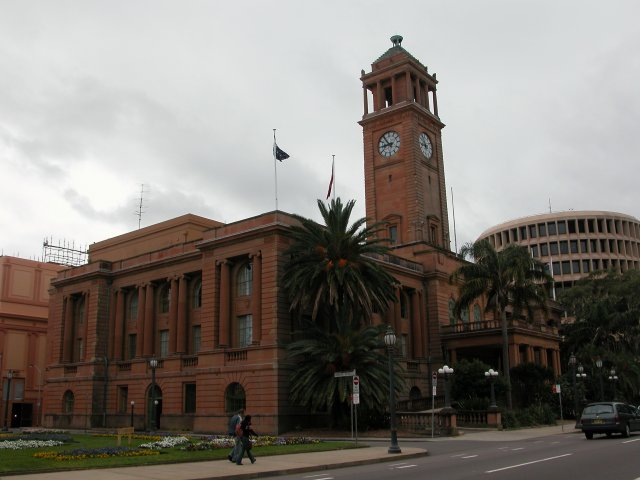
Newcastle City Hall, 1929
