= St. James Theatre, Wellington =

Theatre and former cinema in Wellington, New Zealand

St. James Theatre
- His Majesty's Theatre (1912–1929); Westpac St. James Theatre (1997–2007)
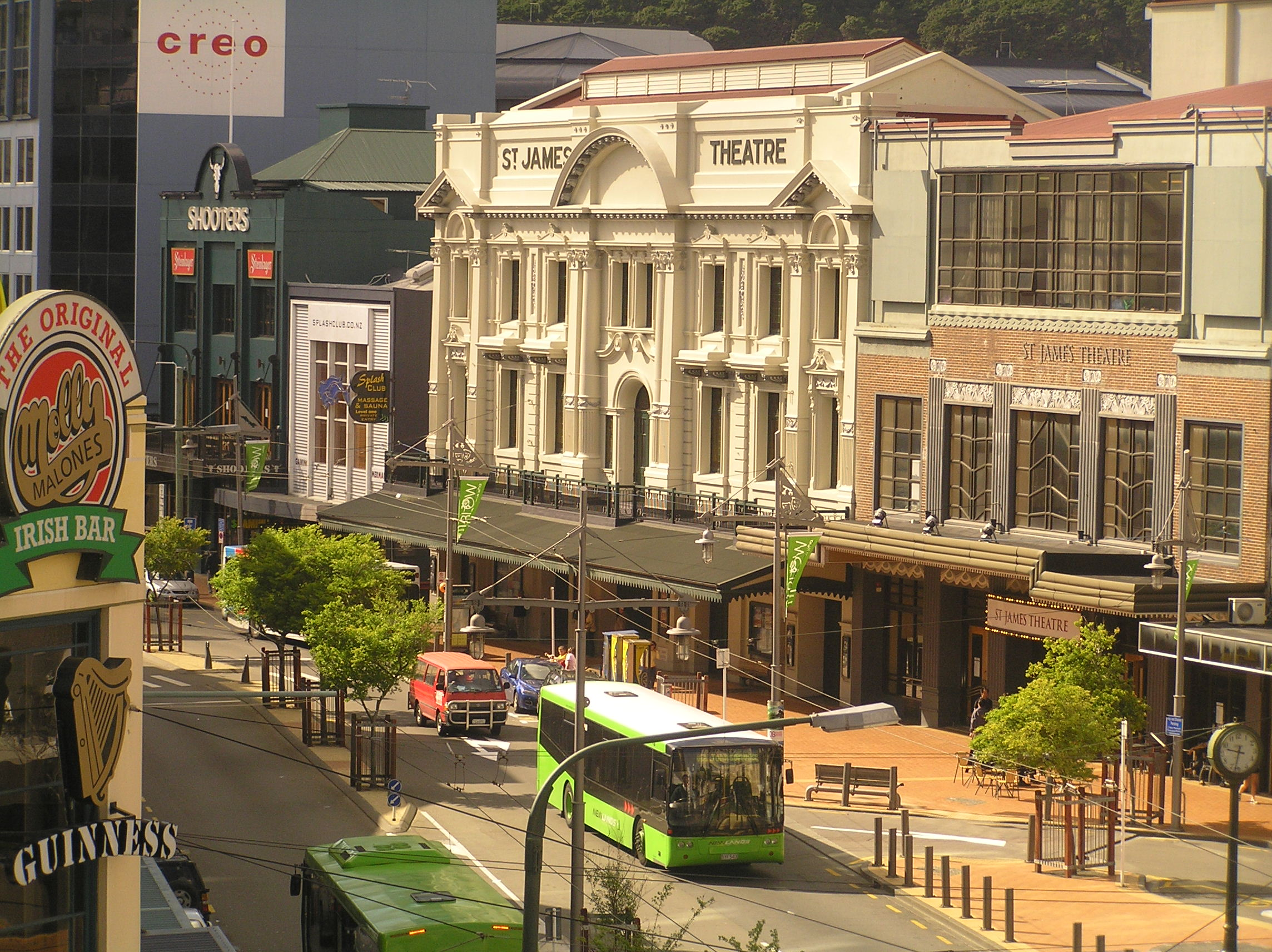
- St. James Theatre in November 2007
- Interactive map of St. James Theatre
- Address: 77–87 Courtenay Place; Wellington; New Zealand
- Coordinates: 41°17′36″S 174°46′48″E
- Capacity: seats 1,550, has space for a cocktail function of 500 and hospitality areas for banquets of up to 400.

Construction
- Opened: 1912
- Architect: Henry Eli White

Website
- www.wellingtonnz.com/venues-wellington/our-venues/st-james-theatre

Heritage New Zealand – Category 1
- Designated: 27 June 1985
- Reference no.: 3639

The St. James Theatre (built as His Majesty's Theatre, previously Westpac St. James Theatre 1997–2007, often known as simply "The St. James") is a large proscenium stage theatre in central Wellington, New Zealand, and home to the Royal New Zealand Ballet. The building was designed in 1912 by New Zealand-born theatre designer Henry Eli White. It is located on Courtenay Place, the main street of Wellington's entertainment district, opposite the Reading Cinema complex.

The building is classified as a Category 1 Historic Place (places of "special or outstanding historical or cultural heritage significance or value") by Heritage New Zealand.

== History ==
The St. James has had a long history, with its success in its early years, a near demolition in the 1980s and to its return to the city's cultural light in the late 1990s.

The theatre's land had been used as a church and volunteer hall prior to it being bought by the famous entertainer John Fuller on 23 December 1899. The St. James was made famous by Fuller, who had also built over 60 other theatres in New Zealand. He revamped the hall in 1903 and named it "His Majesty's Theatre", or nicknamed "Fuller's". During its use, the hall was host to pantomimes and a Cleopatra act, which involved the first and last import of snakes into New Zealand. However, opera of any kind was seldom allowed by Fuller, who usually directed any opera show to Wellington's Opera House down the road. Fuller used the old hall until November 1911, when it was eventually declared a fire hazard and demolished.

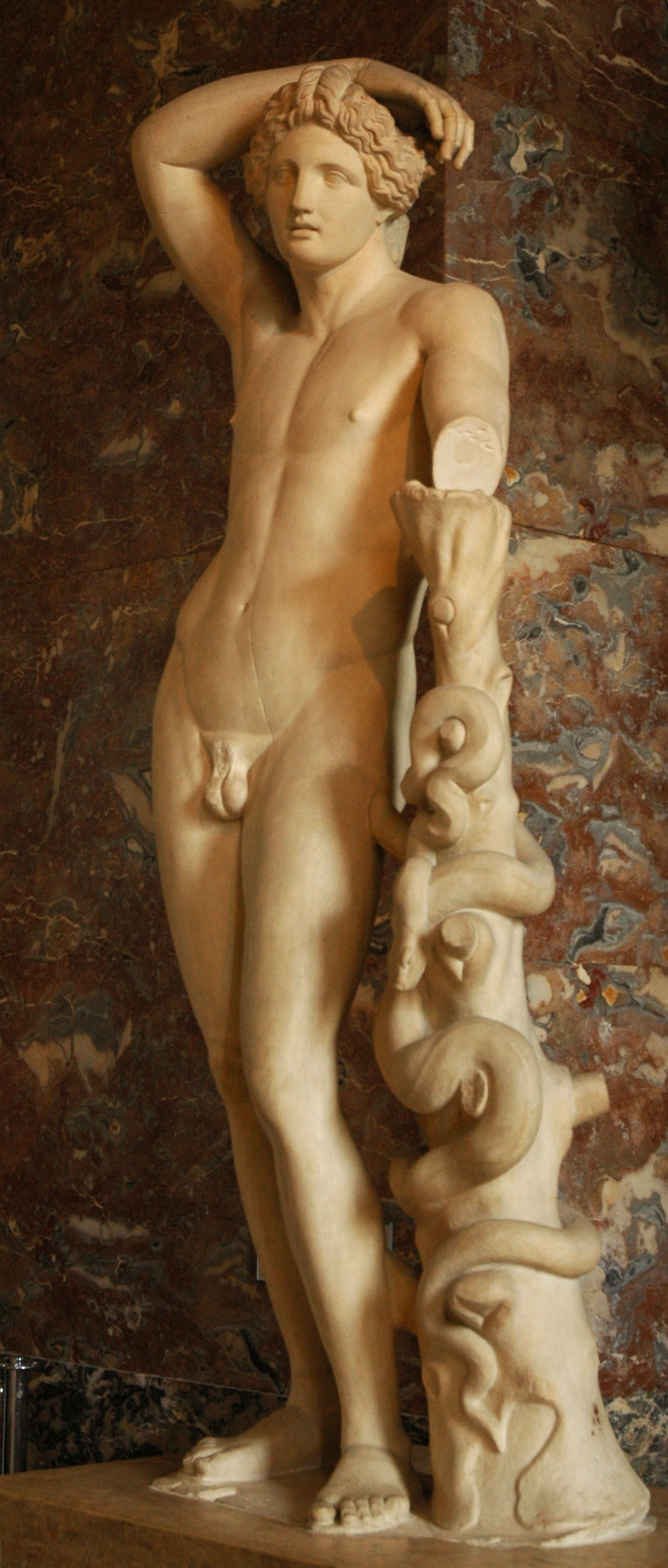
Statue of Apollo, similar to the sculptures presented in the St. James.

After this demolition, Fuller vowed the new theatre he was going to build would be the best in New Zealand. Fuller enlisted the help of Henry Eli White, who had already designed other theatres around the country for Fuller. White, fresh from building theatres in Timaru and Auckland, set out to plan the St. James. The St. James was the first entirely steel frame and reinforced concrete theatre in the world and plans made sure over 650 people could escape the auditorium in the event of a fire. Pillars in the auditorium were also kept at a minimum to allow perfect viewing, and seating was arranged in the arc of a circle to view the stage. The St. James was then adorned with marble pieces, carved face masks and cherubs to be placed on the ceiling and coloured glass. The plaster work was made by William Leslie Morison, who reinforced the lime plaster with cow hair. Morison used his grandson as a model for the plaster cherubs and modelled the full figured seen near the stage after Bacchus and Apollo. The wooden floors of the St. James were made of rimu and jarrah, along with tōtara for window frames and deal for doors. After the plans had been set, construction began on the theatre in March 1912. To speed progress, White himself designed two electric cranes to lift the in excess of 500 tonnes of steel. In all, the St. James cost £32,000 to build and took 9 months to build.

The theatre was officially opened 8pm on Boxing Day, 1912, by the Wellington Mayor, David McLaren. During the new theatre's first months, it was used primarily to play silent movies. The St. James was changed nine months later to present live performances. However, in 1930, after 17 years, it was again converted back to playing both movies and occasional live performances. This was after the St. James's lifelong opposition, the Opera House, began screening movies. After this change to the "talking films" or "flicks", on 3 May 1930, His Majesty's was closed and reopened as the St. James Theatre. Over the years, the St. James was slowly brought back to showing live performances. Many shows were performed at the venue; everything from Shakespeare, to minstrel acts to ballet. After Fuller died, the St. James passed through numerous owners.

=== Decline and restoration ===
After its enormous success over the past decades, in the 1970s, the St. James fell into decline and was effectively closed down. Shows began performing at the Opera House and newer venues such as the Michael Fowler Centre, Downstage and the restored town hall. Rumours of ghosts haunting upper seat levels didn't help the theatre's reputation either and soon the theatre was forgotten. On 7 May 1987, the St. James played its last movie, 'Wanted: Dead or Alive', to a small group.

Months prior to this last showing a "Save the St James" campaign had been launched by a group including Peter Harcourt, Grant Sheehan, Ann Pacey, Rex McNichols and John Saker, They, along with family members, had lobbied, and pamphletted patrons to that end and continued in their endeavours.

The site was then declared unpractical and was abandoned.

The theatre was nearly demolished in the 1980s and '90s after the owners placed a destruction order on the plot. However, due to the efforts of an objecting group, the St. James was eventually spared and restored to its former glory. The alarm had been risen after a photographer, Grant Sheehan, was told by the theatre's curator that the St. James was set to be demolished by the Chase Corporation. For nearly a decade, a wrecking ball sat poised above the theatre, but it was never used after the owners were finally persuaded to save the property. The company looking to build on the site, Chase, were still angered by the result, so a trade off was made by the committee vouching for the St. James; Chase would be allowed to build a tower in Wellington exceeding current height restrictions if the committee could save the theatre. The offer was highly contested, with some companies near the new tower protesting at its aimed size. The Opera House objected to the St. James's restoration, saying that the city would not be able to sustain two theatres.

In any case, the council rejected the committee's proposal to allow Chase to build higher. Chase retaliated and immediately asked the council for a demolition permit. However, the council slowed progress on getting the report so the Historic Places Trust could add the St. James to its list. The plan succeeded and a limited protection order was placed over the St. James. Now Chase could only demolish the site with consent from the Trust. Knowing that the protection order would only last for a limited time (in fact only until 31 March 1988), there was a frantic rush to get Chase to sell the building to the council so they could restore it. Fundraising events were commonplace during this time, most asking for donations towards the "Save the St. James fund". Eventually, after hard negotiations the plan to sell and restore the theatre went ahead, due to the theatre's good aspects and proximity to the city's hot-spots. Owing to the increasing number of theatre-going public, the Opera House would not be able to support the demand, especially when the Wellington Festival of the Arts arrived. The council finally agreed to allow Chase to plan its tower in Willis Street in return for $7 million to refurbish the theatre; the other option that was not taken was for the government to raise $18 million to purchase and restore the building.

However, once again bad luck fell upon the deal, when the financial crash of 1987 struck most companies in New Zealand, including Chase. The building and deal was abandoned once again and time passed with no results. Chase had not secured a tenant for its new tower and the council began to doubt whether it should spend millions on a single theatre. After the finish line for the protection order over the St. James ended, Chase gave their word that the theatre would not be demolished. Eventually, Chase went into liquidation and all its properties were put up for sale. The St. James was put on the market for $7 million, double what Chase had paid for it. The council declined and over the months, the price fell dramatically as Chase saw an absence of offers. The price fell to below what even Chase had paid for the theatre.

The council still declined and a massive campaign to save the theatre arose. Eventually on 22 September 1993, the council sought to buy the property and succeeded with their offer of $550,000. The council handed the St. James over to a new St. James Theatre Charitable Trust. Soon it was booked out and live performances were shown frequently. An $18.5 million restoration plan was set out in 1995. However, this was considered worth the risk, as it was estimated the theatre would bring over $3.6 million into the local economy. In 1996, the council gave a $10.7 million contribution towards the restoration plan, in addition to $2.4 million from a Wellington Community Trust grant, $3.5 million from the Lottery Board and over $1 million in donation from the public. The total of around $17.7 million allowed the St. James Trust to confirm they would start restoring the theatre.

Restoration work finished in late 1997, and most of the theatre's aspects were modified. The theatre was fitted with an orchestra pit, which can be raised and lowered below the stage's level as needed. A new café was opened on the theatre's ground floor called "The Jimmy" after the nickname commonly given to the theatre by theatre staff and theatre-going locals.

=== Ghosts ===
The theatre has its share of ghost folklore. The ghost most commonly recounted is that of Yuri, a Russian performer who supposedly fell to his death from the flies high above the stage, although in another version he was pushed by another performer called Pasha. According to witnesses Yuri interferes with the house lights, especially after cleaners have left for the night, and a projectionist claimed Yuri twice saved his life by pushing him out of harm's way. Other ghost stories refer to the "Wailing Woman", supposedly the ghost of an actress who committed suicide after she was booed off the stage at her comeback performance, a boys choir that was lost at sea, and Stan Andrews, a former manager who died in 1965.

In 2005 the St James Theatre was featured in an episode of the New Zealand television show Ghost Hunt. Three investigators captured allegedly "paranormal" photographs and numerous "orbs" inside the building, and the elevator began to malfunction during filming, a commonly reported occurrence when moving instruments between the orchestra pit and the loading bay.

=== Recent developments ===
Australia and New Zealand bank Westpac held naming rights to the theatre and the Wellington Regional Stadium until 2007, when a face-lift of the theatre's facade included removing the Westpac name from the brickwork frontage. In July 2011 Positively Wellington Venues, an integration between the Wellington Convention Centre and the St James Theatre Trust, began managing the theatre along with five other Wellington venues.

Engineering assessments after the 2013 Seddon earthquake led the building to be declared earthquake-prone (yellow-stickered) in 2015, as it was measured to be 20-30 percent of the building standards at the time. The Jimmy café closed in 2016 and was replaced by a Mojo café. The 2016 Kaikōura earthquake that damaged several buildings in Wellington brought forward earthquake strengthening plans in the city, and work began on the theatre in April 2018. The theatre reopened in June 2022.

== Events held ==
The St. James holds many shows, usually hosts a large portion of the New Zealand International Arts Festival, and is the home of the Royal New Zealand Ballet. Art shows are often held on its second floor, as well as conferences.

In 2017, TEDxWellington hosted 13 speakers and 1,000 delegates at the St. James Theatre on Courtenay Place.

Interior views

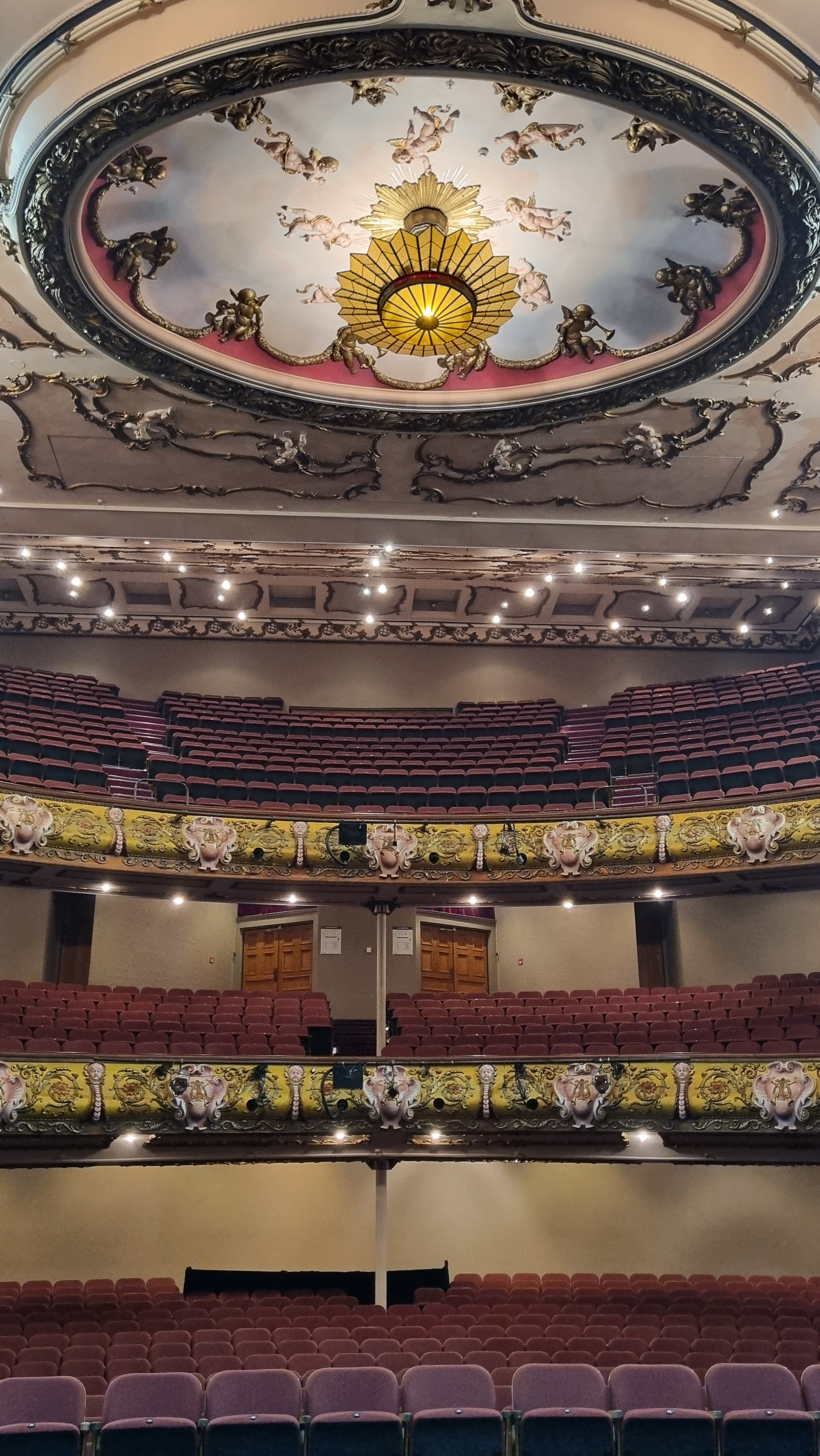
View from the stage

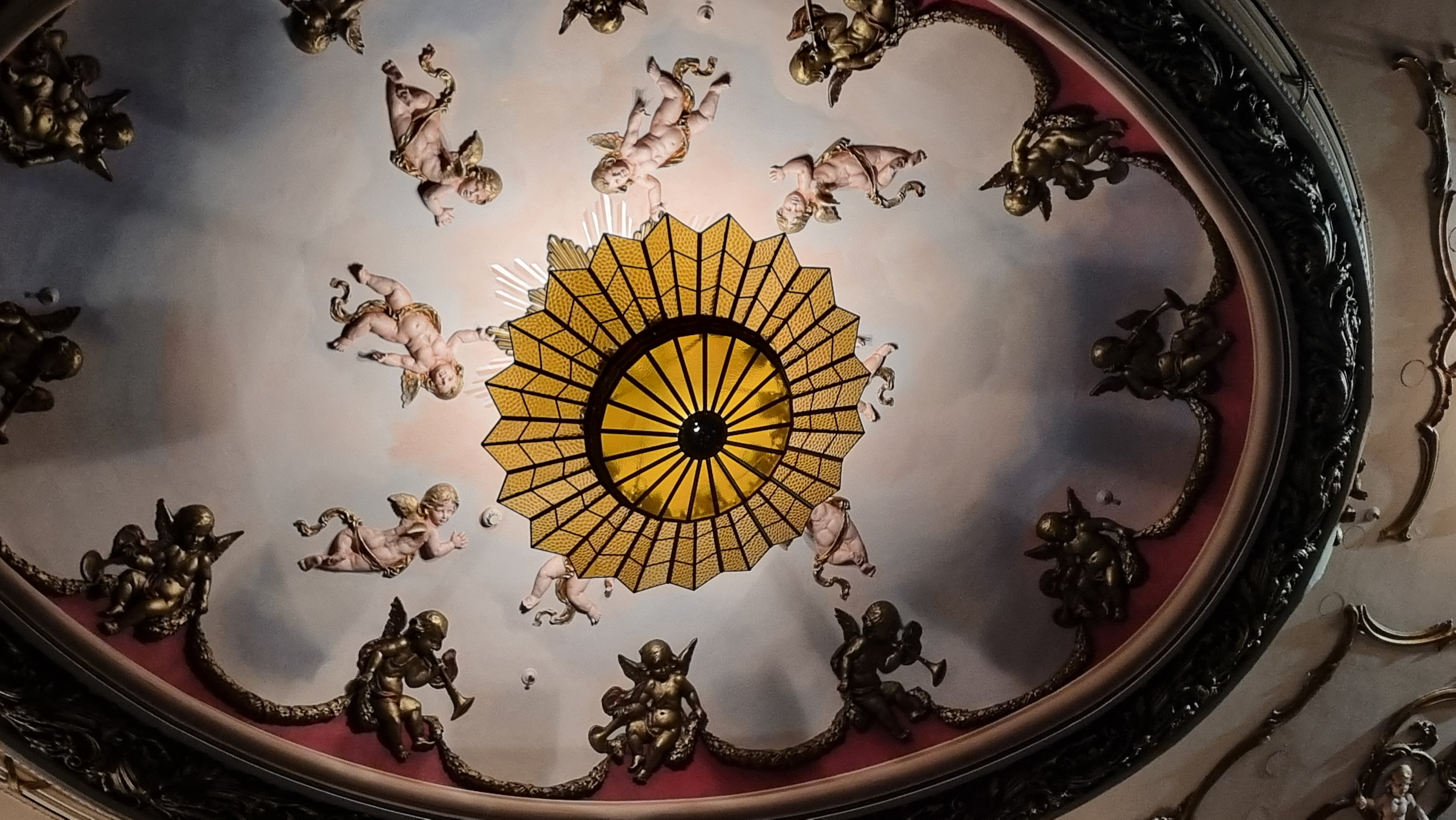
Central ceiling light

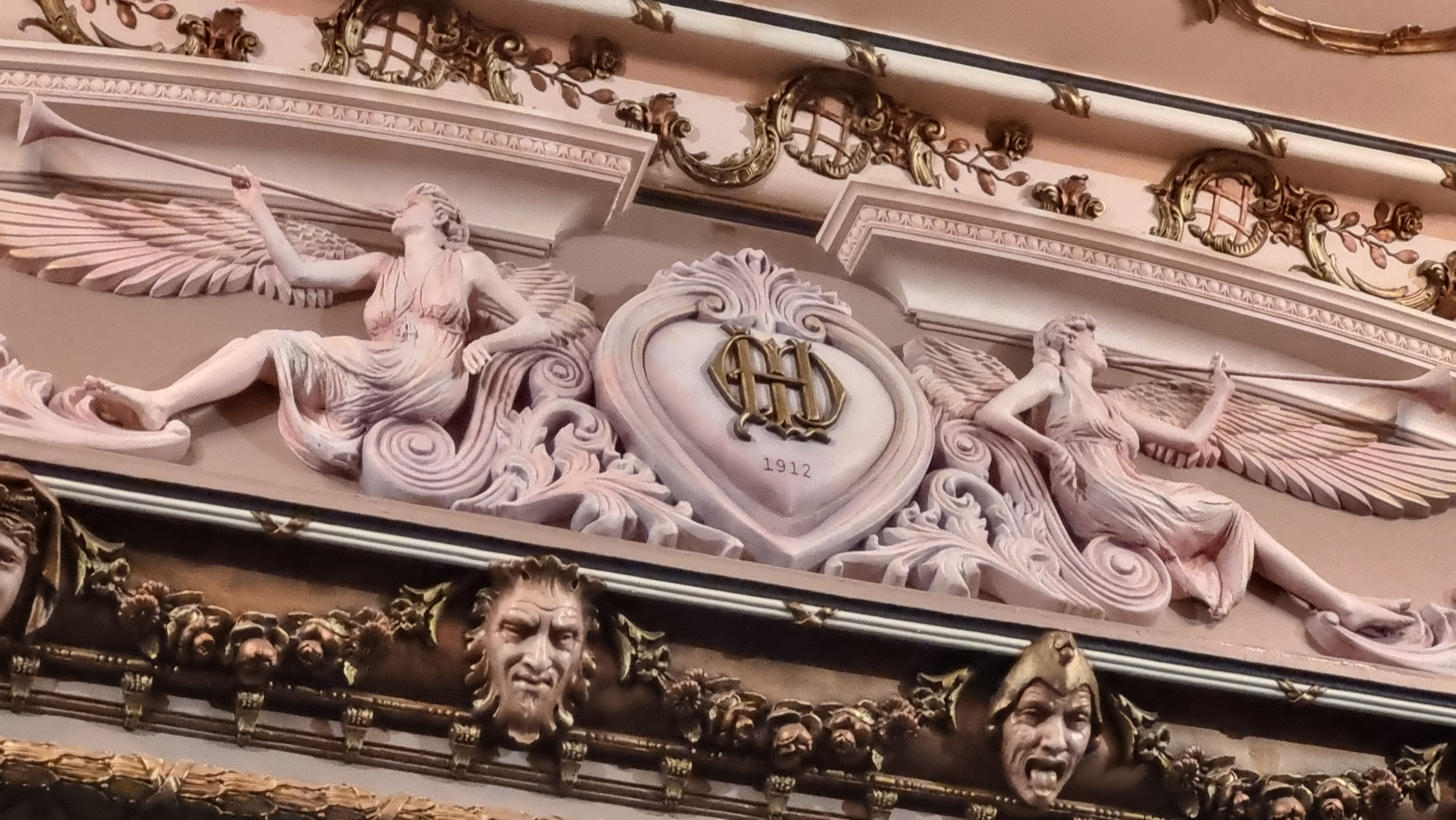
Decoration above the proscenium arch

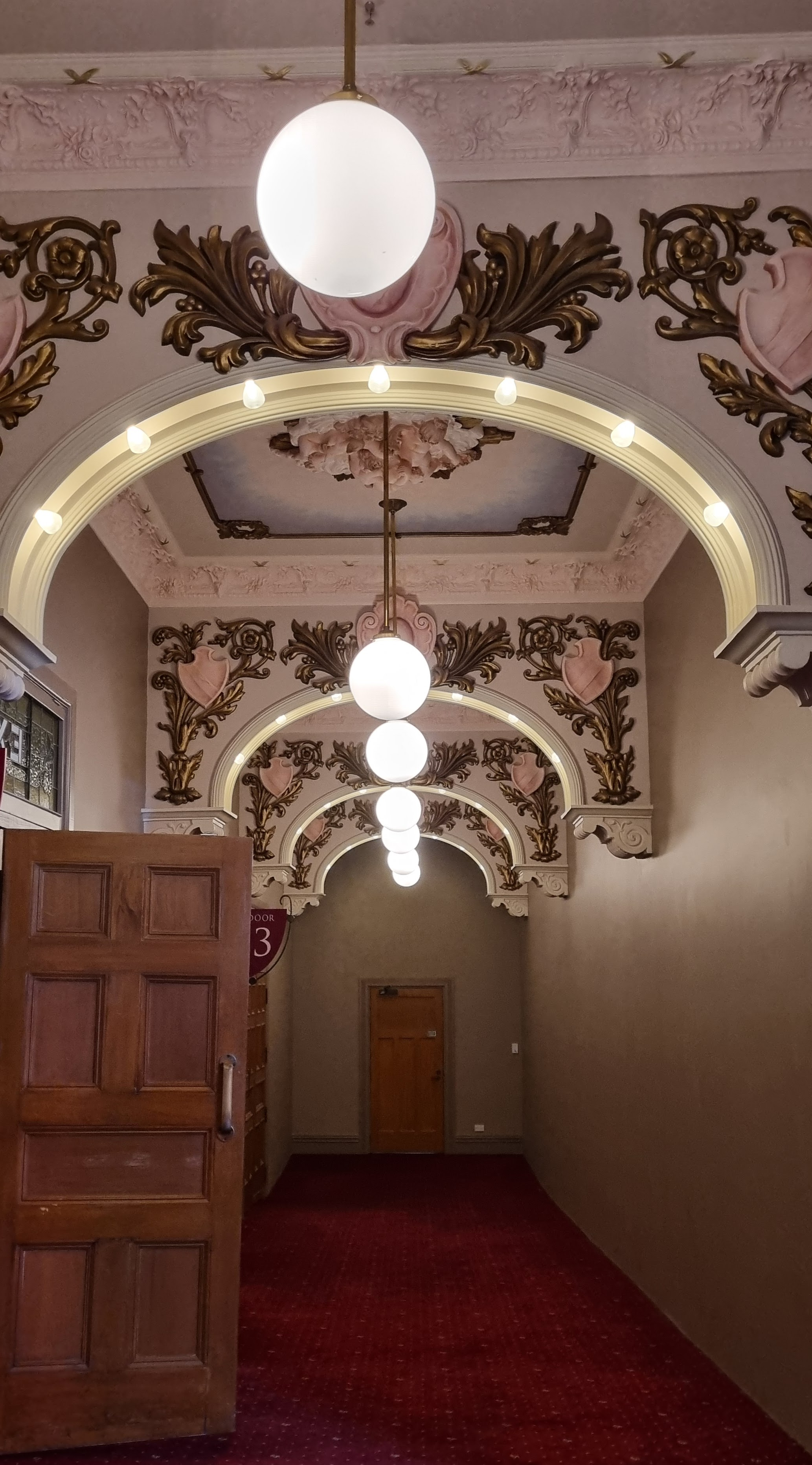
Hallway

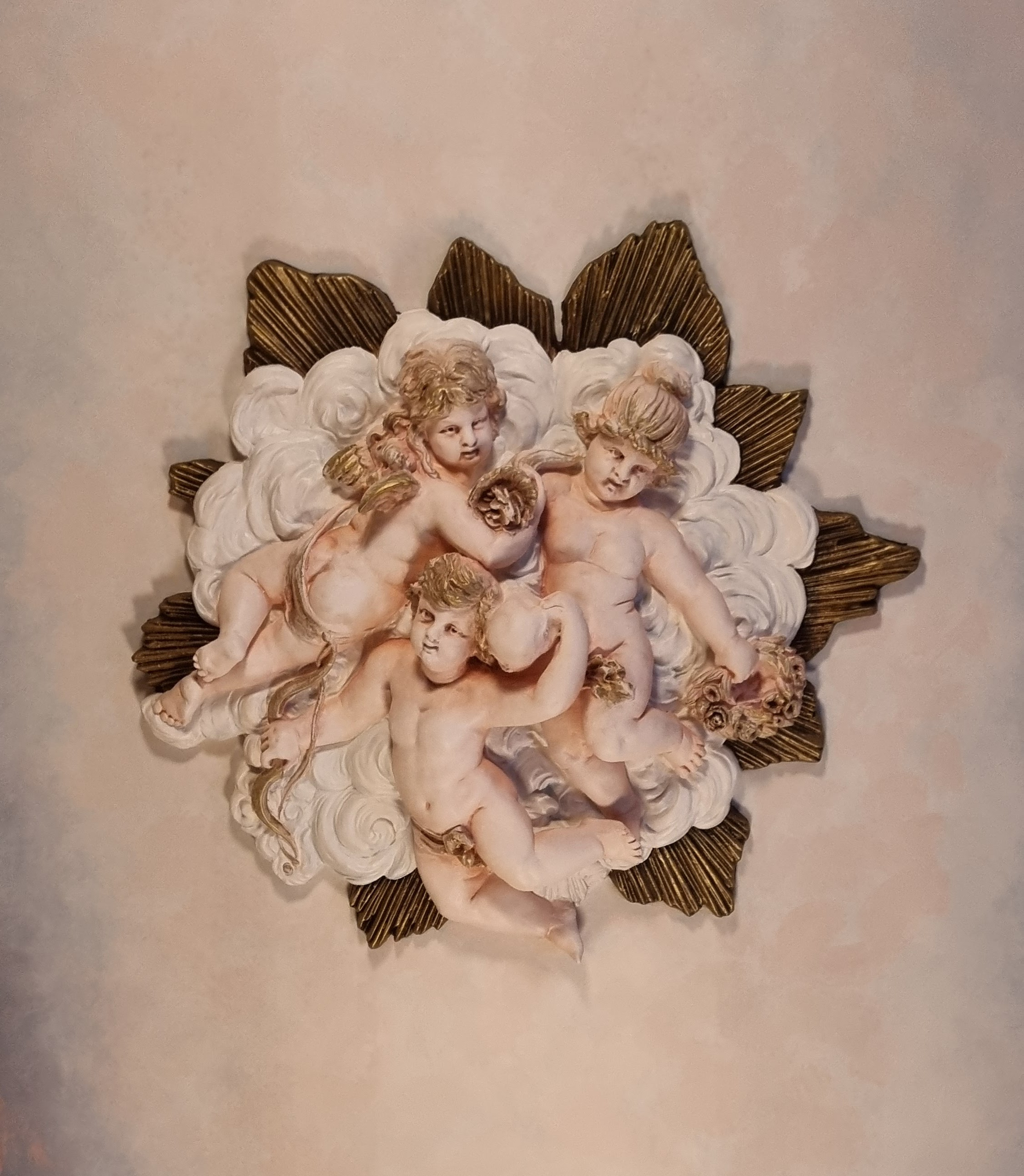
Ceiling decoration

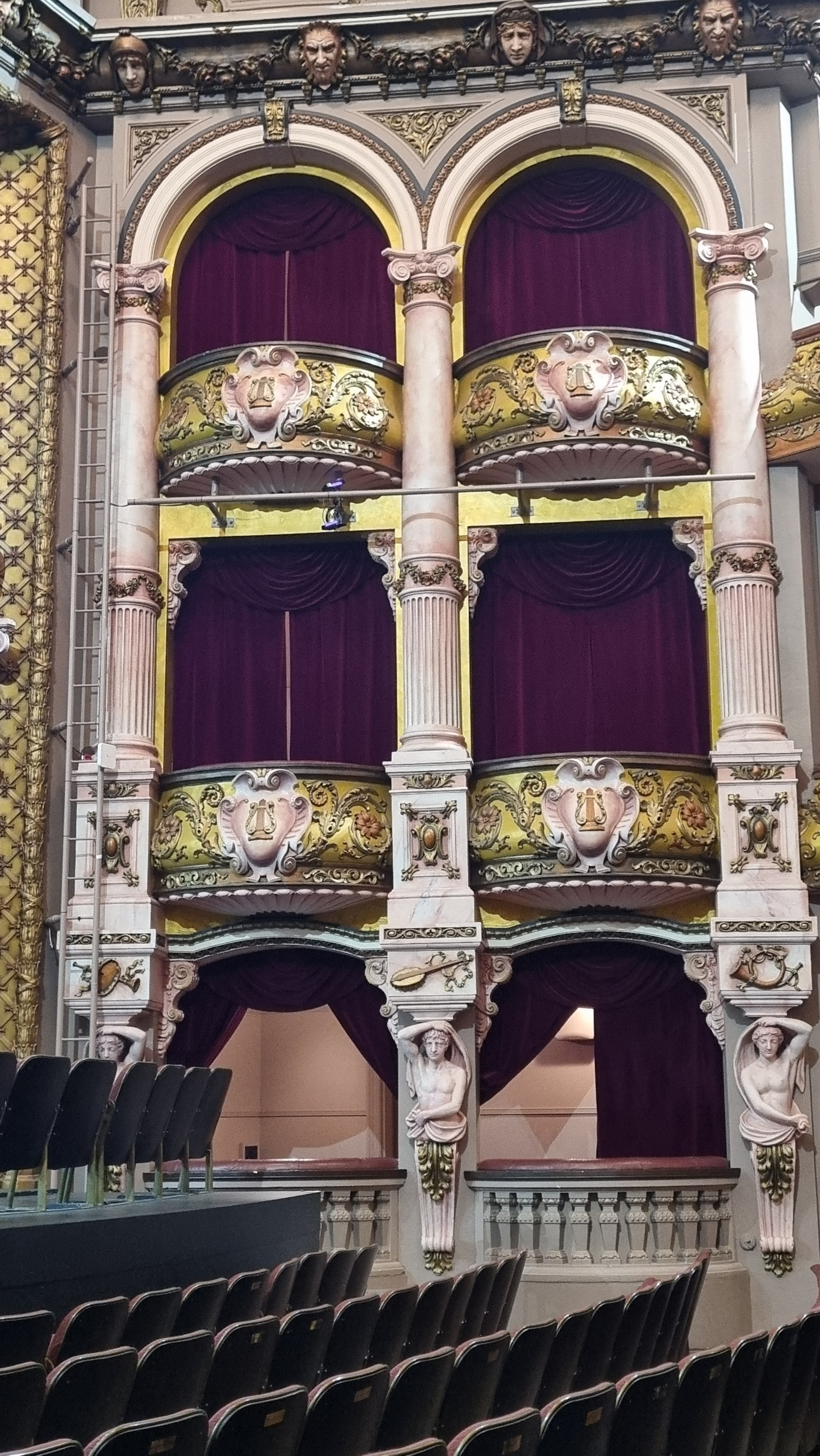
Boxes
