= Palais Theatre =

Historic picture palace in Melbourne, Australia

Coordinates: 37°52′02″S 144°58′34″E

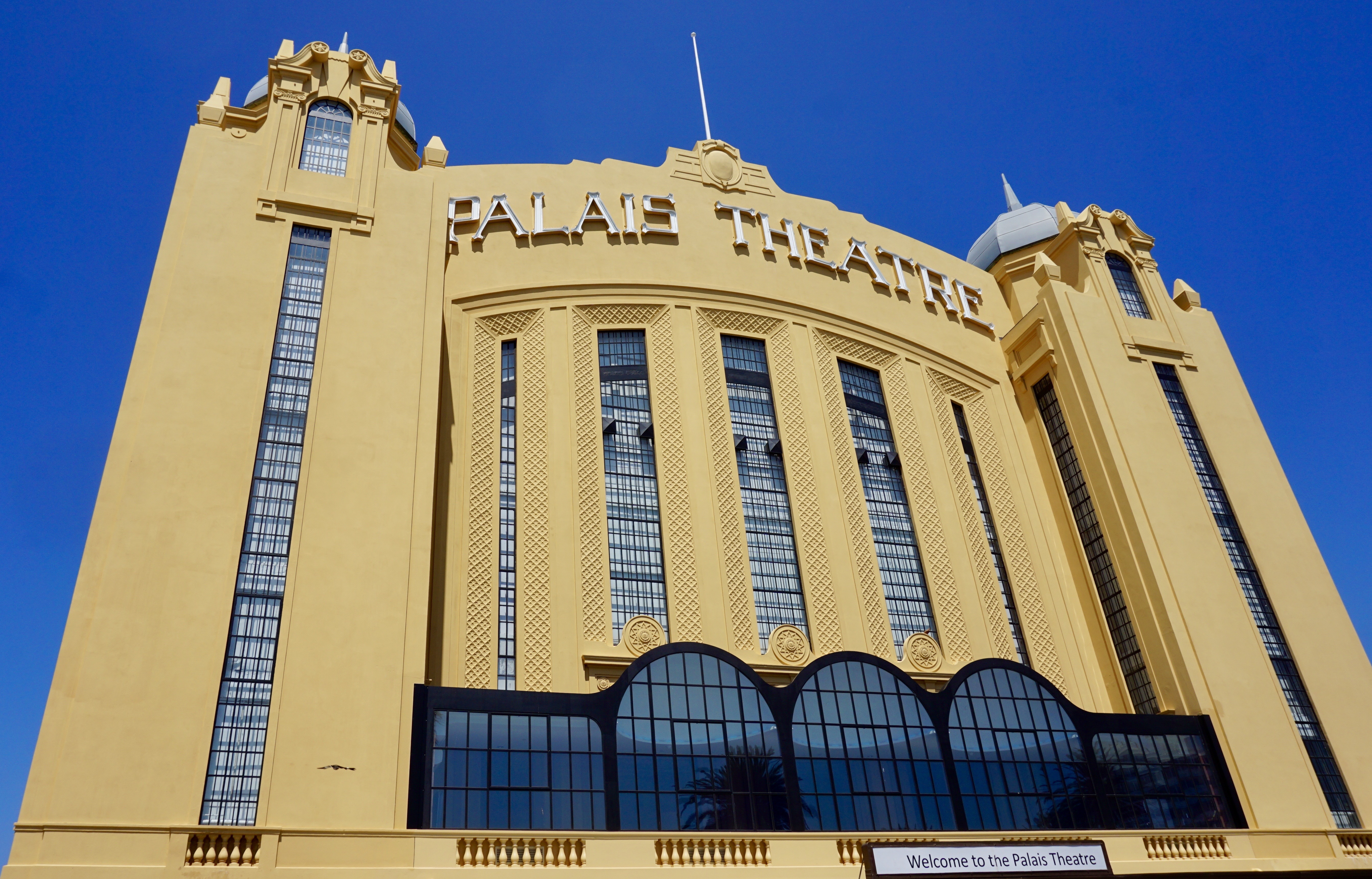
- Palais Theatre, St Kilda, 2016
- Interactive map of Palais Theatre
- Former names: Palais Pictures (1927–57)
- Address: Lower Esplanade; St Kilda, Victoria 3182; Australia
- Location: Greater Melbourne
- Operator: Live Nation Australia
- Capacity: 2,896

Construction
- Opened: 1927
- Renovated: 1952, 2007–16
- Architect: Henry Eli White

Website
- palaistheatre.com.au

The Palais Theatre, formerly known as Palais Pictures, is a historic picture palace located in St Kilda, an inner suburb of Melbourne, Victoria, Australia. With a capacity of nearly 3,000 people, it is the largest seated theatre in Australia..

Replacing an earlier cinema of the same name destroyed in a fire, the new theatre, designed by Henry Eli White, opened in 1927. Sitting adjacent to Luna Park, it helped to establish the St Kilda beach foreshore as an entertainment precinct, and remains an iconic landmark in the area. From the 1950s, it became primarily a live entertainment venue, and hosting ballet performances, operas, stand-up comedy shows and big name acts.

The Palais is included on the Victorian Heritage Register, and in 2015, it was inducted into the Music Victoria Hall of Fame.

== History ==
The Palais Theatre was developed by the Phillips brothers (Leon, Herman and Harold), who hailed from Spokane, Washington. Their first venture here, with fellow American showman James Dixon Williams, was Luna Park, which opened on the St Kilda foreshore in 1912. Williams left the partnership and returned to the United States in about 1913, leaving the Phillips brothers to expand their entertainment business.

The Phillips' next ventures were a series of dance halls and picture theatres on the 'triangle site', across a small road from Luna Park. They began in 1913 with the first Palais de Danse, on the site of the current Palais Theatre. In 1915, this building was converted into Palais Pictures. In 1919, an arched-truss steel-framed structure that was to be a new Palais Pictures was built over the old Palais, which was then dismantled and relocated next door, to the north, becoming a dance hall again, the twin-towered arched-roofed Palais de Danse. In 1922 the interior of the Palais de Danse was remodelled to a design by the architect Walter Burley Griffin. In 1925, Griffin was again employed to design a substantial remodelling of the Palais Pictures next door; work was nearly complete in 1926 when a fire destroyed the whole building. The Phillips brothers then commissioned a new architect, theatre specialist Henry Eli White, to build a larger, grander theatre.

This new theatre, with the largest seating capacity outside the main central city theatres, was officially opened by the Mayor of St Kilda on 12 November 1927. The next night the first films screened were Across the Pacific, starring Monte Blue, and Rough House Rosie, starring Clara Bow, with interval entertainment provided by Harry Jacobs and his orchestra.

When the last of the Phillips brothers died in 1957, the Palais, the Palais de Danse and Luna Park passed to local entrepreneurs. A brass plaque, still in place on the second level of the Palais, bears a tribute to Leon Phillips from members of the American community of Victoria. The theatre, which had operated primarily as a cinema until the 1950s, became increasingly popular as a live performance venue, hosting top overseas stars such as Johnnie Ray, Bob Hope, the Rolling Stones, Tom Jones and many others. At some point in the 1950s, the name was changed from Palais Pictures to Palais Theatre, reflecting its new role, and the neon sign on the front was changed accordingly.

In the 1960s and '70s, the Palais hosted live acts, films, opera and ballet. The Bolshoi Theatre, the Kirov Ballet and the Stars of World Ballet performed, and it was the Melbourne venue for The Australian Ballet, who premiered Anne Woolliams' production of Swan Lake on 19 October 1977, and its first commissioned Nutcracker choreographed by Leonid Kozlov and Valentina Kozlova on 8 October 1982. The Melbourne Film Festival was based at the Palais from 1962 until 1982. Jesus Christ Superstar played at the Palais in 1973 and 1976, and Joan Sutherland appeared with the Australian Opera in The Merry Widow in 1979.

In 1974/5, a Warner Brothers movie, A Film About Jimi Hendrix, had its Australian premiere at the Palais by special arrangement with the Paul Dainty Corporation. This was also the first time that a 1,000-watt sound system was used at a cinema screening in Australia.

In 1975, the International Women's Film Festival screened and hosted events at the Palais, coordinated by Suzanne Spunner, founder of Lip, a feminist magazine, the following year.

In the mid-2000s, the City of Port Phillip, managers of the land, proposed a large-scale redevelopment of the St Kilda 'Triangle', the site including the Palais and the adjacent car park. The lease of the site and building, which was nearing its end, was not renewed with the then-lessee, who controversially removed a number of items, notably the Spanish-style lobby chandelier. After various court cases, it was determined that their ownership by the former lessee was valid, and they remain in storage as of 2017.

Between 2007 and 2016 the venue was managed by Palais Theatre Management Pty Ltd, a body set up by the local City of Port Phillip. In 2016 a new 30-year lease was granted to events management company Live Nation, and the state premier Daniel Andrews announced a A$20-million restoration.

The renovated theatre, repainted in its original sand colour after decades as off-white, reopened in May 2017.

== Architecture ==
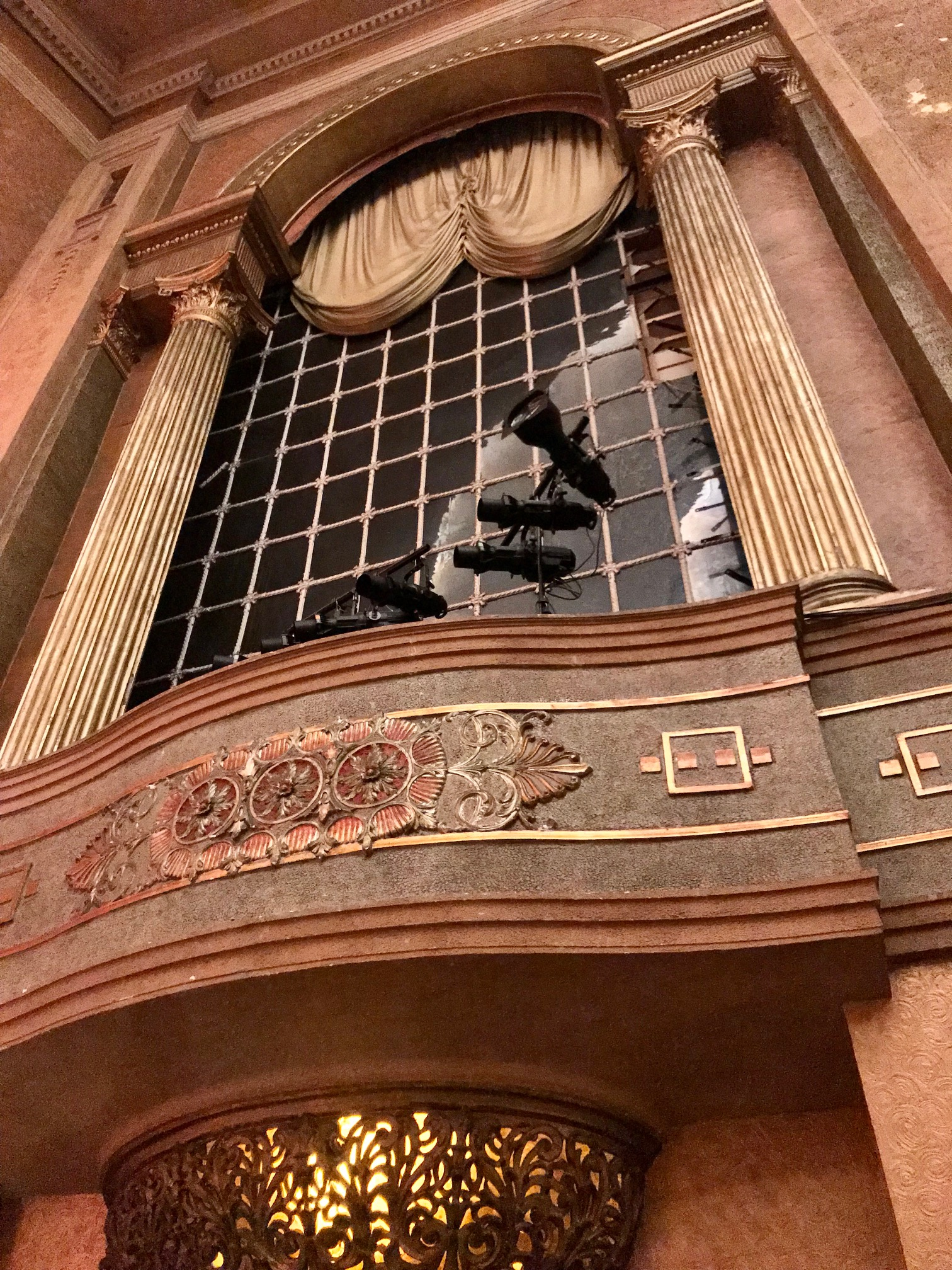
One of the theatre's boxes

Typical of 1920s picture theatres, the architectural style is ornate, eclectic and exotic. The arched roof and twin domed towers of the façade is an arrangement shared by other entertainment buildings in the foreshore area, notably Luna Park next door, the St Kilda Sea Baths, and long demolished landmarks like the Palais de Danse to the north, and the St. Moritz Ice Rink on the Upper Esplanade.

The architect Henry White stated that he adopted no particular style in the design of the Palais Pictures building, and the interior has been described at times as Spanish, French, Oriental and Italian.

The exterior does features Spanish Baroque detailing on top of the towers, while the interior is broadly neoclassical with tall columns and pilasters and a shallow dome in the auditorium, with elaborate textured plaster surfaces and detailing in the Adam style, and extensive concealed lighting.

The Palais is included on the Victorian Heritage Register.

== In popular culture ==
- The movie Stork, featuring Jacki Weaver and Bruce Spence, premiered at the theatre in 1971
- The theatre is featured in the 1976 Australian film Oz (a take on The Wonderful Wizard of Oz)
- Michael Nesmith of the Monkees recorded a solo album at the theatre titled Live at the Palais (released 1978)
- The theatre exterior was utilised as a location for the 1985 INXS music video for "Listen Like Thieves"
- The theatre is featured in the 1993 Australian comedy film Hercules Returns, directed by David Parker
- A digitally modified Palais makes a cameo in the 2007 movie Dead Silence as the abandoned and haunted "Theatre at Lost Lake", featuring the top of the building and its towers
- In Miss Fisher's Murder Mysteries, the theatre and Luna Park are used in the background near the end of the second-series episode "Deadweight".

== Awards and nominations ==
At the Music Victoria Awards of 2015, the Palais Theatre was inducted into the Hall of Fame.

The Music Victoria Awards are an annual awards night celebrating Victorian music. They commenced in 2006. The award for Best Venue was introduced in 2016.

Year	Nominee / work	Award	Result	Ref.
2022 Music Victoria Awards	Palais Theatre	Best Large Venue (Metro)	Nominated	
