= Hayden Orpheum Picture Palace =

Cinema built in Cremorne, New South Wales, Australia in 1935

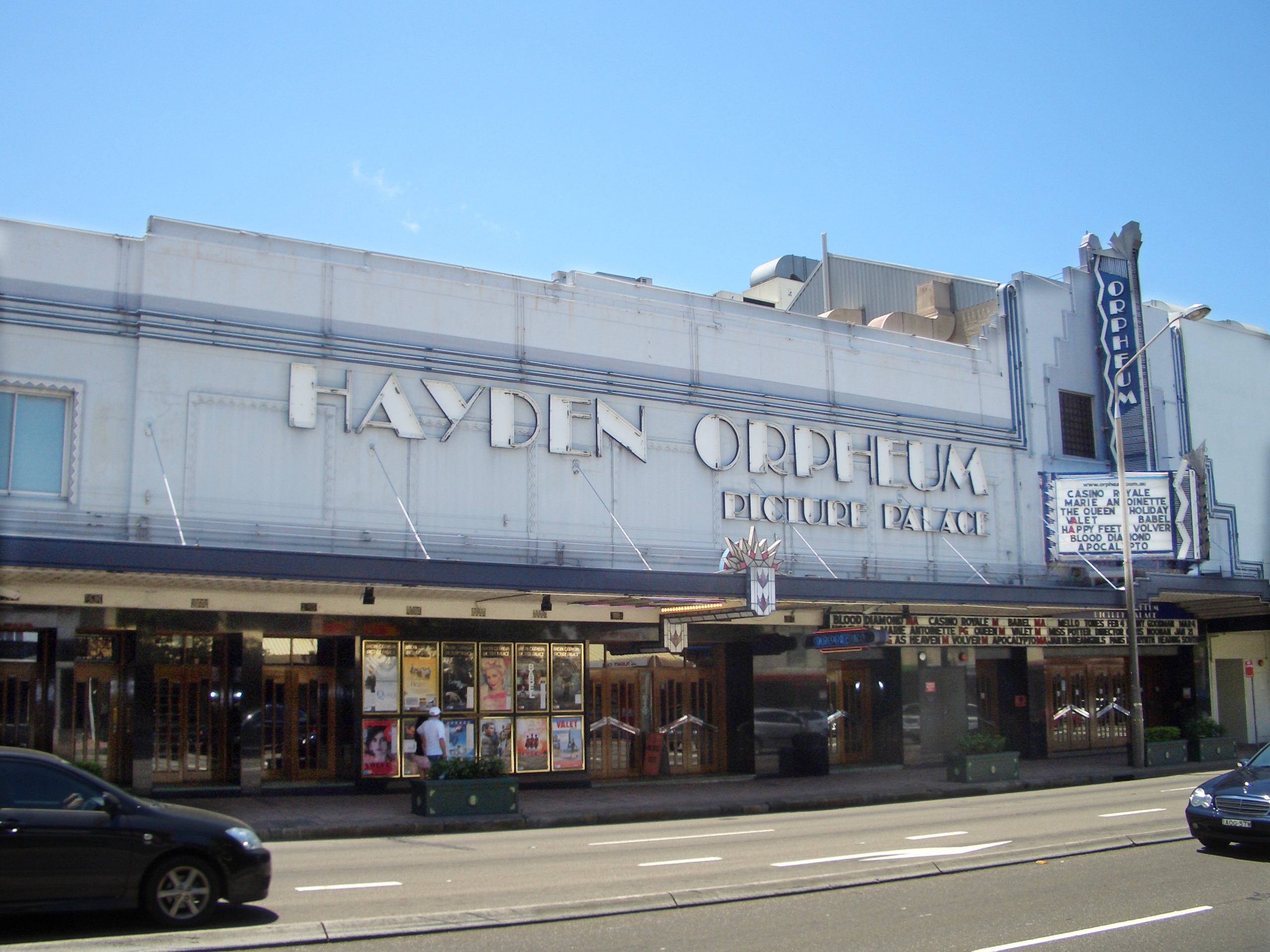
- Pictured in 2007
- Interactive map of Hayden Orpheum Picture Palace
- 33°49′41″S 151°13′47″E
- Location: 380 Military Road, Cremorne, North Sydney Council, New South Wales, Australia

History
- Built: 4 October 1935; 91 years ago
- Built for: Angelo Virgona

Site notes
- Architect: George Newton Kenworthy
- Architectural style: Inter-war Art Deco

The Hayden Orpheum Picture Palace, also known and originally as the Cremorne Orpheum Theatre, is a heritage-listed cinema located at 380 Military Road, in the suburb of Cremorne in the North Sydney Council local government area on Sydney's Lower North Shore in New South Wales, Australia. It was designed by George Newton Kenworthy and built in 1935 by F. T. Eastment and Sons. It was added as a Heritage Item to the North Sydney Local Environmental Plan 2013 on 2 August 2013.

The architect, George Newton Kenworthy, is known for his work in the Art Deco style, and most particularly his designs for theatres and cinemas including the Enfield Savoy Theatre (alterations 1938), the Majestic Theatre in Port Macquarie (1936), and the Regent Theatre in Mudgee (1935).

== History ==
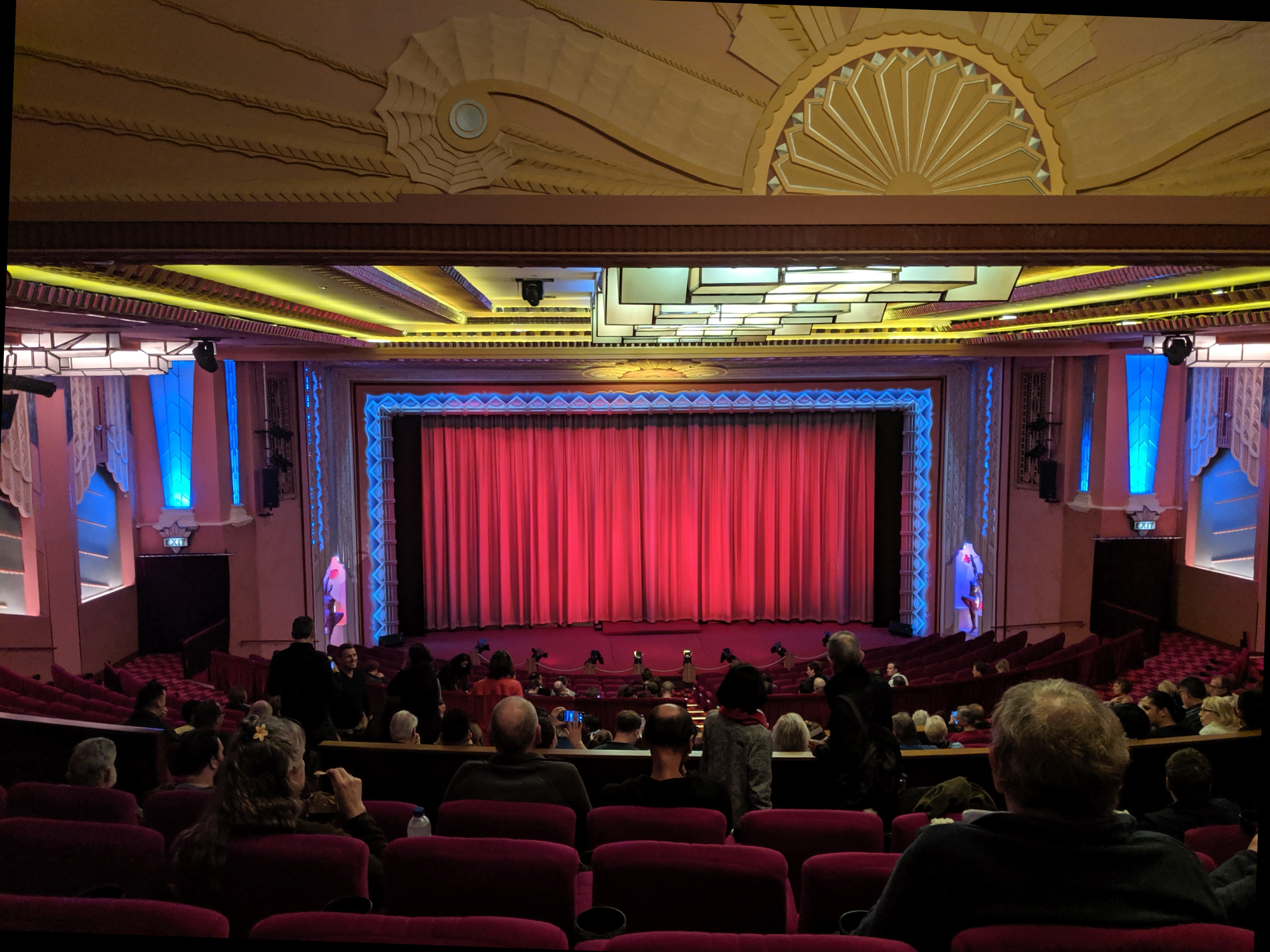
View from interior

The Italian-Australian Virgona family led by director Angelo Virgona, who had opened the North Sydney Orpheum on the corner of Alfred Street and Junction Street in North Sydney in 1913 and renovated into a more modern style in 1924 (it was resumed in 1968 and demolished for the new Warringah Expressway), commissioned a new cinema further north in the Cremorne area in 1934 with an Art Deco design by prominent architect George Newton Kenworthy. Completed at a cost of over £45,000, the Cremorne Orpheum Theatre was officially opened on 3 October 1935 by the local Member for Neutral Bay, Reginald Weaver. On its opening the Sydney Morning Herald noted that it was "designed on strictly modern lines, especially with regard to acoustic response and internal furnishings. It is regarded as one of the most up-to-date structures of the kind in Australia." When it was first opened the theatre was also used for stage productions.

After a failed attempt to sell the theatre in 1971, it remained a family operated cinema until the Orpheum closed in 1979, a fate shared by many other suburban cinemas across Sydney. However in 1977 it had already been recognised for its heritage value by the National Trust of Australia (New South Wales), and its restoration was undertaken in 1987 led by John Love for a new owner, television personality Mike Walsh, at a cost of $2.5 million The restoration works also transformed the theatre into a multiplex cinema, with the addition of a second screen in the former Ballroom area. Rechristened as the "Hayden Orpheum Picture Palace", it reopened on 9 December 1987 with the feature Planes, Trains and Automobiles. A third and fourth screens were added in the 1990s and two more were added in 2000 in the place of the former shopping arcade.

The 1987 restoration also added a 1925 Wurlitzer pipe-organ that was originally installed in the Wilson Theatre in Fresno, California until 1973, and it is often played at selected film screenings. The cinema, which is a longtime favourite of film critic David Stratton, celebrated its 80th birthday in 2015.

== See also ==
- Australian non-residential architectural styles
