= Enfield Savoy Theatre =

Former theatre and cinema in Sydney

- Enfield Cinema; Hoyts Savoy Theatre; Enfield Savoy
- Location within Sydney
- Address: 306–308 Liverpool Road, Enfield; Sydney, New South Wales; Australia
- Coordinates: 33°53′13″S 151°05′34″E
- Capacity: 1,878
- Current use: Hardware store

Construction
- Opened: 16 November 1927
- Closed: 9 January 1960
- Architects: Clifford M. Chard, Lewis Kaberry, George Newton Kenworthy

Website
- strathfieldheritage.org/recreation-and-shops/enfield-savoy-cinema/

The Enfield Savoy Theatre (previously the Enfield Cinema; subsequently the Hoyts Savoy Theatre; also known as the Enfield Savoy) was a theatre and cinema located at 306-308 Liverpool Road, Enfield, a suburb in the inner west region of Sydney, New South Wales, Australia. The building now functions as a hardware store.

== History ==
Designed by the architectural firm Kaberry and Chard, the theatre was opened on 16 November 1927, with a seating capacity of 1,878. In 1928 Enfield Council valued the building at A£17,000.

In 1930 there was an armed hold up at the theatre. In 1932, Western Suburbs Cinemas Ltd, a company which also operated the Strathfield Melba and Homebush Theatre in Sydney's western suburbs took over management of the Enfield Savoy.

The theatre was redesigned in the Art Deco style in 1938. The façade and interior were rebuilt under guidance of architect G N Kentworthy who also designed Cremorne Orpheum Theatre and a Christie organ was added and was opened by organist Dennis Palmistra. The instrument was originally installed in the Hoyts De Luxe Theatre, Melbourne, then the Hoyts Plaza Theatre, Sydney. The cinema was renamed the Savoy and reopened by the Mayor of Enfield in July 1938.

In 1944 Western Suburbs Cinemas Ltd was taken over by Hoyts resulting in a name change to the Hoyts Savoy Theatre.

The last film shown at the cinema was Some Like It Hot in 1960.

It was converted into a carpet & furniture shop in 1981, and continues today as a plumbing & bathroom company.

== Later years ==
After the cinema closed, the building had various retail uses including Shoppers World (1960), carpet and furniture store (1981), Quality House, Whitewood Warehouse, and the Poliak Building Supply Company.

A campaign in 2017 to list the building on the local heritage register was unsuccessful.
