= Nobby (disambiguation) =

Nobby is a diminutive form of the name Norbert or a nickname.

Nobby, Nobby's, Nobbys or Nobbie may also refer to:

== Places ==
=== Antarctic ===
- Nobby Nunatak, Trinity Peninsula, Antarctica
- Nobby (Antarctica), a rock near South Georgia Island

=== Australia ===
==== New South Wales ====
- Nobbys Beach, a beach in the suburb of Newcastle East, New South Wales, part of greater Newcastle
- Nobbys Head, a headland at Newcastle
- Nobbys Tuff, a geologic formation near Newcastle
- Nobbys Creek, New South Wales, a town in northern New South Wales

==== Queensland ====
- Nobby, Queensland, a town in the Toowoomba Region

==== South Australia ====
- Nobby Islet, a small island in South Australia

== Other uses ==
- Nobbie Dzinzi, a politician elected in the Zimbabwean parliamentary election, 2000
- Nobby (boat), a fishing boat
- Nobby, a strip in the comics Buzz
- Nobby, rhyming slang "Nobby Clarke" Shark (current british merchant navy mid 20th cent).

== See also ==
- Noddy (disambiguation)
