= Noddies =

Noddies could refer to:

- Noddy (tern)
- Noddy (TV interview technique)
- Velocette LE riding British Police motorcyclists
- Noddy (bird), seabirds in the genus Anous

== See also ==
- Noddy (disambiguation)
- Nods (disambiguation)
- NOD (disambiguation)
