= List of shipwrecks in May 1876 =

The list of shipwrecks in May 1876 includes ships sunk, foundered, grounded, or otherwise lost during May 1876.

== 1 May ==
List of shipwrecks: 1 May 1876
Ship	State	Description
Henriette Louise	Norway	The brig foundered off Cape Finisterre, Spain. Her crew were rescued by Fortuna (Flag unknown). Henriette Louise was on a voyage from Spain to Memel, Germany.

== 2 May ==
List of shipwrecks: 2 May 1876
Ship	State	Description
Finchale	United Kingdom	The steamship ran aground on the Horsens Sandbank, in the North Sea off the Dutch coast. She was refloated and taken in to the Nieuwe Diep.
William, Henry, and Robert	United Kingdom	The brig foundered in the North Sea with the loss of all hands, according to a message in a bottle that washed was discovered at sea 20 nautical miles (37 km) north east of Tynemouth, Northumberland by the fishing boat No. 21 (United Kingdom) in late June.

== 3 May ==
List of shipwrecks: 3 May 1876
Ship	State	Description
John Black	United Kingdom	The barque was driven ashore near the Sherbourne Lighthouse, Nova Scotia, Canada. She was on a voyage from Havre de Grâce, Seine-Inférieure, France to Sandy Hook, New Jersey, United States.
Kembla	New South Wales	The ship was driven ashore between Shepherd's Hill and Nobbys Head. She was on a voyage from Sydney to Newcastle.
You Yangs	New South Wales	The ship was driven ashore east south east of Nobbys Head Lighthouse. She was on a voyage from Sydney to Newcastle.

== 4 May ==
List of shipwrecks: 4 May 1876
Ship	State	Description
Calcium	United Kingdom	The steamship struck the Goldstone Rock and foundered off Lindisfarne, Northumberland with thee loss of six of her eleven crew. She was on a voyage from Middlesbrough, Yorkshire to Leith, Lothian.
John Black	United Kingdom	The barque was driven ashore near the Sherbourne Lighthouse, Nova Scotia, Canada. She was on a voyage from Havre de Grâce, Seine-Inférieure, France to Sandy Hook, New Jersey, United States.
Vigilant	United States	The steamship was driven ashore and wrecked at Cartagena, United States of Colombia.

== 5 May ==
List of shipwrecks: 5 May 1876
Ship	State	Description
Emma	France	The ship was driven ashore at Latheron, Caithness, United Kingdom.

== 7 May ==
List of shipwrecks: 7 May 1876
Ship	State	Description
Admiral	United Kingdom	The fishing cutter was lost off Rømø, Denmark. Her five crew survived.
Paragon	United Kingdom	The smack caught fire 15 nautical miles (28 km) north west of Trevose Head, Cornwall. Her three crew were rescued by a French lugger. She was on a voyage from Milford Haven, Pembrokeshire to Southampton, Hampshire.

== 8 May ==
List of shipwrecks: 8 May 1876
Ship	State	Description
Marinus	United Kingdom	The ship ran aground at Antigua. She was refloated with assistance.
Martha	United States	The ship collided with Vincenzo Perotto (Italy) and sank. Martha was on a voyage from New York to Puerto Rico.

== 9 May ==
List of shipwrecks: 9 May 1876
Ship	State	Description
Carl	Denmark	The brig was driven ashore at Martinique. Her crew were rescued. She was a total loss.
Europa	Norway	The ship ran aground at West Hartlepool, County Durham, United Kingdom. She was on a voyage from Pensacola, Florida to West Hartlepool. She was refloated.

== 10 May ==
List of shipwrecks: 10 May 1876
Ship	State	Description
Cito	Germany	The barque was wrecked in a typhoon at Taiwan, China.
Clyde	United Kingdom	The barque was damaged in a typhoon in China.
Elliot	United Kingdom	The steamship was driven out to sea from Taiwan, China in a typhoon.
Figen	Flag unknown	The barque was wrecked in a typhoon in China. Her crew were rescued.
Leonore	Flag unknown	The brig was driven on to the Vulay Shoals, off Taiwan, China in a typhoon and was wrecked.
Maria	(United Kingdom of Great Britain and Ireland) Isle of Man	The schooner was wrecked at "Clay Heide", near Castletown. Her crew survived.
Marie and Helen	Germany	The barque was wrecked in a typhoon at Taiwan, China.
Peckham	United Kingdom	The ship was driven ashore at the Cliff End Fort, Isle of Wight. She was on a voyage from Newcastle upon Tyne, Northumberland to Portsmouth, Hampshire. She was refloated.
Reunion	United States	The barque struck a rock and sank off Genoa, Italy. Her crew took to a boat and landed on Elba. She was on a voyage from Genoa to New York.
Soudon	Flag unknown	The barque was wrecked in a typhoon in China. Her crew were rescued.
Traviata	Flag unknown	The barque was wrecked in a typhoon in China. Her crew were rescued.
Wilhelm	Germany	The barque was wrecked in a typhoon at Taiwan, China.
Yarra	United Kingdom	The barque was damaged in a typhoon in China.
Unnamed	United Kingdom	The barque was wrecked in a typhoon in China.
Unnamed	Germany	The schooner was wrecked in a typhoon in China.

== 11 May ==
List of shipwrecks: 11 May 1876
Ship	State	Description
Japan	United Kingdom	The ship was damaged by fire at Sunderland, County Durham.
Prince Soltykoff	United Kingdom	The steamship ran aground at East Greenwich, Kent. She was on a voyage from Sulina, Ottoman Empire to London. She was refloated the next day and resumed her voyage.
Winogene	Canada	The ship was wrecked in ice off the coast of Greenland. Her crew were rescued.

== 12 May ==
List of shipwrecks: 12 May 1876
Ship	State	Description
Barboza Segundo	Portugal	The brigantine was wrecked at Madeira. Her crew were rescued.
Maurice	United States	The brigantine was wrecked at Madeira. Her crew were rescued.
Moura	Portugal	The cutter was wrecked at Madeira with the loss of a crew member.
Nellie Clifford	United States	The brigantine was wrecked at Madeira. Her crew were rescued, but a Portuguese customs officer was drowned.
Osprey	United Kingdom	The schooner was driven ashore at Madeira. Her crew were rescued by rocket apparatus.
Sarah Young	United Kingdom	The ship was wrecked at St. Peter's, Nova Scotia, Canada. She was on a voyage from Ardrossan, Ayrshire to Quebec City, Canada.

== 13 May ==
List of shipwrecks: 13 May 1876
Ship	State	Description
Balbec	France	The steamship ran aground at Havre de Grâce, Seine-Inférieure. She was on a voyage from Liverpool, Lancashire, United Kingdom to Havre de Grâce.
Edward John	United Kingdom	The schooner was run into by the steamship Lady Devonshire (United Kingdom) and sank in the River Mersey. Her crew were rescued by Lady Devonshire. Edward John was on a voyage from Teignmouth, Devon to Liverpool, or from Fowey, Cornwall to Runcorn, Cheshire.
Messina	Sweden	The barque ran aground at Ballyshannon, County Donegal, United Kingdom. She was refloated and taken in to Ballyshannon.
Prospero	United Kingdom	The ship was sighted in the Indian Ocean whilst on a voyage from Rangoon, Burma to London. No further trace, presumed foundered with the loss of all hands.

== 14 May ==
List of shipwrecks: 14 May 1876
Ship	State	Description
Kate	New Zealand	The 26-ton schooner foundered off the mouth of the Grey River. Her crew were saved.

== 15 May ==
List of shipwrecks: 15 May 1876
Ship	State	Description
A 1	United Kingdom	The barque collided with an iceberg in the Gulf of Saint Lawrence (48°40′N 62°45′W) She foundered the next day. Her crew were rescued by Bruces (United Kingdom). A 1 was on her maiden voyage, from Liverpool, Lancashire to Montreal, Quebec, Canada.

== 16 May ==
List of shipwrecks: 16 May 1876
Ship	State	Description
Accidental Star	United Kingdom	The barque foundered in the Atlantic Ocean (43°46′N 13°12′W). Her nine crew were rescued by the barque Ocean King (United Kingdom). Accidental Star was on a voyage from Lisbon, Portugal to Vlaardingen, South Holland, Netherlands.
Amalia Sinnige	Netherlands	The steamship departed from Bremerhaven, Germany for Runcorn, Cheshire, United Kingdom. No further trace, presumed foundered with the loss of all hands.
Erin	United Kingdom	The steamship sank at Bangor, County Down. She was on a voyage from Belfast, County Antrim to Bangor.
Soledad	(France) Algeria	The ship was wrecked at "Merzetarl". Her crew were rescued. She was on a voyage from Marseille, Bouches-du-Rhône to Philippeville.

== 17 May ==
List of shipwrecks: 17 May 1876
Ship	State	Description
August Reimers	Germany	The ship was wrecked on Taiwan, China. Her crew were rescued.
Cariata	Germany	The ship was wrecked on Taiwan, China. Her crew were rescued.
Craig Gowan	United Kingdom	The schooner struck the Feenish Rock, off the Aran Islands, County Galway and was wrecked. Her crew survived. She was on a voyage from Kinvara, County Galway to the Bristol Channel.
Fyen	Denmark	The ship was wrecked on Taiwan, China. Her crew were rescued.
Leonore	New South Wales	The ship was driven ashore at Amoy, China.
Sudan	Germany	The ship was wrecked on Taiwan, China. Her crew were rescued.
Torra	United Kingdom	The ship was damaged at Taiwan, China.
Wilhelm	Germany	The ship was wrecked on Taiwan, China. Her crew were rescued.

== 18 May ==
List of shipwrecks: 18 May 1876
Ship	State	Description
Ilmatar	(Russian Empire) Grand Duchy of Finland	The barque was wrecked at Dungeness, Kent, United Kingdom. Her seventeen crew were rescued by the Lydd Lifeboat.
Nile	New Zealand	The 24-ton schooner ran onto rocks near Pencarrow Head Lighthouse at the mouth of Wellington Harbour and became a total wreck. Her crew were rescued.

== 19 May ==
List of shipwrecks: 19 May 1876
Ship	State	Description
C. H. Soule	United Kingdom	The full-rigged ship sprang a leak and foundered in the Indian Ocean. Her crew were rescued by Elizabeth Martin (United Kingdom). C. H. Soulo was on a voyage from Batavia, Netherlands East Indies to Greenock, Renfrewshire.
Constance	Italy	The barque was driven ashore at Carvellas, Brazil. She was on a voyage from Buenos Aires, Argentina to the English Channel.
Kotschka	Germany	The sloop was wrecked at Liepāja, Russia. Her crew were rescued.
Marie Georg	Germany	The brig was driven ashore at Carvellas. She was on a voyage from Hamburg to Buenos Aires.

== 20 May ==
List of shipwrecks: 20 May 1876
Ship	State	Description
Jenny Queirole	France	The ship was driven ashore in Big Glace Bay. She was on a voyage from Bordeaux, Gironde to Montreal, Quebec, Canada.
Velleda	France	The ship was wrecked in the Devi River. Her crew were rescued.
Vigilante	United Kingdom	The steamship was wrecked at Cartagena, United States of Colombia.

== 21 May ==
List of shipwrecks: 21 May 1876
Ship	State	Description
Rohamnee	India	The ship was destroyed by fire in the Indian Ocean with the loss of 36 of the 58 people on board. Survivors took to a raft; they were rescued on 24 May by Eva Joshua (United Kingdom). Rohamnee was on a voyage from Calcutta to Ceylon.

== 22 May ==
List of shipwrecks: 22 May 1876
Ship	State	Description
Argo	Norway	The brig ran aground off Naissaar, Russia. She was refloated with the assistance of a steamship and towed in to Helsinki, Grand Duchy of Finland.
Notre Dame	France	The lugger was run into by the steamship Marie Stuart (United Kingdom) and sank at Dunkirk, Nord. Her crew were rescued.
Stanley Main	United Kingdom	The ship ran aground on the Redcliffe Sand, in the Humber near North Ferriby, Yorkshire. She broke in two and was wrecked. She was on a voyage from Hamburg, Germany to Goole, Yorkshire. The wreck was dispersed by explosives in May 1877.
Swan	United Kingdom	The brigantine was driven ashore at Ramsgate, Kent. She was refloated and found to be leaky.
HMS Tyrian	Royal Navy	The Britomart-class gunboat ran aground at Fraserburgh, Aberdeenshire. She was refloated.

== 23 May ==
List of shipwrecks: 23 May 1876
Ship	State	Description
Bonanza	United States	The fishing boat was wrecked off Plymouth, Massachusetts. Her crew were rescued.
Harrisburg	United Kingdom	The ship sank 10 nautical miles (19 km) south of Tavira, Portugal. Her crew were rescued. She was on a voyage from Cardiff, Glamorgan to Japan.
San Marcos	United Kingdom	The steamship put in to Baltimore, Maryland, United States on fire. She was on a voyage from Galveston, Texas, United States to Liverpool, Lancashire.
Sarah	New Zealand	The 233-ton brig stranded and was wrecked on a reef on the coast of Northland, New Zealand, close to the Poor Knights Islands.

== 24 May ==
List of shipwrecks: 24 May 1876
Ship	State	Description
Britannia	Germany	The ship ran aground at Maassluis, South Holland, Netherlands and was wrecked.
General Barrios	Guatemala	The steamship sprang a leak and foundered in the Bay of Fonseca with the loss of fourteen lives. She was on a voyage from San Jose to Ampala.

== 25 May ==
List of shipwrecks: 25 May 1876
Ship	State	Description
Wilhelmine	Germany	The barque was driven ashore at Thisted, Denmark. Her crew were rescued. She was on a voyage from Stettin to Bristol, Gloucestershire, United Kingdom.

== 26 May ==
List of shipwrecks: 26 May 1876
Ship	State	Description
Amazonas	Brazil	The steamship sank in the Maderia River between Borba and "Cochocirina". All on board were rescued.
Little Western	United Kingdom	The hulk was run into by the steamship Ryhope (United Kingdom) and sank off Tilbury Fort, Essex.
S. N. Collymore	Canada	The ship collided with National Eagle (United States) and sank. She was on a voyage from San Francisco, California, United States to Saint John, New Brunswick.

== 27 May ==
List of shipwrecks: 27 May 1876
Ship	State	Description
Thérèse	France	The schooner was wrecked in the Faroe Islands. Her crew were rescued by the smack Nordlyset (Flag unknown).

== 28 May ==
List of shipwrecks: 28 May 1876
Ship	State	Description
Catherine and Mary	United Kingdom	The ship struck a sunken rock off Start Point, Devon. She put in to Dartmouth, Devon in a leaky condition.
Ruby	United Kingdom	The schooner ran aground and was wrecked off Inchcape, Fife. Her five crew were rescued by the steamship Drumhendry (United Kingdom). Ruby was on a voyage from London to Dundee, Forfarshire.

== 29 May ==
List of shipwrecks: 29 May 1876
Ship	State	Description
Belfort	United Kingdom	The ship departed from Lagos, Lagos Colony for Falmouth, Cornwall or Queenstown, County Cork. No further trace, presumed foundered with the loss of all hands.
Brazilian	United Kingdom	The steamship ran aground on the Vendrée Reef. She was on a voyage from Spain to London. She was refloated and put in to Brest, Finistère, France sinking at the bows. Brazilian was refloated on 5 September.
Briton	United Kingdom	The Mersey Flat ran aground off the Hilbre Islands, Cheshire. She was refloated on 21 June.
Elizabeth Martin	United Kingdom	The ship ran aground on the Black Rock, off Falmouth. She was on a voyage from Carrizal to Greenock, Renfrewshire.
Golden Fleece	United Kingdom	The smack was driven ashore on Vlieland, Friesland, Netherlands and was abandoned by her crew. She was refloated.
Joaquino Anna	United States	The schooner was abandoned. Her crew were rescued. She was towed in to Hong Kong by the schooner Scotland (United States).
Lady Helena	United Kingdom	The schooner ran aground off the Hilbre Islands. She was refloated on 21 June.
Merry Monarch	United Kingdom	The barque ran into the Sloane Quay, in the Bosphorus and was beached at Büyükdere. She was on a voyage from Constantinople, Ottoman Empire to Taganrog, Russia.
Rosa del Turia	Spain	The ship was wrecked on the Pelican Shoals. She was on a voyage from St. Mary's to Málaga.

== 30 May ==
List of shipwrecks: 30 May 1876
Ship	State	Description
Anna	France	The schooner was driven ashore and severely damaged near Wick, Caithness, United Kingdom. She was refloated and taken in to Aberdeen, United Kingdom.
British King	United Kingdom	The ship departed from the River Tyne for San Francisco, California, United States. No further trace, presumed foundered with the loss of all 40 crew.
Edouard	France	The schooner ran aground at Berck, Pas-de-Calais.

== 31 May ==
List of shipwrecks: 31 May 1876
Ship	State	Description
British Ensign	United Kingdom	The brigantine was driven ashore and severely damaged at Great Yarmouth, Norfolk. She was on a voyage from Swansea, Glamorgan to Great Yarmouth. She was refloated and towed in to Great Yarmouth.
Delta	United Kingdom	The ship departed from Lagos, Lagos Colony for Deal, Kent. No further trace, presumed foundered with the loss of all hands.
Dryaden	Norway	The barque was driven ashore and wrecked at Punta Caleta, Cuba. Her crew were rescued. Also reported as driven ashore and wrecked at "Cape Antonio", Jamaica.
John Liddell	United Kingdom	The steamship ran aground at Woolwich Dockyard, Kent whilst avoiding a collision with a barge.
Mary	United Kingdom	The sloop was abandoned off Sanda Island, in the Firth of Clyde. Her crew were rescued by the steamship Laurel (United Kingdom). Mary was on a voyage from Glenarm to Belfast, County Antrim.
The Brothers	United Kingdom	The steam lighter was destroyed by fire at Dundee, Forfarshire.

== Unknown date ==
List of shipwrecks: Unknown date in May 1876
Ship	State	Description
A. J.	United Kingdom	The ship foundered in the Atlantic Ocean. Her crew were rescued. She was on a voyage from South Shields, County Durham to Montreal, Quebec, Canada.
Apollo	Norway	The barque ran aground at Saint John, New Brunswick, Canada. She was on a voyage from Saint John to Belfast, County Antrim, United Kingdom. She was refloated and put back to Saint John in a severely damaged condition. She was placed under repair.
Atlantic	United Kingdom	The ship ran aground on the Kentish Knock. She was refloated with assistance from the tug Liverpool (United Kingdom) and was towed in to Ramsgate, Kent.
Catharina	United Kingdom	The ship was abandoned in the Atlantic Ocean before 28 May.
Dart	Jamaica	The sloop ran aground and was wrecked. She was on a voyage from the Rio Nuevo to St. Anne's Bay.
Dovre	Flag unknown	The ship ran aground at Akyab, Burma.
Felix Conceicão	Portugal	The brigantine was driven ashore Barbados. All on board were rescued. She was a total loss.
Guiseppina	Austria-Hungary	The ship was driven ashore and wrecked at Garrucha, Spain.
Hawk	(Dominion of Newfoundland) Newfoundland Colony	The sealer, a steamship, was abandoned at sea. Her crew were rescued.
Jane Young	United Kingdom	The ship was wrecked on Langlade Island before 13 May. She was on a voyage from Ardrossan, Ayrshire to Quebec City.
Julia Lingley	United Kingdom	The abandoned brigantice was towed in to Pernambuco, Brazil.
Kashgar	India	The ship was destroyed by fire off the coast of Goa. Her crew were rescued.
Lucia C.	Italy	The ship was driven ashore at Philadelphia, Pennsylvania, United States. She was on a voyage from Philadelphia to Queenstown, County Cork, United Kingdom. She was refloated and taken in to the Delaware Breakwater.
N. C. Kierkegaard	Flag unknown	The ship foundered off the Rattlesnake Shoals before 11 May. She was on a voyage from London, United Kingdom to Savannah, Georgia.
Rita	Spain	The steamship ran aground in the Southwest Pass. She was on a voyage from Havana, Cuba to New Orleans, Louisiana, United States.
Saratoga	United States	The fishing schooner was sunk, possibly in a collision, on the Georges Bank in early May. Lost with between nine and twelve crew.
Tradesman	United Kingdom	The schooner was driven ashore near "Coursuelles", France.
Wenonah	United Kingdom	The ship was driven ashore at Musquash, New Brunswick, Canada. She was refloated and taken in to Saint John, New Brunswick in a leaky condition.
