= Noddy =

Noddy may refer to:

== People ==
- Noddy, nickname of Australian rugby league player Brett Kimmorley
- Nathaniel Reilly-O'Donnell (born 1988), British rower nicknamed "Noddy"
- Noddy Holder, English musician and actor, best known as vocalist and guitarist with Slade
- Tom Noddy, stage name of American entertainer Tom McAllister, creator of bubble magic tricks

== Arts and entertainment ==
- Noddy (card game), a 16th-century English ancestor of cribbage
- Noddy (character), a wooden man who lives in Toyland, created by children's author Enid Blyton
  - Noddy (TV series), a children's program 1998–2000
- Noddy, nickname of Nicodemus Boffin, from the novel Our Mutual Friend by Charles Dickens

== Vehicles ==
- Noddy, a small, usually two-wheeled, one-horse hackney carriage formerly used in Ireland and Scotland
- Noddy bike, nickname for the Velocette LE motorcycles formerly used by the British police
- Noddy (log canoe), listed on the National Register of Historic Places in 1985

== Other uses ==
- Noddy (camera), a camera system use by the BBC 1963–1985
- Noddy, several species of tropical seabirds of the family Sternidae in the genera Anous
- Noddy, or nod shot, a video production technique used to create the illusion of a seamless dialogue
- Noddy, an application for the Memotech MTX series of microcomputers
- Noddy suit, nickname for a type of NBC suit with a pointed hood used by the British Armed Forces
- NODDY, codename for a British Secret Intelligence Service operation to penetrate the Polish security establishment in the early 1960s
- Noddy (as an adjective) Cumbernauldian in Glaswegian slang, e.g. Noddy Land, Noddy News

== See also ==
- Noddy housing, commercially built housing of low build quality or design merit
- Noddies (disambiguation)
- NOD (disambiguation)
