= Earp Gillam Bond Store =

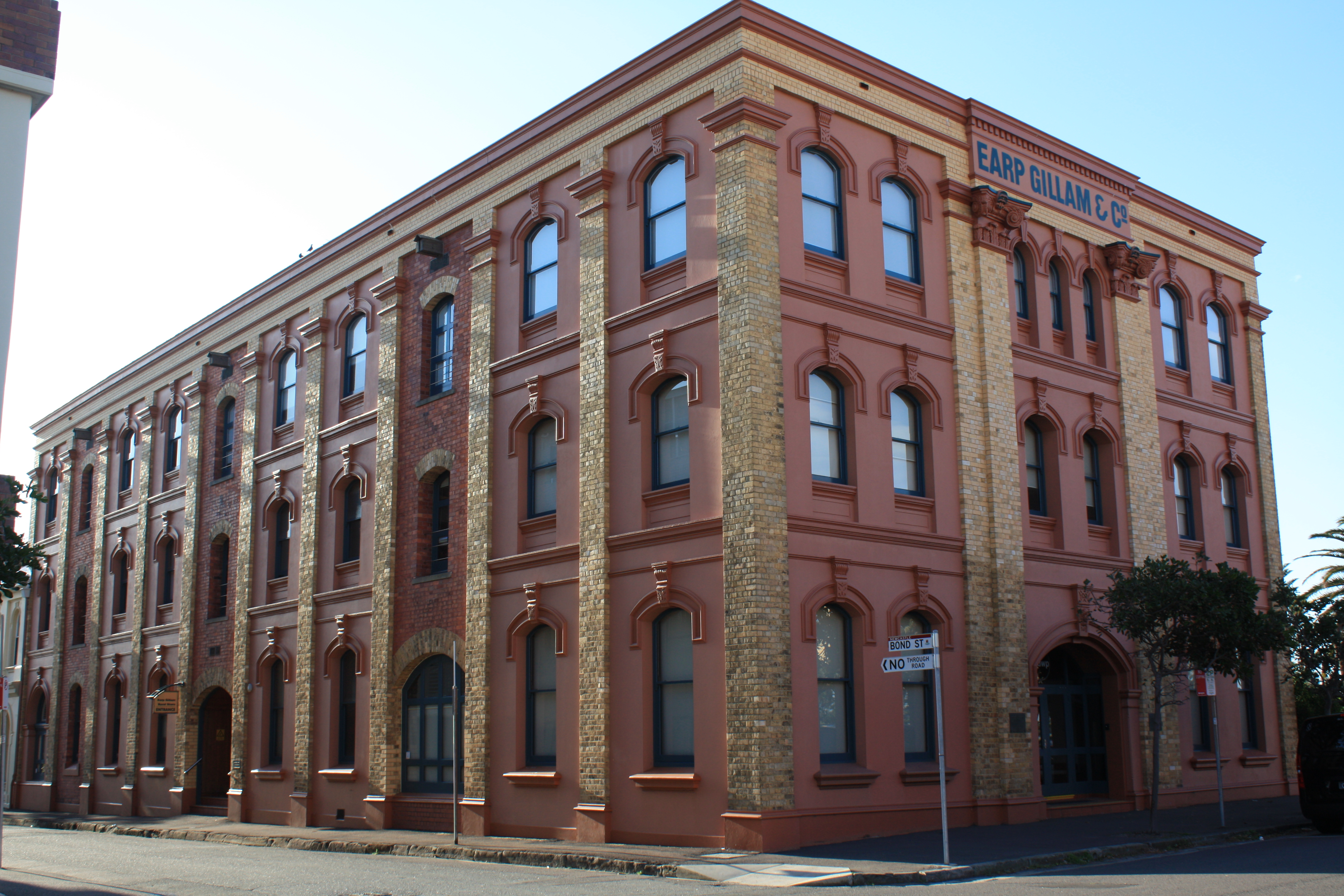

- Location within New South Wales Location within Australia
- 32.9267°S 151.7868°E
- Location: 16 Telford Street, Newcastle East, City of Newcastle, New South Wales, Australia

Site notes
- Owner: Lahey Trustees Pty Ltd

New South Wales Heritage Register
- Official name: Earp Gillam Bond Store Precinct
- Type: state heritage (built)
- Designated: 2 April 1999
- Reference no.: 762
- Type: historic site

The Earp Gillam Bond Store is a heritage-listed former bond store at 16 Telford Street, Newcastle East, in the Hunter region of New South Wales, Australia. It was added to the New South Wales State Heritage Register on 2 April 1999.

== History ==
The bond store was built in 1888, having been designed by Frederick Menkens and built by John Straub. It was the first warehouse of Newcastle merchant firm Earp Gillam & Co., founded in 1883, then-importers of groceries, flour, wine and timber. The warehouse was for the storage and handling of imported goods.

It was derelict for many years, during which time it suffered serious white ant and water damage. It was considered for demolition after being damaged in the 1989 Newcastle earthquake, in which part of the Telford Street wall "fell to rubble", reportedly due to corroded inbuilt ironwork.

It was subsequently refurbished as an office building by owners the Kempsey-based Lahey Group and Newcastle architects Suters Architects Snell. The refurbishment, which preserved the building's old pulleys, massive timber doors and exposed brickwork won a merit certificate in the Greenway Award for Conservation at the 1993 Royal Australian Institute of Architects Awards and a BOMA building award and Master Builders' Association of NSW Excellence in Construction Award for Renovation/Restoration of a Historic Building in 1994.

== Heritage listing ==
Earp Gillam Bond Store Precinct was listed on the New South Wales State Heritage Register on 2 April 1999.
