= Hornby Lighthouse =

Lighthouse in New South Wales, Australia

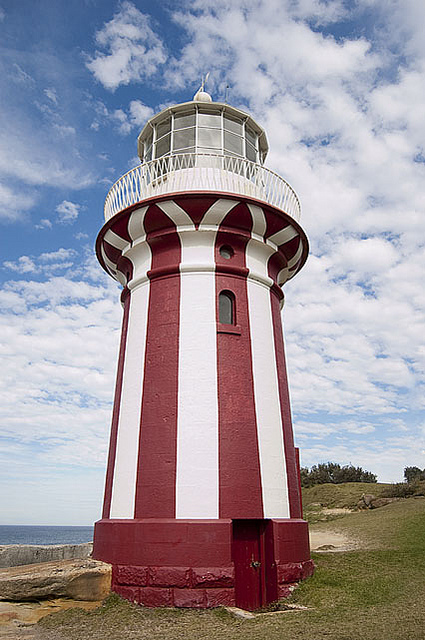
- Hornby Lighthouse, 2010
- Location: South Head, Sydney, New South Wales, Australia
- Coordinates: 33°50′1″S 151°16′52″E

Tower
- Constructed: 1858
- Construction: Sandstone tower
- Automated: 1933
- Height: 9.1 metres (30 ft)
- Shape: Cylindrical tower with balcony and lantern
- Markings: Striped vertically red and white tower, white gallery and lantern
- Operator: Sydney Ports Corporation (light); NSW National Parks & Wildlife Service (site)
- Heritage: Heritage Act — State Heritage Register

Light
- Focal height: 27.4 metres (90 ft)
- Lens: First order catoptric lens
- Range: 14 nautical miles (26 km; 16 mi) (Note: According to List of Lights. The Lighthouses of Australia Inc. lists as 15 nautical miles (28 km; 17 mi).)
- Characteristic: L Fl W 5s.
- Building details

Design and construction
- Architect: Mortimer Lewis

New South Wales Heritage Register
- Official name: South Head Signal Station
- Type: State heritage (built)
- Designated: 18 April 2000
- Reference no.: 01436
- Type: Signal Stations
- Category: Transport – Water

Hornby Lighthouse, also known as South Head Lower Light or South Head Signal Station, is a heritage-listed active lighthouse located on the tip of South Head, New South Wales, Australia, a headland to the north of the suburb Watsons Bay. It marks the southern entrance to Port Jackson, as well as lighting the South Reef, a ledge of submerged rocks. It is the third oldest lighthouse in New South Wales. Designed by Mortimer Lewis and listed on the (now defunct) Register of the National Estate and on the New South Wales State Heritage Register since 2 April 1999, with the following statement of significance:

A dominant Sydney landmark which appears to have been in continuous use since the 1840s as a controlling point for shipping entering and leaving Port Jackson. The building complex, designed by the Colonial Architect Mortimer Lewis in the early 1840s, is an architectural important example of an early Victorian public work associated with port activities.

— Statement of significance as listed on the New South Wales State Heritage Register.

== History ==
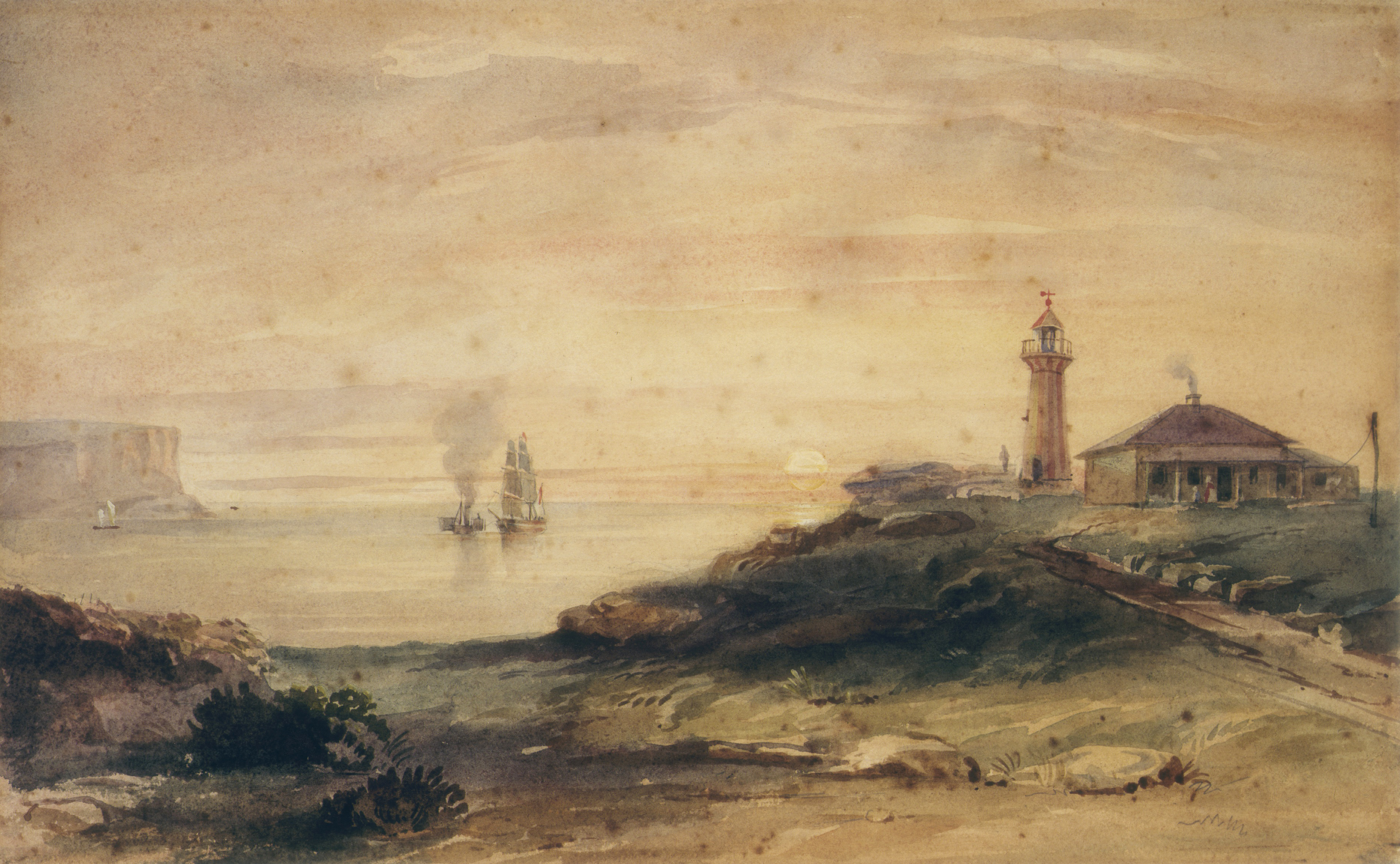
Hornby Lighthouse, South Head, Sydney, c.1840

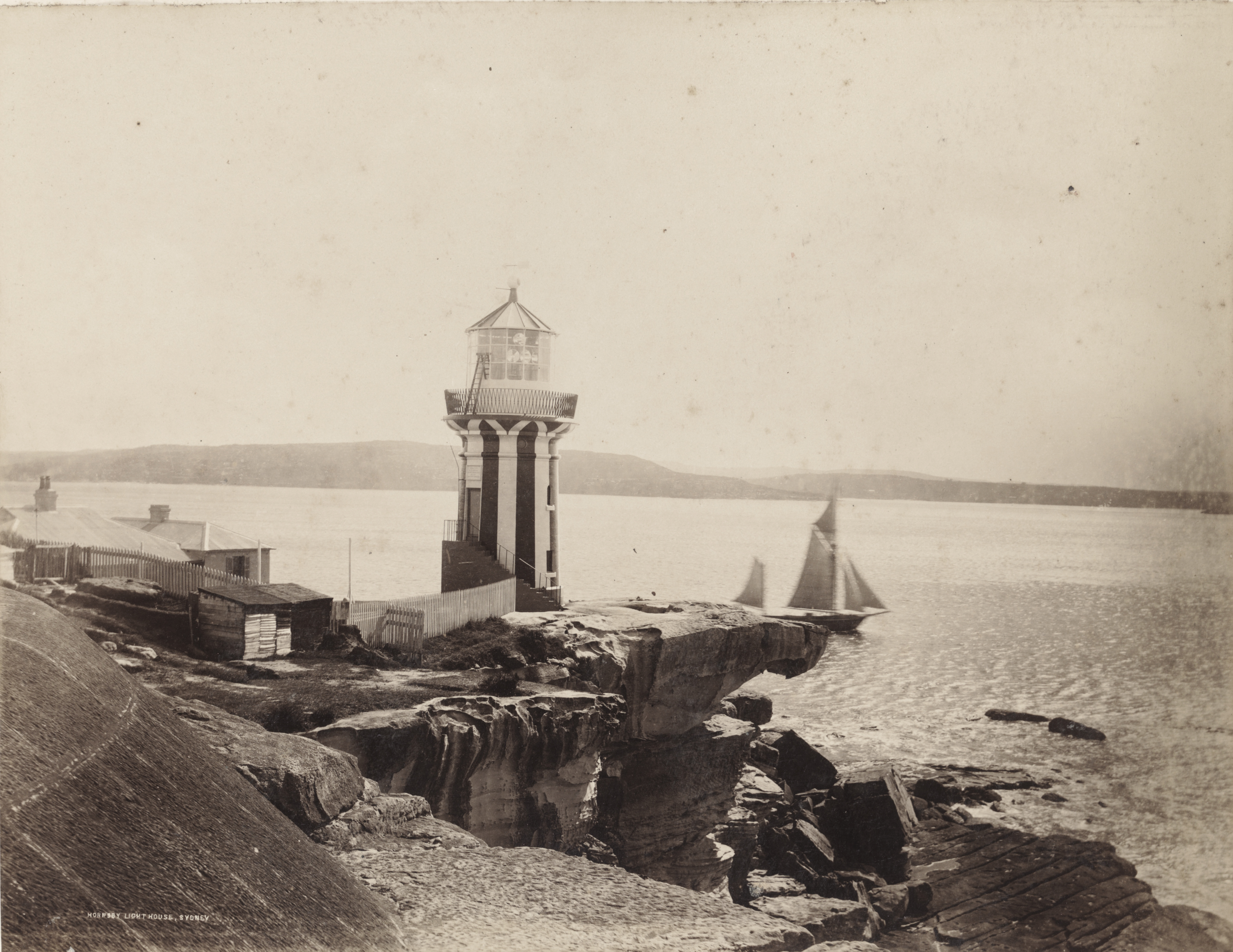
Hornby Lighthouse, 1879–82.

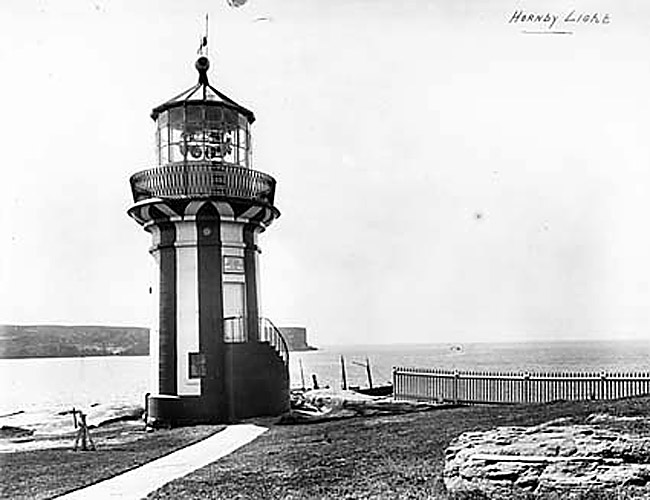
Hornby Lighthouse, 1917.

The need for a lighthouse at the entrance of Jackson Bay was made evident by the loss of two ships. First was the Dunbar, wrecked in August 1857, with the loss of 121 lives. The second was Catherine Adamson, two months later in October 1857, with a loss of twenty-one lives. The first signal station was operated close to the present site in 1790, serving as a landmark for ships to communicate their arrival to the settlement. A committee of the Light, Pilot and Navigation Board took evidence in September 1857 and recommended the construction of a 9.1-metre (30 ft) lighthouse on the inner South Head, showing a fixed white light (F.W.), although a red light was also considered.

The South Head Signal Station is a dominant Sydney landmark which appears to have been in continuous use since the 1840s as a controlling point for shipping entering and leaving Port Jackson.

A solid sandstone tower with connected watch keepers quarters built in the early 1840s and designed by the Colonial Architect Mortimer Lewis. The tower is octagonal in plan having four levels and a basement store cut 10 feet into a solid rock. The topmost level has a cantilevered iron and timber catwalk and the metal pitched roof is surmounted by an observation fleche. Decoration is minimal but the form of the shaft with simple stepping, string courses and small panel oval and square windows is typical of restrained Colonial Georgian building work. It was also reported that the government stores already had a catoptric lens apparatus available that has been purchased in 1853.

The wing for staff quarters in an "I" plan with enclosed verandahs either side. This building probably c. 1850s building having very good ashlar work to external walls with each elevation recessed within a frame of foundation, eaves and quoin mouldings. Windows are marked by simple classical sill and lintel mouldings. The hipped roofs originally of slate are now sheeted in asbestos cement. A good timber picket fence encloses the property which is in good condition and well maintained.

After coming onto the real estate market for the first time, the two-bedroom Cottage One of the Signal Station has been leased on the first inspection, by a young family. The two-bedroom cottage has its own 1795 cannon in the yard. It was built in the 1840s, has a new kitchen and bathroom, and was most recently used as housing for NSW Maritime Services personnel.

The tower construction ended in 1858, and it was the third lighthouse built in New South Wales, following Macquarie Lighthouse in 1818 and Nobbys Head Light in 1858. It was opened by Sir William Denison, Governor of New South Wales, and named after the family of his wife Caroline, daughter of Admiral Sir Phipps Hornby, though it was known as the "Lower Light", to distinguish it from Macquarie Lighthouse, the "Upper Light".

The original apparatus was a first order catoptric lens, and the light source was a kerosene lamp. Also built with the lighthouse was a sandstone keeper's cottage, also designed by Dawson. A second cottage was constructed in 1860, and two rooms were added to each of the cottages in 1877. The cottages were connected to the city water only in 1897, using stored waters until then. In 1904 the light was upgraded to incandescent gas, (Note: According to Lighthouses of Australia Inc. The Register of the National Estate states it was done in the early 1920s.) In 1933 the light was electrified, and the lighthouse was automated and demanned. In 1948 a Chance Brothers catadioptric lens was installed, and the light characteristic was changed to a rhythmic light.

Following the automation of the lighthouse in 1933, the lighthouse and cottages fell into disuse. With World War II the shoreline fell under control of the Army, and remained so until 1977, housing serving married personnel. Following classification by the National Trust in 1975, the army transferred the station to the NSW National Parks & Wildlife Service, which restored the cottages and instated caretakers. The light's current characteristic is a white light showing two seconds on, three seconds off (L.Fl.W. 5s), visible for 15 nautical miles (28 km; 17 mi). (Note: The current light source is a 12–volt 55–watt quartz halogen lamp.)

== Description ==
The site of the first navigational beacon in Australia providing warning to mariners.

A dominant Sydney landmark which appears to have been in continuous use since the 1840s as a controlling point for shipping entering and leaving Port Jackson.

A solid sandstone tower with connected watch keepers quarters built in the early 1840s and designed by the Colonial Architect Mortimer Lewis. The tower is octagonal in plan having four levels and a basement store cut 10 feet into a solid rock. The topmost level has a cantilevered iron and timber catwalk and the metal pitched roof is surmounted by an observation fleche. Decoration is minimal but the form of the shaft with simple stepping, string courses and small panel oval and square windows is typical of restrained Colonial Georgian building work. The wing for staff quarters in an "I" plan with enclosed verandahs either side. This building probably c. 1850s building having very good ashlar work to external walls with each elevation recessed within a frame of foundation, eaves and quoin mouldings. Windows are marked by simple classical sill and lintel mouldings. The hipped roofs originally of slate are now sheeted in asbestos cement. A good timber picket fence encloses the property which is in good condition and well maintained.

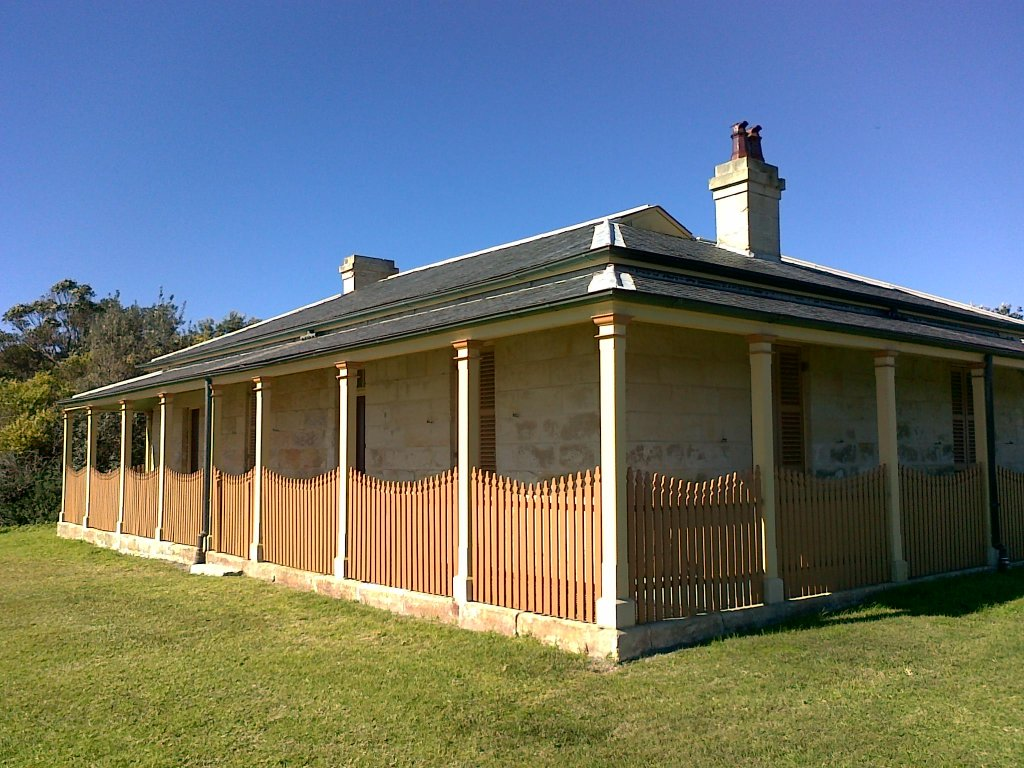
One of the keeper cottages near Hornby Lighthouse

The lighthouse is a tapered circular structure, built of curved dressed sandstone and standing 9.1 metres (30 ft) above the ground. It is painted with distinctive red and white vertical stripes. The sandstone was quarried locally.

On top of the tower is a non-ferrous metal balcony and railing, painted white, surrounded the glass-enclosed lamp.

To the west of the tower are the two Georgian style sandstone cottages, now painted, constructed from the same locally queried sandstone, and having timber verandahs and picket fences. The original slate roofing has been replaced with corrugated asbestos.

=== Condition ===
As at 26 May 1998, A good timber picket fence encloses the property which is in good condition and well maintained.

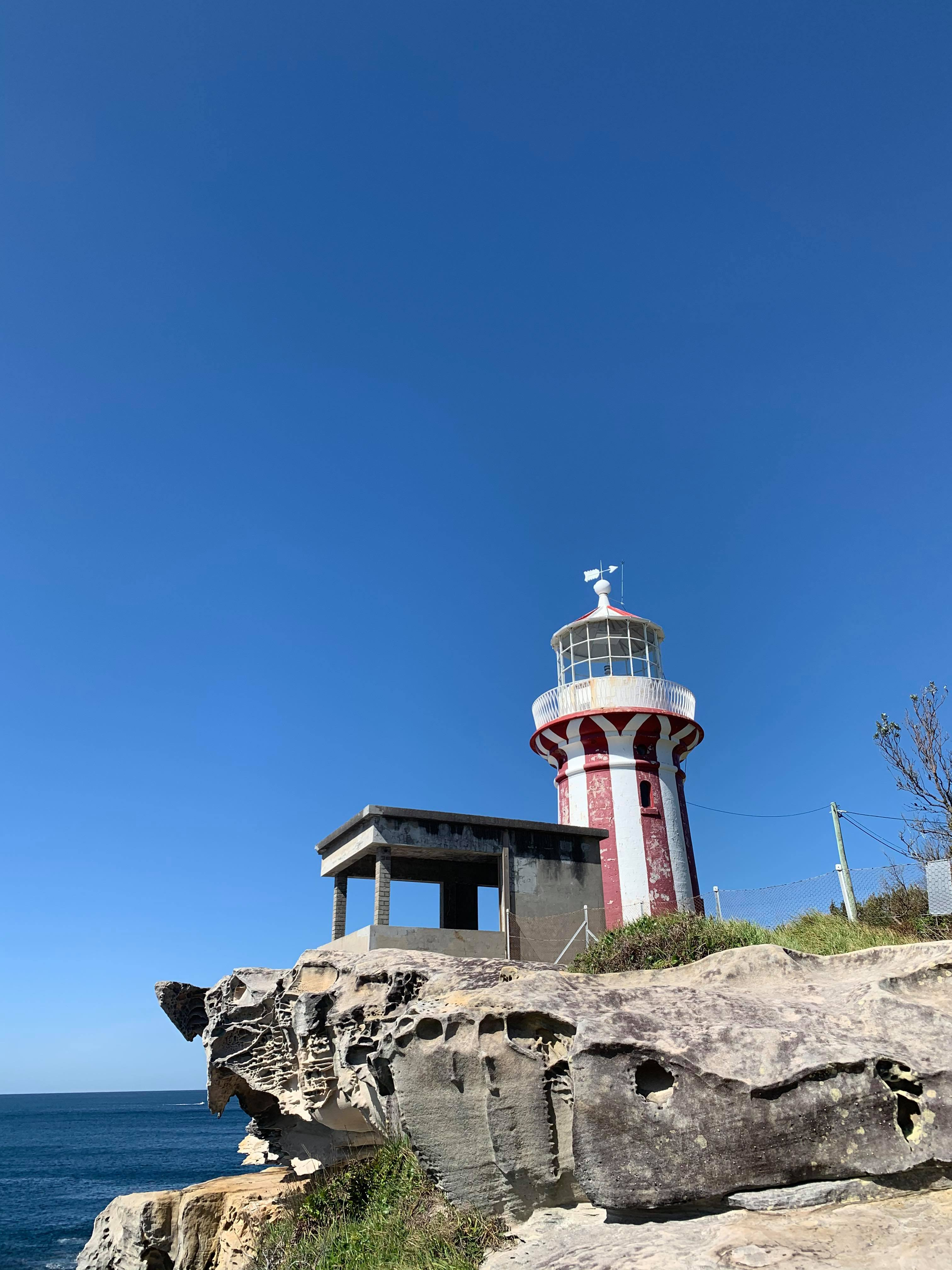
Hornby Lighthouse, 2020

=== Modifications and dates ===
The hipped roofs originally of slate are now sheeted in asbestos cement.

== Site operation ==
The light is operated by the Sydney Ports Corporation, while the site is managed by the NSW National Parks & Wildlife Service as part of the Sydney Harbour National Park. The site is open and accessible to the public, but the tower itself is closed. It can be reached by walking along the South Head Heritage Trail through Sydney Harbour National Park, starting at Camp Cove.

== Heritage listing ==
Hornby Lighthouse was listed on the New South Wales State Heritage Register on 18 April 2000.

== See also ==
- List of lighthouses in Australia
