= Newcastle East, New South Wales =

Suburb in New South Wales, Australia

Newcastle East
- Suburb
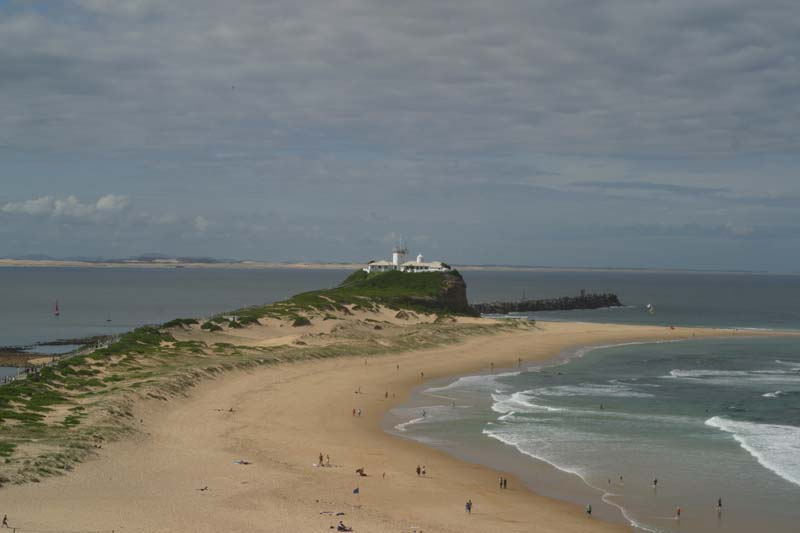
- Nobbys Head shown from Fort Scratchley^{Note1}

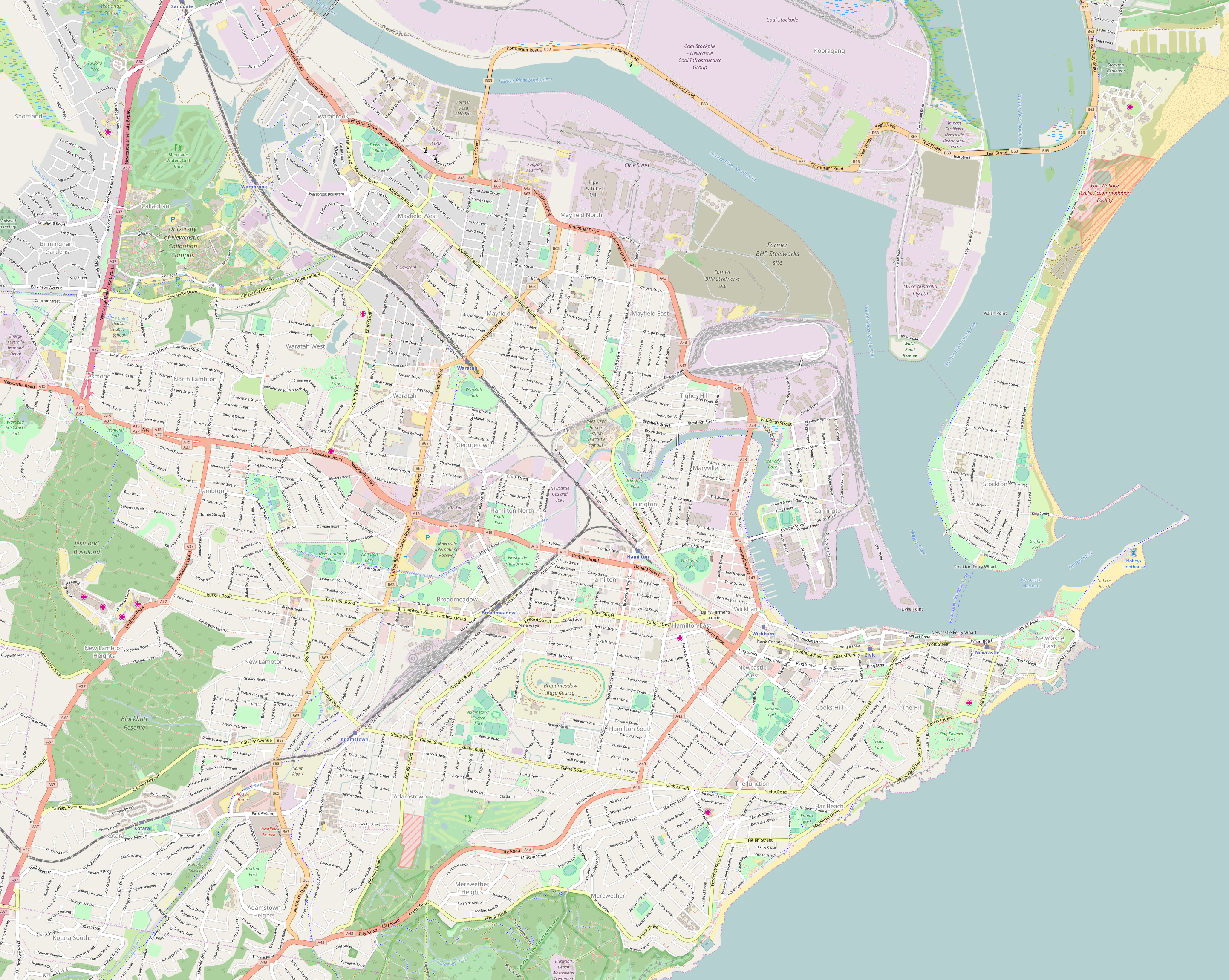
- Interactive map of Newcastle East
- Coordinates: 32°55′45″S 151°47′15.5″E
- Country: Australia
- State: New South Wales
- Region: Hunter
- City: Newcastle
- LGA: City of Newcastle
- Location: 0 km (0 mi) E of Newcastle

Government
  - State electorate: Newcastle
  - Federal division: Newcastle

Area^{Note3}
  - Total: 0.4 km^{2} (0.15 sq mi)

Population
  - Total: 1,061 (2021 census)
  - Density: 8,552/km^{2} (22,150/sq mi)^{Note2}
- Postcode: 2300
- County: Northumberland
- Parish: Newcastle
Suburbs around Newcastle East
| Hunter River | Hunter River | Hunter River, Pacific Ocean |
| Newcastle | Newcastle East | Pacific Ocean |
| Newcastle | Pacific Ocean | Pacific Ocean |

Newcastle East is an inner city suburb of Newcastle, New South Wales, Australia, located immediately east of Newcastle's central business district at the mouth of the Hunter River. The Awabakal and Worimi peoples are acknowledged by City of Newcastle as the descendants of the traditional custodians of the land situated within the Newcastle local government area, including wetlands, rivers creeks and coastal environments. It is known that their heritage and cultural ties to Newcastle date back tens of thousands of years. The suburb includes Fort Scratchley, Newcastle Ocean Baths and Newcastle Beach. Formerly a site of heavy industry and railway yards, the suburb now contains the large Foreshore Park, and historic terraced housing.

== Beaches ==
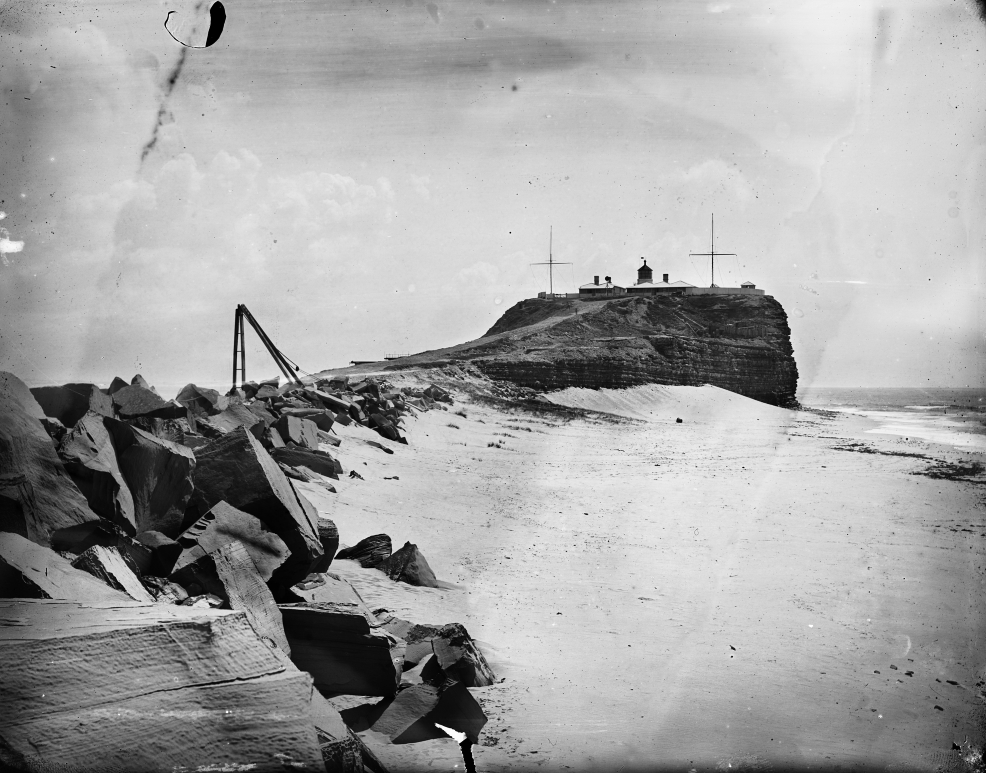
Nobbys beach circa 1900

Newcastle East is home to two of Newcastle's beaches, Nobbys Beach and Newcastle Beach, both of which have surf lifesaving clubs and are patrolled by lifesavers. In June 2007, the bulk carrier Pasha Bulker grounded itself off Nobbys Beach in a storm. Between Newcastle and Nobbys beaches lie the Newcastle Ocean Baths.

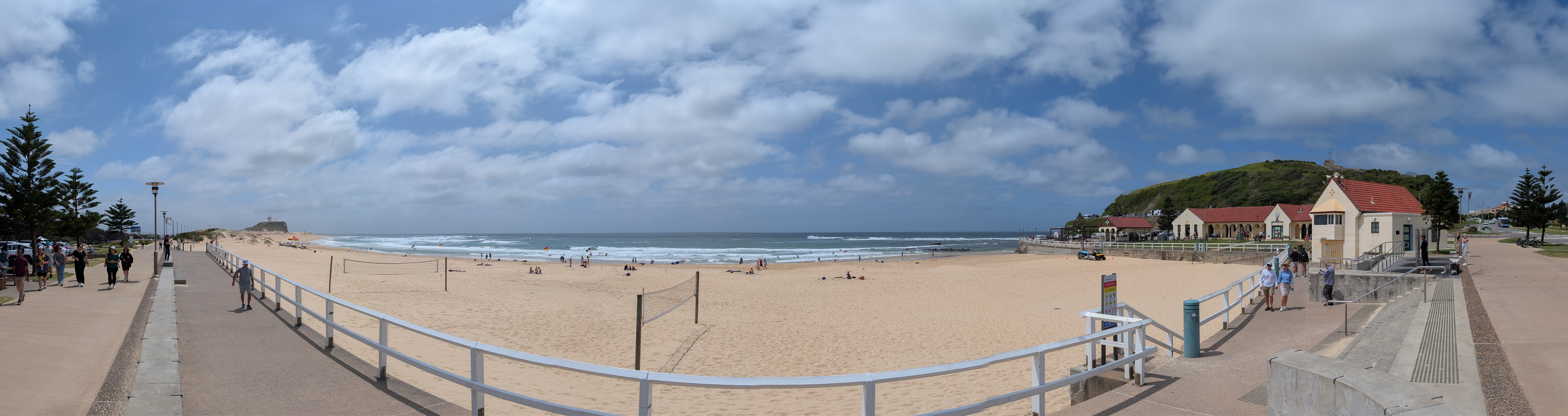
Panoramic view of Nobbys Beach in 2025

== Fort Scratchley ==
Fort Scratchley is a fort atop a knoll overlooking Nobbys Beach. It was designed by Lt. Col. Peter Scratchley and built between 1881 and 1886. While its original purpose was to protect the colony against a feared Russian invasion, its most prominent role came during World War II when the guns at the fort fired upon a Japanese submarine which shelled the city in 1942. The military role of the fort came to an end in 1972 and it now houses the Newcastle Region Maritime and Military Museum. Damage from the Japanese Navy attack during World War II can still be seen on the front of some of the buildings in East End. Today Fort Scratchley is a visitor attraction with views of the city and coastline, displays of military artefacts, and tunnel tours. Fort Scratchley also has a library of military books operated by the Fort Scratchley Historical Society.

== Demographics ==
Historical population
| Year | Pop. | ±% |
|---|---|---|
| 2001 | 914 | — |
| 2006 | 975 | +6.7% |
| 2011 | 991 | +1.6% |
| 2016 | 1,004 | +1.3% |
| 2021 | 1,061 | +5.7% |

According to the 2021 census, the suburb has a population of 1061, of which 49% are male, and 51% are female. The median age lies at 47, nine years over the national average.

76.5% of the population was born in Australia. Most common other countries of birth were England (4.1%), New Zealand (2.2%) and the Philippines (0.9%).

82.8% of the population stated that they only speak English at home. The next most spoken language is Spanish, with 1.5% of the population speaking it.

== Motor racing ==
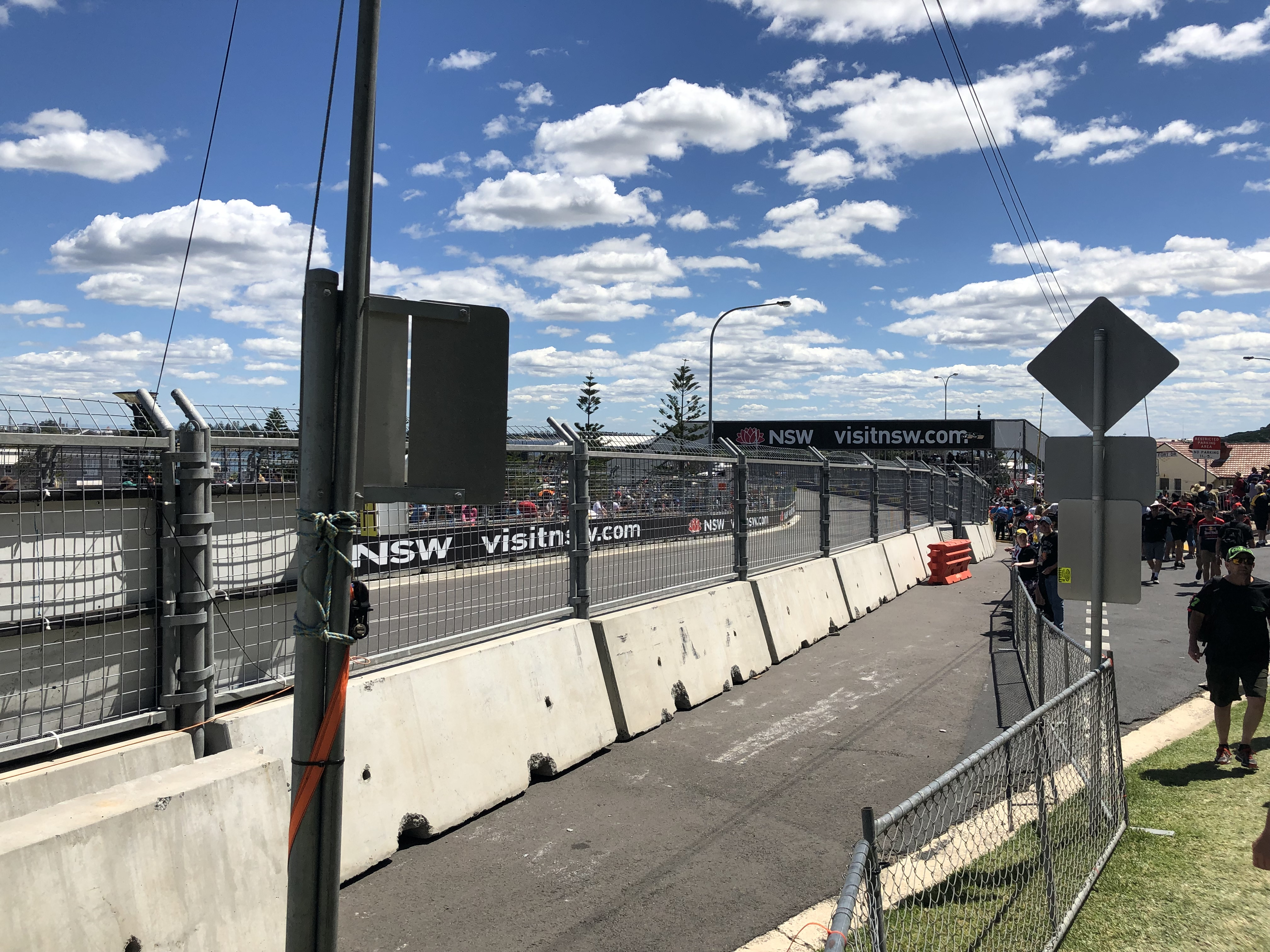
Newcastle East has hosted the Newcastle 500 since 2017. Nobbys Road was extended to create the circuit.

The Newcastle Street Circuit, a temporary Supercars Championship circuit first used in 2017 for the Newcastle 500, passes through Newcastle East. Foreshore Park was also used as a concert venue as part of the inaugural event, with acts including Delta Goodrem and Cold Chisel performing.

== Heritage listings ==
Newcastle East has a number of heritage-listed sites, including:

- 16 Telford Street: Earp Gillam Bond Store

== Notes ==
1. Although Nobbys Head is arguably the best known landmark in Newcastle East, technically it isn't in the suburb.
2. The density figure presented represents the density in the populated section of the suburb. (see Note 3)
3. Most of the suburb (approximately 72%) is occupied by coastal roads and beaches, Foreshore Park and the Fort Scratchley maritime and military museum. Only 28% of the suburb is continuously populated.
