= Nods =

Nods may refer to:

- Nods, Switzerland
- Nods, Doubs, France

== See also ==
- NOD (disambiguation)
- Noddies (disambiguation)
