= Network of Disclosure =

- Official Network of Disclosure Logo
- Abbreviation: NOD
- Purpose: A group of comic book dealers and collectors who pledged to disclose any form of restoration or enhancement, known to exist, on a comic book whose ownership is to be transferred to another party through sale, trade or gift.
- Headquarters: Virtual (web)
- Main organ: Board of Directors

The Network of Disclosure (also called NOD) was a group of comic book dealers and collectors who pledged to disclose any form of restoration or enhancement, known to exist, on a comic book whose ownership is to be transferred to another party through sale, trade or gift. The NOD, founded in early 2006, was the only comic book collecting educational organization in the world. The objective of the organization was to create a safer and more open environment for those buying and selling comic books. By publicly sharing this type of history of each of these books with fellow collectors and customers, the group sought to foster both a greater level of confidence and sense of security within the marketplace.

The organization was composed of members from across the globe. Notable members (founders in bold) included the following: Charter Member Brent Moeshlin, Quality Comix; Charter Member Marnin Rosenberg, Collectors Assemble / Comic Collectors; Senior Overstreet Advisor, Charter Member Mark Zaid, Esquire Comics, Overstreet Advisor; notable restoration expert/Charter Member Susan Cicconi, The Restoration Lab; and NOD Logo Copyright owner Charter Member Brad Hamann, Brad Hamann Illustration & Design. In March 2009 the NOD became a non-profit organization.

On December 12, 2009, the members of the Network of Disclosure voted to change the name and mission statement of the organization and to replace the existing membership guidelines with a new code of ethics. As a result of this ballot, the Network of Disclosure effectively ceased to exist and a new organization with a broader mission and focus was created in its place. This new organization, the Comic Book Collecting Association (CBCA) was announced to the public on February 22, 2010.

== Controversy ==
NOD was the object of controversy in the comic collecting hobby due to the organization's strong stand against non-disclosure practices of some sellers in the hobby. This controversy stems from the conflict between those that feel certain forms of "enhancement" (restoration to some) should be disclosed and those that do not agree that these procedures should be proactively disclosed.

== Organization's principles ==
Integrity - NOD members believed in an ethical standard that rises to the highest levels. Usage of the NOD logo by sellers denotes a level of trust that can be readily accepted by buyers even when no prior interaction existed between the two individuals. Participation in NOD by all members demonstrates adoption to strict codes of conduct that instills ideals that promotes the betterment of the hobby.

Security - Involvement in the NOD required a degree of openness that exists nowhere else. Disclosure of important information to a prospective buyer creates a greater sense of security and trust to minimize concerns and ensure complete satisfaction with a transaction, both immediately and thereafter.

Education - A smart buyer is an educated buyer. NOD promoted that all buyers, whether collectors, investors or dealers, should have all relevant substantive information at their disposal when contemplating decisions impacting their purchases. Education ensures intelligent decisions, and intelligent decisions lead to positive and repeat transactions that further the continuation and enjoyment of the hobby.

== Membership guidelines for disclosure ==
Proactively disclose any restoration or enhancements done to a comic book including, but not limited to, any of the following:

- Glue
- Tape
- Tear seal
- Color touch
- Piece replacement
- Page replacement
- Page whitening/bleaching
- Staple removal, replacement, or cleaning
- Cleaning (aqueous, solvent or dry erasure)
- Pressing (Intact, localized or disassembled)
- Trimming
- Deacidification
- Cover re-glossing
- Restoration removal (tape, glue, tissue or color touch)
