= Nobbys Tuff =

Geologic formation in Australia

- Stratigraphic range: Wuchiapingian
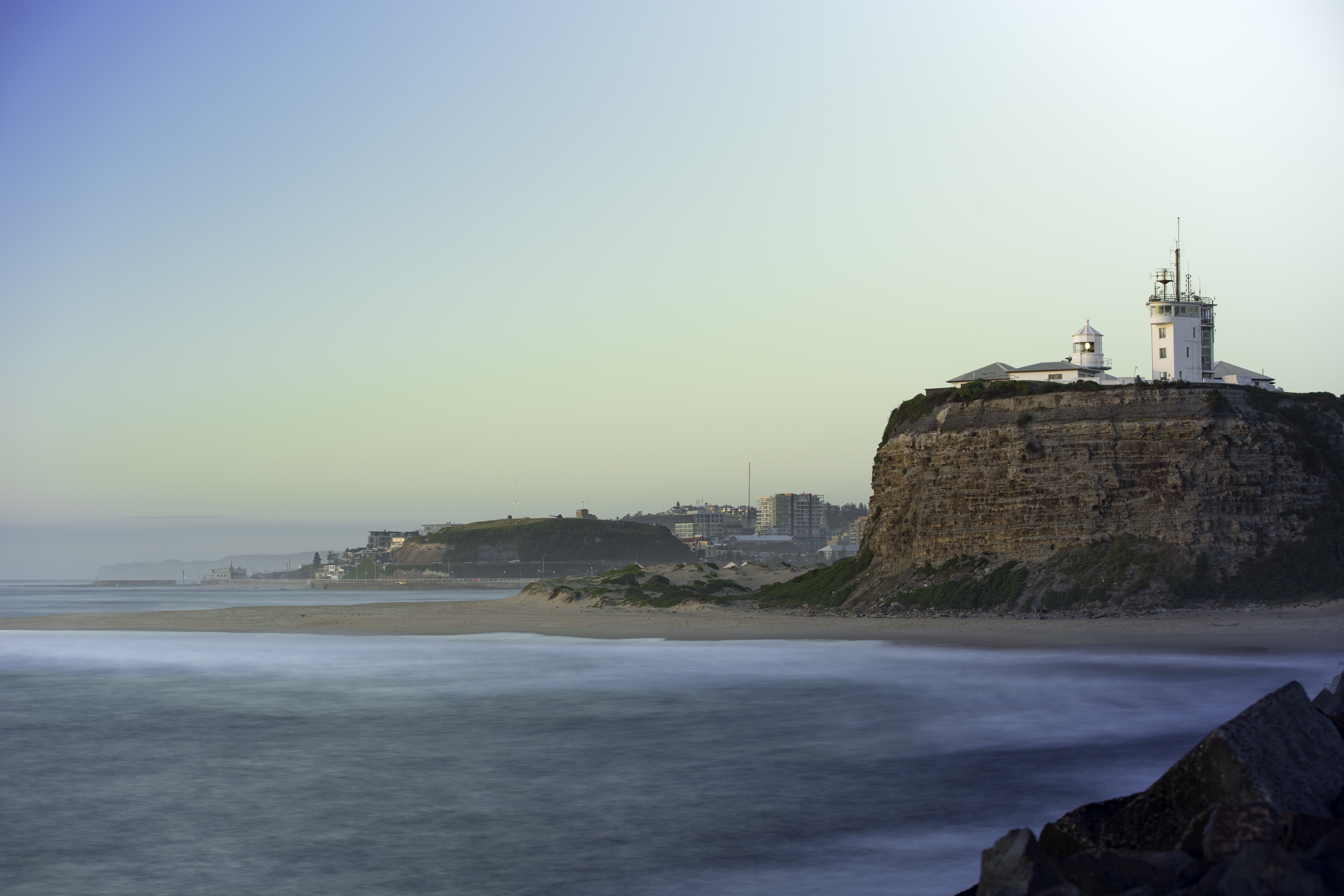
- Nobbys Head, Newcastle
- Type: Geological formation
- Thickness: up to 25 metres (80 ft)

Location
- Region: Lachlan Orogen
- Country: Australia

Type section
- Named for: Nobbys Head

Nobbys Tuff is a geologic formation in eastern Australia. Found in Newcastle within the Lachlan Orogen, this stratum is up to 25 metres thick. Formed from volcanic ash in an eruption in the Wuchiapingian age, in the late Permian around 255.02 Ma. This formation includes tuff, tuffaceous sandstone, tuffaceous siltstone, claystone, and chert. Often noticed at Nobbys Head in Newcastle.

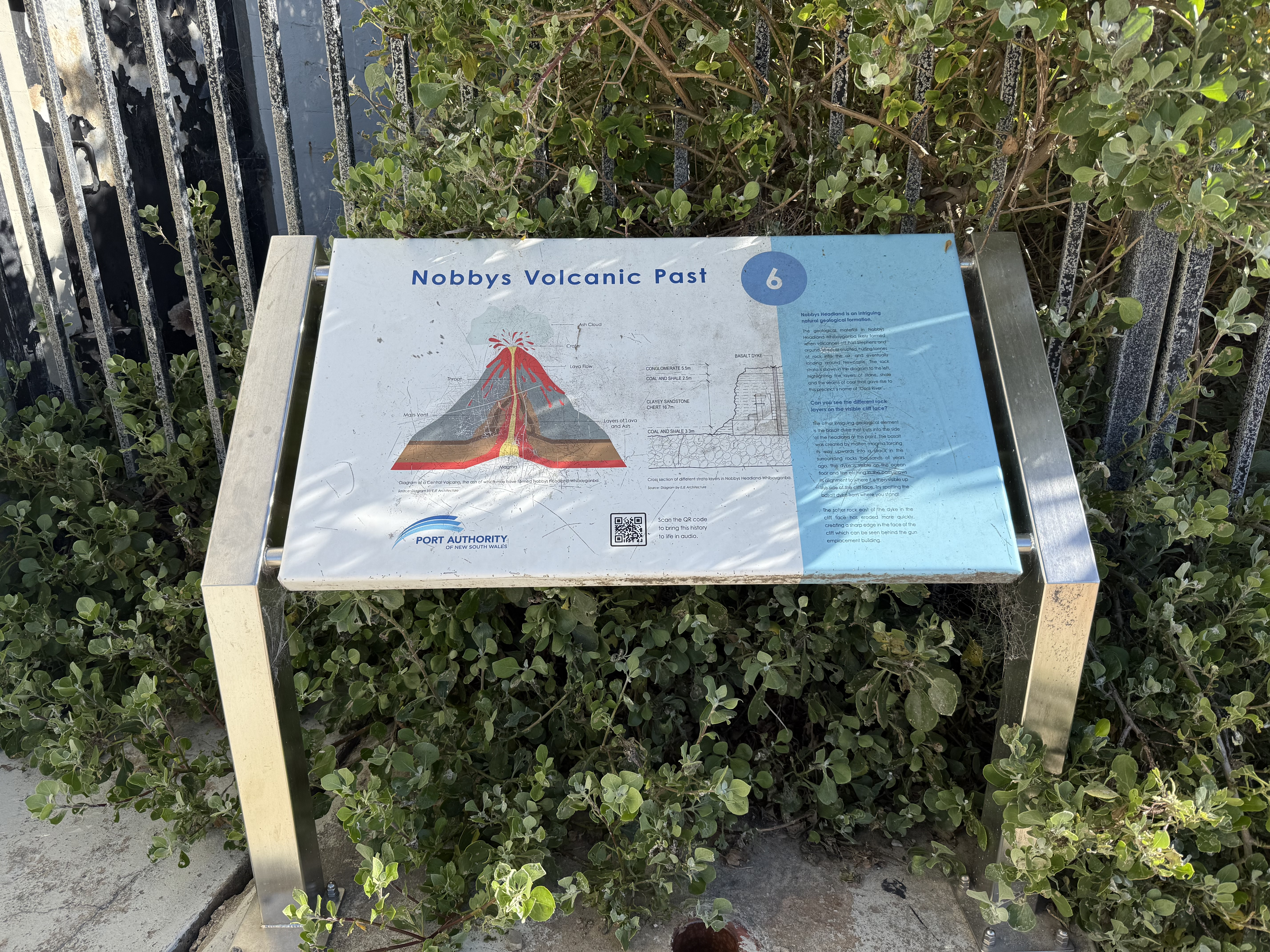
Nobbys volcanic past information sign, December 2025

== See also ==
- Newcastle Coal Measures
- Lachlan Orogen
