= NOD =

NOD, Nod, or nod may refer to:

== Literature ==
- Land of Nod, a place mentioned in the biblical book of Genesis
- Nod, a fictional character from the poem "Wynken, Blynken, and Nod"

== Science ==
- Night Observation Device or night vision device
- Non-occlusive disease (NOD), a disease affecting the intestine. It is characterized by mesenteric ischemia without occlusion.
- NOD mice (non-obese diabetic mice), a strain of mice genetically prone to develop diabetes
- NOD32, a software antivirus application from ESET software
- Nod factor (nodulation factor), signaling molecules produced by rhizobia during the initiation of nodules on the root of legumes
- NOD-like receptor, components of the innate immune system
- A member of the Nucleotide-binding oligomerization domain-containing protein family
  - Nucleotide-binding oligomerization domain-containing protein 1 (NOD1), a receptor protein that recognizes foreign molecules
  - Nucleotide-binding oligomerization domain-containing protein 2 (NOD2), another receptor protein that recognizes foreign molecules

== Other ==
- Nod (gesture), a head gesture
- Northern Thai language, ISO 639-3 language code
- Nation of Domination, a former stable in the World Wrestling Federation
- Network of Disclosure, an organization concerned with the condition of comic books
- Night of Decadence, a campus party at Rice University in Houston, Texas, USA
- Notice of default, a notice given to a borrower regarding failure to pay debt
- Nintendo optical disc, a type of media used by the Nintendo GameCube and Wii
- Nod, the original name of former Atlanta-based power pop band Raves
- Nod, a Nodosaurus in The Land Before Time
- NOD, abbreviation for Национально-освободительное движение (National Liberation Movement), a right-wing political movement in Russia
- Brotherhood of Nod, a faction from Command & Conquer
- Chananporn Rosjan, Thai beauty pageant titleholder

== See also ==
- Nods (disambiguation)
