= Nobbys Head =

Headland in Australia

Whibayganba Nickname: Coal Island
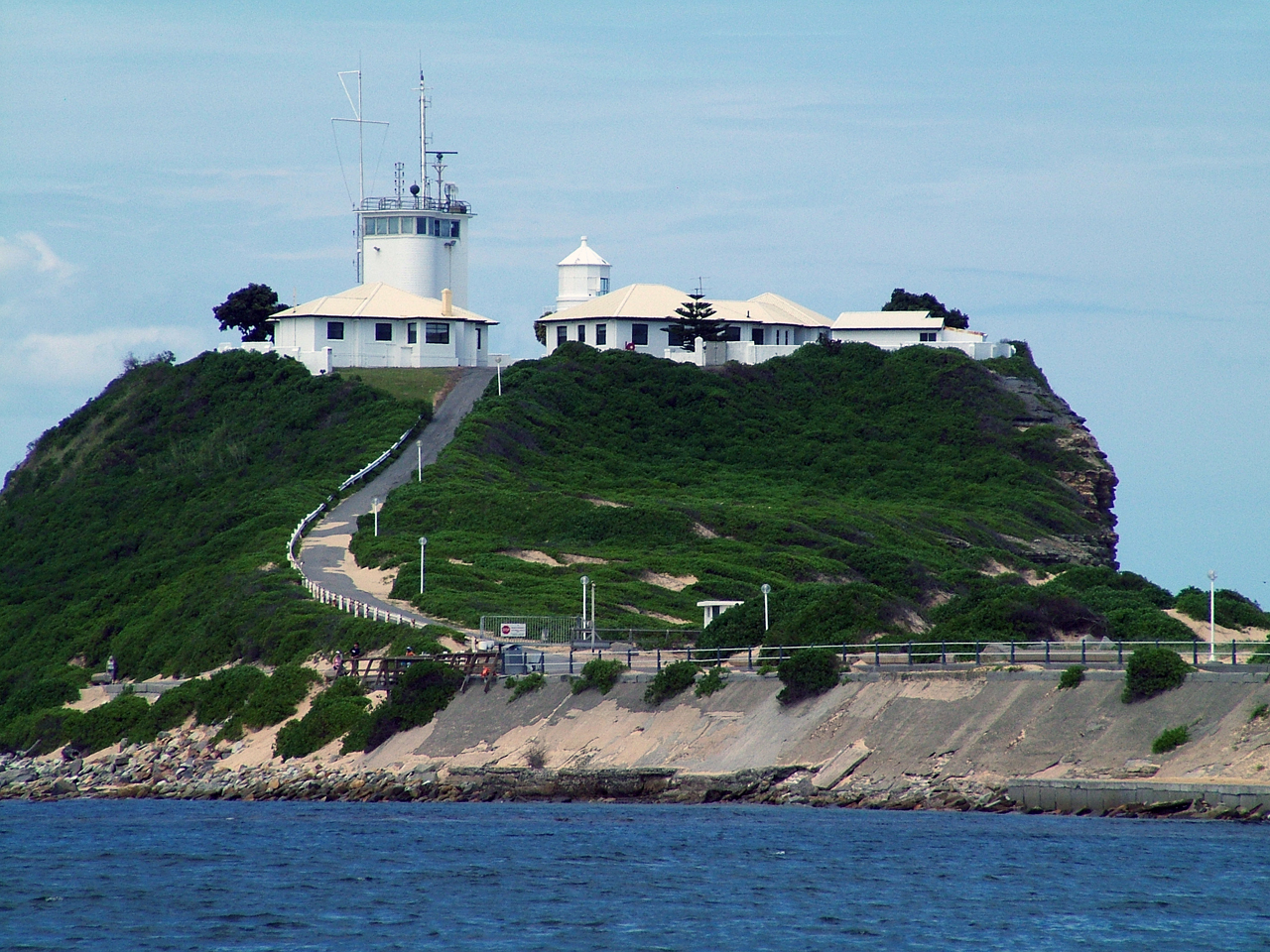
- Nobbys Head, Newcastle
- Interactive map of Nobbys Head

Geography
- Coordinates: 32°55′24″S 151°48′04″E

Administration
- Australia
- State: New South Wales
- City: Newcastle

Additional information
- Time zone: AEST (UTC+10)
  - Summer (DST): AEDT (UTC+11)
- Official website: Newcastle City Council webpage

Nobbys Head (Aboriginal and dual name: Whibayganba) is a headland located on the southern entrance to Newcastle Harbour, New South Wales, Australia. The headland is situated above the Hunter River and the Tasman Sea of the South Pacific Ocean.

Originally called Whibayganba by the Awabakal people, European colonists referred to it as Coal Island, and then later Nobbys Island. The Island was connected to the mainland at first by the Macquarie Pier, completed in 1846, 38 years after commencement. The pier was eventually replaced by a breakwater. Sand accumulated along the breakwall to make Nobby's beach, and the sand and plants makes the isthmus appear natural.

The rock consisting of Nobbys Tuff of the original island has significant tunnelling, which was completed during the 1850s using convict labour, with the aim of destroying the island.

Nobbys Head Lighthouse is located on the headland. The lighthouse is the third lighthouse built in New South Wales after the Macquarie Lighthouse in 1818 and the Hornby Lighthouse which was also built in 1858. The lighthouse is included in Newcastle's coat of arms.

== Aboriginal history ==
The Awabakal and Worimi peoples are acknowledged by City of Newcastle as the descendants of the traditional custodians of the land situated within the Newcastle local government area, including wetlands, rivers creeks and coastal environments. The Awabakal people knew Nobby's Head as Whibayganba. The name Whibayganba was documented in an 1828 sketch by Sir Thomas Mitchell. This rock formation holds significance to the Awabakal and is a part of their dreaming stories.

== Macquarie Pier ==
Captain James Wallis proposed to Governor Lachlan Macquarie the need for a causeway or land bridge across the channel to link Nobbys to the mainland. In August 1818 surveyor James Meehan made the plans for the pier. The foundation stone was laid by Lachlan Macquarie on 5 August 1818. Commandant Captain James Wallis visited the pier during one of his visits to Newcastle on 5 August 1818. On 11 October 1832, a Report of the Sub-Committee on the Breakwater at Newcastle had been received by the Legislative Committee over the budget of £.500. The pier was built of Roman Cement and was completed by 1846. On 12 June 1846 Mr Scott, the clerk of work was the first person to walk the length of the Breakwater to Nobby's Island. By 1866 the decision was made to reconstruct the breakwater with stone quarried from Waratah and transported by rail.

The location of the foundation is unknown but a modern plaque was placed in 2010 where people believed it was to mark the Macquarie 2010 celebrations. The 2010 plaque was designed by Auchmuty Library designer Danylo Motyka. On 13 August 2013 with funding from the New South Wales government geophysicist from GBG Australia began a subsurface investigation using ground penetrating radar and electrical resistivity located the buried structure. The electrical resistivity found evidence of a possible human construction around 1 metre below the surface.

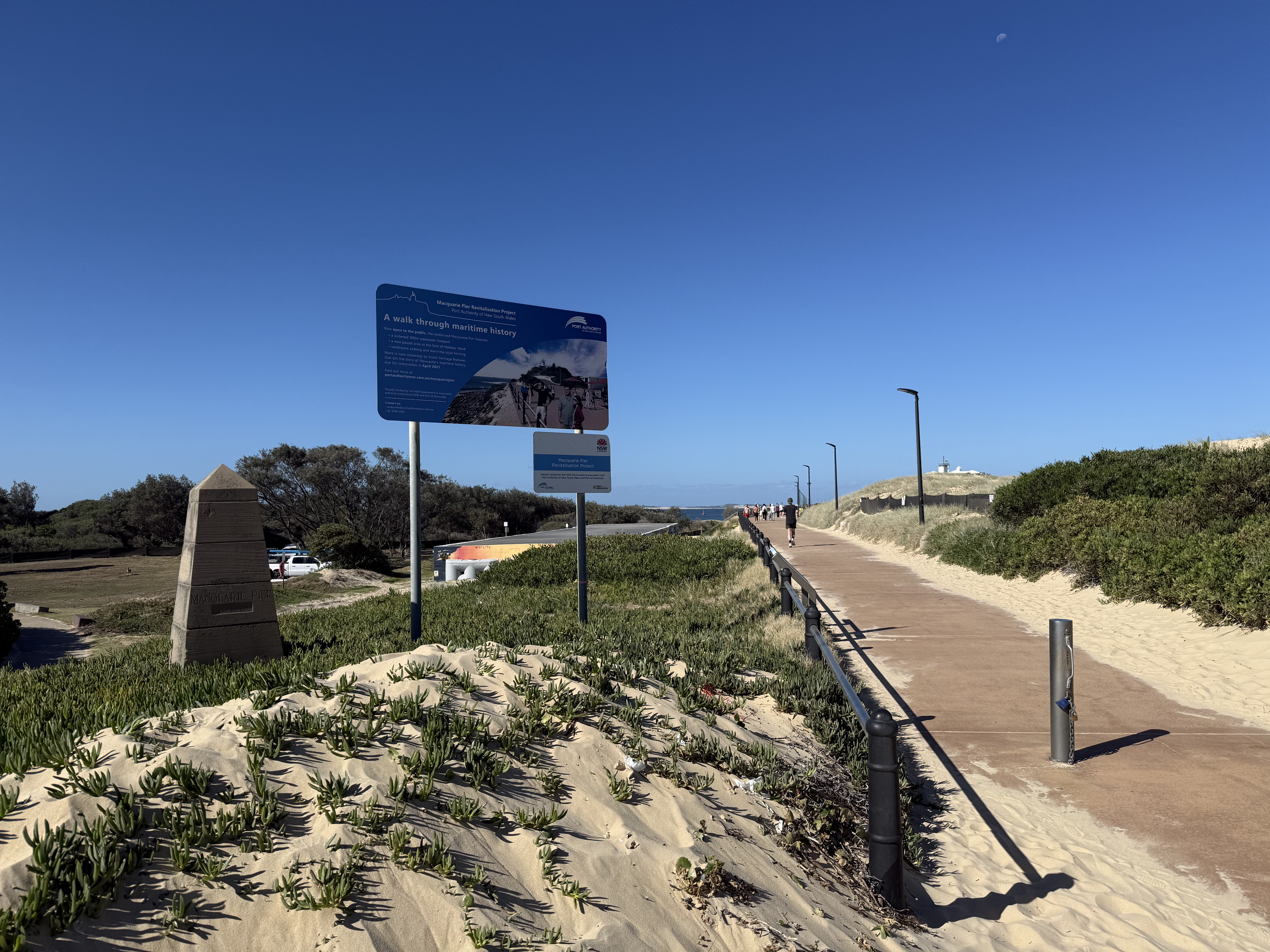
Macquarie Pier Revitalisation Project sign at Nobbys Head, December 2025

In 2020, Newcastle City Council announced the Macquarie Pier Revitalisation Project, with the Port Authority spending $3 million to widen the pathway, adding sandstone seating, fencing and heritage features along the 900 metre route.

== Location and features ==
Nobbys Head was first sighted by Europeans on 10 May 1770 by Captain James Cook from the ship Endeavour and was described by Cook as:

"A small round rock or Island, laying close under the land, bore South 82 degrees West, distance 3 or 4 Leagues".

It was not until the discovery of coal by Lt. John Shortland in 1797 that the island was viewed as having any significance. In 1804, Signal Head was the first place in Newcastle that any form of navigational aid was established. Originally a coal-burning light, it was changed over to oil in 1821 for a short period of time but was reverted to coal as the oil system was not reliable.

Governor Macquarie ordered a pier to be built to join Coal island to Collier Point. The pier was started on 5 August 1818 and convict labour was used to do the construction. It took 38 years to complete the pier and, during this time, numerous convicts were lost to the sea due to the convicts having to work through all sea and weather conditions, night and day.

Nobbys Head was thought to have been originally 62 metres (203 ft) high; however, work done by the Coal River Working Party in 2010 has concluded that the original height was more likely 43 m (141 ft) high. It was reduced to its current 27.5 m (90 ft) height because sailing ships were losing wind in the sails as they rounded Nobbys Head. The rock taken from Nobbys to reduce its height was used in the pier's construction.

In 2010, it was reported that the NSW Government was examining the transfer of management of the headland from Newcastle Port Corporation to the Land Property Management Authority for potential incorporation in a national park or reserve.

A location on Mars was named after Nobbys Head. NASA also agreed to update it to reflect its dual naming Whibayganba.

== Gallery ==
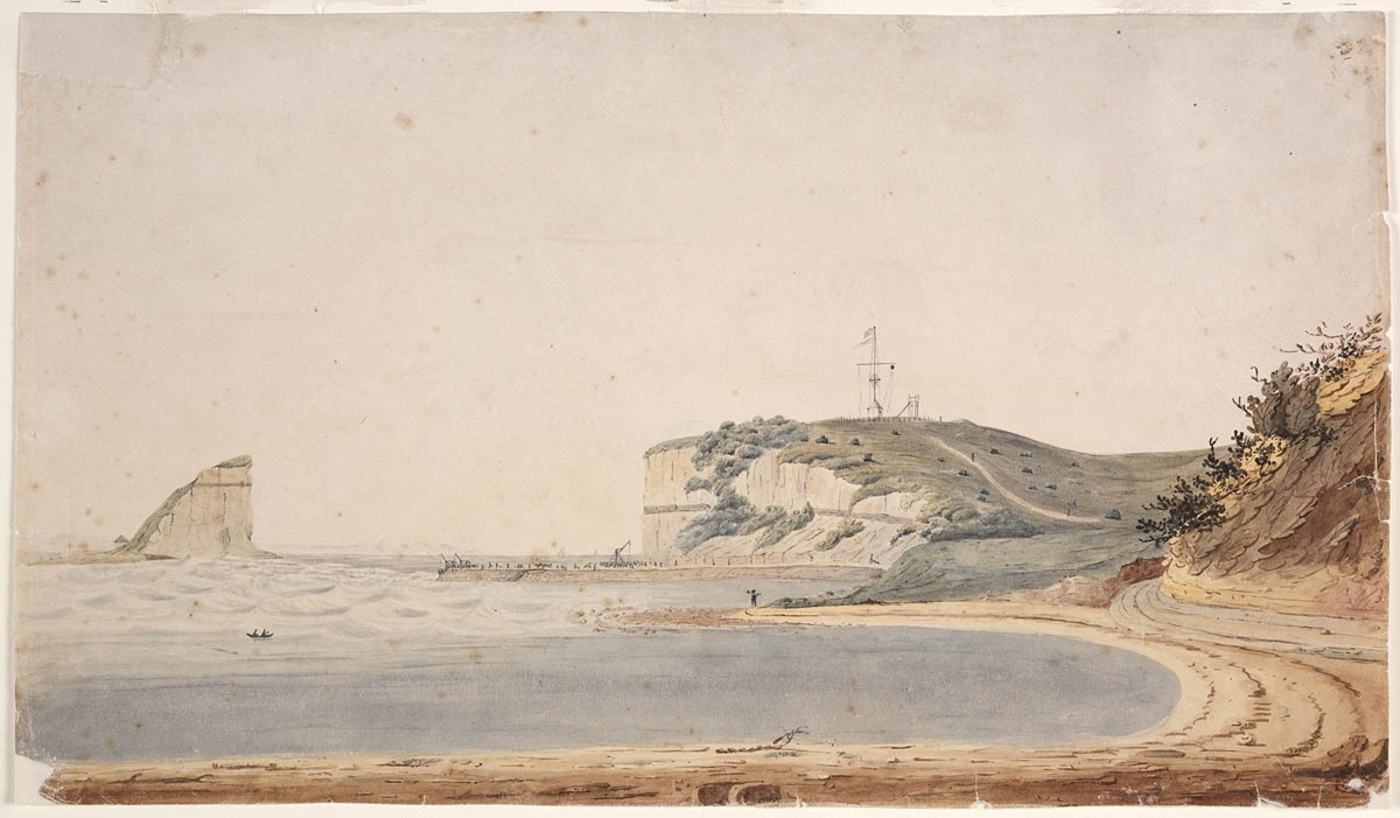
Nobby's Island and pier, Newcastle, 23 January 1820 / [watercolour by unknown artist]

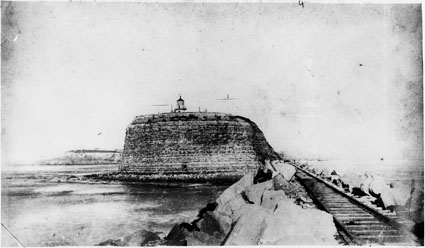
Nobbys Head, 1887

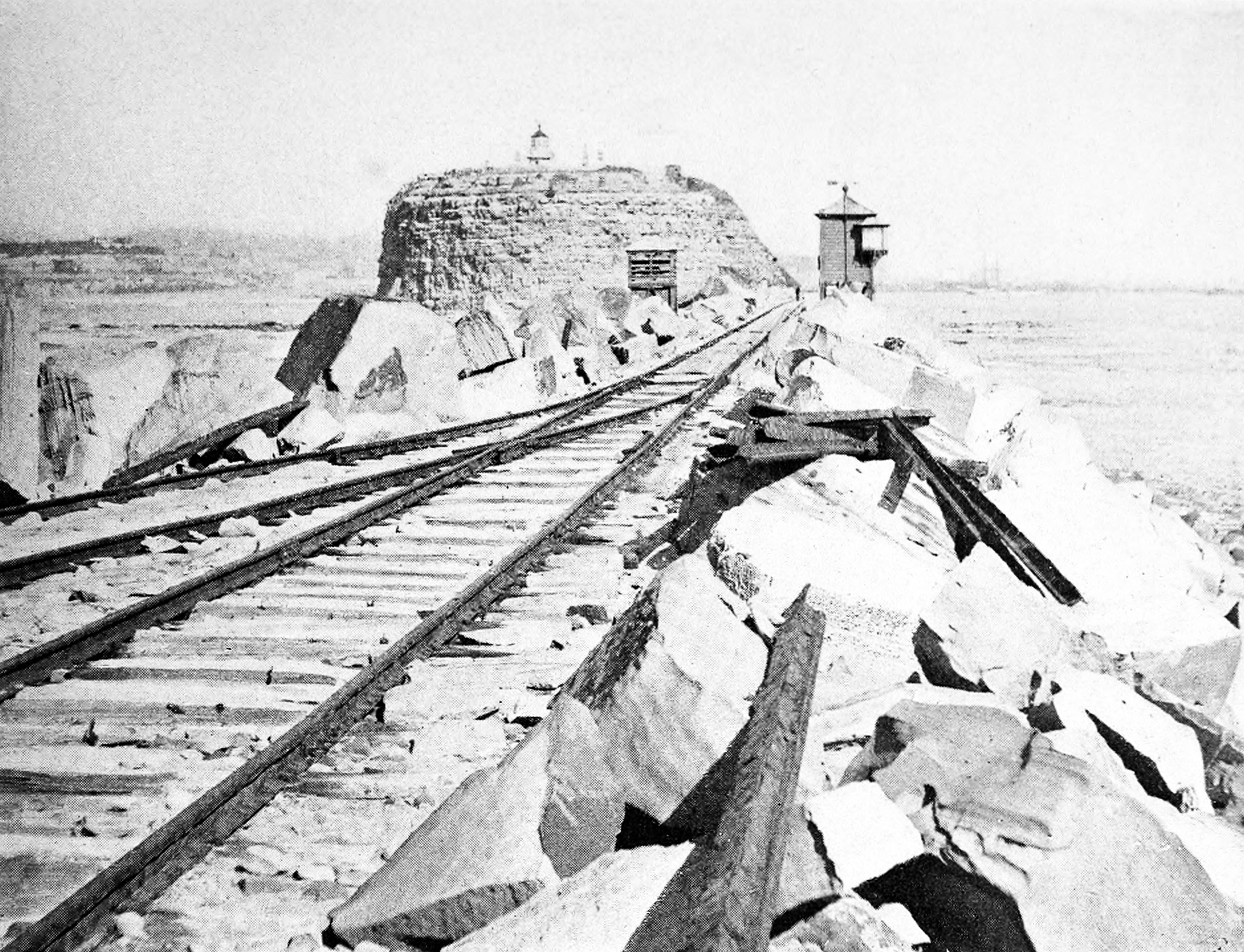
Nobbys Head, 1891

== See also ==
- Geography of New South Wales
