= Nod shot =

Camera reaction shot

A video interview that includes nod shots from the interviewer

A nod shot, noddy headshot or noddy is a type of camera reaction shot used in recorded news or current affairs interviews. They consist of nods and other similar "listening gestures" made by the interviewer. If only one camera is available at the interview site, then these shots are recorded after the actual interview takes place. The shots are spliced into the interview during the editing process to mask any cuts that have been made. This editing technique is almost universally "read" by audiences as expressing realism and therefore creates the illusion of a seamless dialogue in the interview.

The earliest use of the term recorded by the Oxford English Dictionary dates from 1982. It was explained more fully by John Fiske in 1987:

the camera is then turned onto the interviewer who asks some of the questions again and gives a series of "noddies," that is, reaction shots, nods, smiles, or expressions of sympathetic listening. These are then used to disguise later edits in the interviewee's speech... Without the "noddy", the visuals would show an obvious "jump" that would reveal the edit.

== Controversial use ==
In the United Kingdom, the term came to public prominence in 2007 when it was revealed that a BBC programme inserted noddies featuring the senior broadcaster Alan Yentob into interviews that he did not conduct, creating the impression that he had been present. This controversy, which was covered in many newspapers as Noddygate, came at a time when the BBC was already under scrutiny for falsifying certain aspects of entertainment shows for editorial reasons. These scandals prompted several British broadcasters to reevaluate the use of trick editing on their news programmes.

== See also ==
- Cutaway (filmmaking)
