= Nobbys Head Light =

Lighthouse in New South Wales, Australia

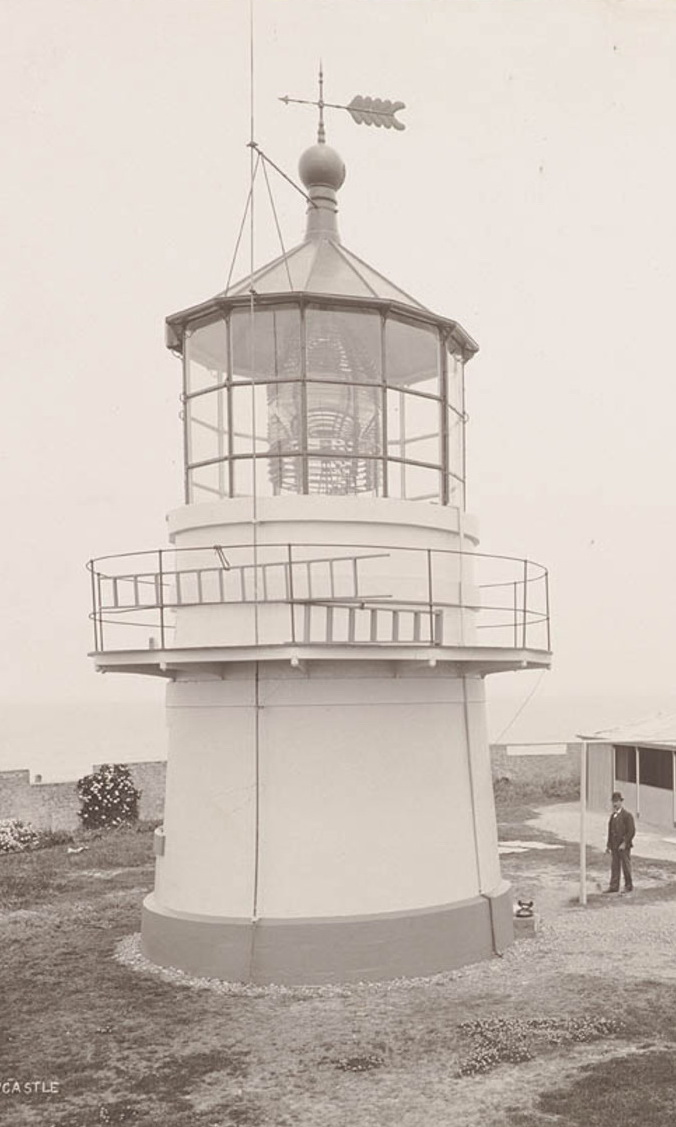
- Nobbys Head Light, 1902
- Location: Nobbys Head, Newcastle, New South Wales, Australia
- Coordinates: 32°55′6.86″S 151°47′54.27″E

Tower
- Constructed: 1821 (first)
- Construction: dressed sandstone
- Automated: 1935
- Height: 9.8 metres (32 ft) (Note: According to List of Lights. "Lighthouses of Australia" says 35 metres (115 ft).)
- Shape: cylindrical tower with balcony and lantern
- Markings: white tower and lantern
- Operator: Australian Maritime Safety Authority
- Heritage: listed on the Commonwealth Heritage List
- Fog signal: siren: 1 blast every 20s.

Light
- First lit: 1858 (current) (Note: According to "Lighthouses of Australia". Directory of Lighthouses says 1854.)
- Focal height: 35 metres (115 ft) (Note: According to List of Lights. "Lighthouses of Australia" says 25 metres (82 ft).)
- Intensity: 580,000 cd
- Range: 24 nmi (44 km; 28 mi)
- Characteristic: Fl (3) W 20s.

Commonwealth Heritage List
- Official name: Nobbys Lighthouse
- Type: Historic
- Criteria: A.1, A.4, B.2, F.1, G.1
- Designated: 22 June 2004
- Reference no.: 105373

Nobbys Head Light is an active lighthouse on Nobbys Head, a headland on the south side of the entrance to Newcastle Harbour, New South Wales, Australia. An image of the lighthouse is included in the coat of arms of the City of Newcastle.

The lighthouse is operated by the Newcastle Port Corporation. The headland is managed by the Land Property Management Authority and is open to the public Sundays from 10am to 4pm.

== History ==
The first beacon in the area was an open coal fire set on Signal Head, with a range of 7 kilometres (4.3 mi; 3.8 nmi). This was changed in 1821 to a large metal device burning oil, which was visible for 12 kilometres (7.5 mi; 6.5 nmi), but shortly reverted to coal as the oil system was not reliable.

By 1846 Nobbys Head, originally a small islet more than 60 metres (200 ft) high, was connected to the mainland with a causeway. The island was reduced in height to improve the sailing conditions and to accommodate a lighthouse and signal station, built in 1858. The lighthouse was designed by Alexander Dawson, the New South Wales Government Architect. The original light had an intensity of 20,000 cd and was attended by three lighthouse keepers.

In 1934 the light was electrified and automated.

The current light source is a 120-electronvolt (19 aJ) 1,000-watt (1.3 hp), quartz halogen lamp and the power source is mains electricity with a diesel generator as backup. Currently at the site are three one-story keeper's houses, a three-story signal station, and other buildings housing the port watch. The entire station is floodlit at night.

== Heritage listing ==
On 22 June 2004, the lighthouse and associated structures were registered on the Commonwealth Heritage List. On 21 October 1980, the lighthouse was listed on the (now defunct) Register of the National Estate.

== Gallery ==
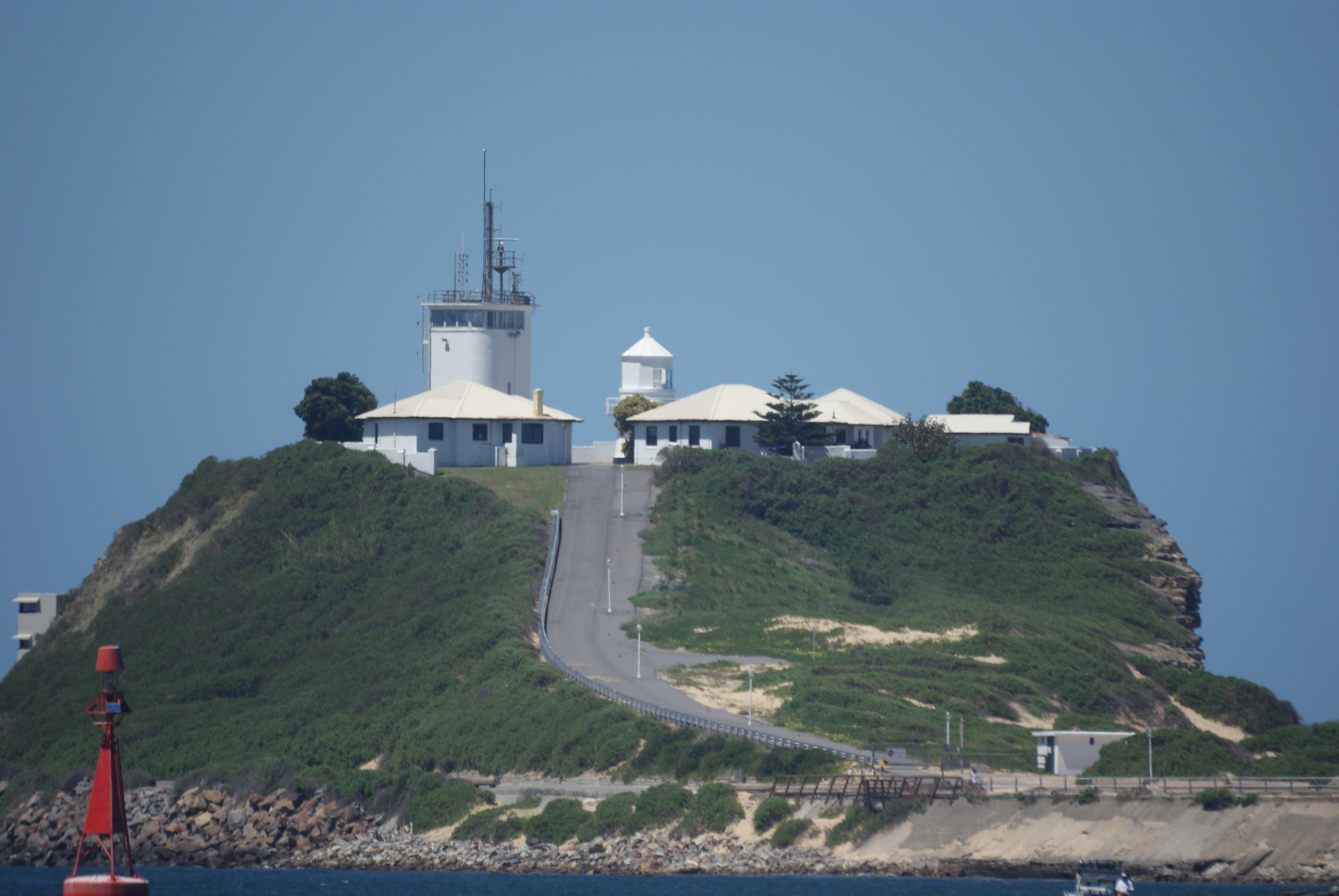
Nobbys Head, 2009

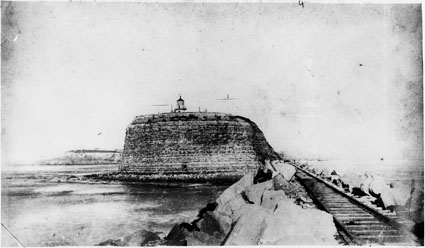
Nobbys Head in 1887

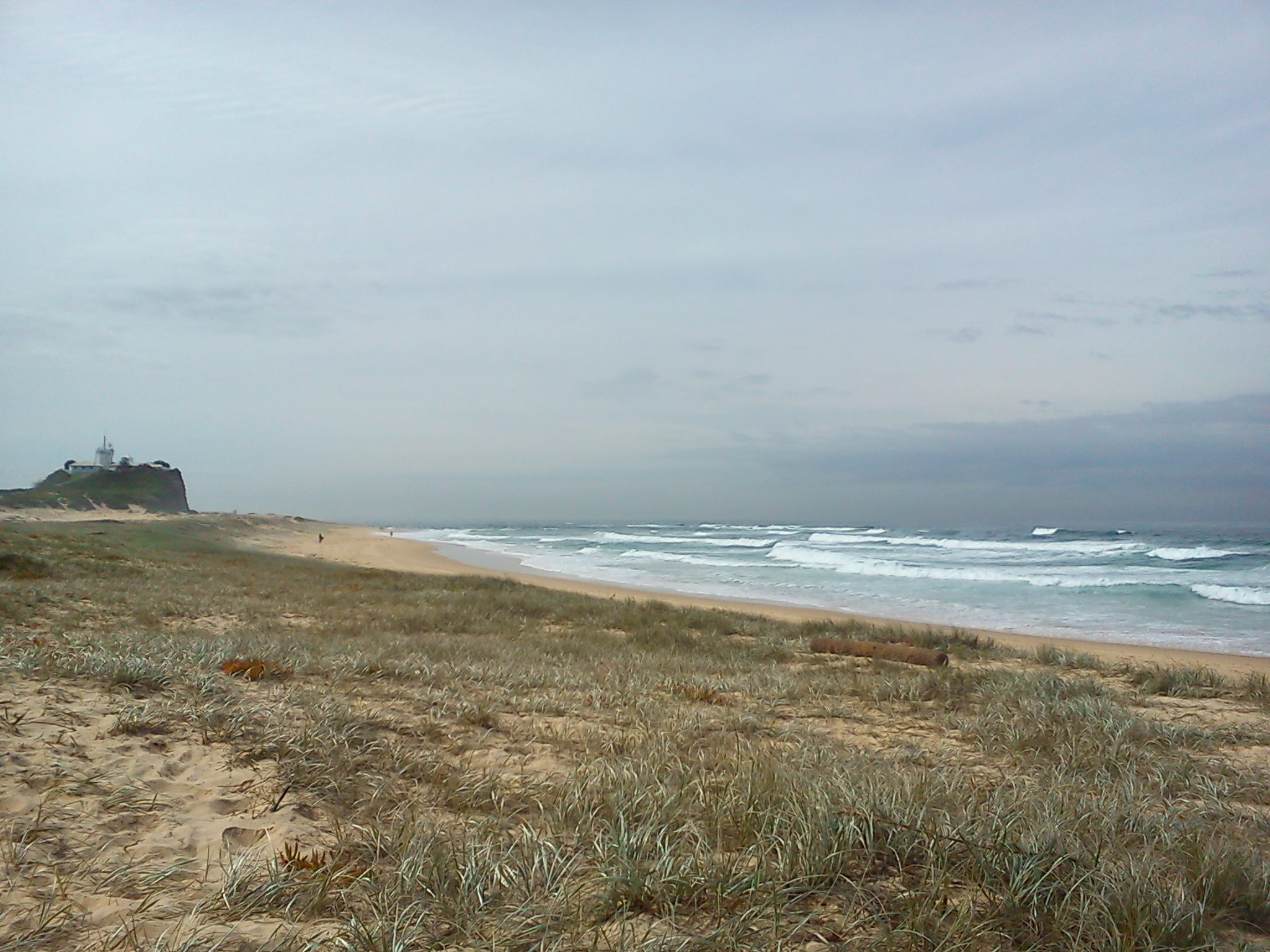
View of Nobbys Head from a distance

== See also ==
- List of lighthouses in Australia
