= Gytrash (horse) =

Australian Thoroughbred racehorse

- Sire: Lope de Vega
- Grandsire: Shamardal
- Dam: Miss Barley
- Damsire: Fastnet Rock
- Sex: Gelding
- Foaled: 28 August 2015
- Country: Australia
- Colour: Chestnut
- Breeder: Packaging Investments Aust Pty Ltd
- Owner: J Heaney, CA Reynolds, RM Warnock, JM Baker, PNU, AJ Charlton, LJ & L Clifford, SB Charlton, Dream To Win, Island Dreaming, RB Jones, VN Gordon, WA & G Blythman
- Trainer: Gordon Richards
- Record: 26: 10–6–7
- Earnings: A$ 3,738,775 + 750,000 bonus

Major wins
- Black Caviar Lightning (2020); R. N. Irwin Stakes (2020); Concorde Stakes (2020); Winners (Yes Yes Yes) Stakes (2020)

Awards
- Thoroughbred Racing South Australia Industry Awards, Champion RaceHorse of the Year (2019/2020).

Gytrash (foaled 28 August 2015) is a retired Australian Group 1 Thoroughbred racehorse, who was trained by Gordon Richards at Morphettville in South Australia. He is named after the legendary spirit of English folklore, the Gytrash that is said to take form of a horse, mule or dog.

== Background ==
Gytrash was bred by Packaging Investments Australia, Haltrow and Glastonbury Farms. He was first offered for sale as a weanling at the Great Southern Sale in 2016, where he was sold for $70,000.

"He was always a lovely type as a weanling, a big, strong chestnut just as he is now and for a Lope De Vega to make $70,000 as a weanling back then, he really did stand out in that sale," Glastonbury's Duncan Grimley said.

Gytrash was then offered at the 2017 Inglis Premier Yearling Sale where he was purchased by his trainer Gordon Richards for $40,000.

== Racing career ==
After a number of wins at Metropolitan level, he placed 3rd in the Group 2 Euclase Stakes, prior to competing at Group 1 level in The Goodwood. He then won back to back races down the Flemington Straight, the second of which earning him his first black-type race in the Listed Creswick Stakes, and a highly credible 2nd in the Group 3 The Heath 1100, earning high regard from jockey Craig Williams. This was followed by a short layoff to recover from a minor injury and missing the end of a spring 2019 campaign.

Gytrash resumed racing as a four-year-old after a 6-month spell in the Group 1 Black Caviar Lightning. Starting at odds of 20/1, he won by 1 length in a race which included champion sprinters Redzel and Nature Strip. Continuing his good Autumn form, he ran a credible 3rd in the Group 1 Newmarket Handicap carrying top weight, then delivered a 2nd place behind Loving Gaby in the Group 1 William Reid Stakes at Moonee Valley under lights with no spectators due to the start of the Coronavirus lockdowns in Australia.

Returning home to Adelaide for the Autumn Carnival, he defeated multiple Group 1 winning mare Sunlight in the Group 3 R. N. Irwin Stakes by over 3 lengths in the lead up to the Group 1 The Goodwood, in which he was narrowly beaten by Trekking and finished 2nd.

On 14 August 2020, Slot holders Inglis announced that Gytrash would be their contender in the 2020 edition of The Everest. Resuming training based at Warwick Farm in New South Wales, Gytrash then won first up, defeating Nature Strip in the Group 3 Concorde Stakes at Royal Randwick just outside of the track record. Remaining in Sydney, Gytrash tackled The Everest worth $AUD15 Million in the Inglis slot, on 17 October 2020, and finished in 3rd place behind Classique Legend and Bivouac, after a slow start and a strong finish. Gytrash then won over 1300m at Rosehill in the Winner's Stakes (the 2020 version named in honour of Yes Yes Yes for winning the previous years The Everest).

In the 2020 World's Best Racehorse Rankings, Gytrash was rated on 118, making him the equal 80th best racehorse in the world.

After a layoff due to an operation to remove a bone chip in a knee, Gytrash resumed racing in the 2021 The Goodwood for a fast finishing 3rd, and then travelled to Queensland to compete in the Kingsford-Smith Cup where he was badly impeded in the straight and finished 12th.

Spelling in Queensland then New South Wales, Gytrash was again selected by Inglis to compete in The Everest, and commenced his preparation in The Shorts finishing 3rd.

== Race record ==
2017–18 season as a two-year-old
Result	Date	Race	Venue	Group	Distance	Weight (kg)	Jockey	Winner/2nd
2-7	17 Feb 2018		Morphettville	2yo Set Weights	1100 m	53.5	A. Jordsjo	1-Double Denham 1:05.21
1-4	24 Feb 2018		Morphettville	2yo Handicap	1000 m	54.0	A. Jordsjo	2-Dancer's Kin 1:00.43
3-7	07 Apr 2018		Morphettville	2yo Handicap	1100 m	56.0	A. Jordsjo	1-Tequila Time 1:03.98
1-5	28 Jul 2018		Morphettville	2yo BM64	1050 m	57.0	A. Jordsjo	2-Carlaluisa 1:01.84

2018–19 season as a three-year-old
Result	Date	Race	Venue	Group	Distance	Weight (kg)	Jockey	Winner/2nd
2-7	08 Sep 2018		Morphettville	3yo BM64	1100 m	59.0	A. Jordsjo	1-Golden Halo 1:05.59
2-9	22 Sep 2018		Caulfield	3yo Set Weights & Penalties	1000 m	56.0	L. Nolen	1-Written By 0:57.59
3-9	20 Oct 2018		Morphettville	3yo Handicap	1200 m	57.0	A. Jordsjo	1-Schilldora 1:10.25
1-11	13 Apr 2019		Morphettville	BM82	1050 m	54.0	D. Tourneur	2-Carlingford 1:00.46
1-11	27 Apr 2019		Morphettville Parks	BM82	1000 m	56.0	J. Kah	2-Illumicon 0:57.47
3-13	4 May 2019	Euclase Stakes	Morphettville	Group 2	1200 m	57.5	D. Tourneur	1-Valour Road 1:10.04
10-16	18 May 2019	The Goodwood	Morphettville	Group 1	1200 m	53.0	D. Tourneur	1-Despatch 1:09.30
1-8	08 Jun 2019		Flemington	3yo Handicap	1000 m	53.0	F. Kersley	2 Halvoresen 0:58.07
1-11	22 Jun 2019	Creswick Stakes	Flemington	Listed	1200 m	59.0	C. Williams	2 Golden Halo 1:11.40

2019–20 season as a four year old
Result	Date	Race	Venue	Group	Distance	Weight (kg)	Jockey	Winner/2nd
2-8	31 Aug 2019	The Heath 1100	Caulfield	Group 3	1100 m	56.0	C. Williams	1-Crystal Dreamer 1:03.41
1-7	15 Feb 2020	Black Caviar Lightning	Flemington	Group 1	1000 m	58.5	M. Zahra	2-Redzel 57.53
3-11	7 Mar 2020	Newmarket Handicap	Flemington	Group 1	1200 m	57.0	B. Melham	1-Bivouac 1:09.21
2-11	20 Mar 2020	William Reid Stakes	Moonee Valley	Group 1	1200 m	58.5	M. Zahra	1-Loving Gaby 1:09.44
1-9	18 Apr 2020	R N Irwin Stakes	Morphettville	Group 3	1100 m	58.5	J. Holder	2-Sunlight 1:04.31
2-14	16 May 2020	The Goodwood	Morphettville	Group 1	1200 m	58.5	J. Holder	1-Trekking 1:10.38

2020–21 season as a five year old
Result	Date	Race	Venue	Group	Distance	Weight (kg)	Jockey	Winner/2nd
1-6	5 Sep 2020	Concorde Stakes	Randwick	Group 3	1000 m	60.0	J. Collett	2- Nature Strip 0:55.81
3-12	17 Oct 2020	The Everest	Randwick		1200 m	58.5	J. Collett	1- Classique Legend 1:08.27
1-9	31 Oct 2020	Yes Yes Yes Stakes	Rosehill		1300 m	58.5	J. Collett	2- Haut Brion Her 1:17.85
3-11	15 May 2021	The Goodwood	Morphettville	Group 1	1200 m	58.5	J. Collett	1- Savatoxl 1:10.19
12-15	29 May 2021	Kingsford-Smith Cup	Eagle Farm	Group 1	1300 m	59.0	J. Collett	1-Vega One 1:16.91

2020–21 season as a six year old
Result	Date	Race	Venue	Group	Distance	Weight (kg)	Jockey	Winner/2nd
3-8	18 Sep 2021	The Shorts	Randwick	Group 2	1100 m	58.0	J. Collett	1- Eduardo 1:03.54

== Pedigree ==
Pedigree of Gytrash (AUS) chestnut gelding, 2015
Sire Lope de Vega (IRE)	Shamardal (USA)	Giant's Causeway (USA)	Storm Cat (USA)
Sire Lope de Vega (IRE)	Shamardal (USA)	Giant's Causeway (USA)	Mariah's Storm (USA)
Sire Lope de Vega (IRE)	Shamardal (USA)	Helsinki (GB)	Machiavellian (USA)
Sire Lope de Vega (IRE)	Shamardal (USA)	Helsinki (GB)	Helen Street (GB)
Sire Lope de Vega (IRE)	Lady Vettori (GB)	Vettori (IRE)	Machiavellian (USA)
Sire Lope de Vega (IRE)	Lady Vettori (GB)	Vettori (IRE)	Air Distingue (USA)
Sire Lope de Vega (IRE)	Lady Vettori (GB)	Lady Golconda (FR)	Kendor (FR)
Sire Lope de Vega (IRE)	Lady Vettori (GB)	Lady Golconda (FR)	Lady Sharp (FR)
Dam Miss Barley (Aus)	Fastnet Rock (AUS)	Danehill (USA)	Danzig (USA)
Dam Miss Barley (Aus)	Fastnet Rock (AUS)	Danehill (USA)	Razyana (USA)
Dam Miss Barley (Aus)	Fastnet Rock (AUS)	Piccadilly Circus (AUS)	Royal Academy (USA)
Dam Miss Barley (Aus)	Fastnet Rock (AUS)	Piccadilly Circus (AUS)	Gatana (AUS)
Dam Miss Barley (Aus)	Wheatland Lady	Strawberry Road (AUS)	Whiskey Road (USA)
Dam Miss Barley (Aus)	Wheatland Lady	Strawberry Road (AUS)	Giftissa (NZ)
Dam Miss Barley (Aus)	Wheatland Lady	Pay the Piper (USA)	Bombay Duck (USA)
Dam Miss Barley (Aus)	Wheatland Lady	Pay the Piper (USA)	Riskay Reid (USA)
