= Golden Grove Stud =

Thoroughbred racing and breeding operation

- Type: Horse breeding Farm & Thoroughbred Racing Stable
- Industry: Thoroughbred Horse racing
- Headquarters: Denman, NSW, Australia
- Key people: Vivian Oldfield Sean Buckley Grant Mackay

Golden Grove Stud is a 259 acre property, established in 2014 by Sean Buckley and Vivian Oldfield in Denman in the Hunter Valley. It specialises in all aspects of equine care and selectively produces high achieving racehorses.

Golden Grove Stud is responsible for having produced Nature Strip (Nicconi), winner of the:

- Australian Racehorse of the Year (2019/20), (2021/22)
- Australian Sprinter of the Year (2019/20), (2020/21), (2021/22)
- McEwen Stakes (2018)
- Rubiton Stakes, The Galaxy and Moir Stakes (2019)
- Darley Sprint Classic (2019, 2021)
- Challenge Stakes (2020)
- TJ Smith Stakes (2020, 2021, 2022)
- Black Caviar Lightning, Concorde Stakes, The Everest (2021)
- King's Stand Stakes and The Shorts (2022).

It also produced the stakes performers Li’l Kontra (Krupt), Flying Award (Shamus Award) & The Barrister (Star Witness).

Other stakes winning graduates of note include Captain Duffy (Listed Geelong Classic, Geelong), Crown Witness (G3 Quezette Stakes, Caulfield) and Sovereign Award (G3 Caulfield, Flemington).
