= 2020 World's Best Racehorse Rankings =

The 2020 World's Best Racehorse Rankings, sponsored by Longines was the 2020 edition of the World's Best Racehorse Rankings. It was an assessment of Thoroughbred racehorses issued by the International Federation of Horseracing Authorities (IFHA) on 26 January 2021. It included horses aged three or older which competed in flat races during 2020, and was open to all horses irrespective of where they raced or where they were trained.

== Rankings for 2020 ==
- For a detailed guide to this table, see below.

Rank	Rating	Horse	Age	Sex	Trained	Surface	Cat.
1	130	Ghaiyyath (IRE)	5	H	GB	Turf	I, L
2	126	Authentic (USA)	3	C	USA	Dirt	I
3	125	Addeybb (IRE)	6	G	GB	Turf	M
3	125	Bivouac (AUS)	4	C	AUS	Turf	S
3	125	Classique Legend (AUS)	5	G	AUS	Turf	S
3	125	Palace Pier (GB)	3	C	GB	Turf	M
3	125	Persian King (IRE)	4	C	FR	Turf	M
3	125	Stradivarius (IRE)	6	H	GB	Turf	E
3	125	Tiz the Law (USA)	3	C	USA	Dirt	I
10	124	Almond Eye (JPN)	5	M	JPN	Turf	M, L
10	124	Contrail (JPN)	3	C	JPN	Turf	L
10	124	Golden Sixty (AUS)	5	G	HK	Turf	M
10	124	Mohaather (GB)	4	C	GB	Turf	M
10	124	Nature Strip (AUS)	6	G	AUS	Turf	S
15	123	Battaash (IRE)	6	G	GB	Turf	S
15	123	Fierement (JPN)	5	H	JPN	Turf	I, L
15	123	Glory Vase (JPN)	5	H	JPN	Turf	L
15	123	Improbable (USA)	4	C	USA	Dirt	M
15	123	Lord North (IRE)	4	G	GB	Turf	I
15	123	Sottsass (FR)	4	C	FR	Turf	L
21	122	Anthony Van Dyck (IRE)	4	C	IRE	Turf	L
21	122	Beauty Generation (NZ)	8	G	HK	Turf	M
21	122	Enable (GB)	6	M	GB	Turf	L
21	122	Gamine (USA)	3	F	USA	Dirt	M, S
21	122	In Swoop (IRE)	3	C	FR	Turf	L
21	122	Kameko (USA)	3	C	GB	Turf	M
21	122	Love (IRE)	3	F	IRE	Turf	L
21	122	Magical (IRE)	5	M	IRE	Turf	I
21	122	Maximum Security (USA)	4	C	USA	Dirt	I
21	122	Pinatubo (IRE)	3	C	GB	Turf	M
21	122	Swiss Skydiver (USA)	3	F	USA	Dirt	I
21	122	Tarnawa (IRE)	4	F	IRE	Turf	L
21	122	Tom's d'Etat (USA)	7	H	USA	Dirt	M
34	121	Chrono Genesis (JPN)	4	F	JPN	Turf	L
34	121	Do It Again (SAF)	6	G	SAF	Turf	L
34	121	Gran Alegria (JPN)	4	F	JPN	Turf	M
34	121	Mogul (GB)	3	C	IRE	Turf	L
34	121	Sir Dragonet (IRE)	4	C	AUS	Turf	I
34	121	Skalleti (FR)	5	G	FR	Turf	I
40	120	Armory (IRE)	3	C	IRE	Turf	I
40	120	Channel Maker (CAN)	6	G	USA	Turf	L
40	120	Circus Maximus (IRE)	4	C	IRE	Turf	M
40	120	Dream of Dreams (IRE)	6	G	GB	Turf	S, M
40	120	Exultant (IRE)	6	G	HK	Turf	M
40	120	Global Campaign (USA)	4	C	USA	Dirt	I
40	120	Hawwaam (SAF)	5	H	SAF	Turf	I
40	120	Hot King Prawn (AUS)	6	G	HK	Turf	S
40	120	Japan (GB)	4	C	IRE	Turf	I
40	120	Mishriff (IRE)	3	C	GB	Turf	I
40	120	Mo Forza (USA)	4	C	USA	Turf	M
40	120	Monomoy Girl (USA)	5	M	USA	Dirt	M
40	120	Order of Australia (IRE)	3	C	IRE	Turf	M
40	120	Oxted (GB)	4	G	GB	Turf	S
40	120	Saturnalia (JPN)	4	C	JPN	Turf	I
40	120	Serpentine (IRE)	3	C	IRE	Turf	L
40	120	Space Blues (IRE)	4	C	GB	Turf	S
57	119	Alpine Star (IRE)	3	F	IRE	Turf	M
57	119	Art Collector (USA)	3	C	USA	Dirt	M
57	119	Beat The Clock (AUS)	7	G	HK	Turf	S
57	119	Charlatan (USA)	3	C	USA	Dirt	S
57	119	Chrysoberyl (JPN)	4	C	JPN	Dirt	I
57	119	Curren Bouquetd'Or (JPN)	4	F	JPN	Turf	L
57	119	Danon Premium (JPN)	5	H	JPN	Turf	I
57	119	Daring Tact (JPN)	3	F	JPN	Turf	L
57	119	Gold Trip (FR)	3	C	FR	Turf	L
57	119	Indy Champ (JPN)	5	H	JPN	Turf	M
57	119	Knicks Go (USA)	4	C	USA	Dirt	M
57	119	One World (SAF)	5	H	SAF	Turf	M
57	119	Pyledriver (GB)	3	C	GB	Turf	L
57	119	Rainbow Bridge (SAF)	6	G	SAF	Turf	M, L
57	119	Salacia (JPN)	5	M	JPN	Turf	L
57	119	Salios (JPN)	3	C	JPN	Turf	I, M
57	119	Santa Ana Lane (AUS)	8	G	AUS	Turf	S
57	119	Shedaresthedevil (USA)	3	F	USA	Dirt	M
57	119	Siskin (USA)	3	C	IRE	Turf	M
57	119	The Revenant (GB)	5	G	FR	Turf	M
57	119	Vardy (SAF)	5	G	SAF	Turf	M
57	119	Vekoma (USA)	4	C	USA	Dirt	S, M
57	119	Win Bright (JPN)	6	H	JPN	Turf	I
80	118	Admire Mars (JPN)	4	C	JPN	Turf	M
80	118	Benbatl (GB)	6	H	GB	Turf, Dirt	M
80	118	Call The Wind (GB)	6	G	FR	Turf	E
80	118	Danon Kingly (JPN)	4	C	JPN	Turf	M, I
80	118	Gytrash (AUS)	5	G	AUS	Turf	S
80	118	Hello Youmzain (FR)	4	C	GB	Turf	S
80	118	Hey Doc (AUS)	7	G	AUS	Turf	S
80	118	Midnight Bisou (USA)	5	M	USA	Dirt	M
80	118	Mr Stunning (AUS)	8	G	HK	Turf	S
80	118	Mucho Gusto (USA)	4	C	USA	Dirt	M
80	118	Nadal (USA)	3	C	USA	Dirt	M
80	118	Pierata (AUS)	6	H	AUS	Turf	S, M
80	118	Redzel (AUS)	8	G	AUS	Turf	S
80	118	Regal Power (AUS)	5	G	AUS	Turf	M
80	118	Roseman (IRE)	4	C	GB	Turf	M
80	118	Rothfire (AUS)	3	C	AUS	Turf	S
80	118	Rushing Fall (USA)	5	M	USA	Turf	M
80	118	Russian Camelot (IRE)	3	C	AUS	Turf	M
80	118	Southern Legend (AUS)	8	G	HK	Turf	M
80	118	Te Akau Shark (NZ)	6	G	NZ	Turf	M
80	118	Thanks Forever (AUS)	5	G	HK	Turf	S
80	118	Trekking (AUS)	6	G	AUS	Turf	S
80	118	Trueshan (FR)	4	G	GB	Turf	E
80	118	Waikuku (IRE)	5	G	HK	Turf	M
80	118	Wichita (IRE)	3	C	IRE	Turf	M
80	118	World Premiere (JPN)	4	C	JPN	Turf	L
80	118	Zulu Alpha (USA)	7	G	USA	Turf	L

== Guide ==
A complete guide to the main table above.

Rank
A horse's position in the list, with the most highly rated at number 1. Each horse is ranked once according to its highest rating. Any lesser ratings for the same horse are not ranked.

Rating
A rating represents a weight value in pounds, with higher values given to horses which showed greater ability. It is judged that these weights would equalise the abilities of the horses if carried in a theoretical handicap race. The minimum rating required for inclusion is 115.

Horse
Each horse's name is followed by a suffix (from the IFHA's International Code of Suffixes) which indicates the country foaled.

Age
The age of the horse at the time it achieved its rating. The racing ages of all horses foaled in a particular part of the world increase simultaneously, regardless of the actual date of foaling.
Dates of age increase by location foaled
Northern Hemisphere	1 January
South America	1 July
Australia, New Zealand and South Africa	1 August

Sex
C	Colt	Ungelded male horse up to four-years-old
F	Filly	Female horse up to four-years-old
H	Horse	Ungelded male horse over four-years-old
M	Mare	Female horse over four-years-old
G	Gelding	Gelded male horse of any age

Trained
The country where the horse was trained at the time of the rating, abbreviated using the International Code of Suffixes.

Position
The horse's finishing position in the race shown. The actual finishing order can sometimes be amended following an inquiry or a disqualification.
=	Dead-heat
↑	Promoted from original finishing position
↓	Relegated from original finishing position

Race
The race (or one of the races) for which the horse achieved its rating. A defeated horse can be rated above its higher-placed opponents if it carried more weight.

Surface
The surface of the track on which the race was run, eg. turf or dirt. Synthetic surfaces are described as "artificial".

Distance
The distance of the race in metres. In some countries (eg. Canada, Great Britain, Ireland and the United States), the length of a race is usually expressed in miles and furlongs. These units have been converted to metres to allow for universal comparison.
Common conversions
5 furlongs	= 1,006 m	1 mile and 1½ furlongs	= 1,911 m
6 furlongs	= 1,207 m	1 mile and 2 furlongs	= 2,012 m
6½ furlongs	= 1,308 m	1 mile and 2½ furlongs	= 2,112 m
7 furlongs	= 1,408 m	1 mile and 3 furlongs	= 2,213 m
7½ furlongs	= 1,509 m	1 mile and 4 furlongs	= 2,414 m
1 mile	= 1,609 m	1 mile and 6 furlongs	= 2,816 m
1 mile and ½ furlong	= 1,710 m	2 miles	= 3,219 m
1 mile and 1 furlong	= 1,811 m	2 miles and 4 furlongs	= 4,023 m

Category
		Metres	Furlongs
S	Sprint	1,000–1,300; 1,000–1,599 (CAN / USA)	5–6.5; 5–7.99 (CAN / USA)
M	Mile	1,301–1,899; 1,600–1,899 (CAN / USA)	6.51–9.49; 8–9.49 (CAN / USA)
I	Intermediate	1,900–2,100	9.5–10.5
L	Long	2,101–2,700	10.51–13.5
E	Extended	2,701+	13.51+

International Code of Suffixes
The following countries have been represented in the WTR as foaling or training locations since the first edition in 2004.
ARG	Argentina	ITY	Italy
AUS	Australia	JPN	Japan
BRZ	Brazil	KSA	Saudi Arabia
CAN	Canada	NZ	New Zealand
CHI	Chile	SAF	South Africa
CZE	Czech Republic	SIN	Singapore
FR	France	SPA	Spain
GB	Great Britain	TUR	Turkey
GER	Germany	UAE	United Arab Emirates
HK	Hong Kong	USA	United States
HUN	Hungary	VEN	Venezuela
IRE	Ireland	ZIM	Zimbabwe

Shading
The shaded areas represent lesser ratings recorded by horses which were more highly rated in a different category. The IFHA publishes this information when the lower rating is the overall top performance in a particular category.
