= Home Affairs (horse) =

Australian thoroughbred racehorse

- Racing silks of Home Affairs
- Sire: I Am Invincible
- Grandsire: Invincible Spirit
- Dam: Miss Interiors
- Damsire: Flying Spur
- Sex: Stallion
- Foaled: 16 August 2018
- Country: Australia
- Colour: Bay
- Breeder: Torryburn Stud
- Owner: Coolmore et al.
- Trainer: Chris Waller
- Jockey: James McDonald
- Record: 10: 4-1-1
- Earnings: AU$2,295,700

Major wins
- Silver Slipper Stakes (2021); Coolmore Stud Stakes (2021); Black Caviar Lightning (2022)

Home Affairs (foaled 16 August 2018) is a retired Australian thoroughbred racehorse that has won multiple Group One races. He started his breeding career in 2022.

== Background ==
Home Affairs was born and bred in Torryburn, New South Wales at the boutique Torryburn Stud. He is the second foal from the broodmare, Miss Interiors, whose first foal, Aysar, ran second in the 2020 Caulfield Guineas behind Ole Kirk.

Home Affairs was purchased as a yearling for A$875,000 by Coolmore, who also syndicated the horse to many international and domestic owners.

== Racing career ==
=== 2020/21: two-year-old season ===
Home Affairs made his debut on the 30 January 2021 at Rosehill in the Canonbury Stakes over 1,100 metres. Starting the $2.50 favourite, he travelled strongly to hit the front 200m out, but was beaten a short margin late by the Godolphin runner, Zethus.

Three weeks later Home Affairs contested the Silver Slipper Stakes at Rosehill. He won the race by a margin of a short neck. Trainer Chris Waller said after the win, "We've always known he was a talented horse, looking at him, he certainly looks the part, he's got a great attitude and is doing everything right."

Home Affairs next contested the Todman Stakes at Randwick. Starting the race at odds of 20/1, he was beaten a half-length into third place by Anamoe.

On the 27 March, Home Affairs raced in the Golden Slipper at Rosehill. At odds of 11/1 he finished in 8th placing beaten 6 lengths. Jockey James McDonald said after the race, "He’s a beautiful colt. Will be a lovely 3yo."

=== 2021/22: three-year-old season ===
After a six-month break, Home Affairs won first-up in the Heritage Stakes at Rosehill. He next took part in The Everest when finishing 9th behind Nature Strip.

Two weeks later he took part in the Coolmore Stud Stakes at Flemington. This would prove to be the horses first Group One victory, winning by a dominant margin of 3 lengths. Jockey McDonald said after the race, "He was electric today, nothing could keep up with him."

Four months later on the 19 February 2022, Home Affairs started in the Black Caviar Lightning at Flemington. The favourite in the race Nature Strip suffered severe interference at the start of the race, which allowed Home Affairs to win by a short-half-head from Nature Strip.

On the 12 March 2022, Home Affairs contested the Newmarket Handicap at Flemington over 1,200 metres. The colt finished in a disappointing 9th place. Jockey James McDonald said after the race of the performance, "He ran super under the big weight. He tried his heart out."

Home Affairs then started favourite in the Platinum Jubilee Stakes at Royal Ascot. He finished in 20th position and was retired from racing to start his breeding career.

== Stud Career ==
Home Affairs commenced stud duties in 2022 at Coolmore Stud in Australia. His initial service fee was set at $110,000.

=== Notable progeny ===
c = colt, f = filly, g = gelding

Foaled	Name	Sex	Major wins
2023	Guest House	c	Golden Slipper

== Pedigree ==
Pedigree of Home Affairs (AUS) 2018
Sire I Am Invincible (AUS) 2004	Invincible Spirit (IRE); 1997	Green Desert	Danzig
Sire I Am Invincible (AUS) 2004	Invincible Spirit (IRE); 1997	Green Desert	Foreign Courier
Sire I Am Invincible (AUS) 2004	Invincible Spirit (IRE); 1997	Rafha	Kris
Sire I Am Invincible (AUS) 2004	Invincible Spirit (IRE); 1997	Rafha	Eljazzi
Sire I Am Invincible (AUS) 2004	Cannarelle (AUS); 1998	Canny Lad	Bletchingly
Sire I Am Invincible (AUS) 2004	Cannarelle (AUS); 1998	Canny Lad	Jesmond Lass
Sire I Am Invincible (AUS) 2004	Cannarelle (AUS); 1998	Countess Pedrille	Zoffany
Sire I Am Invincible (AUS) 2004	Cannarelle (AUS); 1998	Countess Pedrille	Sister Pedrille
Dam Miss Interiors (AUS) 2011	Flying Spur (AUS); 1992	Danehill	Danzig
Dam Miss Interiors (AUS) 2011	Flying Spur (AUS); 1992	Danehill	Razyana
Dam Miss Interiors (AUS) 2011	Flying Spur (AUS); 1992	Rolls	Mr. Prospector
Dam Miss Interiors (AUS) 2011	Flying Spur (AUS); 1992	Rolls	Grand Luxe
Dam Miss Interiors (AUS) 2011	Ballet D'Amour (USA); 2005	Stravinsky	Nureyev
Dam Miss Interiors (AUS) 2011	Ballet D'Amour (USA); 2005	Stravinsky	Fire The Groom
Dam Miss Interiors (AUS) 2011	Ballet D'Amour (USA); 2005	Exigent	Miswaki
Dam Miss Interiors (AUS) 2011	Ballet D'Amour (USA); 2005	Exigent	L'Extravagante
