= Concorde Stakes =

Concorde Stakes may refer to:

- Concorde Stakes (Australia), a horse race held at Randwick Racecourse in Australia.
- Concorde Stakes (Ireland), a horse race held at Tipperary Racecourse in Ireland.
