= Bella Nipotina =

Australian Thoroughbred racehorse

- Sire: Pride of Dubai (AUS)
- Dam: Bella Orfana (AUS)
- Damsire: Stratum (AUS)
- Sex: Mare
- Foaled: 2017
- Country: Australia
- Colour: Bay
- Owner: Rosemont Stud
- Trainer: Ciaron Maher
- Jockey: Craig Williams
- Record: 57: 11-13-13
- Earnings: $22,750,000

Major wins
- Manikato Stakes; Russell Balding Stakes; Doomben 10,000; Tattersall's Tiara; The Everest

Bella Nipotina (foaled 2017) is a retired four-time Group 1 winning Australian Thoroughbred racehorse. As of her retirement, she had earned the second-highest prize money amount of any Australian racehorse, only behind Winx.

== Background ==
Bella Nipotina was sired by Pride of Dubai, a Group 1-winning son of Street Cry. She was an $80,000 purchase from Rosemont Stud's draft in 2019 and was trained by Ciaron Maher.

== Racing career ==
After a relatively uneventful early career, Bella reached her peak racing form in her later years, with her first Group 1 win being in the Manikato Stakes in 2022. Her biggest victory came in the 2024 running of The Everest, Australia's richest race, ridden by Craig Williams. She was the first female horse to have won the race.

Bella was retired in 2025, her final race being in the Group 1 Champions Sprint, finishing third. Following her retirement, she was sold for $4.2 million at the Inglis Chairman’s Sale on 8 May, 2025. Shortly after the sale, it was announced that she would be bred with the two-time Group 1-winning sire Zoustar.
