= Giga Kick =

Australian-bred Thoroughbred racehorse

- Sire: Scissor Kick
- Grandsire: Redoute's Choice
- Dam: Rekindled Applause
- Damsire: Royal Applause
- Sex: Gelding
- Foaled: 19 October 2019 (age 6)
- Country: Australia
- Colour: Chestnut
- Owner: Pinecliff Racing
- Trainer: Clayton Douglas
- Jockey: Craig Williams, James McDonald
- Record: 14: 7-2-2
- Earnings: A$12,589,700

Major wins
- The Everest (2022); Danehill Stakes (2022); Vain Stakes (2022); All Aged Stakes (2023); Doomben 10,000 (2023); Schillaci Stakes (2025); Champions Sprint (VRC) (2025)

Awards
- Australian Champion Sprinter (2023); Australian Champion Three Year Old Colt/Gelding (2023)
- Last updated on 26 Jan 2026

Giga Kick is a Thoroughbred racehorse trained and bred in Australia. He has won The Everest, three other group one races and over twelve million dollars over his career.

== Career ==
Giga Kick made his debut in an 1100m maiden race at Sale on 13 February, 2022. Leading all the way, it was an "impressive" win. He was then spelled for 18 weeks.

After two trials, Giga Kick returned at Flemington on 16 July. Jockey Matthew Cartwright, "capitalised on Giga Kick’s natural speed to have the chestnut near the lead early before the promising sprinter dashed clear to score impressively". Trainer Clayton Douglas said, "The idea to have him in early was that he's only had the one run and he's going to be meeting some pretty experienced horses through the spring. So, this was always going to be more of an educational run."

After a further trial, Giga Kick won the Group 3 Vain Stakes, Douglas's first stakes victory. Five lengths behind at the turn, he won by a long head. Douglas said after the race, "He is still an immature type. He hasn't come in the coat completely, so there is nice improvement."

On 1 October 2022, Giga Kick won the Danehill Stakes. Jumping as odd-on favourite, jockey Craig Williams said he "looked to be under pressure from Buenos Noches from the 300m mark all the way until the finish line" but hung on "to win by a nostril". Williams said, "there's a lot that we and I will learn out of today with this horse, the way that he is developing and he is really, apart from being undefeated and winning today and off to the Coolmore, he is a really exciting horse."

Two weeks later, Giga Kick won The Everest, Australia's richest horse race. One of the last horses to be nominated for the race, Giga Kick jumped at $21, with Nature Strip, the previous year's winner, the odds-on favourite. Tenth with 400 metres to go, he "produced an explosive finish to reel in his older rivals".

== Pedigree ==
Pedigree of Giga Kick (AUS) 2019
Sire Scissor Kick (AUS) 2011	Redoute's Choice (AUS); 1996	Danehill	Danzig
Sire Scissor Kick (AUS) 2011	Redoute's Choice (AUS); 1996	Danehill	Razyana
Sire Scissor Kick (AUS) 2011	Redoute's Choice (AUS); 1996	Shanthas Choice	Canny Lad
Sire Scissor Kick (AUS) 2011	Redoute's Choice (AUS); 1996	Shanthas Choice	Dancing Show
Sire Scissor Kick (AUS) 2011	Back Pass (USA); 1998	Quest For Fame	Rainbow Quest
Sire Scissor Kick (AUS) 2011	Back Pass (USA); 1998	Quest For Fame	Aryenne
Sire Scissor Kick (AUS) 2011	Back Pass (USA); 1998	Skiable	Niniski
Sire Scissor Kick (AUS) 2011	Back Pass (USA); 1998	Skiable	Kerali
Dam Rekindled Applause (GB) 2001	Royal Applause (GB); 1993	Waajib	Try My Best
Dam Rekindled Applause (GB) 2001	Royal Applause (GB); 1993	Waajib	Coryana
Dam Rekindled Applause (GB) 2001	Royal Applause (GB); 1993	Flying Melody	Auction Ring
Dam Rekindled Applause (GB) 2001	Royal Applause (GB); 1993	Flying Melody	Whispering Star
Dam Rekindled Applause (GB) 2001	Rekindled Affair (IRE); 1995	Rainbow Quest	Blushing Groom
Dam Rekindled Applause (GB) 2001	Rekindled Affair (IRE); 1995	Rainbow Quest	I Will Follow
Dam Rekindled Applause (GB) 2001	Rekindled Affair (IRE); 1995	Seasonal Pickup	The Minstrel
Dam Rekindled Applause (GB) 2001	Rekindled Affair (IRE); 1995	Seasonal Pickup	Bubinka
