= Sunlight (horse) =

Australian thoroughbred racehorse

- Sire: Zoustar
- Grandsire: Northern Meteor
- Dam: Solar Charged
- Damsire: Charge Forward
- Sex: Mare
- Foaled: 9 October 2015
- Country: Australia
- Colour: Bay
- Breeder: Widden Stud Australia
- Owner: RC Parker, L Fung, IE Mitchell, KL Thompson, RJ SR & JR Fletcher, G1G Racing & Breeding, Qatar Bloodstock Ltd
- Trainer: Tony & Calvin McEvoy
- Record: 24: 11–3–5
- Earnings: A$ 6,575,950

Major wins
- Magic Millions 2yo Classic (2018); Silver Slipper Stakes (2018); Magic Night Stakes (2018); Quezette Stakes (2018); Thoroughbred Club Stakes (2018); Coolmore Stud Stakes (2018); Newmarket Handicap (2019); William Reid Stakes (2019); Gilgai Stakes (2019)

Awards
- Australian Champion Three Year Old Filly (2018-19)

Sunlight (foaled 9 October 2015) is a three-time Group 1 winning Australian bred thoroughbred racehorse.

== Background ==
Sunlight was purchased for $300,000 at the 2017 Magic Millions sale. She is by multiple Group I winner Zoustar, out of the former smart mare Solar Charged, a two-time Group III winner of the Kindergarten Stakes and Thoroughbred Club Stakes.

== Racing career ==
Sunlight made her debut at Flemington Racecourse in October 2017 where she finished third in the Maribyrnong Trial Stakes. Two months later she won her first race at the Gold Coast when leading all the way to win by 4.75 lengths. She repeated this effort two weeks later at the same course when winning by 4.5 lengths. These races were used as a lead up to the Magic Millions 2YO Classic run on the same course in January 2018. In this race, Sunlight started as the 3/1 favourite, and despite suffering severe interference during the race, she won by 2 lengths, earning her owners first prizemoney of $1.525 million.

After a six-week break, Sunlight narrowly won the Silver Slipper Stakes when resuming at Rosehill Gardens Racecourse. At her next start she was successful at the same course when winning the Magic Night Stakes. At her next run she started at the odds of 4/1 when running third in the Golden Slipper Stakes, beaten 1.5 lengths.

Sunlight had her final race as a two-year-old in July 2018 at Morphettville Racecourse. In what was billed as a match race of Sunlight vs Nature Strip, the older horse Nature Strip proved far too good, defeating Sunlight by 6 lengths.

Sunlight resumed racing as a three-year-old with successive Group 3 victories at Caulfield Racecourse in the Quezette Stakes and Thoroughbred Club Stakes. A month later she won her first Group 1 race the Coolmore Stud Stakes. In a field of 10, she was the only filly in the race against 9 other colt's. Sunlight won a further two Group 1 races as a three-year-old, the Newmarket Handicap and the William Reid Stakes.

As a four-year-old Sunlight won the Gilgai Stakes, before finishing unplaced in The Everest. She then finished second in the inaugural running of the Golden Eagle, collecting prizemoney of $1.5 million for doing so.

Sunlight was retired in 2020 after disappointing displays in the G1 The Goodwood and Robert Sangster Stakes.

== Stud career ==
In July 2020, Sunlight was purchased by Coolmore Stud at the Magic Millions National Broodmare sale for A$4,200,000.

Her first mating will be with American Triple Crown winner Justify.

Sunlight gave birth to that foal, a colt in 2021

== Pedigree ==
Pedigree of Sunlight (AUS) 2015
Sire Zoustar (AUS) 2010	Northern Meteor (AUS); 2005	Encosta De Lago	Fairy King
Sire Zoustar (AUS) 2010	Northern Meteor (AUS); 2005	Encosta De Lago	Shoal Creek
Sire Zoustar (AUS) 2010	Northern Meteor (AUS); 2005	Explosive	Fappiano
Sire Zoustar (AUS) 2010	Northern Meteor (AUS); 2005	Explosive	Scuff
Sire Zoustar (AUS) 2010	Zouzou (AUS); 2001	Redoute's Choice	Danehill
Sire Zoustar (AUS) 2010	Zouzou (AUS); 2001	Redoute's Choice	Shantha's Choice
Sire Zoustar (AUS) 2010	Zouzou (AUS); 2001	Meteor Mist	Star Shower
Sire Zoustar (AUS) 2010	Zouzou (AUS); 2001	Meteor Mist	Sunbuster
Dam Solar Charged (AUS) 2007	Charge Forward (AUS); 2001	Red Ransom	Roberto
Dam Solar Charged (AUS) 2007	Charge Forward (AUS); 2001	Red Ransom	Arabia
Dam Solar Charged (AUS) 2007	Charge Forward (AUS); 2001	Sydney's Dream	Bletchingly
Dam Solar Charged (AUS) 2007	Charge Forward (AUS); 2001	Sydney's Dream	Dream Appeal
Dam Solar Charged (AUS) 2007	Soul Singer (AUS); 1998	Danehill	Danzig
Dam Solar Charged (AUS) 2007	Soul Singer (AUS); 1998	Danehill	Razyana
Dam Solar Charged (AUS) 2007	Soul Singer (AUS); 1998	Aretha	Sir Dapper
Dam Solar Charged (AUS) 2007	Soul Singer (AUS); 1998	Aretha	Soul Power
