= Bivouac (horse) =

Australian Thoroughbred racehorse

- Racing silks of Godolphin
- Sire: Exceed And Excel
- Grandsire: Danehill
- Dam: Dazzler
- Damsire: More Than Ready
- Sex: Colt
- Foaled: 4 November 2016
- Country: Australia
- Colour: Bay
- Breeder: Godolphin
- Owner: Godolphin
- Trainer: James Cummings
- Record: 22: 7–4–3
- Earnings: A$ 5,668,860

Major wins
- Kindergarten Stakes (2019); Vain Stakes (2019); The Run to the Rose (2019); Golden Rose Stakes (2019); Newmarket Handicap (2020); VRC Sprint Classic (2020)

Bivouac (foaled 4 November 2016) is a multiple Group 1 winning Australian thoroughbred racehorse.

== Background ==
Bivouac is a home-bred stallion by Godolphin. He is out of the Australian sire Exceed And Excel and is a three-quarter brother to the 4-time Group 1 winner Guelph. Bivouac is out of the mare, Dazzler, who won her first two starts at Geelong and Flemington in an 11-start career.

== Racing career ==
=== 2018/19: two-year-old season ===
Bivouac began his racing career with a second placing at Randwick, followed by a third placing three months later at the same track. His third start in a race was at Warwick Farm Racecourse in the Listed Lonhro Plate. Starting at odds of $6.50 he won by a length under jockey Blake Shinn. Immediately after the race assistant trainer Darren Beadman said, "Being on his home track he had a big advantage. He is a real little professional, he just gets the job done".

After finishing unplaced at his next start in the Todman Stakes, Bivouac was listed as the first emergency for the Golden Slipper Stakes, however he failed to gain a start. Two weeks later he started in the Kindergarten Stakes at Group 3 level at the odds of $6. He won the race by 2 lengths with Blake Shinn in the saddle again. After the race Shinn stated, "He's a very exciting horse, he won dominantly today as he did when I won on him at Warwick Farm."

=== 2019/20: three-year-old season ===
Bivouac resumed racing as a three-year-old in the Vain Stakes at Caulfield Racecourse. Starting as a $3 favourite he won the race by over 4 lengths. As a result of his dominant win in the Vain Stakes, his next start he was installed the $1.35 favourite in the San Domenico Stakes but finished in second place.

Bivouac's next start he was successful in The Run to the Rose Stakes. Two weeks later he contested his first Group 1 race, the Golden Rose Stakes at Rosehill Racecourse. He won under jockey Hugh Bowman as the $2.50 favourite. His trainer James Cummings described watching Bivouac win the Golden Rose as ‘poetry in motion’.

Bivouac started $1.80 favourite at his next start in the Manikato Stakes at Moonee Valley Racecourse. Starting from barrier 1, the horse drifted back through the field and was blocked for runs throughout the race, eventually finishing in 6th position. Jockey Kerrin McEvoy said after the race, "He was a little bit unlucky. He was three-back the fence and I never really got to let him off the bridle at all". Some however were critical of McEvoy's ride. Columnist Richard Callander believed that the Manikato Stakes was a major race that got away from McEvoy and made him pose the question "Was Kerrin McEvoy asleep at the wheel on Bivouac?" Bivouac contested the Coolmore Stud Stakes a week later and was narrowly beaten into second place for jockey Hugh Bowman.

Bivouac was then sent for a three-month spell and returned to racing in the 2020 Oakleigh Plate. After settling in the back half of the field he flashed home late to finish 6th, beaten 2.5 lengths. Next start he contested the Group 1 Newmarket Handicap at Flemington Racecourse. Ridden by jockey Glen Boss, he started at odds of $5.50 and won the race comfortably by 2.5 lengths. Boss said, "It’s amazing when you get on these colts, just going to the barriers, I knew I was a winner, you can just tell when they’re on. He went down to the barriers like he really meant business, every stride he took he had his game face on.”

On 20 May 2020 Bivouac finished third in the William Reid Stakes, before unplaced runs in the TJ Smith Stakes and All Aged Stakes.

=== 2020/21: four-year-old season ===
After running placings in The Shorts and The Everest, on both occasions beaten by Classique Legend, Bivouac started at odds of $3.20 in the Group 1 VRC Sprint Classic. Ridden by Glen Boss he won by over 3 lengths, beating the reigning Australian Horse of the Year, Nature Strip.

Bivouac would not start for another 3 months when resuming on the 13 February 2021 in the Black Caviar Lightning at Flemington over 1,000 metres. Starting the $2.15 favourite he failed to threaten in the finish, eventually being beaten into 5th place by the winner Nature Strip. After two unplaced starts in the Canterbury Stakes and TJ Smith Stakes the horse was retired from racing.

== Stud career ==
Bivouac was retired to stand at Darley Australia for the 2021 season. He was one of four new stallions to stand that season for Godolphin including the European trio of Ghaiyyath, Pinatubo and Earthlight.

=== Notable progeny ===
c = colt, f = filly, g = gelding

Foaled	Name	Sex	Major wins
2022	Beiwacht	c	Golden Rose Stakes, All Aged Stakes
2022	Fireball Miss	f	Doomben Roses, Queensland Oaks

== Pedigree ==
Pedigree of Bivouac (AUS) 2016
Sire Exceed And Excel (AUS) 2000	Danehill (USA); 1986	Danzig	Northern Dancer
Sire Exceed And Excel (AUS) 2000	Danehill (USA); 1986	Danzig	Pas De Nom
Sire Exceed And Excel (AUS) 2000	Danehill (USA); 1986	Razyana	His Majesty
Sire Exceed And Excel (AUS) 2000	Danehill (USA); 1986	Razyana	Spring Adieu
Sire Exceed And Excel (AUS) 2000	Patrona (USA); 1994	Lomond	Northern Dancer
Sire Exceed And Excel (AUS) 2000	Patrona (USA); 1994	Lomond	My Charmer
Sire Exceed And Excel (AUS) 2000	Patrona (USA); 1994	Gladiolus	Watch Your Step
Sire Exceed And Excel (AUS) 2000	Patrona (USA); 1994	Gladiolus	Back Britches
Dam Dazzler (AUS) 2009	More Than Ready (USA); 1997	Southern Halo	Halo
Dam Dazzler (AUS) 2009	More Than Ready (USA); 1997	Southern Halo	Northern Sea
Dam Dazzler (AUS) 2009	More Than Ready (USA); 1997	Woodmans Girl	Woodman
Dam Dazzler (AUS) 2009	More Than Ready (USA); 1997	Woodmans Girl	Becky Be Good
Dam Dazzler (AUS) 2009	Camarilla (AUS); 2004	Elusive Quality	Gone West
Dam Dazzler (AUS) 2009	Camarilla (AUS); 2004	Elusive Quality	Touch Of Greatness
Dam Dazzler (AUS) 2009	Camarilla (AUS); 2004	Camarena	Danehill
Dam Dazzler (AUS) 2009	Camarilla (AUS); 2004	Camarena	Canny Miss
