= Pierata =

Australian Thoroughbred racehorse

- Sire: Pierro
- Grandsire: Lonhro
- Dam: November Flight
- Damsire: Flying Spur
- Sex: Stallion
- Foaled: 2014
- Country: Australia
- Colour: Brown
- Breeder: Hobartville Stud
- Owner: GD Hickman, RW Wilson, WS, GA & CE Clegg, AA Gianesi, A Merritt, K Ayton, BR Turton, MT Mathews, CJ Testa, V Sikais, Steelies Racing, TR Bonello, JM Zammit, M Aurisch, AP & TA Carney, Pierata Stallion
- Trainer: Greg Hickman
- Record: 26: 9–7–2
- Earnings: A$ 5,803,940

Major wins
- Vo Rogue Plate (2017); Missile Stakes (2018); Sydney Stakes (2018); All Aged Stakes (2019); The Shorts (2019)

Pierata (foaled 16 November 2014) is a Group 1 winning Australian thoroughbred racehorse and sire.

== Background ==
Pierata was sold for A$160,000 at the 2016 Magic Millions yearling sale.

== Racing career ==
As a 3 year old Pierata won the Vo Rogue Plate at Doomben Racecourse. Two weeks later he won the Magic Millions 3 year old Guineas and in doing so collected the largest prize money in the history of Queensland racing, A$ 1.2 million for first place as well as a $500,000 bonus for previous races won.

After 7 unsuccessful performances in Group 1 races, Pierata finally achieved Group 1 success in the 2019 All Aged Stakes at Royal Randwick Racecourse.

In the 2020 World's Best Racehorse Rankings, Pierata was rated on 118, making him the equal 80th best racehorse in the world.

== Stud career ==
Pierata was retired from racing in 2020 and was acquired by Aquis Farm to stand at their stud in the Hunter Region for a service fee of A$44,000.
