= Vo Rogue Plate =

- Class: Group 3
- Location: Doomben Racecourse or Eagle Farm Racecourse; Brisbane, Australia
- Inaugurated: 2006
- Race type: Thoroughbred - Flat racing
- Sponsor: Magic Millions (2018-2026)

Race information
- Distance: 1,300 - 1,400 metres
- Surface: Turf
- Track: Right-handed
- Qualification: Three year olds
- Weight: Set Weights colts and geldings – 57 kg fillies – 55 kg
- Purse: A$300,000 (2026)

Vo Rogue Plate is a registered Brisbane Racing Club Group 3 Thoroughbred horse race for three-year-olds run at set weights over a distance of 1350 metres at Doomben Racecourse, Brisbane, Queensland, Australia in late December or early January.

== History ==
=== Name ===
The race is named after Champion Queensland Racing Hall of Fame inductee, Vo Rogue, who was known for his front running style.

=== Distance ===
- 2006–2013 – 1350 metres
- 2014 – 1300 metres
- 2017 & 2018 – 1350 metres
- 2019 & 2020 - 1400 metres
- 2021 - 2023 - 1350 metres
- 2024 - 1300 metres

=== Grade ===
- 2006–2008 - Listed Race
- 2008 onwards - Group 3

=== Venue ===
- 2006–2013 - Doomben Racecourse
- 2014–2015 - Gold Coast Racecourse (due to renovations at Eagle Farm the BRC moved the event)
- 2016 - Eagle Farm Racecourse
- 2017 - Doomben Racecourse

== Winners ==
Previous winners of the race are as follows.

- 2026 - Ninja
- 2024 - Give Me Space
- 2023 - Cifrado
- 2022 (Dec) - Fashion Legend
- 2022 - Tiger Legend
- 2021 - Apache Chase
- 2019 - Alligator Blood
- 2018 - Boomsara
- 2017 - Pierata
- 2016 - Winning Rupert
- 2015 - Madotti
- 2014 - Mywayorthehighway
- 2013 - Enquare
- 2012 - Lucky Hussler
- 2011 - Punch On
- 2010 - Bennys Buttons
- 2009 - Graceful Anna
- 2008 (Dec.) - Youthful Jack
- †2008 (Mar.) - Dirty
- 2006 - Sequential Charm

† Race rescheduled due to equine influenza.

== See also ==
- List of Australian Group races
- Group races
