= Vain Stakes =

- Class: Group 3
- Location: Caulfield Racecourse
- Inaugurated: 1992
- Race type: Thoroughbred
- Sponsor: Tobin Brothers (2025 & 2026)

Race information
- Distance: 1,100 metres
- Surface: Turf
- Qualification: Three year old colts and geldings
- Weight: Set weights with penalties
- Purse: $200,000 (2026)

The Vain Stakes is a Group 3 Thoroughbred horse race for three year old colts and geldings held under set weights with penalties conditions, over a distance of 1100 metres, held at Caulfield Racecourse, Melbourne, Australia annually in August.

== History ==
=== Name ===
The race was first held in 1992 and is named in honour of the former champion racehorse and sire Vain.

=== Distance ===
- 1992–2005 – 1200 metres
- 2006–2008 – 1100 metres
- 2009 – 1200 metres
- 2010 onwards - 1100 metres

=== Grade ===
- 1992–2012 - Listed race
- 2013 - Group 3 status

=== Name ===
- 1992–1994 - Vain Quality Stakes
- 1995–2009 - Vain Stakes
- 2010 - Lister Diesel Stakes
- 2011 onwards - Vain Stakes

=== Venue ===
- 1992–1993 - held at Sandown Park Racecourse
- 1994 - Caulfield Racecourse
- 1995–1996 - held at Sandown Park Racecourse
- 1997 - Caulfield Racecourse
- 1998–2001 - held at Sandown Park Racecourse
- 2002 onwards - Caulfield Racecourse

== Winners ==
The following are past winners of the race.

- 2026 - Hard Kick
- 2025 - Jimmy Recard
- 2024 - Band Of Brothers
- 2023 - Cylinder
- 2022 - Giga Kick
- 2021 - Ingratiating
- 2020 - Our Playboy
- 2019 - Bivouac
- 2018 - Tony Nicconi
- 2017 - Jukebox
- 2016 - Russian Revolution
- 2015 - Gold Symphony
- 2014 - Get The Nod
- 2013 - Safeguard
- 2012 - Psychic Mick
- 2011 - Sepoy
- 2010 - Toorak Toff
- 2009 - Starspangledbanner
- 2008 - Fernandina
- 2007 - Shrewd Rhythm
- 2006 - Haradasun
- 2005 - Red Dazzler
- 2004 - Zankel
- 2003 - Happy Strike
- 2002 - Delago Brom
- 2001 - North Boy
- 2000 - Surtees
- 1999 - Dandy Kid
- 1998 - Splendid Horse
- 1997 - Schubert
- 1996 - Syncopated
- 1995 - Principality
- 1994 - Cannibal King
- 1993 - Star Of Maple
- 1992 - Never Undercharge

=== Recent multiple winners ===
Jockeys

- Damien Oliver: 2002, 2011 and 2022

Trainers

- James Cummings: 2020, 2022 and 2024
- Peter Snowden: 2012 and 2014. With Paul Snowden in 2017

== See also ==
- P B Lawrence Stakes
- Quezette Stakes
- List of Australian Group races
- Group races
