= Craig Williams (jockey) =

Australian jockey (born 1977)

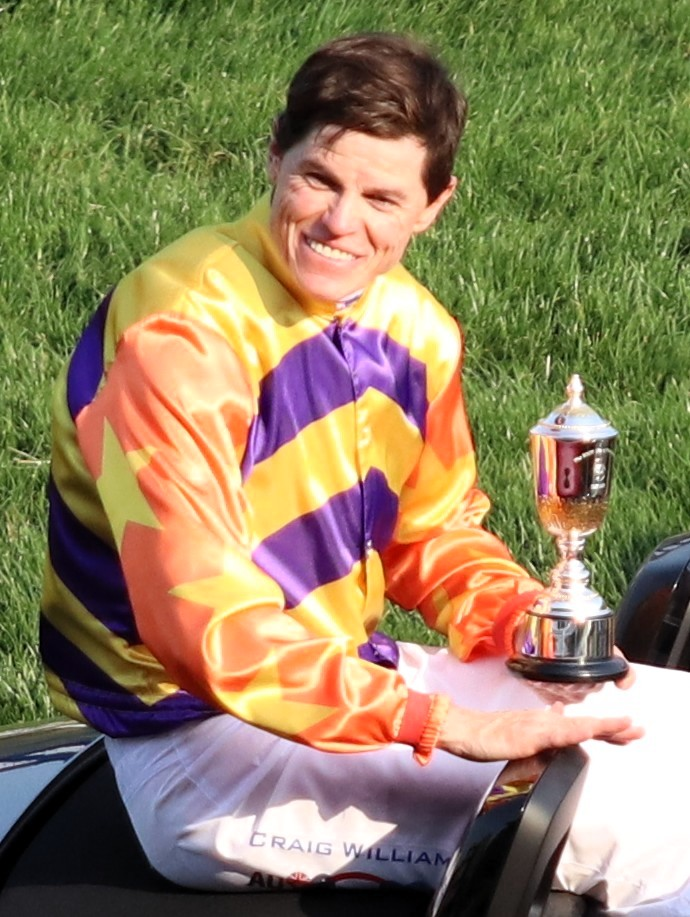
- Winning Ceremony at the Hong Kong Derby 2025

Personal information
- Born: 23 May 1977 (age 49) Victoria, Australia
- Occupation: Jockey

Horse racing career
- Sport: Horse racing

Major racing wins
- Al Quoz Sprint; Golden Slipper Stakes; Hong Kong Vase; Melbourne Cup; The Everest

Significant horses
- Behemoth, Giga Kick, Miss Finland, Vow And Declare, Mr Brightside, Bella Nipotina

Craig Williams (born 23 May 1977) is a jockey based in Victoria, Australia. He has won multiple group one races in Australia and worldwide, including the 2019 Melbourne Cup.

Williams rode his first race in 1993. In 2011, he almost achieved a unique Australian horse racing triple, in winning the Caulfield Cup, Cox Plate and Melbourne Cup. After winning the first two on Southern Speed and Pinker Pinker respectively, Williams was suspended for careless riding during the 2011 Bendigo Cup. The horse he was scheduled to ride in the Melbourne Cup, Dunaden, went on to win with last-minute replacement jockey Christophe Lemaire on board.

In the 2012 Caulfield Cup, Williams rode Dunaden to an unprecedented victory. A few days before the race Dunaden had drawn the outside barrier (barrier 22, although after scratchings it became barrier 18), and was also the top weighted horse for the race, carrying 58 kg. Dunaden had subsequently drifted in the betting odds, as no horse had ever won the Caulfield Cup from wider than barrier 15, nor carrying top weight. The win also made it back-to-back Caulfield Cup victories for Williams. In 2019, Williams rode Vow and Declare to win the Melbourne Cup in his 15th start in the race.

As of early July 2021, Williams has ridden 1,939 winners, including 62 Group One winners. He has won the Scobie Breasley Medal five times: in 2006, 2007, 2008, 2009 and 2017.

== Major wins ==
Australia

- All Aged Stakes - (1) - Giga Kick (2023)
- Australian Cup - (1) - Niconero (2009)
- Australian Guineas - (2) - Miss Finland (2007), Shamus Award (2014)
- Blue Diamond Stakes - (1) - Catchy (2017)
- Caulfield Cup - (2) - Southern Speed (2011), Dunaden (2012)
- Coolmore Stud Stakes - (2) - Show No Emotion (1997), September Run (2020)
- Cox Plate - (2) - Fields of Omagh (2006), Pinker Pinker (2011)
- Doncaster Handicap - (1) - Mr Brightside(2022)
- Doomben 10,000 - (2) - Giga Kick (2023), Bella Nipotina (2024)
- Empire Rose Stakes - (2) - Lyrical Bid (2006), Icebath (2022)
- Futurity Stakes - (3) - Niconero (2008, 2009), Brave Smash (2018)
- George Ryder Stakes - (1) - Gordon Lord Byron (2014)
- Golden Slipper Stakes - (1) - Miss Finland (2006)
- Kennedy Oaks - (2) - Miss Finland (2006), Brazilian Pulse (2010)
- Makybe Diva Stakes - (4) - Confectioner (2005), Littorio (2011), Southern Speed (2012), Mr Brightside (2023)
- Manikato Stakes - (2) - Loving Gaby (2019), Bella Nipotina (2022)
- Memsie Stakes - (4) - Miss Finland (2007), Vega Magic (2017), Behemoth (2020), Mr Brightside (2023)
- Melbourne Cup - (1) - Vow And Declare (2019)
- Moir Stakes - (1) - Virage De Fortune (2005)
- Orr Stakes - (1) - Hartnell (2018)
- Queen Elizabeth Stakes - (1) - Criterion (2015)
- Railway Stakes - (2) - Gathering (2010), Good Project (2015)
- Robert Sangster Stakes - (1) - Instant Celebrity (2021)
- Rosehill Guineas - (3) - De Beers (2006), Volkstok'n'barrell (2015), Castelvecchio (2020)
- Schweppes Oaks - (1) - Grand Echezeaux (2000)
- Sir Rupert Clarke Stakes - (6) - Barely A Moment (2005), Rewaaya (2006), Response (2010), Toorak Toff (2011), Stratum Star (2015), Behemoth (2020)
- Stradbroke Handicap - (2) - Sniper's Bullet (2007), Tofane (2021)
- Sydney Cup - (1) - Ista Kareem (2009)
- Tancred Stakes - (1) - Littorio (2010)
- Tattersall's Tiara - (1) - Tofane (2021)
- The Everest - (2) - Giga Kick (2022), Bella Nipotina (2024)
- The Galaxy - (2) - Nicconi (2009), Griante (2016)
- The Goodwood - (1) - Vega Magic (2017)
- The Thousand Guineas - (2) - Miss Finland (2006), Amphitrite (2018)
- TJ Smith Stakes - (1) - Master Of Design (2012)
- Toorak Handicap - (2) - Barely A Moment (2005), Fierce Impact (2019)
- Turnbull Stakes - (1) - Green Moon (2012)
- Underwood Stakes - (1) - Zaaki (2021)
- Victoria Derby - (1) - Kibbutz (2007)
- Vinery Stud Stakes - (1) - Miss Finland (2007)
- VRC Champions Mile - (2) - Best Of Days (2018), Fierce Impact (2019)
- VRC Champions Stakes - (1) - Alcopop (2012)
- William Reid Stakes - (3) - Hellbent (2018), Loving Gaby (2020), September Run (2022)
- Winterbottom Stakes - (2) - Ortensia (2009, 2011)

United Kingdom

- Dewhurst Stakes - (1) - Tobougg (2000)

France

- Prix de la Salamandre - (1) - Tobougg (2000)

United Arab Emirates

- Al Quoz Sprint - (1) - Ortensia (2012)

Japan

- Asahi Hai Futurity Stakes - (1) - Alfredo (2011)
- NHK Mile Cup - (1) - Grand Prix Boss (2011)
- Tenno Sho - (1) - Jaguar Mail (2010)

Singapore

- Singapore Gold Cup - (2) - Bahana (2016), Mr Clint (2019)

Hong Kong

- Hong Kong Vase - (1) - Dunaden (2011)
- Hong Kong Derby - (1) - Cap Ferrat (2025)
