= Redzel =

Australian-bred Thoroughbred racehorse

- Sire: Snitzel (AUS)
- Grandsire: Redoute's Choice (AUS)
- Dam: Millrich (AUS)
- Damsire: Rubiton (AUS)
- Sex: Gelding
- Foaled: 2012
- Country: Australia
- Colour: Bay
- Breeder: LJ Fleming
- Owner: Triple Crown Syndications, Ten Players, J N Allen, Walfam No 2, P Piras, V P Chau, T W Cheng, M R Waddington, A Gibson, A Kuok, J W Medland, T Kocovski, P Di Marco, L Halloran, M E Hardwick, B D Playford, D D Yates, A Savage
- Trainer: Gerald Ryan (2015); Peter & Paul Snowden (2015-2020)
- Record: 39: 15–10-3
- Earnings: $16,444,000

Major wins
- The Resimax Stakes (2016); Hall Mark Stakes (2017); Doomben 10,000 (2017); Concorde Stakes (2017, 2018, 2019); The Shorts (2017); The Everest (2017, 2018); Darley Classic (2017); Challenge Stakes (2018)
- Last updated on 28 December 2019

Redzel (foaled 19 September 2012) is an Australian thoroughbred racehorse. He races in the Triple Crown Syndication silks for a group of owners who bought into the gelding as a yearling. Redzel is known around the stables as Richie after the New Zealand Rugby player, Richie McCaw. Snowden Racing foreman, Lindy Wharekura is originally from New Zealand and came up with the name "after the greatest ever Captain, of the greatest ever team". The hashtag #richiefortheeverest trended on social media leading into the inaugural Everest Race largely thanks to the popular following Redzel has amongst the Snowden stable staff.

Redzel was purchased from the 2014 Magic Millions Gold Coast Yearling sale by Triple Crown Syndications directors Chris and Michael Ward for $120,000. He is out of the mare, Millrich and by Snitzel. Redzel was Millrich's 10th living foal. She died shortly after Redzel was born and Redzel was fostered onto another mare who would raise the orphan foal. Stud Manager, Kim Alderton remembers Redzel as a foal, "He was such a burly foal. Some orphans are shy to go for a drink and difficult to foster, but he was just so pushy, and straight in there for some milk. He muscled his way onto his foster mare, Regal Arena, who could be difficult, but he didn’t give her a choice."

In his first season racing, Redzel was third in the Group 3 Kindergarten Stakes. He continued to show promise but was shy of hitting the board in his following starts. The decision was made to geld him at the end of the 2015 season, which would prove the turning point in his career.

In 2017 Redzel was the inaugural winner of the world's richest turf race, The Everest, collecting first prize money of $5,800,000.

In 2018 Redzel led all the way to win the second running of The Everest, collecting first prize money of $6,000,000.

In the 2020 World's Best Racehorse Rankings, Redzel was rated on 118, making him the equal 80th best racehorse in the world.

Redzel is retired and living on a farm outside Sydney with other retired racehorses.
