= Quezette Stakes =

- Class: Group 3
- Location: Caulfield Racecourse
- Inaugurated: 1992
- Race type: Thoroughbred
- Sponsor: Quayclean (2026)

Race information
- Distance: 1,100 metres
- Surface: Turf
- Qualification: Three year old fillies
- Weight: Set weights with penalties
- Purse: $200,000 (2026)

The Quezette Stakes is a Melbourne Racing Club Group 3 Thoroughbred horse race for three-year-old fillies held under set weights with penalties conditions, over a distance of 1100 metres, held at Caulfield Racecourse, Melbourne, Australia annually in August.

== History ==
=== Name ===
The race first held in 1992 is in honour of the 1967 Merson Cooper Stakes (Listed Race) winner Quezette, who won seven races in her two-year-old season and was placed in the Group 1 Crown Oaks as a three-year-old. Quezette established the Australian record for five furlongs in 56.4 seconds. In 2016 the event was run as the Winslow Group Stakes.

=== Distance ===
- 1992–2005 – 1200 metres
- 2006 onwards - 1100 metres

=== Grade ===
- 1994–2012 - Listed race
- 2013 - Group 3 status

=== Venue ===
- 1992–1996 - Sandown Park Racecourse
- 1997 - Caulfield Racecourse
- 1998–2001 - Sandown Park Racecourse
- 2002 onwards - Caulfield Racecourse

== Winners ==
The following are past winners of the race.

- 2026 - Natural Fling
- 2025 - Feriva
- 2024 - Drifting
- 2023 - Charm Stone
- 2022 - Bound For Home
- 2021 - Gimmie Par
- 2020 - Bella Nipotina
- 2019 - Exhilarates
- 2018 - Sunlight
- 2017 - Crown Witness
- 2016 - I Am A Star
- 2015 - Petits Filous
- 2014 - Sabatini
- 2013 - Kiss A Rose
- 2012 - Elite Elle
- 2011 - Satin Shoes
- 2010 - Panipique
- 2009 - Corsaire
- 2008 - Viennese
- 2007 - Bel Mer
- 2006 - La Vie Amour
- 2005 - Pinezero
- 2004 - Alinghi
- 2003 - French Bid
- 2002 - Innovation Girl
- 2001 - La Lagune
- 2000 - So Gorgeous
- 1999 - Stella Artois
- 1998 - Bright Side
- 1997 - Accept
- 1996 - Ascorbic
- 1995 - Bracken Bank
- 1994 - Love Of Mary
- 1993 - Tristalove
- 1992 - Minsky Lass

=== Recent multiple winners ===
Jockeys

- Damien Oliver: 2002, 2005, 2013 and 2016

Trainers

- Peter Moody: 2007, 2011, 2014 and 2022
- Mick Price: 2004 and 2008 and with Michael Kent in 2024

== See also ==
- P B Lawrence Stakes
- Vain Stakes
- List of Australian Group races
- Group races
