= Classique Legend =

Australian thoroughbred racehorse

- Sire: Not A Single Doubt
- Grandsire: Redoute's Choice
- Dam: Pinocchio
- Damsire: Encosta De Lago
- Sex: Gelding
- Foaled: 8 September 2015
- Country: Australia
- Colour: Grey
- Breeder: Wallings Bloodstock
- Owner: Bon Ho
- Trainer: Les Bridge
- Jockey: Kerrin McEvoy
- Record: 15: 6-2-2
- Earnings: A$9,385,500

Major wins
- Arrowfield 3YO Sprint (2019); The Shorts (2020); The Everest (2020)

Classique Legend (Chinese: 川河達駒, foaled 8 September 2015) is an Australian bred thoroughbred racehorse that is most notable for winning the 2020 running of The Everest.

== Background ==
Classique Legend was sold for A$400,000 at the 2017 Inglis Classic Yearling sale. He was purchased for Hong Kong businessman Mr Bon Ho.

== Racing career ==
Classique Legend won at his race debut as a three-year-old on the 20 February 2019 at Randwick. He then went on to win two of his next three starts, culminating in victory in the Arrowfield 3YO Sprint.

At just his eighth career start, Classique Legend raced in The Everest of 2019, where he finished an unlucky sixth placing, beaten 2.5 lengths behind Yes Yes Yes. Jockey Nash Rawiller said after the race, "I was pretty luckless. I never got a run at all when I needed it."

After victories in the 2020 June Stakes and The Shorts, Classique Legend started the $4.20 favourite in the 2020 edition of The Everest. Jockey Kerrin McEvoy settled him well back in the field but he went on to defeat Bivouac by 2.5 lengths.

== Pedigree ==
Pedigree of Classique Legend (AUS) 2015
Sire Not A Single Doubt (AUS) 2001	Redoute's Choice (AUS); 1996	Danehill	Danzig
Sire Not A Single Doubt (AUS) 2001	Redoute's Choice (AUS); 1996	Danehill	Razyana
Sire Not A Single Doubt (AUS) 2001	Redoute's Choice (AUS); 1996	Shantha's Choice	Canny Lad
Sire Not A Single Doubt (AUS) 2001	Redoute's Choice (AUS); 1996	Shantha's Choice	Dancing Show
Sire Not A Single Doubt (AUS) 2001	Singles Bar (AUS); 1991	Rory's Jester	Crown Jester
Sire Not A Single Doubt (AUS) 2001	Singles Bar (AUS); 1991	Rory's Jester	Rory's Rocket
Sire Not A Single Doubt (AUS) 2001	Singles Bar (AUS); 1991	Easy Date	Grand Chaudiere
Sire Not A Single Doubt (AUS) 2001	Singles Bar (AUS); 1991	Easy Date	Scampering
Dam Pinocchio (AUS) 2009	Encosta De Lago (AUS); 1993	Fairy King	Northern Dancer
Dam Pinocchio (AUS) 2009	Encosta De Lago (AUS); 1993	Fairy King	Fairy Bridge
Dam Pinocchio (AUS) 2009	Encosta De Lago (AUS); 1993	Shoal Creek	Star Way
Dam Pinocchio (AUS) 2009	Encosta De Lago (AUS); 1993	Shoal Creek	Rolls
Dam Pinocchio (AUS) 2009	Surrealist (AUS); 1996	Kenny's Best Pal	Bletchingly
Dam Pinocchio (AUS) 2009	Surrealist (AUS); 1996	Kenny's Best Pal	Eau d'Etoile
Dam Pinocchio (AUS) 2009	Surrealist (AUS); 1996	Sunset Beach	Kenmare
Dam Pinocchio (AUS) 2009	Surrealist (AUS); 1996	Sunset Beach	Hula Gold
