= The Heath 1100 =

The Heath 1100 Stakes
- Class: Group 3
- Location: Caulfield Racecourse, Melbourne, Australia
- Inaugurated: 2005 (Listed Race)
- Race type: Thoroughbred
- Sponsor: Quayclean (2026)

Race information
- Distance: 1,100 metres
- Surface: Turf
- Track: Left-handed
- Qualification: Horses four years old and older
- Weight: Set weights with penalties
- Purse: $200,000 (2026)

The Heath 1100 Stakes, is a registered Melbourne Racing Club Group 3 Thoroughbred open horse race held under set weight conditions with penalties, for horses aged four years old and older, over a distance of 1100 metres, held at Caulfield Racecourse, Melbourne, Australia.

== History ==
The Heath is the local historical name for Caulfield Racecourse.

=== Name ===
- prior 2001 - Thomas North Handicap
- 2002 - GB Galvanising Sprint
- 2003 - Australian Racing Museum Plate
- 2004–2005 - Jayco Plate
- 2006 - The Heath 1100
- 2007 - Martha Cove Classic
- 2008–2010 - Clams Seafood Stakes
- 2011 - Slickpix Stakes
- 2012–2015 - theshark.com.au Stakes
- 2016 - The Resimax Stakes
- 2017–2023 - The Heath 1100
- 2024 - Vale Black Caviar
- 2025 onwards - The Heath 1100

=== Distance ===
- 2002 onwards - 1100 metres

=== Grade ===
- prior 2004 - Handicap (unlisted)
- 2005–2012 - Listed race
- 2013 onwards - Group 3

=== Venue ===
- 2002 onwards - Caulfield Racecourse

== Winners ==
The following are past winners of the race.

- 2026 - Oliveanotherday
- 2025 - Tropicus
- 2024 - Recommendation
- 2023 - Asfoora
- 2022 - Shooting For Gold
- 2021 - Masked Crusader
- 2020 - Diamond Effort
- 2019 - Crystal Dreamer
- 2018 - Ball Of Muscle
- 2017 - Voodoo Lad
- 2016 - Redzel
- 2015 - Bounding
- 2014 - Flamberge
- 2013 - Samaready
- 2012 - Golden Archer
- 2011 - Atomic Force
- 2010 - Rightfully Yours
- 2009 - First Command
- 2008 - Bel Mer
- 2007 - Undue
- 2006 - Shadoways
- 2005 - Classiconi
- 2004 - Monahan Tweed
- 2003 - Lovely Jubly
- 2002 - Crystal Finale

== See also ==
- Memsie Stakes
- HDF McNeil Stakes
- Courtza Stakes
- List of Australian Group races
- Group races
