= Trekking (horse) =

Australian Thoroughbred racehorse

- Sire: Street Cry
- Grandsire: Machiavellian
- Dam: Outdoor
- Damsire: Redoute's Choice
- Sex: Gelding
- Foaled: 2014
- Country: Australia
- Colour: Bay
- Breeder: Darley Australia
- Owner: Godolphin
- Trainer: John O'Shea (2016-2017); James Cummings (2017 onwards)
- Record: 43: 10–6–6
- Earnings: A$ 5,862,670

Major wins
- Hall Mark Stakes (2019); Stradbroke Handicap (2019); Schillaci Stakes (2019); The Goodwood (2020)

Trekking (foaled 20 October 2014) is a multiple Group 1 winning Australian thoroughbred racehorse.

== Background ==
Trekking was bred at the Australian Darley Stud and was sired by the stallion Street Cry.

== Racing career ==
Trekking made a successful debut as a 2 year old when ridden to victory by James Doyle at Rosehill Racecourse as a 9/10 favourite.

At his following start Trekking finished 2nd in the Black Opal Stakes before finishing 12th in the Golden Slipper behind She Will Reign when ridden by William Buick.

As a 4 year old Trekking achieved Group 1 success in the Stradbroke Handicap when ridden by Kerrin McEvoy at odds of 6/1

Trekking won his second Group 1 race when successful in The Goodwood at Morphettville Racecourse.

In the 2020 World's Best Racehorse Rankings, Trekking was rated on 118, making him the equal 80th best racehorse in the world.

== Pedigree ==
Pedigree of Trekking (AUS) 2014
Sire Street Cry (IRE) 1998	Machiavellian (USA); 1987	Mr. Prospector	Raise a Native
Sire Street Cry (IRE) 1998	Machiavellian (USA); 1987	Mr. Prospector	Gold Digger
Sire Street Cry (IRE) 1998	Machiavellian (USA); 1987	Coup De Folie	Halo
Sire Street Cry (IRE) 1998	Machiavellian (USA); 1987	Coup De Folie	Raise The Standard
Sire Street Cry (IRE) 1998	Helen Street (GB); 1982	Troy	Petingo
Sire Street Cry (IRE) 1998	Helen Street (GB); 1982	Troy	La Milo
Sire Street Cry (IRE) 1998	Helen Street (GB); 1982	Waterway	Riverman
Sire Street Cry (IRE) 1998	Helen Street (GB); 1982	Waterway	Boulevard
Dam Outdoor (AUS) 2008	Redoute's Choice (AUS); 1996	Danehill	Danzig
Dam Outdoor (AUS) 2008	Redoute's Choice (AUS); 1996	Danehill	Razyana
Dam Outdoor (AUS) 2008	Redoute's Choice (AUS); 1996	Shanthas Choice	Canny Lad
Dam Outdoor (AUS) 2008	Redoute's Choice (AUS); 1996	Shanthas Choice	Dancing Show
Dam Outdoor (AUS) 2008	Serenade Rose (AUS); 2002	Stravinsky	Nureyev
Dam Outdoor (AUS) 2008	Serenade Rose (AUS); 2002	Stravinsky	Fire The Groom
Dam Outdoor (AUS) 2008	Serenade Rose (AUS); 2002	Rose Of Tralee	Sadler's Wells
Dam Outdoor (AUS) 2008	Serenade Rose (AUS); 2002	Rose Of Tralee	Circus Ring
