= Coolmore Stud =

Horserace breeding operation, Ireland

Coolmore Stud, in Fethard, County Tipperary, Ireland, is the headquarters of one of the world's largest breeding operation of thoroughbred racehorses. Through its racing arm, Ballydoyle, Coolmore also has raced many classic winners and champions. The operation, which is currently owned and run by the Magnier family, has been associated with a long sequence of top-class stallions since the 1850s, originally in County Cork, where stallions still stand as part of Coolmore today.

Coolmore was once home to champion sires Sadler's Wells, Danehill, and Galileo.

== Coolmore Ireland ==
Coolmore was originally a relatively small farm dedicated to general agriculture, but came into the Vigors family in 1945 when a training operation was established there. It was inherited by Tim Vigors, famous fighter pilot in the Battle of Britain and in the Far East. Having left the air force, he firstly joined Goffs bloodstock auctioneers before setting up his own bloodstock agency in 1951. He moved to Coolmore in 1968 and began transforming it into the well known stud farm it is today.

Vigors went into partnership with his friend Vincent O'Brien, a leading racehorse trainer, and Robert Sangster, the Vernons pools magnate. He later sold his interest to O'Brien and his son-in-law, John Magnier. Eventually, Magnier became sole owner, and built the farm into a multi-national, multibillion-euro operation. The farm currently occupies over 7,000 acres.

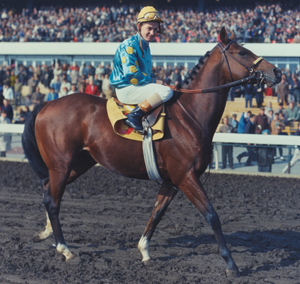
Northern Dancer would play a crucial role in Coolmore's success

In the mid-1970s, Coolmore became very active in the American sales market, displaying particular interest in the offspring of Northern Dancer. Their first significant purchase was The Minstrel, a dual classic winner in 1977. Other purchases included Alleged, Storm Bird, Caerleon, Be My Guest and El Gran Senor. The bidding duels between Coolmore and the Maktoum brothers of Dubai became legendary, leading to a bloodstock boom in the 1980s.

Coolmore's first major homebred was Sadler's Wells, a son of Northern Dancer born in Kentucky at Sangster's Swettenham Stud. In 1984, Sadler's Wells won the Irish 2,000 Guineas, the Eclipse Stakes and the Irish Champion Stakes and was named the champion miler in France. Retired to stud at Coolmore, Sadler's Wells went on to be the fourteen-time leading sire in Great Britain and Ireland. Sadler's Wells leading offspring include Galileo, Montjeu and High Chaparral, all of whom became important sires at Coolmore.

In 1990, Coolmore purchased a half-interest in Danehill, a grandson of Northern Dancer, and began shuttling him between Ireland and Australia. Danehill became a champion sire first in Australia and then in Europe, siring well over 300 stakes winners. His sons include current Coolmore stallions Rock of Gibraltar, Dylan Thomas, Fastnet Rock and Holy Roman Emperor.

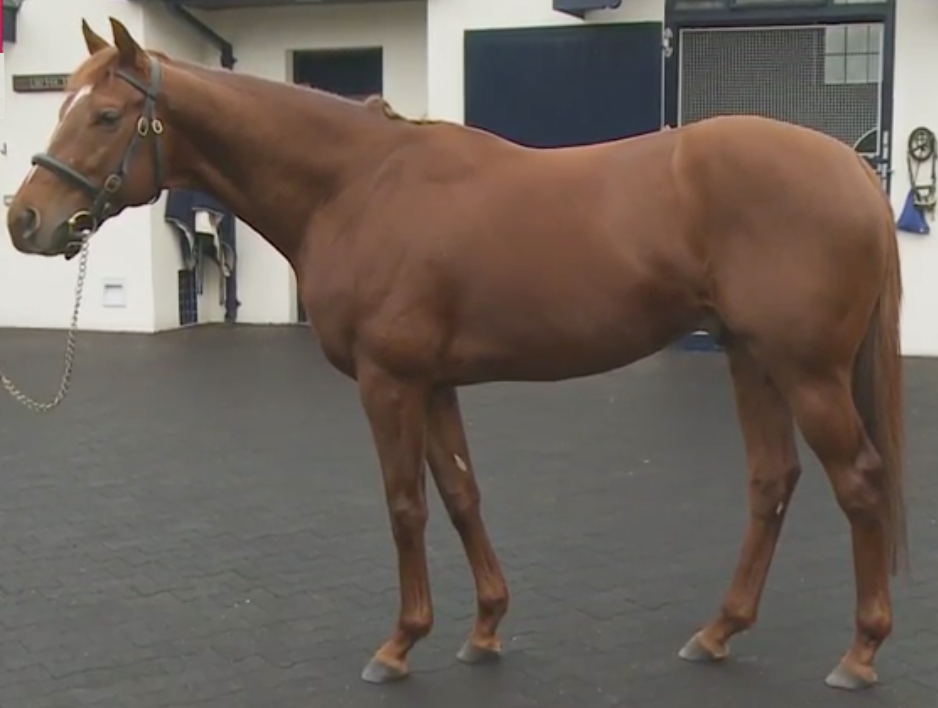
New sire Australia in 2015

Coolmore's current leading sire was Galileo, who as of 2022 has led the leading sire list twelve times, unfortunately on the 10 July 2021 Galileo had to be euthanised. With the victory of Minding in the 2016 1000 Guineas, Galileo has sired at least one winner in each of British Classic Races. Several of Galileo's sons are currently standing at Coolmore, including classic winners Australia and Gleneagles.

Although the stallion operation receives the most attention, Coolmore also maintains a large broodmare band and boards mares for clients. Coolmore is active at major breeding stock sales, looking for mares that are best suited to its stallions. For example, in 2012 Coolmore paid $5 million for Untouched Talent, already the dam of grade 1 winner Bodemeister, with plans to breed her to Galileo. In 2016, Coolmore announced that Untouched Talent was the first mare confirmed in foal to American Pharoah.

== Branches ==
The original farm is now known as Coolmore Ireland, and has three branches: Coolmore Australia, Ashford Stud, which operates as Coolmore America, and Coolmore National Hunt (or Castle Hyde Stud) in Ireland, which specialises in breeding for National Hunt racing. Coolmore has many "shuttle stallions" that cover mares in either Ireland or Kentucky in the northern breeding season and are transported to Australia and South America for the southern breeding season.

=== Coolmore America (Ashford Stud) ===
Ashford Stud, located near Versailles, Kentucky, became a part of Coolmore in the mid-1980s. In 2001, Thunder Gulch was the first Ashford sire to top the American general sire listing. Giant's Causeway later became the leading sire in 2009, 2010 and 2012. Ashford also stands Uncle Mo, leading first year sire of 2015 and sire of 2016 Kentucky Derby winner Nyquist.

Whereas most stallions standing at Coolmore Ireland are now homebreds, most of those standing at Ashford Stud had their breeding rights purchased during their racing career. For example, in May 2015 it was announced that Ashford Stud had purchased the breeding rights to American Pharoah from Ahmed Zayat in late 2014 for a reported $13.8 million. American Pharoah went on to become the first racehorse in 37 years to win the American Triple Crown, and the first ever to win the Grand Slam of Thoroughbred racing by winning the 2015 Breeders' Cup Classic.

=== Coolmore Australia ===
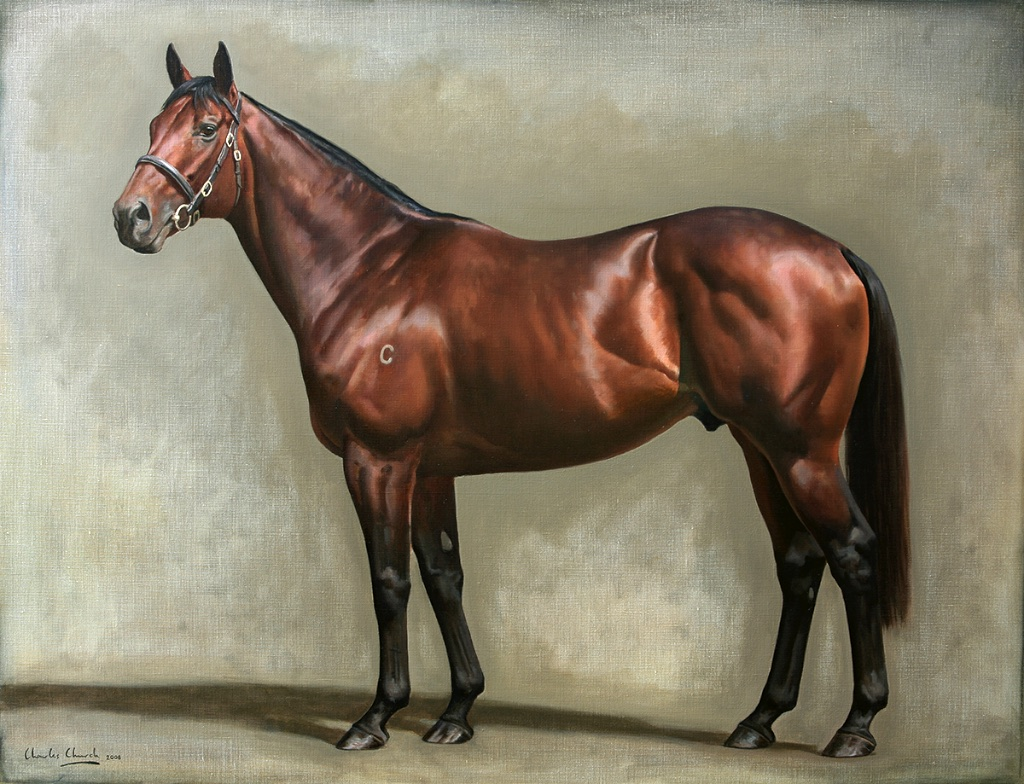
Fastnet Rock by Charles Church

Coolmore Australia, located near Jerrys Plains in the Hunter Valley of New South Wales, is a 3,340 ha farm that has approximately 1,000 horses, including 600 mares that produce about 300 foals there during the spring. The stallion roster includes several permanent sires such as Choisir and Fastnet Rock, plus others who shuttle from the northern hemisphere on a rotating basis.

The farm was founded in 1824 and purchased by Coolmore in 1996. Danehill first made his reputation here, becoming the leading sire in Australia nine times. Encosta de Lago also led the sire list twice before being retired from breeding in 2015. Fastnet Rock, still standing at Coolmore Australia, has led the Australian sire list twice.

=== National Hunt ===
Coolmore's National Hunt division consists of three farms in Ireland: Grange Stud, Beeches Stud and Castlehyde Stud. The Magnier family has been breeding horses for the National Hunt since the 1850s. Over the generations, they have stood several outstanding jump stallions, including 14-time leading sire Deep Run, and 4-time leader Be My Native. Although Sadler's Wells was never a National Hunt sire per se, several champion hurdlers trace back to him. Yeats, a son of Sadler's Wells renowned for his staying ability, now stands at Castlehyde Stud, in the 2021-22 jumps season Yeats became Champion Sire for the first time.

== Stallions standing at Coolmore (April 2026) ==
=== Flat ===
- Acrobat (Australia)
- Adelaide (Australia)
- Auguste Rodin (Ireland and New Zealand)
- Australia (Ireland)
- Best of Bordeaux (Australia)
- Blackbeard (Ireland)
- Camelot (Ireland)
- Camille Pissarro (Ireland)
- Churchill (Ireland and Australia)
- Citizen Bull (USA)
- City of Troy (Ireland and Australia)
- Corniche (USA)
- Delacroix (Ireland and Australia)
- Echo Town (USA)
- Epicenter (USA)
- Fierceness (USA)
- Footstepsinthesand (Ireland)
- Gleneagles (Ireland)
- Golden Pal (USA)
- Gunite (USA)
- Henri Matisse (Ireland)
- Henry Longfellow (Ireland and Australia)
- Holy Roman Emperor (Ireland)
- Home Affairs (Australia)
- Jack Christopher (USA)
- Justify (USA and Australia)
- King's Legacy (Australia)
- Little Big Bear (Ireland)
- Mo Town (USA)
- Munnings (USA)
- No Nay Never (Ireland)
- Paddington (Ireland and New Zealand)
- Pierro (Australia)
- Practical Joke (USA)
- Pride of Dubai (Australia)
- Private Life (Australia)
- Saxon Warrior (Ireland)
- Shinzo (Australia)
- Sierra Leone (USA)
- Sioux Nation (Ireland)
- St Mark's Basilica (Ireland and Australia)
- Starspangledbanner (Ireland)
- Storm Boy (Australia)
- Super Seth (Australia)
- Switzerland (Australia)
- The Antarctic (Ireland)
- Tiz the Law (USA)
- Yes Yes Yes (Australia)

=== National Hunt ===
- Crystal Ocean (The Beeches Stud)
- Getaway (Grange Stud)
- Hurricane Lane (Grange Stud)
- In Swoop (The Beeches Stud)
- Kyprios
- Los Angeles (Castlehyde Stud)
- Luxembourg (Castlehyde Stud)
- Maxios (Castlehyde Stud)
- Order of St George (Castlehyde Stud)
- Pyledriver (The Beeches Stud)
- Santiago (Castlehyde Stud)
- Vadamos (Grange Stud)
- Walk In The Park (Grange Stud)
- Wings of Eagles (The Beeches Stud)
- Yeats (Castlehyde Stud)
