= Concorde Stakes (Australia) =

Horse race in Sydney, Australia

- Class: Group 2
- Location: Randwick Racecourse, Sydney, Australia
- Inaugurated: 1990
- Race type: Thoroughbred - flat
- Sponsor: Catanach's Jewellers (2026)

Race information
- Distance: 1,000 metres
- Surface: Turf
- Track: Right-handed
- Qualification: Horses three years old and older
- Weight: Set weights with penalties
- Purse: A$1,000,000 (2026)

The Concorde Stakes is a City Tattersalls Club Group 2 Thoroughbred horse race for horses three years old and older run over a distance of 1000 metres with set weights with penalties conditions at Randwick Racecourse, Sydney, Australia, in late August or early September.

== History ==
Originally this race was run by the Sydney Turf Club, but after the merger of clubs in the Sydney area the race was scheduled in 2011 as part of the City Tattersalls Club meeting.

=== Grade ===
- 1990–1996 - Listed Race
- 1997–2025 - Group 3
- 2026 onwards - Group 2

=== Venue ===
- 1990–2010 - Rosehill
- 2011–2012 - Warwick Farm
- 2013 onwards - Randwick

== Winners ==
The following are past winners of the race.

- 2026 - Tempted
- 2025 - Headwall
- 2024 - I Am Me
- 2023 - Remarque
- 2022 - Eduardo
- 2021 - Nature Strip
- 2020 - Gytrash
- 2019 - Redzel
- 2018 - Redzel
- 2017 - Redzel
- 2016 - Felines
- 2015 - Shiraz
- 2014 - Wouldn't It Be Nice
- 2013 - Decision Time
- 2012 - Tiger Tees
- 2011 - Decision Time
- 2010 - Reward For Effort
- 2009 - Friday Creek
- 2008 - Typhoon Zed
- 2007 - †race not held
- 2006 - Mustard
- 2005 - Red Oog
- 2004 - Taikun
- 2003 - Private Steer
- 2002 - Fouardee
- 2001 - Phoenix Park
- 2000 - Condotti
- 1999 - Guineas
- 1998 - Confiscate
- 1997 - Armidale
- 1996 - race not held
- 1995 - Victoria Park
- 1994 - Just Awesome
- 1993 - Deposition
- 1992 - Final Card
- 1991 - Joanne
- 1990 - West Dancer

† Not held because of outbreak of equine influenza

== See also ==
- Chelmsford Stakes
- Furious Stakes
- Tramway Stakes
- List of Australian Group races
- Group races
