= Nature Strip (horse) =

Australian Thoroughbred racehorse

- Racing silks of Nature Strip
- Sire: Nicconi (AUS)
- Grandsire: Bianconi (USA)
- Dam: Strikeline (AUS)
- Damsire: Desert Sun (GB)
- Sex: Gelding
- Foaled: 16 November 2014
- Country: Australia
- Colour: Chestnut
- Breeder: Golden Grove Stud Farm
- Owner: RAE Lyons, PD Harrison, PN Kean, SW Hansen, GL Smith, JP (Jack) Van Duuren, PJ Balderstone, KC Garland, DJ McCluskey, CA Bennett, GD Dumesny, F Giampaolo, DJ McShane, DJ Slocum, TG McHenry, CJ Harrison, DT Harrison
- Trainer: Robert Smerdon (2017-2018); Robert Hickmott (2018); John Sadler (2018); Darren Weir (2018); Chris Waller (2019-2023)
- Jockey: James McDonald
- Record: 44: 22-8–1
- Earnings: A$20,755,008

Major wins
- McEwen Stakes (2018); Rubiton Stakes (2019); The Galaxy (2019); Moir Stakes (2019); Darley Sprint Classic (2019, 2021); Challenge Stakes (2020); TJ Smith Stakes (2020, 2021, 2022); Black Caviar Lightning (2021); Concorde Stakes (2021); The Everest (2021); King's Stand Stakes (2022); The Shorts (2022)

Awards
- Australian Racehorse of the Year (2019/20), (2021/22); Australian Sprinter of the Year (2019/20), (2020/21), (2021/22)

Nature Strip (foaled 16 November 2014) is a retired champion Thoroughbred racehorse who was the 2020 and 2022 Australian Champion Racehorse of the Year, a nine-time Group 1 winner, and the winner of The Everest in 2021, the richest turf race in the world.

== Background ==
Nature Strip was passed in for $90,000 at the 2016 Inglis Premier Yearling sale and sent to trainer Robert Smerdon by breeders Golden Grove Farm. Smerdon sold five 1% shares in the then un-named horse, before convincing retired businessman Rod Lyons to buy 85% and farmer Peter Baulderstone to take the remaining 10%, with the value set at $120,000. Lyons sold down part of his stake to various interests including a New Zealand-based group featuring Sir Stephen Hansen, World Cup-winning rugby coach. The horse was named from dam Strikeline and the practice of Australian factory workers to gather on the nature strip outside their place of work during industrial disputes.

== Racing career ==
=== Aquanita and 3YO season 2017/18 ===
Nature Strip, trained initially by Robert Smerdon, won on debut as a 3-year-old, in a 1000m maiden at Mornington on October 17, 2017. He was beaten at his next and first metropolitan start but won the next three races he contested including the Inglis Dash over 1100m at Flemington in January, 2018. Robert Hickmott was in temporary charge due to Smerdon being suspended, but by the time of his next start, John Sadler (part of Smerdon's Aquanita group) had taken charge of Nature Strip. The horse was beaten at his two autumn 2018 starts, including the Group 2 Euclase Stakes in Adelaide. Nature Strip pulled up poorly after the race. Following those failures, the owners transferred Nature Strip to Darren Weir's stables, mainly due to the doping scandal engulfing the Aquanita organisation.

=== Darren Weir, Chris Waller and 4YO season 2018/19 ===
Nature Strip proceeded to win his first four starts under Weir through winter and early spring 2018, including an impressive six-length win over Group 1 winner Sunlight in Adelaide. This was followed by his first group win, the Group 2 WFA McEwen Stakes at Moonee Valley on Sept. 8, 2018, where he also broke the 1000m track record. Nature Strip was selected as the Australian Turf Club's representative in the 2018 Everest at this stage. Three weeks later Nature Strip was the $1.75 favourite in his first Group 1 start, the Moir Stakes at Moonee Valley, but finished a disappointing eighth after being forced to race wide. The ATC removed Nature Strip from their Everest slot and the horse went for a spell.

In January 2019, Weir was arrested following a police raid on his Ballarat stables, principally over the use of 'jiggers' in training. Weir was subsequently disqualified and his horses were quickly transferred to other stables, with Nature Strip joining Sydney-based Chris Waller. Nature Strip was an impressive winner in his first start under Waller, the Group 2 Rubiton Stakes over 1100m at Caulfield in Melbourne on Feb 9, 2019. A fortnight later Nature Strip again failed at Group 1 level, fading badly to finish 10th in the Oakleigh Plate at Caulfield after starting the $2:30 favourite. Nature Strip was developing a reputation amongst some racing followers as an over-rated horse.

Nature Strip broke through for his maiden Group 1 victory at his next start in March 2019, narrowly holding on to win the 1100m Galaxy at Rosehill in Sydney, a race that his father, Nicconi won in 2009. Nature Strip went for a brief spell before tackling the Group 1 Doomben 10,000 in Queensland in May 2019. Again starting a short-priced favourite, he finished fourth with a wide draw and the use of ear-muffs proffered as excuses. In his next start Nature Strip struggled after over-racing in the Group 3 Concorde Stakes at Randwick, but bounced back to win the Moir Stakes at Moonee Valley following his loss a year earlier.

=== 5YO season, 2019/20 ===
Nature Strip was described as "the most polarizing horse in Australia" when selected for his inaugural attempt at The Everest in 2019. In the event Nature Strip, a $26 chance, finished fourth after leading but being overtaken with 100m remaining. In true enigmatic style, Nature Strip won his third Group 1 race for the year three weeks later, triumphing easily in the Darley Sprint Classic at Flemington. It was also his first win over 1200m.

Opening his 2020 campaign in February, Nature Strip finished fourth as the $1.45 favourite in the Group 1 Lightning Stakes over 1000m at Flemington. Waller said the horse was "too fresh" and would improve from the run. Duly, Nature Strip went on to win the G2 Challenge Stakes at Randwick at his next start, followed by his fourth Group 1 victory when successful at $3.80 in the TJ Smith Stakes. He was then given a spell prior to building towards the 2020 Everest. In August 2020, Nature Strip was named Victorian Racehorse of the Year. He was also voted the Australian Horse of the Year for the year 2019/20.

=== 6YO season, 2020/21 ===
Returning in spring 2020, Nature Strip as $1.40 favourite was run down late by Gytrash to finish second in the Concorde Stakes. He then played up at consecutive barrier trials before being beaten in the Group 2 Premiere Stakes and finishing seventh in the Everest. Nature Strip completed the year with a second place finish in the Darley Classic. Nevertheless, in the 2020 World's Best Racehorse Rankings, Nature Strip was rated on 124, making him the equal 10th best racehorse in the world.

On 13 February 2021, Nature Strip returned to win his fifth Group 1 race when successful in the Black Caviar Lightning at Flemington, with emerging star Jamie Kah riding. In April, Nature Strip won back-to-back T J Smith Stakes taking his Group 1 tally to six and turning the tables on Eduardo, who'd beaten him in the Challenge Stakes a fortnight earlier. Jockey James McDonald claimed after the race "I can safely say WBS (World’s Best Sprinter) for him.". Nature Strip was again spelled ahead of a spring campaign targeting the Everest.

=== 7YO season, 2021/22 ===
Nature Strip returned to win the Concorde Stakes at the third attempt on September 4, 2021, as the $1.50 favourite. On October 16, 2021 Nature Strip finally broke through to win the Everest at his third attempt, leading nearly all the way to triumph as the $3.30 favourite to claim the AUD$6.2 million first prize. The horse completed his best spring campaign by winning the Darley Sprint Classic during the Melbourne Cup Carnival, his second win in the race making it seven Group 1 victories and three in the 2021 calendar year. There was talk of Nature Strip travelling overseas to compete at Royal Ascot in 2022.

Nature Strip commenced his 2022 campaign being narrowly defeated by 3YO stablemate Home Affairs in the Black Caviar Lightning Stakes at Flemington, after being significantly hampered at the start. He was also beaten at his next start, by Eduardo in the Challenge Stakes on a heavy Randwick track. On April 1 Nature Strip won the TJ Smith Stakes at Randwick for the third consecutive year, comfortably defeating Eduardo and the remainder of the field and confirming his later trip to Royal Ascot. Only Chautauqua had previously won three TJ Smiths. On June 14 Nature Strip was a comfortable winner of the King's Stand Stakes at Royal Ascot, after starting second favourite at 9/4 ($3.25) behind US sprinter Golden Pal. "Nature Strip has just got better and better", Waller said. "He is learning about his racing, enjoying his racing, and that was the difference between the horse from his early days. He used to try and get things done in a hurry all the time. But then he realised he could sit off them and still beat his rivals. It has been a privilege to be a part of this horse." After the King's Stand win, Nature Strip was rated 126 making him the world's highest-rated sprinter and third-highest rated horse in the world behind the US horse Flightline and the UK's Baaeed. Nature Strip was voted Australian Horse of the Year and Sprinter of the Year for 2021-2022, winning the awards for the second and third time respectively.

=== 8YO season, 2022/23 ===
Nature Strip commenced his 2022 Australian spring campaign with victory in the G2 The Shorts over 1100m at Randwick on Sep 17. In The Everest of 2022 he started the race $1.90 favourite. Forced to race wide on a strong tempo, Nature Strip grabbed the lead in the straight but was run down in the final 50m to eventually finish fourth. The brave defeat continued Nature Strip's relatively moderate second-up record, with 2 wins from 10 second-up starts compared with 6/11 first-up and 7/10 third-up (as of Oct 15, 2022). For the fourth consecutive year, Nature Strip ended the calendar year competing in the G1 sprint race on the final day of the Melbourne Cup carnival (in 2022 named the Darley Champions Sprint) but was beaten into second, giving him two wins and two seconds in the race.

Commencing 2023, Nature Strip's program continued to follow a familiar pattern with a fourth consecutive attempt at the G1 Black Caviar Lightning Stakes. Starting $1.95 favorite, Nature Strip led but faded in the final 200m to finish sixth. Jockey James McDonald thought the horse 'felt the track' (a Good 3 in hot conditions) amid suggestions Nature Strip should be retired to 'go out on top'. On April 1 Nature Strip attempted to win the TJ Smith Stakes at Randwick for an unprecedented fourth time. He started $4.90 tote favourite in a competitive field and the recent pattern continued. Nature Strip strode to the lead inside the first 200m and kicked clear early in the straight to lead by about 3L, only to be overtaken in the final 100m by swooping finishers and cross the line in fourth place. Waller refused to consider retiring the horse at this stage, citing the need for a proper spell and confirming Nature Strip would return for a 'race by race' spring campaign.

=== Retirement ===
In the event, Nature Strip competed in just one more race, the 2023 G3 Concorde Stakes at Randwick on 2 September 2023. The now-9YO was forced to race wide, eventually finishing sixth. The horse was retired immediately after the race. Waller said "I'm announcing his retirement on behalf of the owners. He's just been an amazing horse and everything he does, he does to the best of his ability, even today, he was prepared well, he came to the race sound, he was trialling well...he jumped well, he travelled nicely, he looked to come up the rise well but the same acceleration and spark wasn't there. There has been no indication that race ability was not there anymore, but he wasn't the same horse in the race today. He's just been such an amazing horse, it's only fitting that we announce it as soon as the decision has been made."

Senior co-owner Rod Lyons said, "It's a sad day, we knew it would come, all champions come to the end of the road. I told Chris not to cry as I would start crying. I wish he could have won today and gone on. But he's been a wonderful horse and taken us to such magnificent heights. Who would have dreamt we would ever get a horse like him. To go to Royal Ascot will stay in our memories forever, and also for our kids and our grandkids' memories. It's been a joy and pleasure to race this horse...Today, he (Nature Strip) said: 'Boys, I have taken you around the world, I have done all I can possibly do for you, c'mon give me a break'. So, the horse is retired. I won't get another horse like him, not in a million years."

Nature Strip had 44 starts, winning 22 races including nine at Group 1 level and nearly AUD$21 million in prize money.

== Pedigree ==
Pedigree of Nature Strip (AUS), chestnut gelding, 2014
Sire Nicconi (AUS) 2005	Bianconi (USA); 1995	Danzig	Northern Dancer (CAN)
Sire Nicconi (AUS) 2005	Bianconi (USA); 1995	Danzig	Pas de Nom
Sire Nicconi (AUS) 2005	Bianconi (USA); 1995	Fall Aspen	Pretense
Sire Nicconi (AUS) 2005	Bianconi (USA); 1995	Fall Aspen	Change Water
Sire Nicconi (AUS) 2005	Nicola Lass (AUS); 1995	Scenic (IRE)	Sadler's Wells (USA)
Sire Nicconi (AUS) 2005	Nicola Lass (AUS); 1995	Scenic (IRE)	Idyllic (USA)
Sire Nicconi (AUS) 2005	Nicola Lass (AUS); 1995	Dubai Lass	Bletchingly
Sire Nicconi (AUS) 2005	Nicola Lass (AUS); 1995	Dubai Lass	Frivolous Lass (NZ)
Dam Strikeline (AUS) 2000	Desert Sun (GB); 1988	Green Desert (USA)	Danzig
Dam Strikeline (AUS) 2000	Desert Sun (GB); 1988	Green Desert (USA)	Foreign Courier
Dam Strikeline (AUS) 2000	Desert Sun (GB); 1988	Solar	Hotfoot
Dam Strikeline (AUS) 2000	Desert Sun (GB); 1988	Solar	L'Anguissola
Dam Strikeline (AUS) 2000	Stike High (AUS); 1989	Preemptive Strike (CAN)	Blushing Groom (FR)
Dam Strikeline (AUS) 2000	Stike High (AUS); 1989	Preemptive Strike (CAN)	Queen Maud
Dam Strikeline (AUS) 2000	Stike High (AUS); 1989	Flight Hostess	Zamazaan (FR)
Dam Strikeline (AUS) 2000	Stike High (AUS); 1989	Flight Hostess	Robins Flight (Family: 16-a)

- Nature Strip is inbred 3 × 4 to Danzig, meaning that this stallion appears in both the third and fourth generation of his pedigree.
