= Yes Yes Yes (horse) =

Australian thoroughbred racehorse

- Sire: Rubick
- Grandsire: Encosta De Lago
- Dam: Sin Sin Sin
- Damsire: Fantastic Light
- Sex: Colt
- Foaled: 2016
- Country: Australia
- Colour: Bay
- Breeder: Arlington Park Racing
- Owner: Yes Yes Yes, BF Sokolski, BR Broomhead, A Kheir, Property Heavyweights No 3, Ocean Five Racing, R Smykowsky, SM Thompson, OR Jackson, Winning Behaviours, CM Hay, MG Donegan, T Mehmet, WD Johnston, TWM Racing, The Golden Table, TK Kinsella-Neijs, S Inglis, Collins St Partners, P Caputo, J Walker
- Trainer: Darren Weir (Dec 2018 - Mar 2019); Chris Waller (Mar 19-current)
- Record: 8: 4–3–0
- Earnings: A$ 7,174,450

Major wins
- Todman Stakes (2019); The Everest (2019)

Awards
- Australian Three Year Old Colt/Gelding of the Year (2019/20)

Yes Yes Yes (foaled 26 September 2016) is a retired Australian thoroughbred racehorse. He won The Everest, and over seven million dollars.

== Background ==
Yes Yes Yes was purchased by Darren Weir Racing/John Foote Bloodstock for $200,000 at the Magic Millions yearling sale.

== Racing career ==
Yes Yes Yes made his debut at Moonee Valley on 1 December 2018, where he "ran on well" for a second. A fortnight later, he won his first race. After settling near the rear of the field, he "came through powerfully between horses inside the final 200m". Trainer Weir was then considering entering the Magic Millions Classic, saying, "He's got the right attitude and he's got the ability. It's a good prize money race so if he's holding together it would certainly be something to think about." He was then spelled instead.

In February 2019, trainer Darren Weir was banned for four years for the use of taser-like devices on his horses to improve performance. Yes Yes Yes was transferred to trainer Chris Waller. After a trial in February 2019, Yes Yes Yes resumed in the Group 2 Todman Stakes in March. Running last at the final bend, he won the race by half a length. Waller said, ""It's good to be able to take over a horse like this with prize money in the bank for the Slipper. Was good for my team to get familiar with the horse. We've had him for a number of weeks now, we picked out this race and full credit to the team where he has come from, they'd done a good job educating him well." As expected, Yes Yes Yes went on to the Golden Slipper, finishing seventh on a heavy track.

After a long spell, Yes Yes Yes had two trials in August. In September he raced in the Group 2 The Run to the Rose and the Group 1 Golden Rose, finishing second behind Bivouac in each.

In 2019, Yes Yes Yes was successful in The Everest at Randwick Racecourse. Trained by Chris Waller and ridden by Glen Boss, the colt won by half a length at odds of 8/1.

== Stud career ==
Yes Yes Yes was retired to stud duties at Coolmore Stud in February 2020 after sustaining a tendon injury. His initial service fee was listed as A$38,500.

== Pedigree ==
Pedigree of Yes Yes Yes (AUS), bay colt 2016
Sire Rubick (AUS) 2011	Encosta De Lago (AUS); 1993	Fairy King (USA)	Northern Dancer (CAN)
Sire Rubick (AUS) 2011	Encosta De Lago (AUS); 1993	Fairy King (USA)	Fairy Bridge
Sire Rubick (AUS) 2011	Encosta De Lago (AUS); 1993	Shoal Creek	Star Way (GB)
Sire Rubick (AUS) 2011	Encosta De Lago (AUS); 1993	Shoal Creek	Rolls (USA)
Sire Rubick (AUS) 2011	Sliding Cube (AUS); 2004	Rock of Gibraltar (IRE)	Danehill (USA)
Sire Rubick (AUS) 2011	Sliding Cube (AUS); 2004	Rock of Gibraltar (IRE)	Offshore Boom
Sire Rubick (AUS) 2011	Sliding Cube (AUS); 2004	Shanthas Choice	Canny Lad
Sire Rubick (AUS) 2011	Sliding Cube (AUS); 2004	Shanthas Choice	Dancing Show (USA)
Dam Sin Sin Sin (AUS) 2005	Fantastic Light (USA); 1996	Rahy	Blushing Groom (FR)
Dam Sin Sin Sin (AUS) 2005	Fantastic Light (USA); 1996	Rahy	Glorious Song (USA)
Dam Sin Sin Sin (AUS) 2005	Fantastic Light (USA); 1996	Jood	Nijinsky (CAN)
Dam Sin Sin Sin (AUS) 2005	Fantastic Light (USA); 1996	Jood	Kamar (CAN)
Dam Sin Sin Sin (AUS) 2005	Steam Heat (AUS); 1986	Salieri (USA)	Accipiter
Dam Sin Sin Sin (AUS) 2005	Steam Heat (AUS); 1986	Salieri (USA)	Hogan's Sister
Dam Sin Sin Sin (AUS) 2005	Steam Heat (AUS); 1986	Supaburn	Blazing Saddles
Dam Sin Sin Sin (AUS) 2005	Steam Heat (AUS); 1986	Supaburn	Vista Anna (Family: 22-d)
