= Champions Sprint (VRC) =

Horse race in Melbourne, Australia

Champions Sprint (VRC) registered as VRC Stakes
- Class: Group 1
- Location: Flemington Racecourse, Melbourne, Australia
- Inaugurated: 1960
- Race type: Thoroughbred
- Sponsor: Darley (since 2019)

Race information
- Distance: 1,200 metres
- Surface: Turf
- Track: straight
- Qualification: Three years old and older Maidens non eligible
- Weight: Weight for age
- Purse: $3,000,000 (2026)

The Champions Sprint, registered as the Victoria Racing Club Stakes, is a Victoria Racing Club Group One Thoroughbred horse race for horses aged three years old and over, under weight for age conditions, over a distance of 1200 metres held at Flemington Racecourse, Melbourne, Australia, on the last day of the VRC Spring Carnival.

== History ==
The race is considered one of the major sprints of the spring racing calendar. Prior to 2006 the race was held on the first day of the VRC Spring Carnival, Victoria Derby day, but was moved the following year to the last day of the carnival. In 2007 the sprint was also changed to weight-for-age conditions.

=== Name ===
- 1960–1979 - Craven 'A' Stakes
- 1980–1984 - Pure-Pak Stakes
- 1985–1993 - Gadsden Stakes
- 1994–1995 - Southcorp Packaging Stakes
- 1996–2006 - Salinger Stakes
- 2007 - The Age Classic
- 2008–2012 - Patinack Farm Classic
- 2013 - VRC Sprint Classic
- 2014–2017 - Darley Classic
- 2018 - VRC Sprint Classic
- 2019–2021 - Darley Sprint Classic
- 2022–2024 - Darley Champions Sprint
- 2025–present - VRC Champions Sprint

=== Distance ===
- 1960–1971 - 6 furlongs (~1200 metres)
- 1972 onwards - 1200 metres

=== Grade ===
- 1960–1978 - Principal Race
- 1979 onwards - Group 1

== Winners ==
The following are past winners of the race.

- 2026 - Point Barrow
- 2025 - Giga Kick
- 2024 - Sunshine In Paris
- 2023 - Imperatriz
- 2022 - Roch 'n' Horse
- 2021 - Nature Strip
- 2020 - Bivouac
- 2019 - Nature Strip
- 2018 - Santa Ana Lane
- 2017 - Redzel
- 2016 - Malaguerra
- 2015 - Delectation
- 2014 - Terravista
- 2013 - Buffering
- 2012 - Mental
- 2011 - Black Caviar
- 2010 - Black Caviar
- 2009 - All Silent
- 2008 - Swick
- 2007 - Miss Andretti
- 2006 - Dance Hero
- 2005 - Glamour Puss
- 2004 - Takeover Target
- 2003 - Ancient Song
- 2002 - Rubitano
- 2001 - Sudurka
- 2000 - Easy Rocking
- 1999 - Pharein
- 1998 - Flavour
- 1997 - Notoire
- 1996 - Gold Ace
- 1995 - Brawny Spirit
- 1994 - Hareeba
- 1993 - Alishan
- 1992 - Unspoken Word
- 1991 - Final Card
- 1990 - Planet Ruler
- 1989 - Planet Ruler
- 1988 - Special
- 1987 - Sky Filou
- 1986 - Taj Quillo
- 1985 - Lord Ballina
- 1984 - River Rough
- 1983 - River Rough
- 1982 - Forgone Conclusion
- 1981 - Zegna
- 1980 - Watney
- 1979 - Rooney
- 1978 - Always Welcome
- 1977 - Galway Bay
- 1976 - Maybe Mahal
- 1975 - Miss Lockleys
- 1974 - Scamanda
- 1973 - Century
- 1972 - Beaches
- 1971 - Welsh Prince
- 1970 - Dual Choice
- 1969 - Vain
- 1968 - Snub
- 1967 - Iga Ninja
- 1966 - Marmion
- 1965 - Picca
- 1964 - Star Of Heaven
- 1963 - Ripa
- 1962 - Samson
- 1961 - Bengal Tiger
- 1960 - Karina

== See also ==
- Champions Mile (VRC)
- Champions Stakes
- Matriarch Stakes (VRC)
- Queen Elizabeth Stakes
- List of Australian Group races
- Group races
