= The Shorts (ATC) =

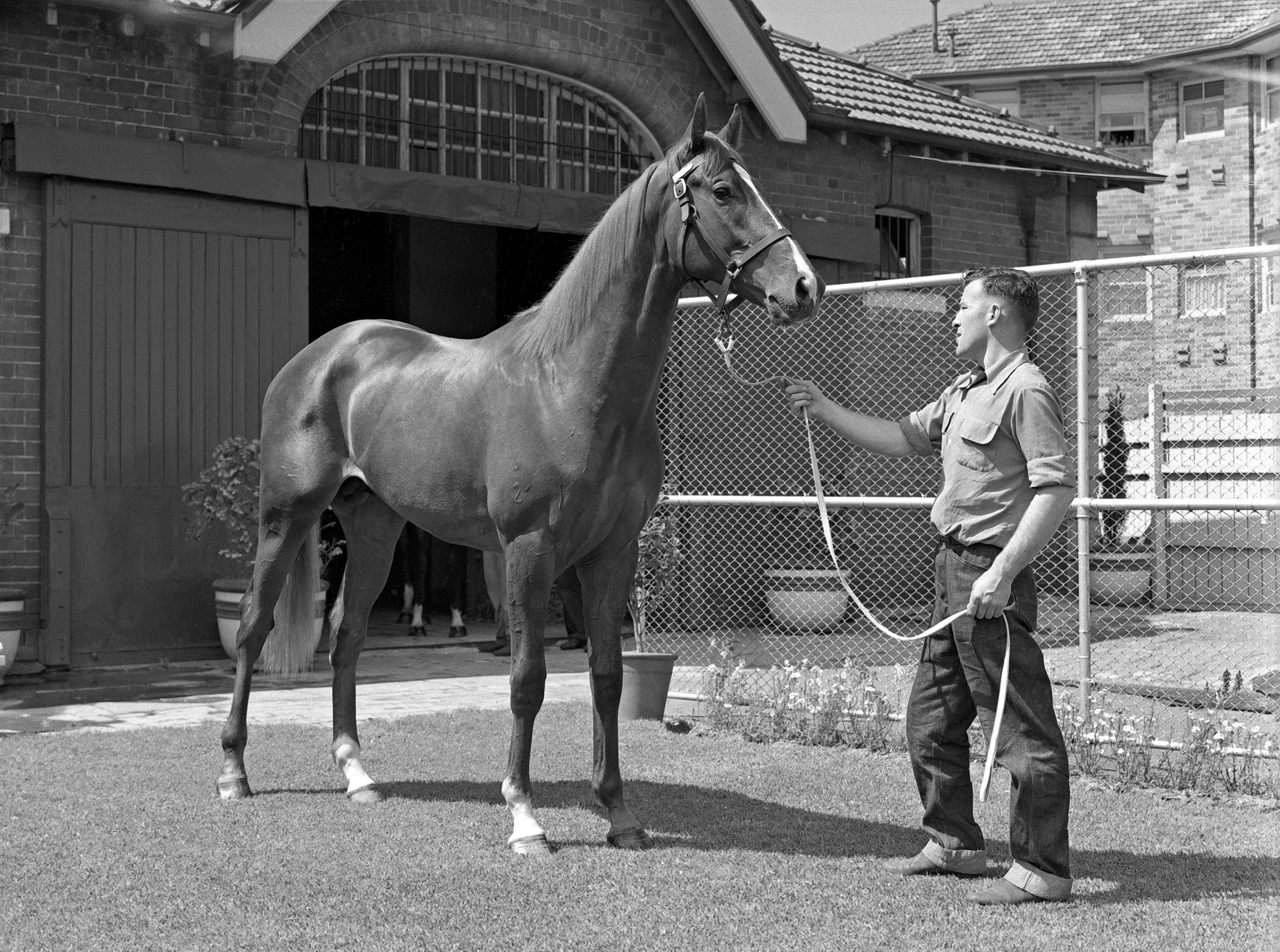
- Aboukir, 1956 winner
- Class: Group 2
- Location: Randwick Racecourse, Sydney, Australia
- Inaugurated: 1867
- Race type: Thoroughbred - flat
- Sponsor: Yarraman Park (2024-2026)

Race information
- Distance: 1,100 metres
- Surface: Turf
- Track: Right-handed
- Qualification: Horses three years old and older
- Weight: Set weights with penalties
- Purse: A$1,000,000 (2026)

The Shorts is an Australian Turf Club Group 2 Thoroughbred horse race for horses three years old and older, at set weights with penalties, over a distance of 1100 metres. It is held annually at Randwick Racecourse, Sydney, Australia in September.

== History ==
=== 1942 racebook ===
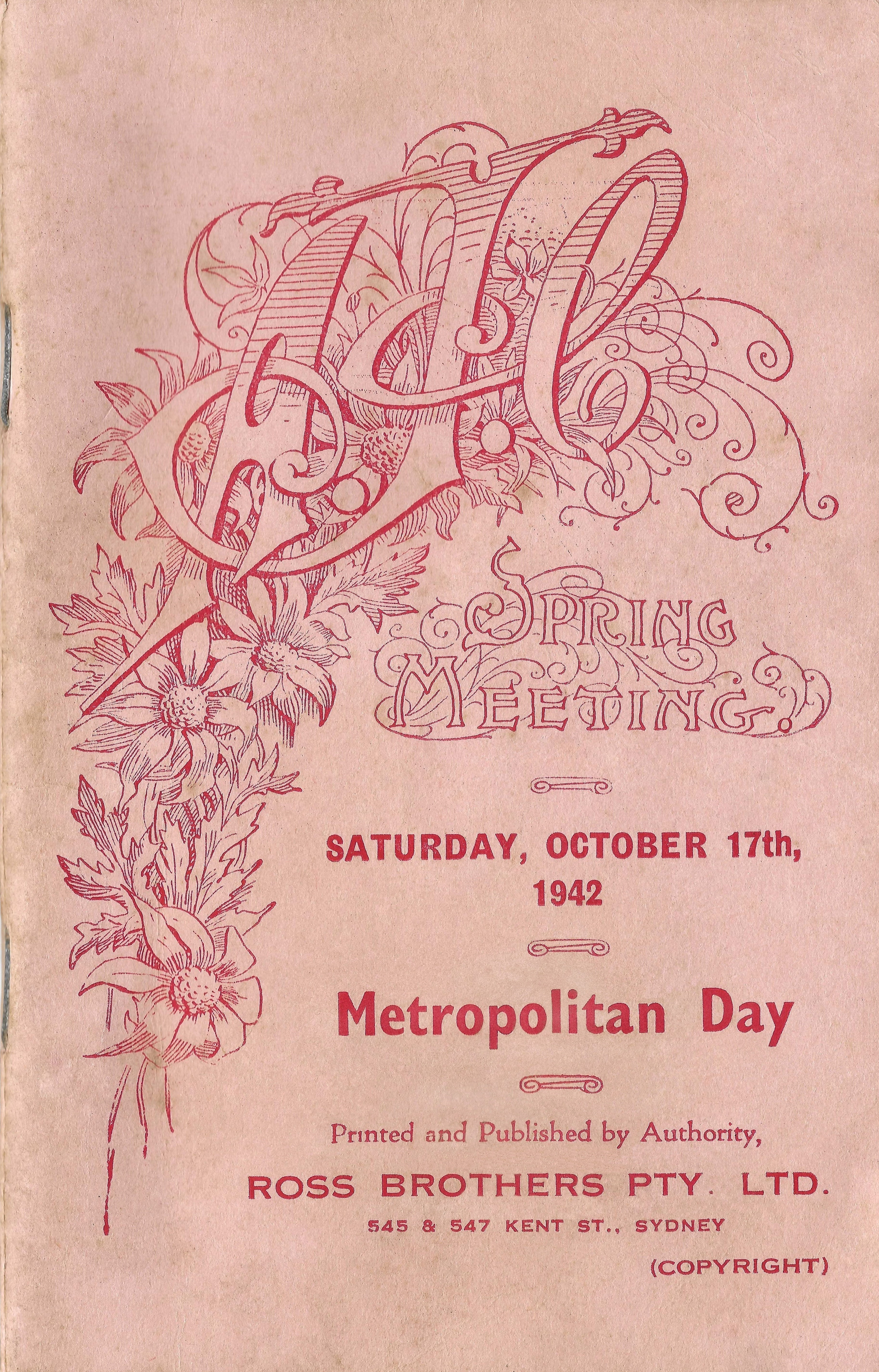
1942 AJC The Shorts racebook front cover

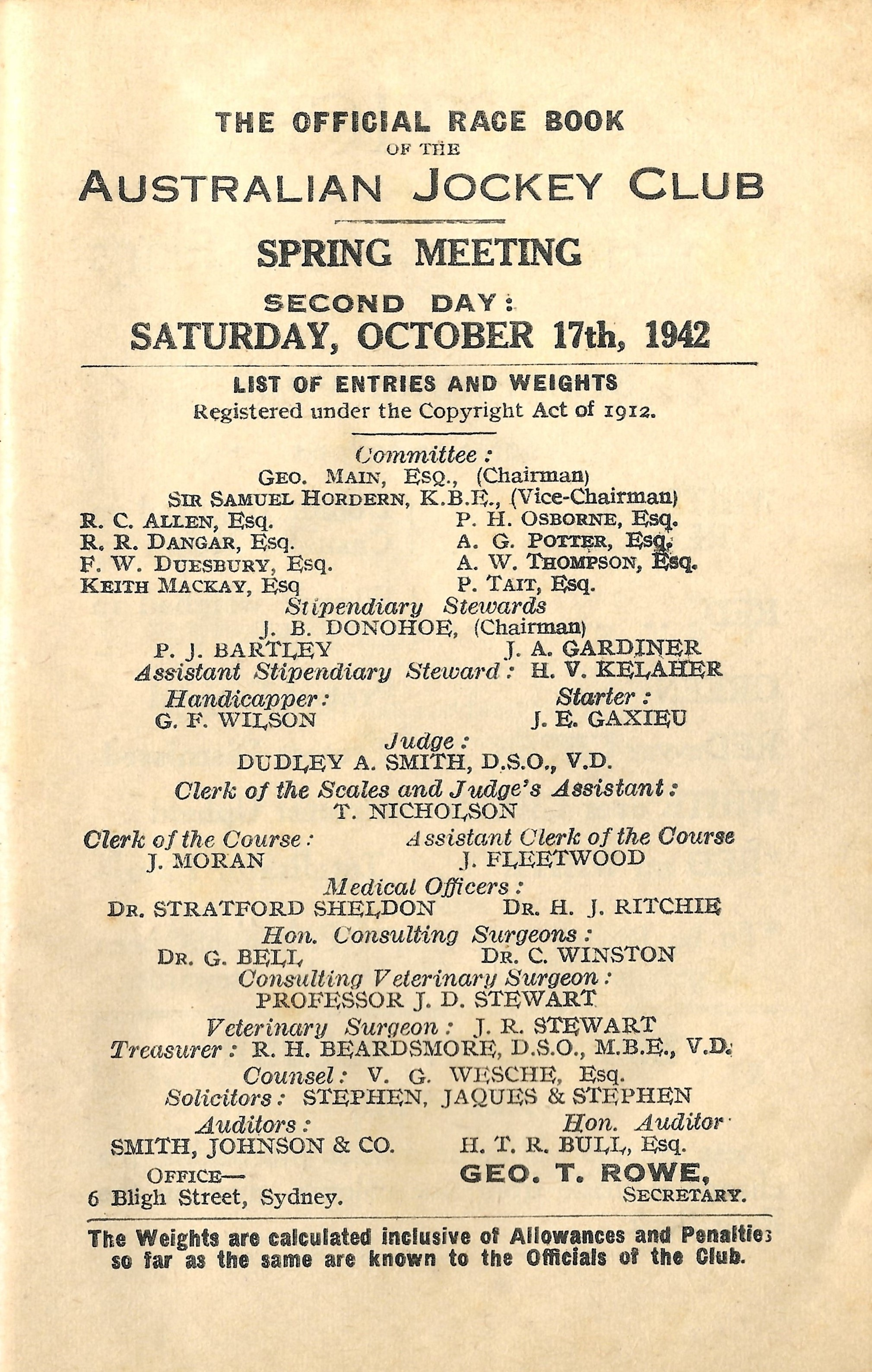
1942 AJC The Shorts showing raceday officials

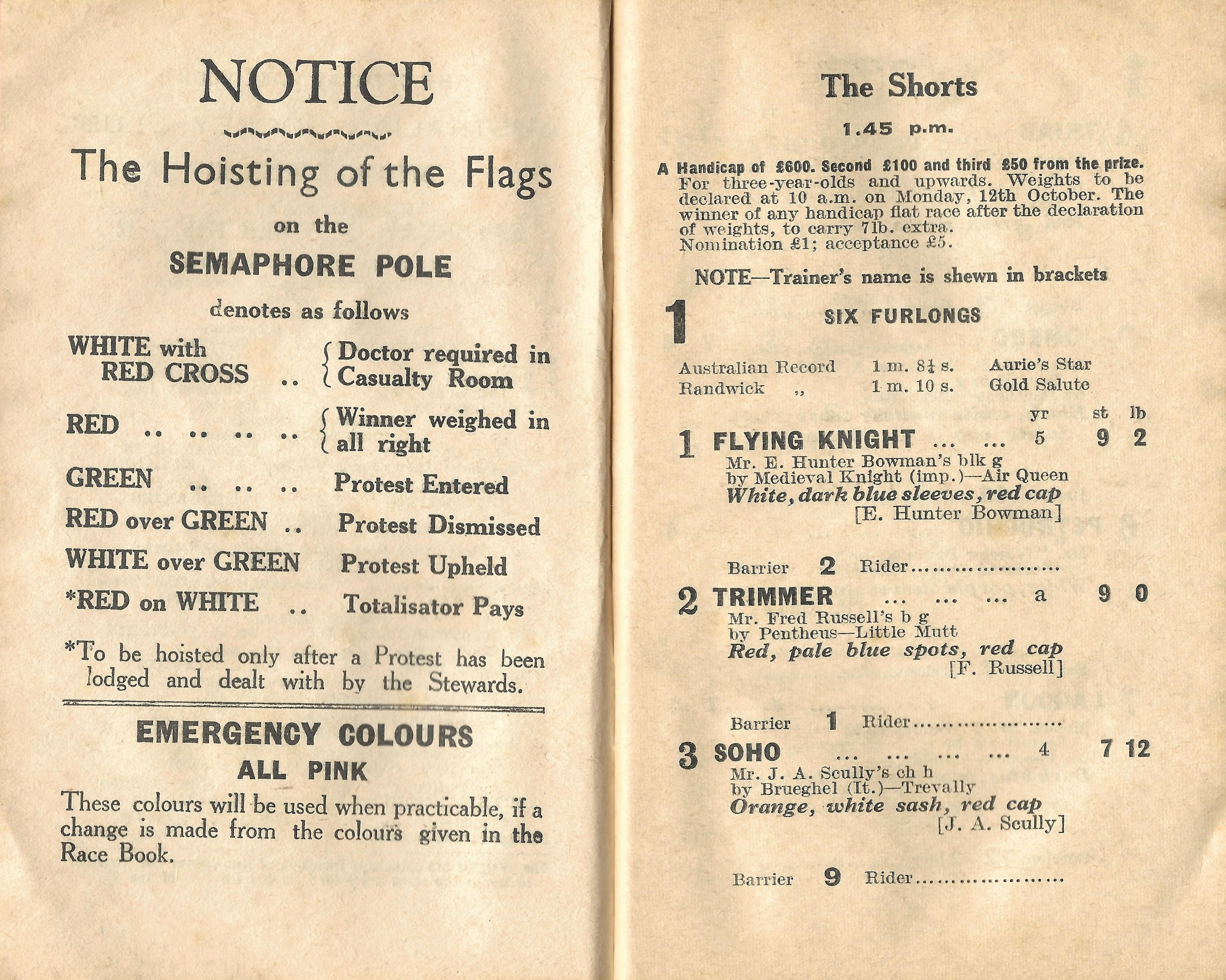
1942 AJC The Shorts starters and results showing the winner, Soho

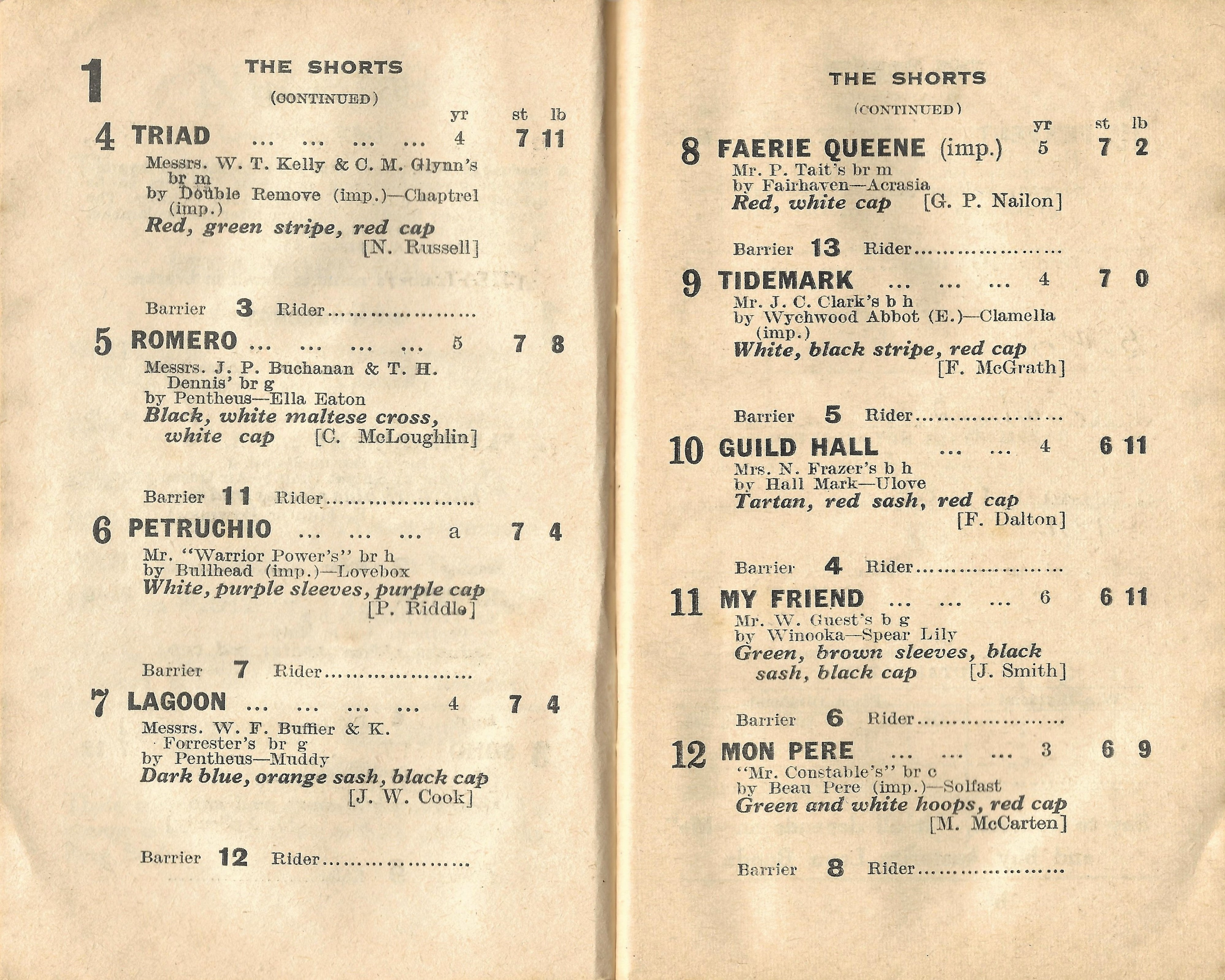
1942 AJC The Shorts starters and results

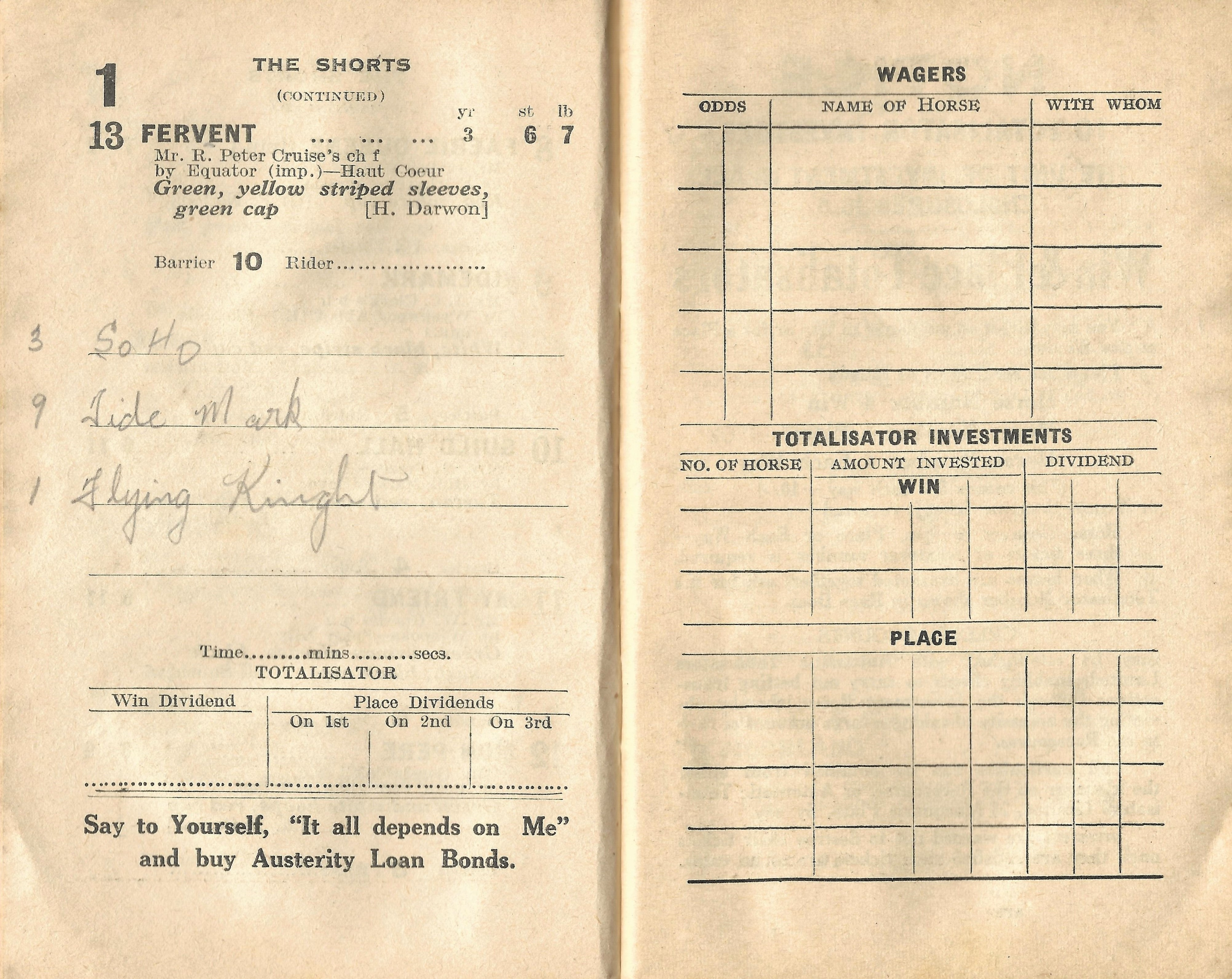
1942 AJC The Shorts starters and results

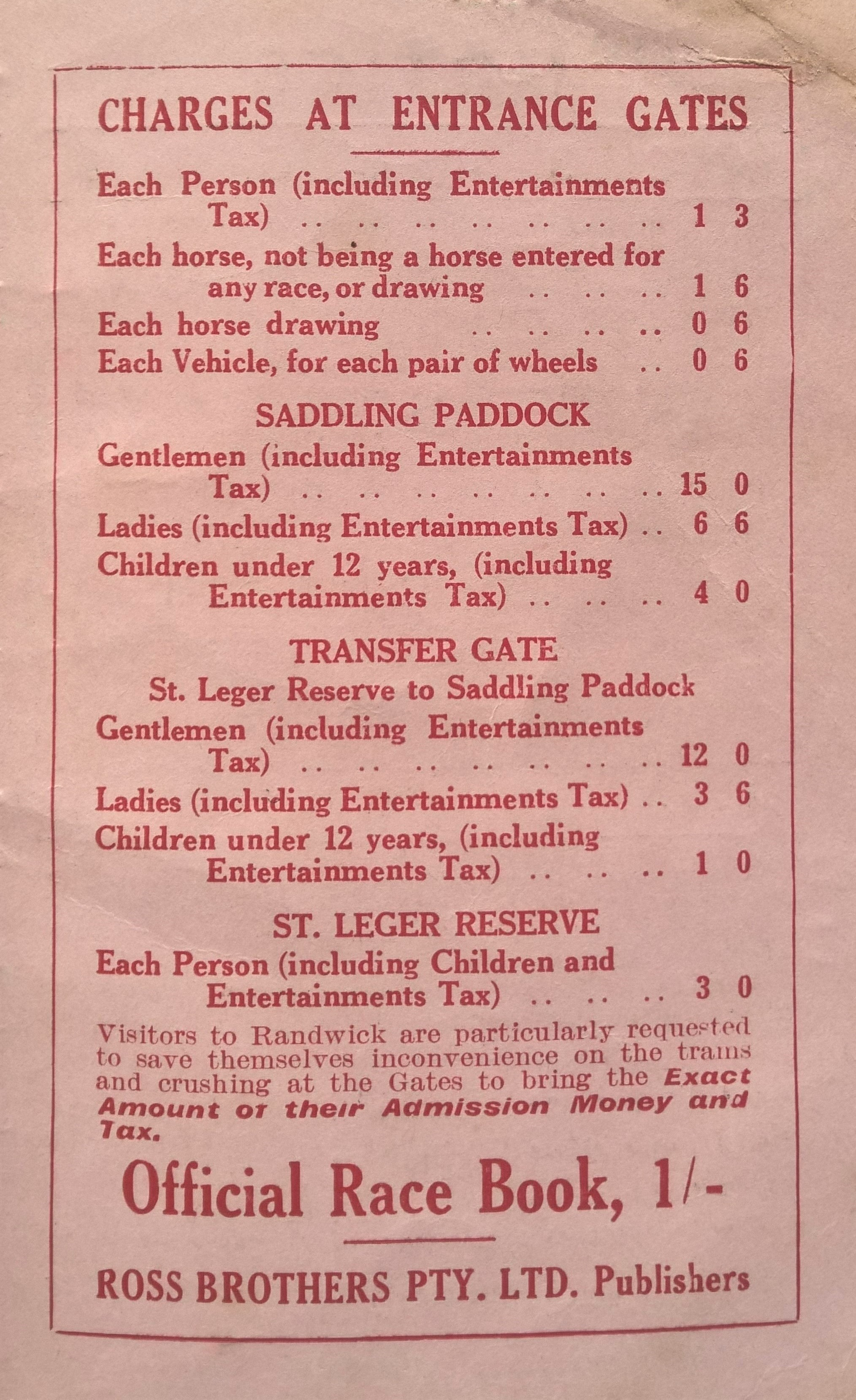
Inside cover charges at the entrance gates

=== Distance ===
- 1867–1971 - 6 furlongs
- 1972–2009 – 1100 metres
- 2010–2011 – 1200 metres
- 2012 onwards - 1100 metres

=== Venue ===
- Prior 2011 - Randwick Racecourse
- 2011 - Rosehill Gardens Racecourse
- 2012 onwards - Randwick Racecourse

=== Grade ===
- 1867–1978 - Principal Race
- 1979–1993 - Listed Race
- 1994–2006 - Group 3
- 2008 onwards - Group 2

== Winners ==
The following are past winners of the race.

- 2026 - Mazu
- 2025 - Joliestar
- 2024 - I Am Me
- 2023 - Private Eye
- 2022 - Nature Strip
- 2021 - Eduardo
- 2020 - Classique Legend
- 2019 - Pierata
- 2018 - Ball Of Muscle
- 2017 - Redzel
- 2016 - Takedown
- 2015 - Rebel Dane
- 2014 - Terravista
- 2013 - Sessions
- 2012 - Pampelonne
- 2011 - Love Conquers All
- 2010 - Hot Danish
- 2009 - Gold Trail
- 2008 - Fritz's Princess
- 2007 - †race not held
- 2006 - Bentley Biscuit
- 2005 - Black Ink
- 2004 - Dance The Waves
- 2003 - Lucky Night
- 2002 - Empire
- 2001 - Oamaru Force
- 2000 - Bradshaw
- 1999 - Ab Initio
- 1998 - Mulugwa
- 1997 - Hot As Hell
- 1996 - Madison Point
- 1995 - Moss Rocket
- 1994 - Legal Agent
- 1993 - Chiliad
- 1992 - Classic Magic
- 1991 - Euclase
- 1990 - Rise 'N' Shine
- 1989 - Rigoletto
- 1988 - Potter Mcqueen
- 1987 - Mother Duck
- 1986 - Blazing Keel
- 1985 - Bemboka Spirit
- 1984 - Spritely Knight
- 1983 - Loch Ard
- 1982 - Marquee Star
- 1981 - Trench Digger
- 1980 - Hit It Benny
- 1979 - Biscawong
- 1978 - Tangfu
- 1977 - King's Favourite
- 1976 - King's Favourite
- 1975 - Purple Patch
- 1974 - Scarlet Man
- 1973 - Starplus
- 1972 - Kista
- 1971 - Welsh Prince
- 1970 - King Bogan
- 1969 - Grey Court
- 1968 - Somebody
- 1967 - Betelgeuse
- 1966 - Redcap
- 1965 - Levitator
- 1964 - Ferguson
- 1963 - Port Fair
- 1962 - Rush Bye
- 1961 - Tipperary Star
- 1960 - Merry Polly
- 1959 - Winchester
- 1958 - Cornelius
- 1957 - Reign
- 1956 - Aboukir
- 1955 - Lindbergh
- 1954 - Nagpuni
- 1953 - Nagpuni
- 1952 - Burncourt
- 1951 - Free Rule
- 1950 - Warrah King
- 1949 - Phalanx
- 1948 - Comedy Prince
- 1947 - Native Son
- 1946 - Chaperone
- 1945 - Warlock
- 1944 - Winnipeg
- 1943 - Marcondis
- 1942 - Soho
- 1941 - Winnipeg
- 1940 - Gold Salute
- 1939 - The Albatross
- 1938 - Thurles Lad
- 1937 - Beechwood
- 1936 - Some Boy
- 1935 - The Marne
- 1934 - Australia Fair
- 1933 - Golden Gate
- 1932 - Lightning March
- 1931 - High Disdain
- 1930 - Panola
- 1929 - Figure
- 1928 - Greenline
- 1927 - Calmest
- 1926 - Calmest
- 1925 - Bairn
- 1924 - Woodville
- 1923 - Duke Isinglass
- 1922 - Vodka
- 1921 - Greenstead
- 1920 - Elkin
- 1919 - Greenstead
- 1918 - Wolaroi
- 1917 - Mérimée
- 1916 - Colugo
- 1915 - Gigandra
- 1914 - Gigandra
- 1913 - Golden Hop
- 1912 - Gigandra
- 1911 - Hot Air
- 1910 - Maori King
- 1909 - Plush
- 1908 - Soultline
- 1907 - Mimer
- 1906 - Berthier
- 1905 - Machine Gun
- 1904 - Port Jackson
- 1903 - Ceres
- 1902 - Milos
- 1901 - Gameboy
- 1900 - Myosotis
- 1899 - Sequence
- 1898 - Johansen
- 1897 - Vivian
- 1896 - Old Clo
- 1895 - Waterfall
- 1894 - Wakawatea
- 1893 - Moorefield
- 1892 - Victor Hugo
- 1891 - Alexander
- 1890 - Alchemist
- 1889 - May Queen
- 1888 - Tilburn
- 1887 - The Felon
- 1886 - My Lord
- 1885 - Wanda
- 1884 - Brian O'Lynn
- 1883 - Blue And White
- 1882 - Twilight
- 1881 - Surrey
- 1880 - Chesterfield
- 1879 - Chorister
- 1878 - The Judge
- 1877 - Ino
- 1876 - Eros
- 1875 - Express
- 1874 - Sweetbriar
- 1873 - Rosalie
- 1872 - Wombo
- 1871 - The Count
- 1870 - Deceptive
- 1869 - Lucy
- 1868 - Tippler
- 1867 - Gunilda

† Not held because of outbreak of equine influenza

== See also ==
- Bill Ritchie Handicap
- Kingston Town Stakes
- Tea Rose Stakes
- List of Australian Group races
- Group races
