= The Everest =

- Logo in use since 2017
- Class: Group 1
- Location: Randwick Racecourse, Sydney, Australia
- Inaugurated: 2017
- Race type: Thoroughbred flat
- Sponsor: TAB (2026)
- Website: www.theeverest.com.au

Race information
- Distance: 1,200 metres
- Surface: Turf
- Track: Right-handed
- Qualification: $700,000 entry fee (2023)
- Weight: Weight for Age
- Purse: $20 million (2026)

The Everest is an Australian Turf Club Group 1 Weight for Age Thoroughbred horse race run over 1,200 metres on turf at Randwick Racecourse in Sydney, Australia. Between 2017 and 2023 the race was classified as Special Conditions class. In 2024 the race was elevated to Group 1 status.

Prize money was increased in 2018 to $15 million, and in 2023 to $20 million. It is the richest race in Australia and the richest turf race in the world, held annually in October as the feature race of the Sydney Spring Carnival.

The race has an unusual entry fee structure, similar to that of the Pegasus World Cup. Twelve "slots" are sold for $700,000 each, which represents a slot in the starting gate for a then unspecified horse. The slot holder then has the right to race, lease, contract or share a starter, or sell their place in the gate. For example, in the 2017 running, slotholder James Harron struck a deal with the owners of Redzel to use his spot to enter their horse, who went on to win the race.

Prior to the 2018 event, the race attracted criticism from the Australian public and media after organisers of the event successfully lobbied for the sails of the Sydney Opera House to be used as an advertisement for the race. Protests against this proposal and government support of it were held at the Opera House along with submission of a petition with over 300,000 signatures collected in less than a week in October 2018; however the pre-race event still went ahead in a modified format.

In October 2022, the barrier draw was released to the public with a night time display over Sydney Harbour using 501 drones and the race attracted 46,221 patrons.

== Results ==
The following are the winners and placegetters of the race.

Year	Winner	Age	Gender	Jockey	Trainer(s)	Owner(s)	Slot Owner(s)	Time	2nd	3rd	Ref.
2017	Redzel	5	Gelding	Kerrin McEvoy	Peter & Paul Snowden	Triple Crown syndicate	James Harron	1:08.36	Vega Magic	Brave Smash	
2018	Redzel	6	Gelding	Kerrin McEvoy	Peter & Paul Snowden	Triple Crown syndicate	Yulong Investments	1:12.03	Trapeze Artist	Osborne Bulls	
2019	Yes Yes Yes	3	Colt	Glen Boss	Chris Waller	Coolmore Stud et al	Chris Waller Racing	1:07.32	Santa Ana Lane	Trekking	
2020	Classique Legend	5	Gelding	Kerrin McEvoy	Les Bridge	Bon Ho	Bon Ho	1:08.27	Bivouac	Gytrash	
2021	Nature Strip	7	Gelding	James McDonald	Chris Waller	RAE Lyons et al.	Chris Waller Racing	1:09.11	Masked Crusader	Eduardo	
2022	Giga Kick	3	Gelding	Craig Williams	Clayton Douglas	Jonathan Munz	James Harron	1:09.86	Private Eye	Mazu	
2023	Think About It	5	Gelding	Sam Clipperton	Joseph Pride	Proven Thoroughbreds et al.	Newgate & GPI Racing	1:07.64	I Wish I Win	Private Eye	
2024	Bella Nipotina	7	Mare	Craig Williams	Ciaron Maher	M Christian et al.	TAB	1:08.76	Giga Kick	Growing Empire	
2025	Ka Ying Rising	5	Gelding	Zac Purton	David A. Hayes	Ka Ying Syndicate	Hong Kong Jockey Club	1:08.13	Tempted	Jimmysstar	
2026	Tempted	4	Filly	Chad Schofield	Ciaron Maher	Godolphin	Godolphin	1:08.21	Ka Ying Rising	Joliestar	

== See also ==
Trophy of the Everest, shown on Sha Tin Racecourse on November 15, 2025 after awarded to Ka Ying Rising

- Everest 2025
- Golden Eagle

Held at the same meeting:

- Angst Stakes
- King Charles III Stakes
- The Kosciuszko
- Reginald Allen Quality
- St Leger Stakes
- Sydney Stakes

Races held on the same day at Caulfield:

- Caulfield Cup
- Ethereal Stakes
- Tristarc Stakes
