= Glenlogan Park Stakes =

Pam O'Neill Stakes registered as the Glenlogan Park Stakes
- Class: Group 3
- Location: Eagle Farm Racecourse; Brisbane, Australia
- Inaugurated: 1985 (as Rosemount Wines Stakes)
- Race type: Thoroughbred - Flat racing
- Sponsor: Magic Millions (2021-2026)

Race information
- Distance: 1,600 metres
- Surface: Turf
- Track: Right-handed
- Qualification: Fillies and mares
- Weight: Set weights with penalties
- Purse: A$200,000 (2026)

This race which has the registered name Glenlogan Park Stakes, but recently known as the Pam O'Neill Stakes and Magic Millions Fillies & Mares Mile, is a Brisbane Racing Club Group 3 Thoroughbred horse race for fillies and mares, run under Set Weights with penalties conditions over a distance of 1600 metres at Eagle Farm Racecourse, Brisbane, Australia during the Queensland Winter Racing Carnival.

== History ==
The race was inaugurated in 1985 as the Rosemount Wines Stakes. Since its first running the race has had many name changes.

In 2021 to 2023 the race was named after Pam O'Neill, who in 1979 became the first female rider to be registered in Australia. In 2022 she was awarded the Medal of the Order of Australia.

Ortensia won this race in 2009 before pursuing successful overseas campaigns in Dubai and in England.

=== Name ===
- 1985–1986 - Rosemount Wines Stakes
- 1987–1988 - Orlando Wines Stakes
- 1989 - Minister for Transport Stakes
- 1990 - QBBS Breeders' Stakes
- 1991 - QBBS Stakes
- 1992 - Michaels Restaurant Stakes
- 1993–1995 - The Original Tastee Pies Stakes
- 1996–1998 - Diamond Stud Stakes
- 1999–2000 - Glenlogan Park Stakes
- 2001 - Lady Of The Turf Stakes
- 2002–2018 - Glenlogan Park Stakes
- 2019 - Grinders Coffee Roasters Stakes
- 2020 - Sapphire Stakes
- 2021–2023 - Pam O'Neill Stakes
- 2024 - Drinkwise Mile
- 2025 onwards - Magic Millions Fillies & Mares Mile

=== Grade ===
- 1985–2009 - Listed Race
- 2010 onwards - Group 3

=== Conditions ===
- prior 2005 - Handicap
- 2005–2006 - Quality handicap
- 2007 onwards - Set weights with penalties

=== Distance ===
- prior to 2017 – 1350 metres
- 2017 – 1300 metres
- 2018 – 1350 metres
- 2019 – 1300 metres
- 2020 - 1630 metres
- 2021 onwards - 1600 metres

=== Other venues ===
- 2017 - Eagle Farm Racecourse
- 2019 - Eagle Farm Racecourse

== Winners ==
The following are past winners of the race.

- 2026 - Pinito
- 2025 - Pulchritudinous
- 2024 - Maracana
- 2023 - Frumos
- 2022 - Tycoon Evie
- 2021 - Nudge
- 2020 - Sure Knee
- 2019 - Savatiano
- 2018 - Pedrena
- 2017 - Eckstein
- 2016 - Ghisoni
- 2015 - Peace Force
- 2014 - Srikandi
- 2013 - Sookie
- 2012 - Wealth Princess
- 2011 - Kanzan
- 2010 - Wealth Princess
- 2009 - Ortensia
- 2008 - Quizzical Lady
- 2007 - Storm Signal
- 2006 - Countess Bathory
- 2005 - Beautiful Gem
- 2004 - Martique
- 2003 - Suzy Grey
- 2002 - Paris Heartbeat
- 2001 - Classic Cliche
- 2000 - Stella Maree
- 1999 - Chiming Lass
- 1998 - Razor Blade
- 1997 - Timeless Winds
- 1996 - Amber
- 1995 - Mamzelle Pedrille
- 1994 - Seawinne
- 1993 - Rich Pageantry
- 1992 - Blushing Bijou
- 1991 - Morning Lover
- 1990 - Our Today
- 1989 - La Posette
- 1988 - Marmie's Girl
- 1987 - Call Me Biddy
- 1986 - Dame Du Siecle
- 1985 - Princess Tiber

‡ Not held due to the COVID-19 pandemic

== See also ==
- BRC Sprint
- Doomben Cup
- Doomben Roses
- List of Australian Group races
- Group races
