= Victory Stakes =

- Class: Group 2
- Location: Eagle Farm Racecourse, Brisbane, Australia
- Inaugurated: 1980
- Race type: Thoroughbred - Flat racing
- Sponsor: Ladbrokes (2026)

Race information
- Distance: 1,200 metres
- Surface: Turf
- Track: Right-handed
- Qualification: Three year old and older
- Weight: Weight for Age
- Purse: A$300,000 (2026)
- Bonuses: Winner ballot exemption from the Stradbroke Handicap

The Victory Stakes is a Brisbane Racing Club Group 2 Weight for Age Thoroughbred horse race, for horses aged three years old and upwards, over a distance of 1200 metres at Eagle Farm Racecourse, during the Queensland Winter Racing Carnival.

== History ==
The original race was named in honour of Sir Byrne Hart (1895–1989), who was a soldier, accountant, company director and served as chairman of the Queensland Turf Club (1966-74).

=== Name ===
- 1980–1982 - Sir Byrne Hart Handicap
- 1983 - The XXXX
- 1984 - The XXXX Quality Hcp
- 1985 - Crest International Cup
- 1986 - Mayfair-Crest International Cup
- 1987–1988 - Sir Byrne Hart Quality Handicap
- 1989–2009 - Sir Byrne Hart Stakes
- 2010 onwards - Victory Stakes

=== Distance ===
- 1980–1982 – 1810 metres
- 1983 – 1866 metres
- 1984–1985 – 2100 metres
- 1986–1987 – 2125 metres
- 1988 – 1830 metres
- 1989–2005 – 1400 metres
- 2006 onwards - 1200 metres

=== Grade ===
- 1980 - Listed Race
- 1981–1991 - Group 3
- 1992 onwards - Group 2

=== Other venues ===
- 2013 - Doomben Racecourse
- 2015 - Gold Coast Racecourse
- 2016 - Doomben Racecourse
- 2018 - Doomben Racecourse

=== Multiple recent winners ===
Trainers

- Robert Heathcote in 2011, 2013 and 2023.
- Tony Gollan in 2014 and 2024
- Mick Mair in 2008 and 2009.

Jockeys

- Damian Browne in 2013, 2015 and 2018
- Ken Pope in 2008 and 2009

== Past winners ==
The following are past winners of the race.

- 2026 - Splash Back
- 2025 - Libertad
- 2024 - Antino
- 2023 - Rothfire
- 2022 - Count De Rupee
- 2021 - Niccanova
- 2020 - Victorem
- 2019 - I Am Excited
- 2018 - Impending
- 2017 - Music Magnate
- 2016 - Fell Swoop
- 2015 - Srikandi
- 2014 - Temple Of Boom
- 2013 - Buffering
- 2012 - Meeting abandoned
- 2011 - Buffering
- 2010 - Ghetto Blaster
- 2009 - Swiss Ace
- 2008 - Swiss Ace
- 2007 - Mitanni
- 2006 - All Bar One
- 2005 - Wager
- 2004 - Only Words
- 2003 - Tit For Taat
- 2002 - Mr Bureaucrat
- 2001 - Make Mine Magic
- 2000 - Cheiron
- 1999 - Roulette
- 1998 - Summer Beau
- 1997 - Quick Flick
- 1996 - Meeting abandoned
- 1995 - Pride Of Rancho
- 1994 - Lets Hurry
- 1993 - Chortle
- 1992 - Majestic Boy
- 1991 - Rough Habit
- 1990 - Noble Clubs
- 1989 - Groucho
- 1988 - Finezza Belle
- 1987 - Joindre
- 1986 - Handy Proverb
- 1985 - Noble Lad
- 1984 - Roipeka
- 1983 - Home Maid
- 1982 - Coe
- 1981 - Private Thoughts
- 1980 - Golden Rhapsody

== See also ==
- Queensland Guineas
- List of Australian Group races
- Group races
