= Moreton Cup =

- Class: Group 2
- Location: Eagle Farm Racecourse; Brisbane, Australia
- Inaugurated: 1979 (as Katies Cup)
- Race type: Thoroughbred - Flat racing
- Sponsor: Ladbrokes (2026)

Race information
- Distance: 1,200 metres
- Surface: Turf
- Track: Right-handed
- Weight: Quality Handicap
- Purse: A$300,000 (2026)
- Bonuses: Exempt from ballot in Stradbroke Handicap and Tattersall's Tiara

The Moreton Cup is a Brisbane Racing Club Group 2 Australian Thoroughbred horse race held under open handicap conditions, over a distance of 1200 metres at Eagle Farm Racecourse in Brisbane, Australia during the Queensland Winter Racing Carnival.

== History ==
The inaugural running of the race was in 1979 as the Katies Cup

=== Name ===
- 1979–1982 - Katies Cup
- 1983 - Westfield Cup
- 1984–1990 - Ansett Cup
- 1991 - Ansett Australia Cup
- 1992 - QTC Cup
- 1993–1995 - Qantas Cup
- 1996–2016 - QTC Cup
- 2017 onwards - Moreton Cup

=== Grade ===
- 1979–1983 - Group 3
- 1984 onwards - Group 2 race

=== Distance ===
- 1979–2005 – 1200 metres
- 2006–2014 – 1300 metres
- 2015 – 1200 metres
- 2016 – 1300 metres
- 2017 onwards – 1200 metres

=== Other venues ===
Due to track reconstruction of Eagle Farm Racecourse for the 2014–15 racing season the event was transferred to Doomben Racecourse. The event was moved in 2018 to the Sunshine Coast.

- 2015, 2017, 2019 - Doomben Racecourse
- 2018 - Corbould Park Racecourse

== Winners ==
The following are past winners of the race.

- 2026 - Uncommon James
- 2025 - Front Page
- 2024 - Vilana
- 2023 - Prince Of Boom
- 2022 - Baller
- 2021 - Baller
- 2020 - ‡race not held
- 2019 - Pretty In Pink
- 2018 - The Monstar
- 2017 - Deploy
- 2016 - Spill The Beans
- 2015 - Ball Of Muscle
- 2014 - Sacred Star
- 2013 - Galah
- 2012 - Celtic Dancer
- 2011 - Varrena Miss
- 2010 - Catapulted
- 2009 - Ortensia
- 2008 - Chinchilla Rose
- 2007 - Nova Star
- 2006 - Messiaen
- 2005 - Sir Breakfast
- 2004 - Falkirk
- 2003 - Into The Night
- 2002 - Pembleton
- 2001 - Century Kid
- 2000 - Gallopini
- 1999 - race not held
- 1998 - Scandinavia
- 1997 - Celestial Choir
- 1996 - Hareeba
- 1995 - Bulldog Yeats
- 1994 - Bellzevir
- 1993 - Overpitch
- 1992 - Schillaci
- 1991 - Heavenly Knight
- 1990 - Rechabite
- 1989 - Vitalic
- 1988 - race not held
- 1987 - Tolai
- 1986 - Eye Of The Sky
- 1985 - Pete's Choice
- 1984 - Manuan
- 1983 - Nosey Parker
- 1982 - My Gold Hope
- 1981 - Tulip Town
- 1980 - Winter's Dance
- 1979 - Famoso Gris

‡ Not held because of the COVID-19 pandemic

== See also ==
- Kingsford-Smith Cup
- Queensland Derby
- Queensland Oaks
- Stradbroke Handicap
- Tattersall's Tiara
- List of Australian Group races
- Group races
