= Pam O'Neill =

Australian former jockey

Pam O'Neill OAM
- Born: 1944 or 1945 (age 81–82); Brisbane, Queensland, Australia
- Occupations: horse racing administrator, former jockey

Pam O'Neill is an Australian former jockey.

O'Neill is best known for being the first registered Australian female jockey, permitted to compete professionally against male jockeys after being granted a licence by the Queensland Turf Club on 16 May 1979.

== Career ==
=== Early career ===
O'Neill spent 14 years of petitioning the jockey board in Australia to allow female jockeys to compete against men, during which time she wrote more than 140 letters to racing administrators in Queensland.

Considered a pioneer, O'Neill's campaign is credited with ensuring women were allowed to become more involved with the sport, initially as registered stablehands and then trackwork riders.

On 29 February 1974, O'Neill rode Rene's Magic to victory in the Scarlet Stakes at Gosford.

On 31 August 1974, O'Neill rode Ropely Lad to victory at Eagle Farm in the International Race for Women Riders.

On 29 March 1975, O'Neill rode Burgundy to victory in a special race for women jockeys called the Gina Lollobrigida Sprint which was held by the Rockhampton Jockey Club in honour of visiting Hollywood actress Gina Lollobrigida.

=== Professional career ===
Prior to O'Neill becoming the first registered licensed jockey in Australia, New Zealand jockey Linda Jones claimed the honour of being the first jockey in Australia to compete against male jockeys after she was granted an allowance. O'Neill described the decision to allow Jones to ride in Australia as bittersweet but said it ultimately helped Australian women to argue their case of female jockeys being allowed to compete in Australia.

On 16 May 1979, O'Neill was finally granted her a country jockey's licence by the Queensland Turf Club, which permitted her to compete against male jockeys in any racetrack outside the metropolitan racecourses of Eagle Farm, Doomben and Albion Park.

Four days after becoming a registered jockey, O'Neill competed in a race day at Southport on 19 May 1979, where she rode three winners on debut which was a world record.

After her licence was upgraded to allow her to compete in Brisbane metropolitan race meetings, O'Neill became the first Australian women to win a metropolitan race against male riders, riding Samei Boy to victory in the $10,000 Booroolong Handicap at Doomben on 23 June 1979.

However, four days after her win in the Booroolong Handicap, O'Neill was suspended for two weeks for careless riding after stewards alleged she had caused interference to two horses in a race at Bundamba by allowing her horse to crowd two others.

In January 1980, O'Neill beat Roy Higgins in the Unisex Handicap at Moonee Valley.

O'Neill lists becoming the first woman to win the Rockhampton Cup at Callaghan Park on her horse Supersnack in 1990 as a career highlight.

She retired from racing in 1997 at the age of 52.

After her riding career, O'Neill became an administrator within the industry. In 1997, she was appointed as the secretary of the Queensland Jockeys Association and in 2001, she became a director of the Australian Jockeys Association.

== Honours ==
O'Neill was inducted into the Queensland Racing Hall of Fame in 2010.

In 2019, she had a race at Doomben named in her honour.

In 2020, O'Neill was one of six sportspeople inducted into Queensland Sport Hall of Fame, alongside Roy Fowler, Barry Dancer, Dick Marks, Robbie McEwan and Brooke Wilkins.

As part of the 2022 Australia Day Honours, O'Neill was awarded with the Medal of the Order of Australia in recognition for her service to horse racing as a jockey. After accepting the honour, O'Neill said she would like the racing industry to do more to attract young Indigenous Australians and those living in rural areas for them to potentially follow in the footsteps of Darby McCarthy.

In 2021, the Sapphire Stakes for fillies and mares at Doomben Racecourse was renamed the Pam O'Neill Stakes in recognition of O'Neill's achievements.

== Personal life ==
O'Neill was married to jockey Colin O'Neill until his death at the age of 71 in 2012.

In 2022, O'Neill confirmed she had been diagnosed with cancer for the second time in 35 years, and was preparing to undergo radiation treatment.

== See also ==
- Michelle Payne
- Jamie Melham
