= Edward Williams (Queensland judge) =

Australian judge (1921–1999)

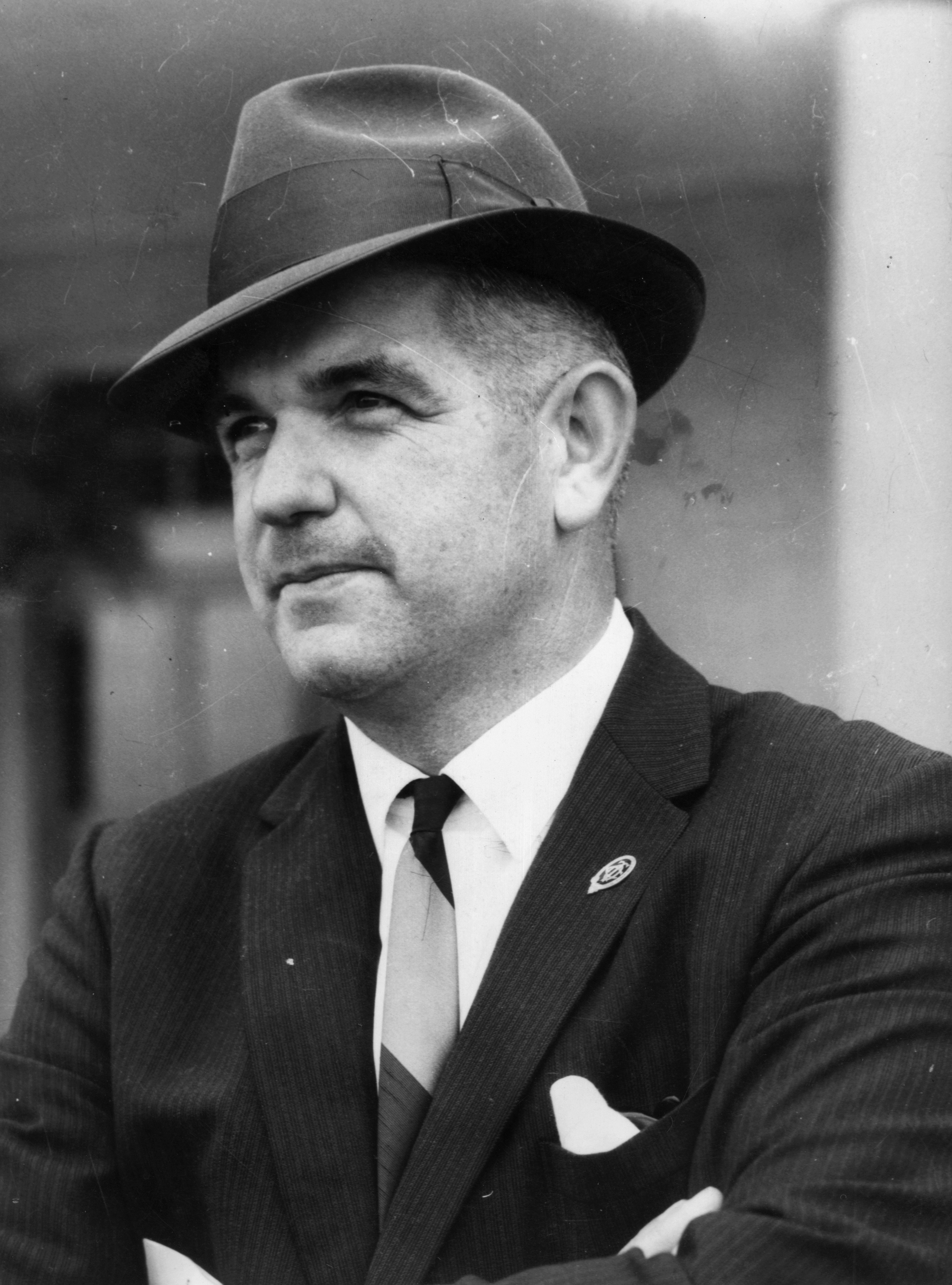
Edward Stratten Williams

Sir Edward Stratten Williams KCMG KBE QC (29 December 1921 – 10 January 1999) was a judge of the Supreme Court of Queensland.

== Early life ==
Edward Stratten Williams was born on 29 December 1921 in Yungaburra, Far North Queensland, the son of businessman Edward Stratten Williams and his wife, Zilla Claudia (née McHugh). He was orphaned at age 8 and subsequently sent to boarding school at Mt. Carmel College, Charters Towers. Williams was Dux of the College and when World War II broke out enrolled in the Light Horse. He later transferred to the RAAF and went to England to assist the Allies push eastwards over continental Europe. He was a pilot of Lancaster bombers with the Royal Air Force as a flight lieutenant in 186 Squadron, Bomber Command.

== Legal career ==
In March 1944 Williams enrolled as an external student at the University of London in the Faculty of Law. He completed his final LLB examinations in June 1946. He graduated with Second Class Honours in Law in June 1946. He was admitted as a barrister on 19 November 1946 and was appointed a Queen's Counsel on 4 March 1965.

Williams was appointed as a judge of the Supreme Court of Queensland on 13 May 1971 and served until he retired on 17 February 1984.

Williams was appointed to head the 1977 to 1980 Royal Commission Inquiry into Drugs.

Williams was the Chairman of the 1982 Brisbane Commonwealth Games Foundation for which he received the Australian of the Year award in 1982. Sir Edward was also appointed Commissioner General for Expo '88, and received the Queenslander of the Year award in 1983.

Williams had numerous other commitments, including being chairman of the Queensland Turf Club for 11 years up to 1991. The Sir Edward Williams Handicap is run on Queensland Oaks day at Eagle Farm racecourse, for his service of over 30 years to the QTC.

He was appointed Knight Commander of the Order of the British Empire (KBE) in the 1981 New Year Honours and later Knight Commander of the Most Distinguished Order of Saint Michael and Saint George (KCMG) in the 1983 New Year Honours.

== Later life ==
Williams died on 10 January 1999 and was buried in Nudgee Cemetery.

== See also ==
- Judiciary of Australia
- List of Judges of the Supreme Court of Queensland
