= Rough Habit =

New Zealand Thoroughbred racehorse

- Sire: Roughcast (USA)
- Grandsire: Noholme (AUS)
- Dam: Certain Habit (NZ)
- Damsire: Ashabit (GB)
- Sex: Gelding
- Foaled: 2 December 1986
- Died: 7 November 2014 (aged 27)
- Country: New Zealand
- Colour: Bay
- Breeder: Isabell Roddick
- Owner: Joe Battiston, David Smith, Caryl (Snow) Rackley
- Trainer: John Wheeler
- Record: 74: 29-16-7
- Earnings: A$3.89 million

Major wins
- Queensland Derby (1990); Sir Byrne Hart Stakes (1991); Southport Cup (1991, 1992); Stradbroke Handicap (1991, 1992); Doomben Cup (1991, 1992, 1993); Mudgway Stakes (1991); Captain Cook Stakes (1992); All-Aged Stakes (1992, 1993); AJC Queen Elizabeth Stakes (1992); Caulfield Stakes (1994); P.J. O'Shea Stakes (1995)

Awards
- New Zealand Horse of the Year (1992 & 1995); New Zealand Racing Hall Of Fame (2012)

Honours
- New Zealand Racing Hall of Fame; Rough Habit Plate at Doomben Racecourse
- Last updated on 3 August 2011

Rough Habit (2 December 1986 – 7 November 2014) was a New Zealand-bred Thoroughbred racehorse who won 11 Group One (G1) races on both sides of the Tasman, and won New Zealand's Horse of the Year Award in 1992 and 1995.

== Background ==
Rough Habit, a bay gelding with a distinctive white blaze trailing over his near-side nostril, was foaled on 2 December 1986. He was sired by Roughcast (USA) out of Certain Habit (NZ) by Ashabit (GB). Certain Habit was the dam of 11 named foals produced in Australia and New Zealand, producing 2 stakes winners in Rough Habit and Citi Habit.

== Racing record ==
Rough Habit was trained by John Wheeler, and had nine campaigns in Australia, from three to eight years of age. He won Group One races in Sydney and Melbourne and six of his 11 Group One races at the Brisbane winter carnivals, where his wins included the Queensland Derby, two Stradbroke Handicaps, and a record three Doomben Cups. Rough Habit won 21 feature races from 1,400 to 2,400 metres, on wet tracks and dry, and was narrowly beaten by fellow New Zealander Solvit in the 1994 Cox Plate. Later in the season, Rough Habit won the O'Shea Stakes, in Brisbane, at his final start in Australia.

== Honours ==
In retirement, Rough Habit appeared in a set of stamps issued by New Zealand Post in 1996 with fellow champion thoroughbreds Kiwi, Bonecrusher, and Horlicks, and the harness racing champions Blossom Lady and Il Vicolo.

In 2012, Rough Habit was inducted into the New Zealand Racing Hall of Fame at a special awards ceremony in Auckland.

The Brisbane Racing Club holds the Group 3 Rough Habit Plate for three-year-olds, which is run at set weights, and named in his honour.

== Death ==
Rough Habit died on 7 November 2014, aged 27.

== Pedigree ==
Pedigree of Rough Habit (NZ), 1986
| Sire Roughcast 1978 | Noholme | Star Kingdom | Stardust |
| Sire Roughcast 1978 | Noholme | Star Kingdom | Impromptu |
| Sire Roughcast 1978 | Noholme | Oceana | Understanding |
| Sire Roughcast 1978 | Noholme | Oceana | Mountain Flower |
| Sire Roughcast 1978 | Bold Empress | Bold Ruler | Nasrullah |
| Sire Roughcast 1978 | Bold Empress | Bold Ruler | Miss Disco |
| Sire Roughcast 1978 | Bold Empress | Magneto | Ambiorix |
| Sire Roughcast 1978 | Bold Empress | Magneto | Dynamo |
| Dam Certain Habit 1977 | Ashabit | Habitat | Northern Dancer |
| Dam Certain Habit 1977 | Ashabit | Habitat | Fairy Bridge |
| Dam Certain Habit 1977 | Ashabit | Asmara | Slewpy |
| Dam Certain Habit 1977 | Ashabit | Asmara | Hirondelle |
| Dam Certain Habit 1977 | Charlotte Rhodes | Lucifer | Match II |
| Dam Certain Habit 1977 | Charlotte Rhodes | Lucifer | Brandina |
| Dam Certain Habit 1977 | Charlotte Rhodes | First Fancy | Avocat General |
| Dam Certain Habit 1977 | Charlotte Rhodes | First Fancy | Preview |

== See also ==
- List of leading Thoroughbred racehorses
- Repeat winners of horse races
- Thoroughbred racing in New Zealand
