= Brazen Beau =

Australian thoroughbred racehorse

- Racing Silks of Brazen Beau
- Sire: I Am Invincible
- Grandsire: Invincible Spirit
- Dam: Sansadee
- Damsire: Snaadee
- Sex: Stallion
- Foaled: 24 September 2011
- Country: Australia
- Colour: Brown
- Breeder: BM Howlett
- Owner: Darley Stud
- Trainer: Chris Waller
- Record: 12: 5–4–0
- Earnings: AU$1,622,620

Major wins
- Champagne Classic (2014); Roman Consul Stakes (2014); Coolmore Stud Stakes (2014); Newmarket Handicap (2015)

Awards
- Australian Champion Three Year Old Colt/Gelding (2014-2015)

Brazen Beau (foaled 24 September 2011) is a retired multiple Group 1 winning Australian thoroughbred racehorse, and current successful stallion.

== Background ==
Brazen Beau was bred in Canberra by Group 1 winning jockey and trainer Bernie Howlett. Howlett won the Group 1 Sydney Cup as a jockey in 1959 aboard On Line and the 1961 Cup with Sharply. As a trainer he won the 1996 Doomben 10,000 with Suntain.

Howlett raced and owned Brazen Beau's mother Sansadee who won three races, with her best result a third placing in the 2003 Black Opal Stakes behind Handsome Ransom and Exceed And Excel.

Howlett decided to support Yarraman Park Stud's first season sire I Am Invincible and sent his mare Sansadee to the stallion. After Brazen Beau was born he was sold by Howlett for $70,000 at the 2013 Inglis Classic Yearling sale. He was purchased by Grant Morgan of Ontrack Thoroughbreds, and the colt was syndicated to a group of 38 owners from across Australia.

== Racing career ==
Brazen Beau won his first ever race at Canterbury Park Racecourse. His other win as a two year old was the Champagne Classic at Doomben. On both occasions, he was ridden by Nash Rawiller.

As a three year old, he was successful in two Group 1 races at Flemington, the Coolmore Stud Stakes and the Newmarket Handicap. In both races he was ridden by João Moreira.

Brazen Beau finished his racing career in England. He raced on two occasions, finisishing second in the Diamond Jubilee Stakes when ridden by Craig Williams and seventh in the July Cup when ridden by James Doyle at his last ever race start.

== Stud career ==
Brazen Beau was sold to Godolphin's breeding operation Darley Stud for a reported A$10 million. He undertakes shuttle stallion duties between Darley's Dalham Hall Stud in England and Northwood Park farm in Victoria, Australia.

=== Notable stock ===
Brazen Beau's Group One winners:

c = colt, f = filly, g = gelding

Foaled	Name	Sex	Major wins
2018	On The Bubbles	g	Manawatu Sires Produce Stakes
2018	Zapateo	f	The Galaxy
2021	Another Prophet	f	The Thousand Guineas

== Pedigree ==
Pedigree of Brazen Beau (AUS) 2011
Sire I Am Invincible (AUS) 2004	Invincible Spirit (IRE); 1997	Green Desert	Danzig
Sire I Am Invincible (AUS) 2004	Invincible Spirit (IRE); 1997	Green Desert	Foreign Courier
Sire I Am Invincible (AUS) 2004	Invincible Spirit (IRE); 1997	Rafha	Kris
Sire I Am Invincible (AUS) 2004	Invincible Spirit (IRE); 1997	Rafha	Eljazzi
Sire I Am Invincible (AUS) 2004	Cannarelle (AUS); 1998	Canny Lad	Bletchingly
Sire I Am Invincible (AUS) 2004	Cannarelle (AUS); 1998	Canny Lad	Jesmond Lass
Sire I Am Invincible (AUS) 2004	Cannarelle (AUS); 1998	Countess Pedrille	Zoffany
Sire I Am Invincible (AUS) 2004	Cannarelle (AUS); 1998	Countess Pedrille	Sister Pedrille
Dam Sansadee (AUS) 2000	Snaadee (USA); 1987	Danzig	Northern Dancer
Dam Sansadee (AUS) 2000	Snaadee (USA); 1987	Danzig	Pas De Nom
Dam Sansadee (AUS) 2000	Snaadee (USA); 1987	Somfas	What A Pleasure
Dam Sansadee (AUS) 2000	Snaadee (USA); 1987	Somfas	Ciboulette
Dam Sansadee (AUS) 2000	Sansapa (AUS); 1988	Bletchingly	Biscay
Dam Sansadee (AUS) 2000	Sansapa (AUS); 1988	Bletchingly	Coogee
Dam Sansadee (AUS) 2000	Sansapa (AUS); 1988	Nearctic Answer	Nearctic
Dam Sansadee (AUS) 2000	Sansapa (AUS); 1988	Nearctic Answer	Prize Answer
