= Champagne Classic (BRC) =

Horse race in Brisbane, Australia

Spirit Of Boom Classic
- Class: Group 2
- Location: Doomben Racecourse; Brisbane, Australia
- Inaugurated: 1982
- Race type: Thoroughbred - Flat racing
- Sponsor: Seven Network (2025 & 2026)

Race information
- Distance: 1,200 metres
- Surface: Turf
- Track: Right-handed
- Qualification: Two year old
- Weight: Set Weights colts and geldings – 57 kg fillies – 55 kg
- Purse: A$300,000 (2026)
- Bonuses: Winner ballot exempt from the J. J. Atkins

The Spirit Of Boom Classic, registered as the Champagne Classic, is a Brisbane Racing Club Group 2 Thoroughbred horse race for horses aged two years old, at set weights, over a distance of 1200 metres at Doomben Racecourse, Brisbane, Australia, during the Queensland Winter Racing Carnival.

== History ==
The two-year-old event is the first major race during the Brisbane winter racing carnival.

The race record was set by Gold Edition in 2006 in time of 1:09.36.

=== Name ===
- 1982–1983 - Coca-Cola Stakes
- 1984–1994 - Coca-Cola Bottlers' Classic
- 1995–1998 - Coca-Cola Classic
- 1999–2001 - Moet and Chandon Classic
- 2002–2020 - Champagne Classic
- 2021 onwards - Spirit Of Boom Classic

=== Grade ===
- 1982–1986 - Listed Race
- 1987–2005 - Group 3
- 2006 onwards - Group 2

=== Other venues ===
- 2013 - Eagle Farm Racecourse
- 2020 - Eagle Farm Racecourse
- 2022 - Eagle Farm Racecourse

=== Recent multiple winners ===
Jockeys

- Larry Cassidy (jockey) (2001, 2009 and 2015)

Trainers

- Robert Heathcote (2000, 2009, 2020 and 2021)
- Chris Waller (horse trainer) (2010, 2014, 2017 and 2018)

== Winners ==
The following are past winners of the race.

- 2026 - Vantorix
- 2025 - Cool Archie
- 2024 - Bittercreek
- 2023 - Cifrado
- 2022 - Swiss Exile
- 2021 - Prince Of Boom
- 2020 - Rothfire
- 2019 - Dubious
- 2018 - Zousain
- 2017 - Tangled
- 2016 - Winning Rupert
- 2015 - Blueberry Hill
- 2014 - Brazen Beau
- 2013 - Vo Heart
- 2012 - Sizzling
- 2011 - Free Wheeling
- 2010 - Pressday
- 2009 - Funtantes
- 2008 - Court
- 2007 - Keiki
- 2006 - Gold Edition
- 2005 - Virage de Fortune
- 2004 - Golden Fox
- 2003 - Shamekha
- 2002 - Lovely Jubly
- 2001 - Dolce Veloce
- 2000 - Chenar
- 1999 - Alpine Express
- 1998 - Electrifying
- 1997 - Staging
- 1996 - Flavour
- 1995 - Ginzano
- 1994 - Chief De Beers
- 1993 - Sardana
- 1992 - Surtee
- 1991 - Bold Promise
- 1990 - Our Horizon
- 1989 - Gin Rhythm
- 1988 - race not held
- 1987 - Prince Anton
- 1986 - Breakfast Creek
- 1985 - Swiftly Roman
- 1984 - Pete's Choice
- 1983 - Daybreak Lover
- 1982 - Peand

== See also ==
- Doomben 10,000
- Chairman's Handicap (BRC)
- Rough Habit Plate
- List of Australian Group races
- Group races
