= Rough Habit Plate =

- Class: Group 3
- Location: Doomben Racecourse; Brisbane, Australia
- Inaugurated: 1993
- Race type: Thoroughbred - Flat racing
- Sponsor: HKJC (2025)

Race information
- Distance: 2,000 metres
- Surface: Turf
- Track: Right-handed
- Qualification: Three-year-olds
- Weight: Set Weights; Colts and geldings – 57 kg Fillies – 55 kg
- Purse: A$250,000 (2025)

The Rough Habit Plate is a Brisbane Racing Club Group 3 Thoroughbred horse race for horses three years old with set weights, over a distance of 2,000 metres held at Doomben Racecourse in Brisbane, Australia during the Queensland Winter Racing Carnival.

== History ==
It was named in honour of Rough Habit, a New Zealand-bred Thoroughbred racehorse who won 11 Group One (G1) races on both sides of the Tasman Sea. The inaugural running of the race was in 1993 as the Rough Habit 3YO Handicap.

The event is the first middle-distance race for three-year-olds during the winter carnival and is a prep leadup race for the 2400 metre Group 1 Queensland Derby at Eagle Farm Racecourse in June. Six horses have won the Rough Habit Plate–Queensland Derby double:

- Tenor (1994)
- Dodge (1998)
- De Gaulle Lane (2001)
- Empires Choice (2007)
- Brambles (2012)
- Hawkspur (2013).

Jockey Damien Oliver has won this race on five occasions: 1997, 2001, 2002, 2007, 2008.

=== Grade ===
- 1996–2005 - Listed Race
- 2006 onwards Group 3

=== Distance ===
- 1993–2001 – 2020 metres
- 2002–2003 – 2200 metres
- 2004–2011 – 2020 metres
- 2012 – 2000 metres
- 2013 – 2100 metres
- 2014–2019 – 2000 metres
- 2020 – 2200 metres
- 2022 – 2143 metres

=== Other venues ===
- 2013 - Eagle Farm Racecourse
- 2020 - Eagle Farm Racecourse
- 2022 - Eagle Farm Racecourse

== Winners ==
The following are winners of the race.

- 2026 - Kilman
- 2025 - Imperialist
- 2024 - Tannhauser
- 2023 - Special Swey
- 2022 - Dark Destroyer
- 2021 - Criminal Defence
- 2020 - Ballistic Boy
- 2019 - Purple Sector
- 2018 - Dark Dream
- 2017 - Shocking Luck
- 2016 - Mackintosh
- 2015 - Sadler's Lake
- 2014 - Amexed
- 2013 - Hawkspur
- 2012 - Brambles
- 2011 - Fillydelphia
- 2010 - The Hombre
- 2009 - Rockdale
- 2008 - Mission Critical
- 2007 - Empires Choice
- 2006 - Belmonte
- 2005 - Activation
- 2004 - Russian Pearl
- 2003 - Bobs Boy
- 2002 - Distinctly Secret
- 2001 - De Gaulle Lane
- 2000 - Kincourt
- 1999 - Figurehead
- 1998 - Dodge
- 1997 - Marble Halls
- 1996 - Revenge
- 1995 - Juggler
- 1994 - Tenor
- 1993 - Square the Circle

== See also ==
- Doomben 10,000
- Chairman's Handicap (BRC)
- Spirit Of Boom Classic
- List of Australian Group races
- Group races
