= Bernborough =

Australian-bred Thoroughbred racehorse

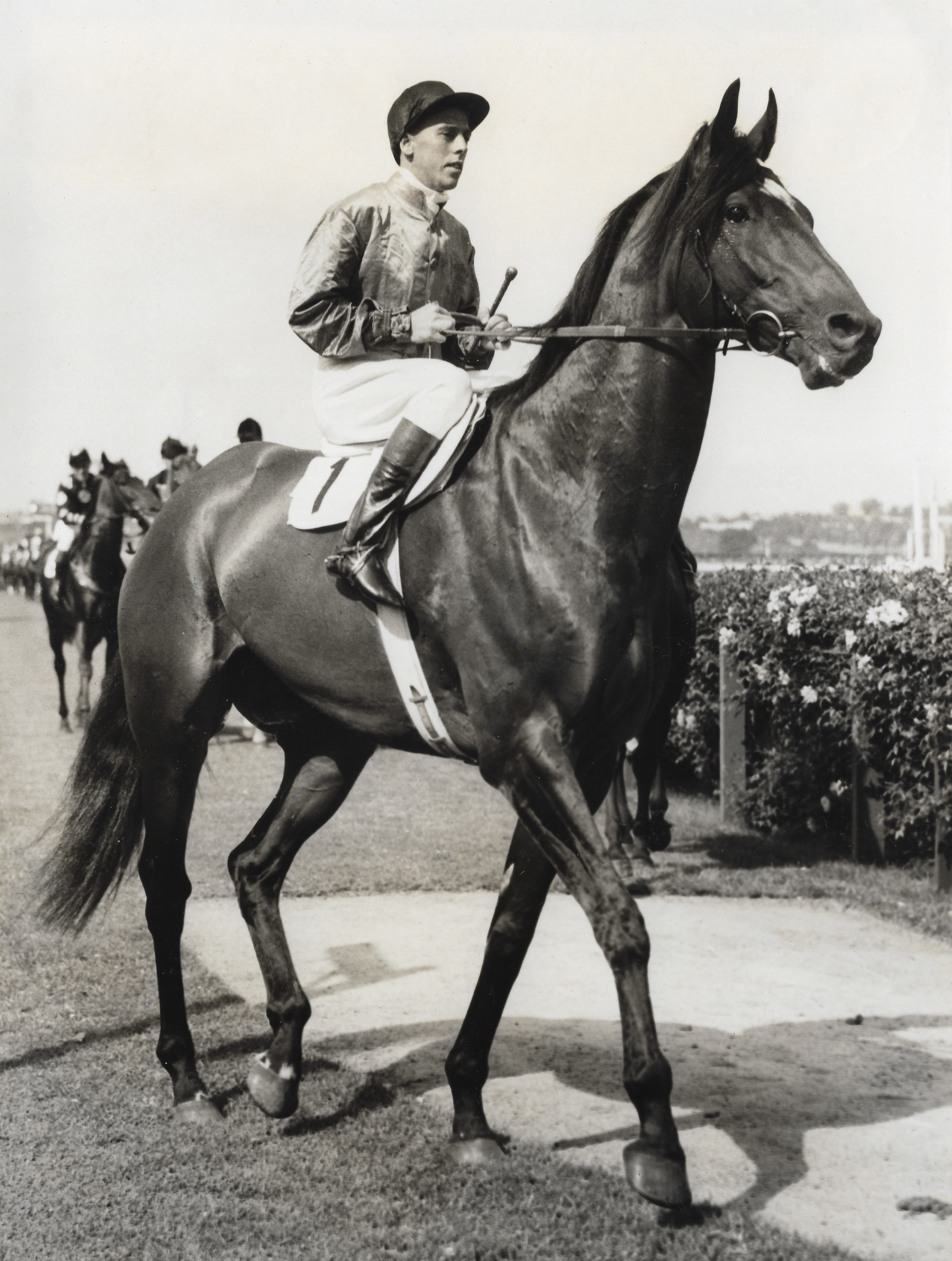
- Bernborough and Athol Mulley; Flemington Racecourse
- Sire: Emborough (GB)
- Grandsire: Gainsborough
- Dam: Bern Maid
- Damsire: Bernard (GB)
- Sex: Stallion
- Foaled: 1939
- Country: Australia
- Colour: Bay
- Breeder: Estate of Harry J. Winten
- Owner: Frank and John R. Bach; A.E.Hadwin; Azzalin O. Romano (at age 6)
- Trainer: Gordon Neale; Bobby Mitchell; Dinny Callinan; Francis Roberts; Harry Plant
- Record: 37: 26-2-1
- Earnings: £25,504

Major wins
- Villiers Stakes (1945); All Aged Stakes (1946); Hill Stakes (1946); Warwick Stakes (1946); Rawson Stakes (1946); Caulfield Stakes (1946); Chelmsford Stakes (1946); Chipping Norton Stakes (1946); Melbourne Stakes (1946); Futurity Stakes (1946); Newmarket Handicap (1946); Doomben 10,000 (1946); Doomben Cup (1946)

Honours
- Australian Racing Hall of Fame
- Last updated on 13 June 2011

Bernborough (1939–1960) was an outstanding Australian-bred Thoroughbred racehorse who competed from 1941 to 1946. He carried heavy weights in 15 consecutive wins that included the Doomben 10,000 while carrying 10 stone 5 pounds.

Bernborough was foaled at Rosalie Plains near the township of Oakey in the Darling Downs in Queensland. The bay colt was by the good sire Emborough (GB) from Bern Maid by Bernard (GB), who was the paternal grandson of Gainsborough, winner of the English Triple Crown in 1918.

== Racing record ==
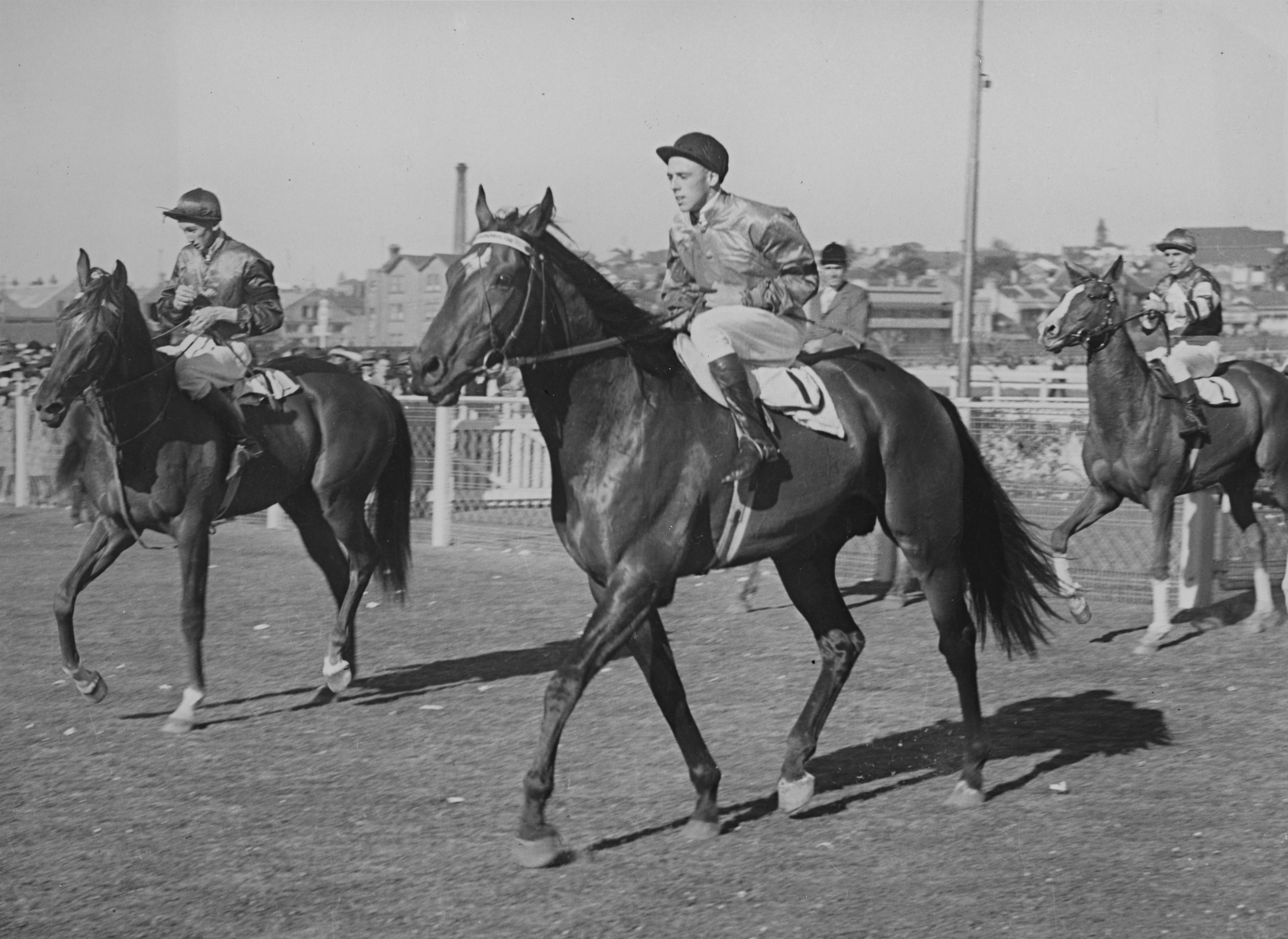
Bernborough after the 1946 Chelmsford Stakes Randwick Racecourse

Bernborough first raced under the ownership of A.E.Hadwin. A Queensland trainer, J. Roberts, then leased the horse. He came to prominence racing at Toowoomba's Clifford Park when ridden to his first six wins by Les Watterson. Bernborough only raced at Toowoomba in Queensland as he was barred from racing at metropolitan tracks because of ownership doubts. His racing colours were orange, purple sleeves, and black cap. His trainer was Harry Plant. When he was six years old, he was moved to Sydney and following his sale to A.O. Romano for 2,600 guineas, his nominations were accepted. Then he began a winning streak of 15 races. His wins included the Newmarket Handicap at Flemington carrying 9 st 13 lb (63 kg) and the Doomben Cup under 10 st 11 lb (68 kg). He started 37 times for 26 wins, 2 seconds, and 1 third.

On 2 November 1946, Bernborough had his last race in the LKS MacKinnon Stakes. Challenging for the lead just after entering the home straight, he suffered torn sesamoid ligaments and had to be pulled up. The great mare Flight, who had finished second to Bernborough on many occasions, went on to win.

== 1946 racebook ==
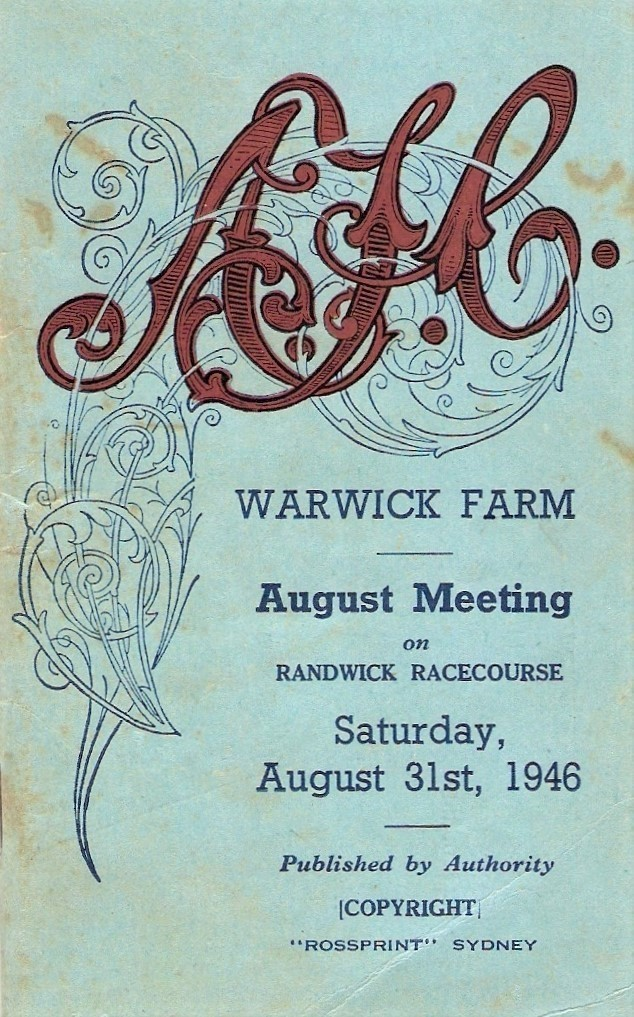
1946 AJC Warwick Stakes racebook front cover

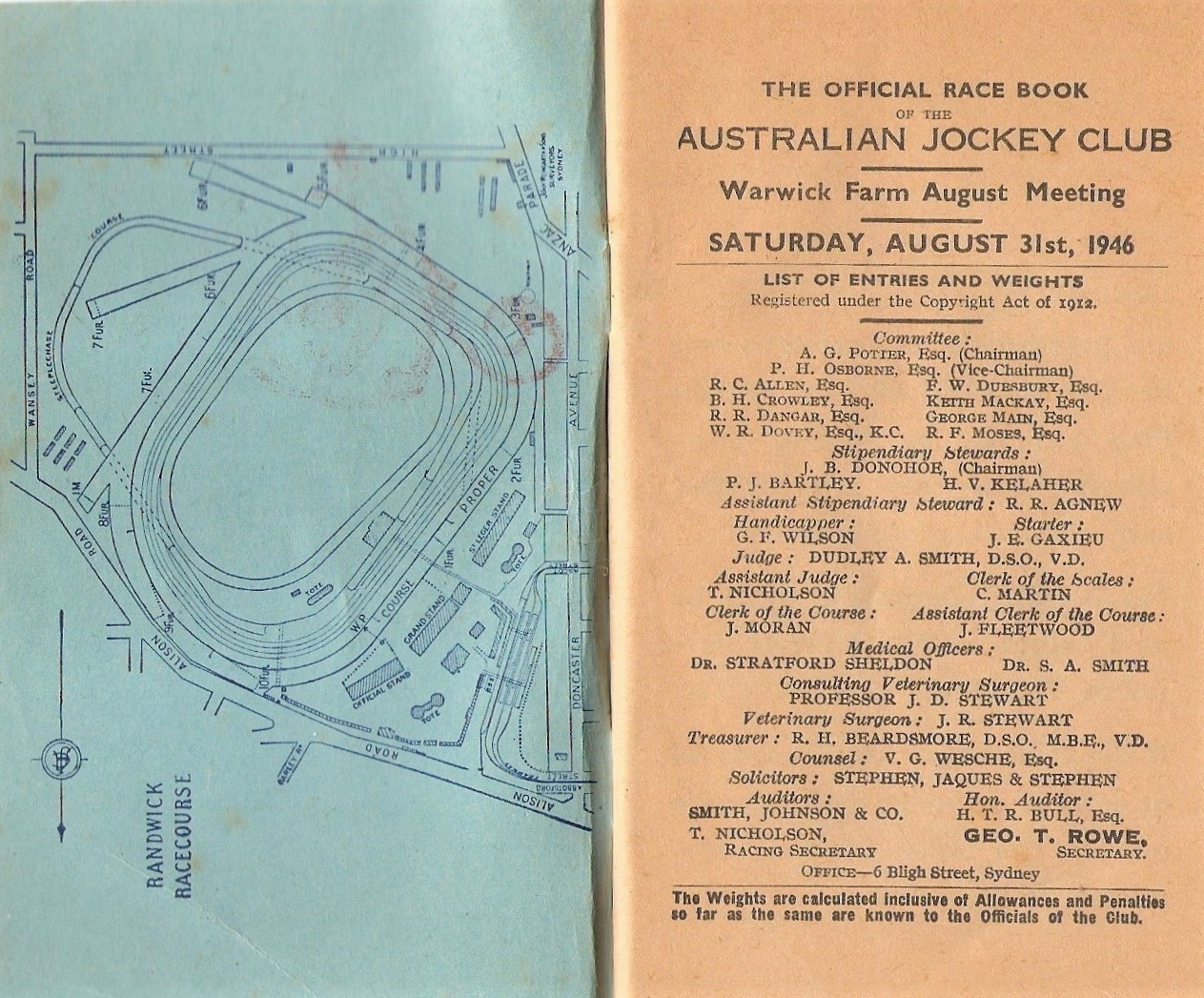
1946 AJC Warwick Stakes page showing raceday officials

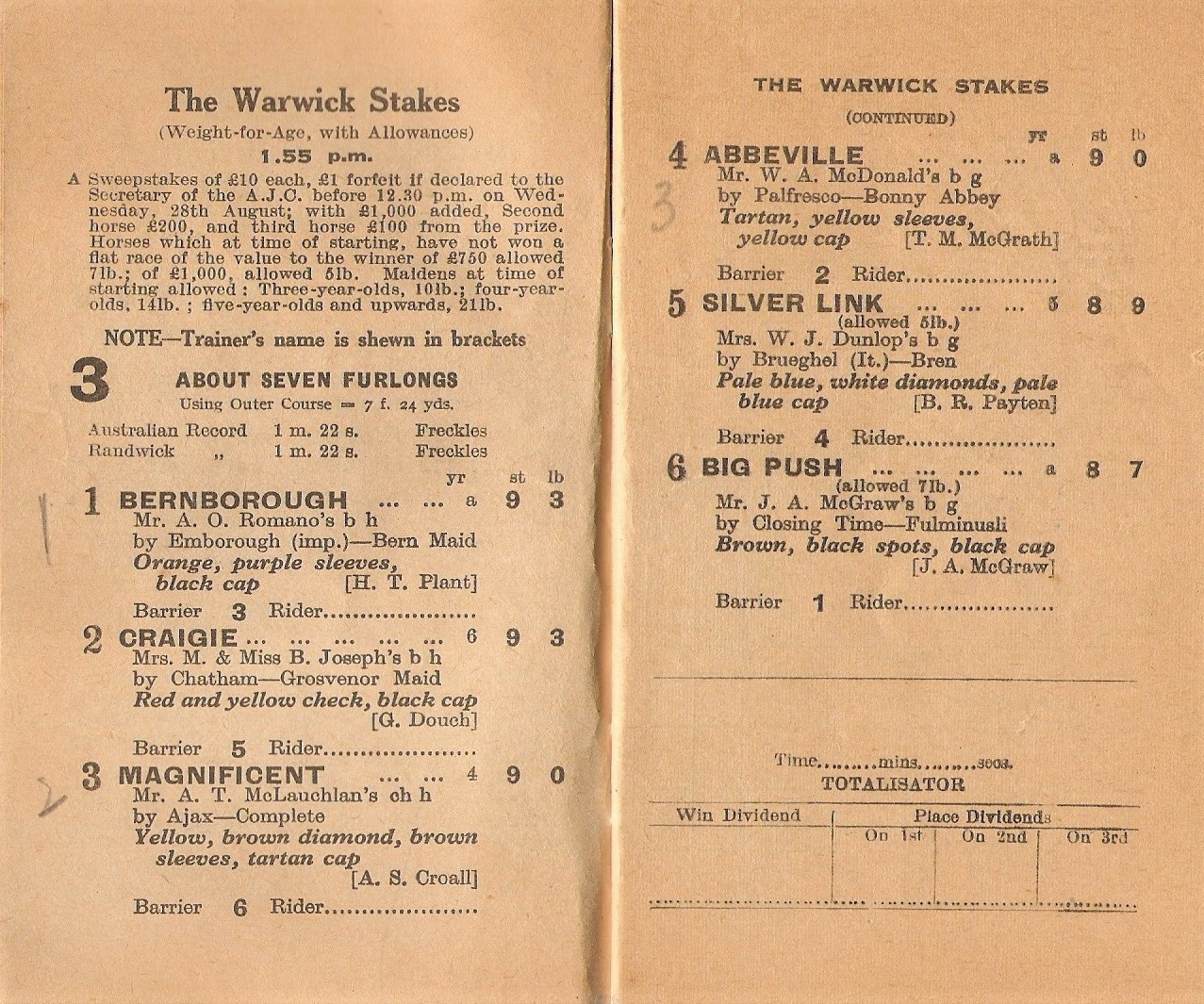
1946 AJC Warwick Stakes starters and results showing the winner, Bernborough

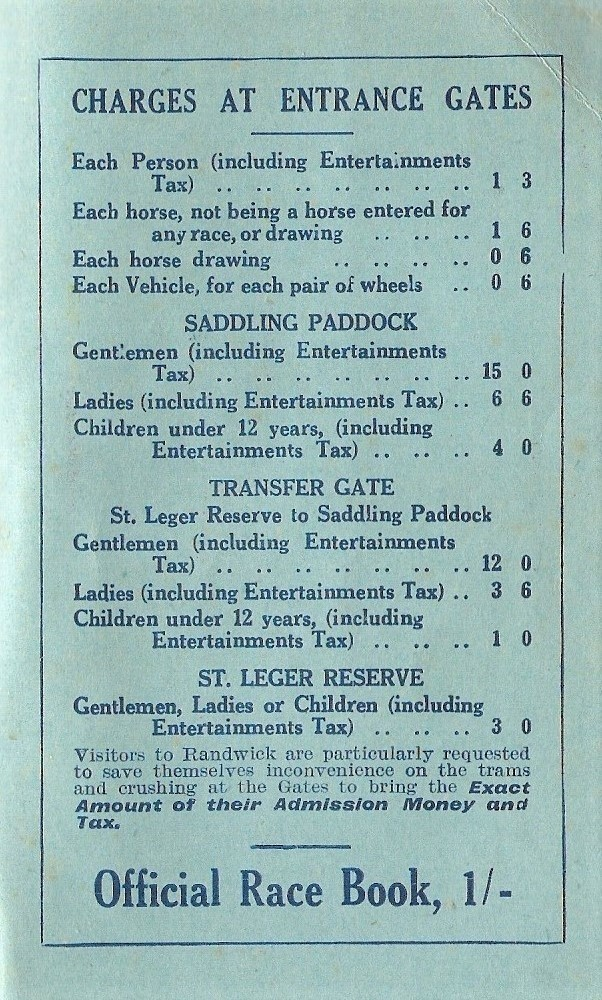
Back cover showing charges at the entrance gates

== Stud record ==
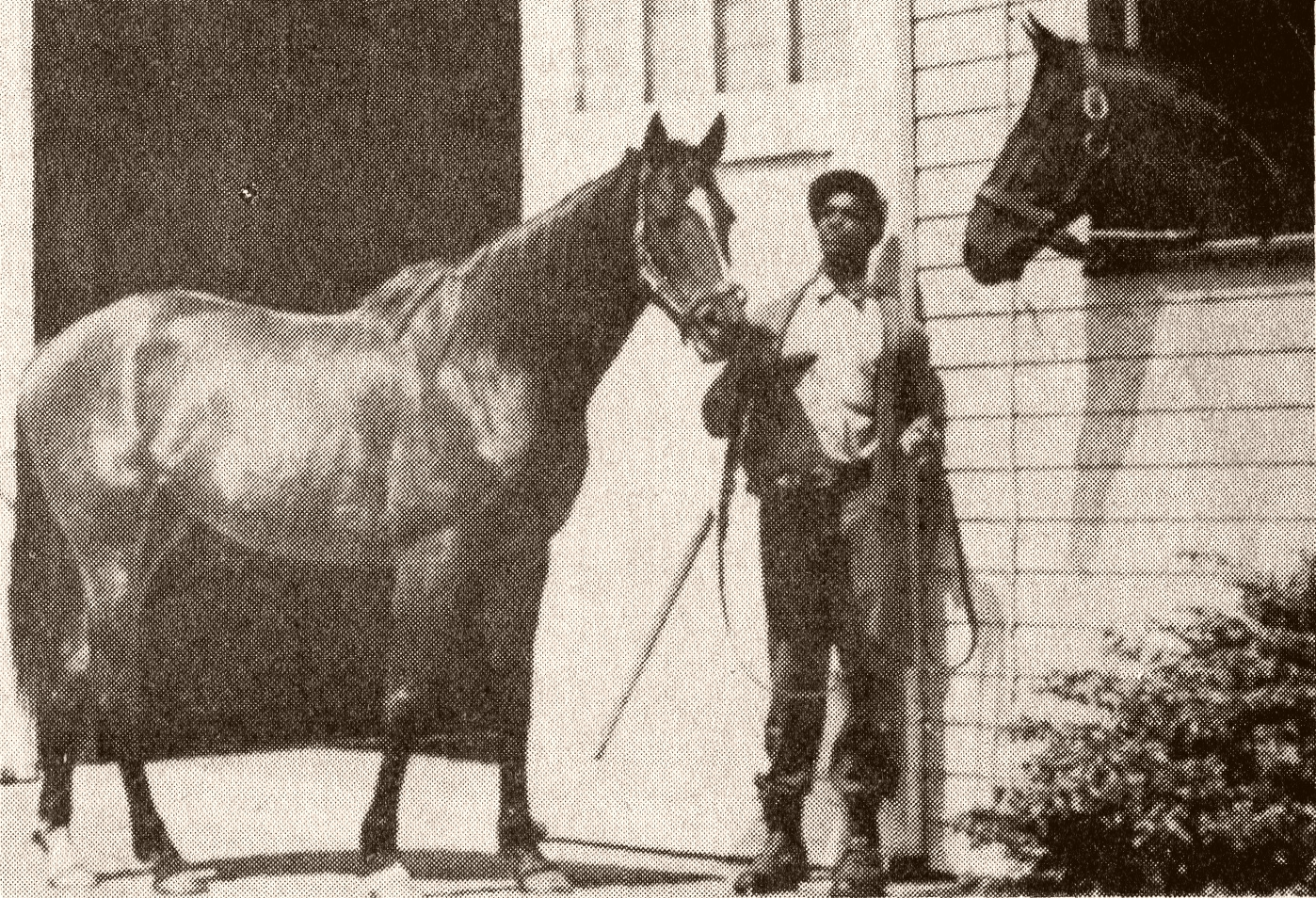
Bernborough meets Shannon in America.

After recovering from his injuries, Bernborough was sold in 1946 for a record £93,000 to movie producer Louis B. Mayer for stud duties in the USA, where he went on to moderate success as a stallion at Spendthrift Farm in Lexington, Kentucky. Here he sired the winners of more than $4,500,000 in prize money and was placed high on the Leading sire in North America list.

Bernborough's progeny included:

- Berseem, champion American sprinter
- Bernwood, established a new world record, 1 min. 33.8 seconds, for a mile.
- First Aid, won the Whitney Handicap and $223,527
- Hook Money, sire of Shandon Belle (won Irish 1,000 Guineas)

== Honours ==
Bernborough was one of the five inaugural inductees into the Australian Racing Hall of Fame, alongside other turf notables Carbine, Phar Lap, Kingston Town, and Tulloch. He is commemorated in the township of Oakey with a life-size bronze statue located outside the Jondaryan Council chambers.

In 1978, he was honoured on a postage stamp issued by Australia Post.

== In culture ==
In his 2015 memoir Something for the Pain: A Memoir of the Turf, Gerald Murnane makes Bernborough the subject of his third chapter. He names it as a personal favorite and claims that it is for him the greatest racing horse ever "bred in Australia".

== See also ==
- List of leading Thoroughbred racehorses
- List of racehorses
