= Bore Head =

Australian Thoroughbred racehorse

- Sire: Double Bore (GB)
- Grandsire: Borealis
- Dam: Mauna Kea
- Damsire: Brimstone (GB)
- Sex: Stallion
- Foaled: 1959
- Country: Australia
- Colour: Bay
- Owner: Bob Chaplain and Carmel Burke
- Trainer: D. Judd; Ron Dillon

Major wins
- Queensland Cup (1963); Caulfield Cup (1965); Australian Cup (1967); Doomben Cup (1967)

Honours
- Bore Head Handicap at Sandown
- Last updated on 3 August 2011

Bore Head was one of Queensland's best staying Thoroughbred racehorses with wins in five cups, the Ipswich, Queensland, Caulfield, Australian and Doomben.

He was a bay colt foaled in 1959 by Double Bore (GB), his dam, Mauna Kea was by Brimstone (GB). Bore Head's half-brother Hillside, by Todman, was another useful galloper. Brother and sister Robert Chaplain and Carmel Burke owned Hillside and Bore Head, trained by D. Judd and Ron Dillon.

Bore Head won the 1963 Queensland Cup with Fred Clarke in the saddle, carrying just 7 stone 1 pound, defeating Booberanna, 1964 Ipswich Cup (dead-heat with Isaacson), 1965 Caulfield Cup, 1965 QTC Moreton Handicap, 1965 QTC Sir Winston Churchill Stakes and in 1967 the Australian Cup and the Doomben Cup. He was placed in several other top staying races including the Brisbane Cup and Moonee Valley Cup (twice). After winning the Doomben Cup Bore Head had a further 31 race starts without a victory.

After winning the 1965 Caulfield Cup, many thought he stood a good chance in the Melbourne Cup of that year (won by Light Fingers, trained by Bart Cummings). But he lost his chance when the horse in front of him fell, taking Bore Head and another horse down in a three-horse tumble. Jockey Fred Clarke was convinced that Bore Head was on his way to winning the cup that day. The following year he placed twelfth in the race behind another Cummings-trained horse, Galilee.

== Bibliography ==
- Linneth, T. (1992). "Cup Fall Haunted Top Hoop." Sunday Mail (Queensland). 29 November.
- Oberhardt, Mark (2004). "Your Questions." Courier Mail. 1 November.
