= Dark Dream (horse) =

Australian-bred Thoroughbred racehorse

- Sire: All American
- Grandsire: Red Ransom
- Dam: Buchanan Girl
- Damsire: Lion Hunter
- Sex: Gelding
- Foaled: 30 October 2014
- Country: Australia
- Colour: Grey
- Owner: Miss M Basson and Miss J M Wilson (Nov 2017-Dec 2018); Albert Hung Chao Hong (Dec 2018-current)
- Trainer: Kerry Parker (Nov 2017-Dec 2018); Frankie Lor (Dec 2018-current)
- Record: 18-6-6-3
- Earnings: A$1,772,360

Major wins
- Rough Habit Plate (G3)(2018); Queensland Derby (G1)(2018)
- Last updated on 10 June 2018

Dark Dream (foaled 30 October 2014) is a Thoroughbred racehorse trained and bred in Australia. He won the Queensland Derby, a Group One race, and has won over half a million dollars.

== Career ==
=== Australia ===
Dark Dream had his first race 21 November 2017, starting as a $15 outsider. Breaking his maiden on debut, he collected $16710 winnings. His next two races were seconds at Kembla Grange and Royal Randwick. Dark Dream had his next win on a Friday night at Canterbury Park in January 2018. With betting opening at $3.50, he jumped as $1.60 favourite, winning by a length and a half.

Returning in March 2018, Dark Dream had two seconds before travelling to Brisbane to race in the Group 3 Gunsynd Classic, where, "he charged hard late before missing by just 0.1L. No other horse ever looked likely and there was a 5.5L margin between Dark Dream and [the] third placegetter."

A fortnight later, Dark Dream won the Rough Habit Plate. Starting from a wide gate, he had to use up energy to settle third, but powered home to win by 4 lengths. Jockey Tim Clark said, "He hasn't put it together yet, but the talent is definitely there He's a horse you have to ride a bit ugly, you can't sit on him too pretty. He travelled up really strongly on the turn and put them away in a couple of strides. He's definitely a true stayer because he was strong on the line." Trainer Kerry Parker subsequently admitted there has been many international offers to buy the horse, saying, "The owners did get a little wobbly at one stage, but they have stuck solid and so far so good. They can get silly money for a three-year-old gelding, so you have to weigh it up. I know if I owned him he would probably be sold because it probably changes my life."

Dark Dream next finished third in the Grand Prix Stakes, with his jockey claiming it was a good effort considering he lost a shoe in the race.

Next, Dark Dream won the Queensland Derby, giving trainer Parker his first Group 1 victory. He said, "He is just a real stayer and I knew I had him right, but this is a Derby – they don’t give them away. I wanted him to go because I know how strong he is. When he took over at the 600m I thought 'it's up to you now boy', and he was the strongest stayer." Weeks later it was announced Dark Dream had been sold to Hong Kong and trained by Frankie Lor.

Breeder Mary Jane Basson was awarded Small Breeder of the Year in 2018 by the Thoroughbred Breeders NSW for her efforts in breeding Dark Dream noting that she paid $800 for his dam Buchanan Girl.

=== Hong Kong ===
After two trials, Dark Dream made his debut in Sha Tin in December, finishing third in a class 2 race. A fortnight later he was said to have "destroyed" his rivals as he came from behind to win by 4 and a half lengths, with jockey de Sousa noting, "he is still a bit green and he got to the 300m and he just starts looking around. He’s just immature and still getting to know the place."

Entering the Group 1 Hong Kong Classic Cup as odds-on favourite, Dark Dream ran second to 90-1 stablemate Mission Tycoon in February 2019. The top 3 finishers of the race are awarded entrance into the Group 1 Hong Kong Derby, where he finished fourth, with another stablemate, Furore, winning.

Next was the Class 1 Harlech Handicap on 7 April 2019. Winning by a length, he set the third fastest time for the track over 2000 metres, though jockey Zac Purton noted, "“Obviously he has run the time on the clock but there were a few races out there where the time seemed a little bit faster than the way the race was run, that’s because there was a very strong wind out there. He is getting there, I don’t think we have seen the best of him." Three weeks later, Dark Dream finished seventh in the $HK24 million Queen Elizabeth II Cup, and then third in the Hong Kong Champions & Chater Cup.
