= Ortensia (horse) =

Australian-bred Thoroughbred racehorse

- Sire: Testa Rossa (AUS)
- Grandsire: Perugino (USA)
- Dam: Aerate's Pick (AUS)
- Damsire: Picknicker (AUS)
- Sex: Mare
- Foaled: 16 September 2005
- Died: 5 June 2016 (aged 10)
- Country: Australia
- Colour: Bay
- Breeder: L D Rhodes
- Owner: A D Fraser, Ms A Fraser & Miss E Ridley
- Trainer: Tony Noonan; Paul Messara
- Record: 38: 13–3–4
- Earnings: A$1,423,867; US$600,000; £222,712; and HK$490,000

Major wins
- Thousand Guineas Prelude (2008); P J Bell Stakes (2009); Glenlogan Park Stakes (2009); QTC Cup (2009); Winterbottom Stakes (2009, 2011); G H Mumm Stakes (2011); Al Quoz Sprint (2012); King George Stakes (2012); Nunthorpe Stakes (2012)
- Last updated on 6 June 2016

Ortensia (foaled 16 September 2005 – 5 June 2016) was an Australian thoroughbred racehorse. A sprinter, she won Group One races on three continents. The mare died while in foal to Redoutes Choice on the weekend of 4/5 June 2016, having to be euthanized due to a tumour that developed on one of her lungs, severely reducing her ability to breathe. She has two fillies a yearling by Choisir and a weanling by Dream Ahead. Ortensia was 10 years old.

== Background ==
Ortensia was a bay mare bred in New South Wales by L. D. Rhodes. She is one of many successful sprinters and milers sired by Testa Rossa who won six Grade One races in 1999 and 2000. Testa Rossa is currently based at the Vinery Stud in the Hunter Valley, New South Wales.

== 2012: International campaign ==
After establishing herself as a successful performer in Australia, Ortensia embarked on an international campaign in 2012. Ortensia won the Al Quoz Sprint at Meydan Racecourse in March and was then sent to England for the European summer. Initial results were disappointing as she was well-beaten in the King's Stand Stakes (ninth behind the Hong Kong sprinter Little Bridge) and the July Cup (fourth behind Mayson). In July however, she was ridden by William Buick to a victory in the Group Two King George Stakes at Goodwood Racecourse and followed up a month later by taking the Group One Nunthorpe Stakes at York Racecourse. She came from a seemingly impossible position in the latter race two furlongs from the finish to win by a neck from Spirit Quartz.

== Major Race Wins ==
Date	Race name	D	Course	Class	Prize	Margin	Time	Jockey
20 September 2008	Thousand Guineas Prelude	1400m	Caulfield	G3	A$75,000	0.8	1:26.02	Danny Nikolic
30 May 2009	QTC Cup	1300m	Eagle Farm	G2	A$96,000	0.1	1:19.13	Craig Williams
28 November 2009	Winterbottom Stakes	1200m	Ascot, WA	G2	A$300,000	1.5	1:08.56	Craig Williams
19 November 2011	Winterbottom Stakes	1200m	Ascot, WA	G1	A$300,000	1.0	1:10.10	Craig Williams
31 March 2012	Al Quoz Sprint	1000m	Meydan	G1	US$600,000	1.25	57.98	Craig Williams
3 August 2012	King George Stakes	5f	Goodwood	G2	£56,710	1.25	57.24	William Buick
24 August 2012	Nunthorpe Stakes	5f	York	G1	£141,775	0.4	57.62	William Buick
