= Queensland Oaks =

- Class: Group 1
- Location: Eagle Farm Racecourse; Brisbane, Australia
- Inaugurated: 1951
- Race type: Thoroughbred - Flat racing
- Sponsor: Channel 7 (2021-26)

Race information
- Distance: 2,200 metres
- Surface: Turf
- Track: Right-handed
- Qualification: Three year old fillies
- Weight: Set weights - 56 1/2 kg
- Purse: A$700,000 (2026)

The Queensland Oaks is a Brisbane Racing Club Group 1 Thoroughbred horse race for three-year-old fillies, at set weights, run over a distance of 2200 metres at Eagle Farm Racecourse, Brisbane during the Queensland Winter Racing Carnival.

== History ==
The inaugural running of the race was run as the Queensland Oaks Stakes during the Christmas meeting at Eagle Farm on 27 December 1951 when short odds-on favourite Malt Maid was victorious. By 1953 the race was run on the Queensland Cup race card in November. The race was moved as part of the Brisbane Winter Carnival in 1973.

=== Grade ===
- 1951–1979 - Principal race
- 1980 onwards - Group 1 race

=== Distance ===
- 1951–1972 - 1 1/2 miles
- 1973–1982 – 2400 metres
- 1983 – 2432 metres
- 1984–2014 – 2400 metres
- 2015 – 2200 metres
- 2016 – 2400 metres
- 2017 onwards – 2200 metres

=== Venue ===
Due to track reconstruction of Eagle Farm Racecourse for the 2014–15 racing season, the event was transferred to Doomben Racecourse with a shorter distance of 2200 metres.

- 2015, 2017, 2018, 2019 - Doomben Racecourse

== Winners ==
The following are previous winners of the Queensland Oaks.

- 2026 - Fireball Miss
- 2025 - You Wahng
- 2024 - Socks Nation
- 2023 - Amokura
- 2022 - Gypsy Goddess
- 2021 - Duais
- 2020 - ‡race not held
- 2019 - Winning Ways
- 2018 - Youngstar
- 2017 - Egg Tart
- 2016 - Provocative
- 2015 - Winx
- 2014 - Tinto
- 2013 - Gondokoro
- 2012 - Quintessential
- 2011 - Scarlett Lady
- 2010 - Miss Keepsake
- 2009 - Purple
- 2008 - Riva San
- 2007 - Eskimo Queen
- 2006 - Allow
- 2005 - Vitesse Dane
- 2004 - Vouvray
- 2003 - Zagalia
- 2002 - Mon Mekki
- 2001 - Ethereal
- 2000 - Giovana
- 1999 - Miss Danehill
- 1998 - Zacheline
- 1997 - Crystal Palace
- 1996 - Arctic Scent
- 1995 - Joie Denise
- 1994 - Booked
- 1993 - Slight Chance
- 1992 - Royal Magic
- 1991 - Triscay
- 1990 - A Little Kiss
- 1989 - Triumphal Queen
- 1988 - Bravery
- 1987 - Round The World
- 1986 - Travel Light
- 1985 - Tristram Rose
- 1984 - Look Aloft
- 1983 - Lady Plutus
- 1982 - Mother Of Pearl
- 1981 - November Rain
- 1980 - Lowan Star
- 1979 - Prunella
- 1978 - Show Ego
- 1977 - Surround
- 1976 - Denise's Joy
- 1975 - Zasu
- 1974 - Bonnybel
- 1973 - Analie
- 1972 - Meanmi Shadow
- 1971 - Mode
- 1970 - Affectionate
- 1969 - Kazan Retto
- 1968 - Bright Shadow
- 1967 - Ryeleah
- 1966 - Blue Roc
- 1965 - Kulali
- 1964 - Eye Shadow
- 1963 - Aspalita
- 1962 - Hoa Hine
- 1961 - Winnipeg II
- 1960 - Ton
- 1959 - Golden Stockade
- 1958 - Orient
- 1957 - race not held
- 1956 - Urgona
- 1955 - Evening Peal
- 1954 - Mian Mir
- 1953 - Caeneus
- 1952 - Lady Hannah
- 1951 - Malt Maid

‡ Not held because of the COVID-19 pandemic

== See also ==
- Doomben Roses
- Kingsford-Smith Cup
- Moreton Cup
- Queensland Derby
- List of Australian Group races
- Group races
