= Tattersall's Tiara =

Tattersall's Club Tiara
- Class: Group 1
- Location: Eagle Farm; Brisbane, Australia
- Inaugurated: 1989 (as Winter Stakes)
- Race type: Thoroughbred - Flat racing

Race information
- Distance: 1,400 metres
- Surface: Turf
- Track: Right-handed
- Qualification: Fillies and Mares
- Weight: Weight for Age
- Purse: A$700,000 (2026)

The Tattersall's Club Tiara is a Tattersall's Racing Club Group 1 Thoroughbred horse race held under Weight for Age conditions, for fillies and mares aged three years old and upwards, over a distance of 1400 metres at Eagle Farm Racecourse, Brisbane, Australia in June.

== History ==
The race was first run in 1989 and was known as the Winter Stakes until 2011.

=== Grade ===
- 1992–1995 - Listed Race
- 1996–2005 - Group 3
- 2006 - Group 2
- 2007 onwards Group 1

This race is the final Group 1 race of the season in Australia.

=== Distance ===
- 1989–2006 – 1500 metres
- 2007–2016 – 1400 metres
- 2017 onwards - 1350 metres

=== Venue ===
Due to track reconstruction of Eagle Farm Racecourse for the 2014–15 racing season the event was transferred to Gold Coast Racecourse.

- 2017 - Doomben Racecourse
- 2018 - Doomben Racecourse
- 2019 onwards - Eagle Farm Racecourse

== Winners ==
The following are past winners of the race.

- 2026 - Splash Back
- 2025 -Tashi
- 2024 - Bella Nipotina
- 2023 - Palaisapan
- 2022 - Startantes
- 2021 - Tofane
- 2020 - ‡race not held
- 2019 - Invincibella
- 2018 - Prompt Response
- 2017 - Tycoon Tara
- 2016 - Miss Cover Girl
- 2015 - Srikandi
- 2014 - Cosmic Endeavour
- 2013 - Red Tracer
- 2012 - Pear Tart
- 2011 - Yosei
- 2010 - Melito
- 2009 - Russeting
- 2008 - Absolut Glam
- 2007 - Nova Star
- 2006 - La Sizeranne
- 2005 - Charmview
- 2004 - Miss Potential
- 2003 - Mon Mekki
- 2002 - Heptonstall
- 2001 - Porto Roca
- 2000 - Bonanova
- 1999 - Bonanova
- 1998 - Razor Blade
- 1997 - Dane Ripper
- 1996 - Tripping
- 1995 - Mamzelle Pedrille
- 1994 - Zetoile
- 1993 - Rich Pageantry
- 1992 - Blushing Bijou
- 1991 - Rose Road
- 1990 - Piper's Belle
- 1989 - La Posette

‡ Not held because of the COVID-19 pandemic

== See also ==
- W J Healy Stakes
- Tattersall's Cup
- List of Australian Group races
- Group races
