= Doomben Cup =

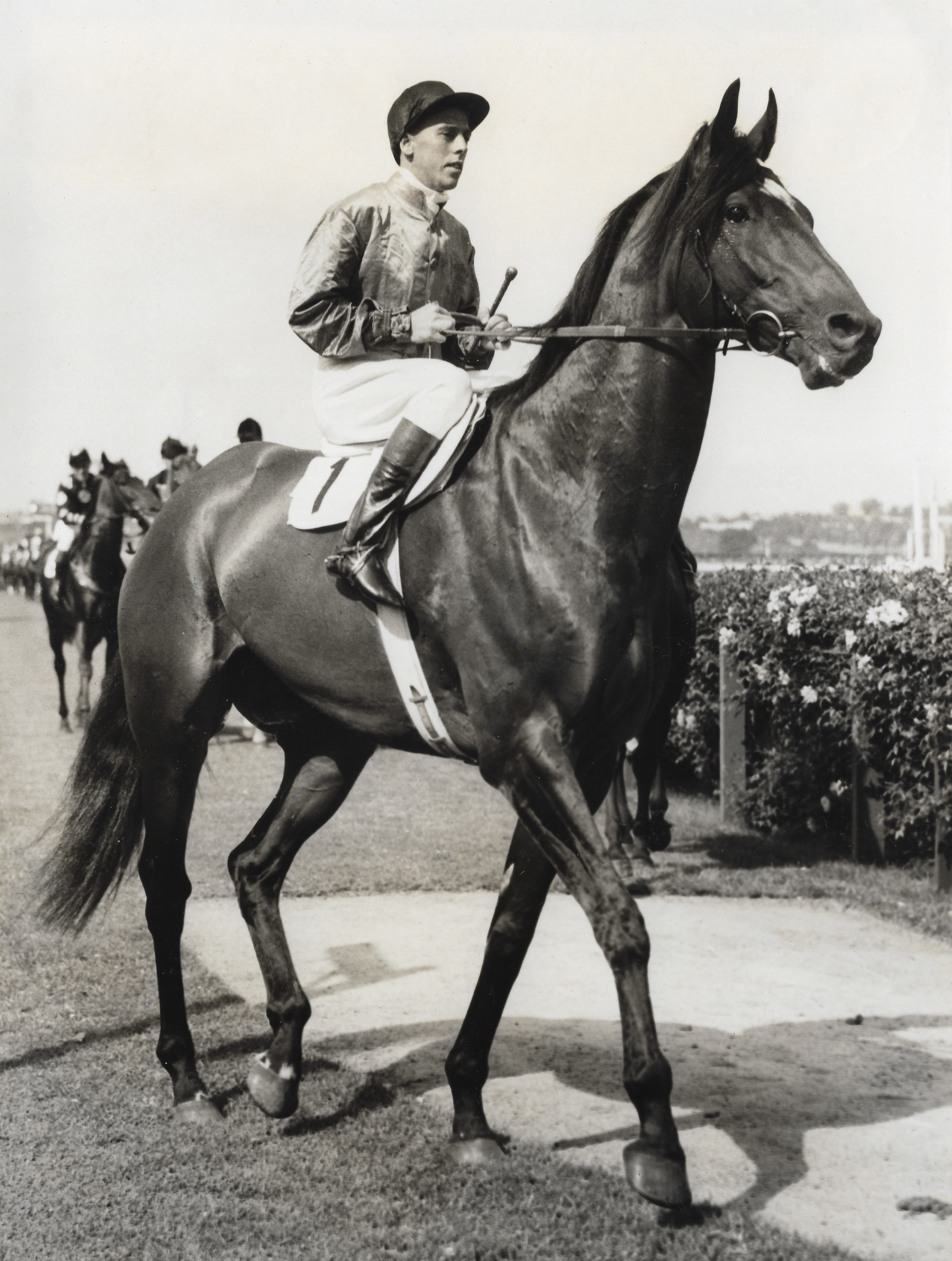
- Bernborough,1946 winner
- Class: Group 1
- Location: Doomben Racecourse; Brisbane, Australia
- Inaugurated: 1933
- Race type: Thoroughbred - Flat racing
- Sponsor: XXXX (2022-2026)

Race information
- Distance: 2,000 metres
- Surface: Turf
- Track: Right-handed
- Qualification: Horses three years old and older
- Weight: Weight for Age
- Purse: A$1,000,000 (2026)

The Doomben Cup is a Brisbane Racing Club Group 1 Thoroughbred horse race for horses three years old and older, run under Weight for Age conditions over a distance of 2000 metres at Doomben Racecourse, Brisbane, Australia during the Queensland Winter Racing Carnival.

== History ==
The race was first held in 1933 as a principal race won by Pentheus in a time of 2.05.7 over the 10 furlongs. Among the outstanding stayers to win the Doomben Cup in its early years include Bernborough in 1946. The New Zealand bred Rough Habit won the race three times from 1991–1993. The only dual winners are:

- Earlwood (1959 and 1960)
- Scenic Shot (2009 and 2011)
- Huetor (2022 and 2023).

The only two horses to have won the Doomben Cup-Brisbane Cup double are Lord Hybrow (1988) and Scenic Shot (2009).

=== Name ===
- 1933–1982 - BATC Doomben Cup
- 1983–1987 - XXXX Cup
- 1988 - Channel Nine Cup
- 1989–1991 - XXXX Cup
- 1992 onwards - Doomben Cup

=== Grade ===
- 1933–1979 - Principal Race
- 1980 onwards - Group 1

=== Distance ===
- 1933–1937 - 1 1/4 miles (~2000 metres)
- 1938–1972 - 1 3/8 miles (~2200 metres)
- 1973–1988 – 2200 metres
- 1989 – 2160 metres
- 1990–2005 – 2020 metres
- 1996 – 2040 metres
- 1997–2006 – 2200 metres
- 2007–2011 – 2020 metres
- 2012 onwards - 2000 metres

=== Records ===
Multiple winning jockeys include:

- Blake Shinn in 2014, 2015, 2024 and 2025.
- Maurice McCarten (1933, 1934, 1940) and also as a trainer in 1952
- Jim Cassidy (1991–1993) on Rough Habit
- Kerrin McEvoy (2010, 2016, 2022).

Multiple winning trainers include:

- Chris Waller (horse trainer) (2010, 2013 2018, 2026)
- T J Smith (1973, 1976, 1978)
- John Wheeler (1991–1993) with Rough Habit

=== 1949 racebook ===
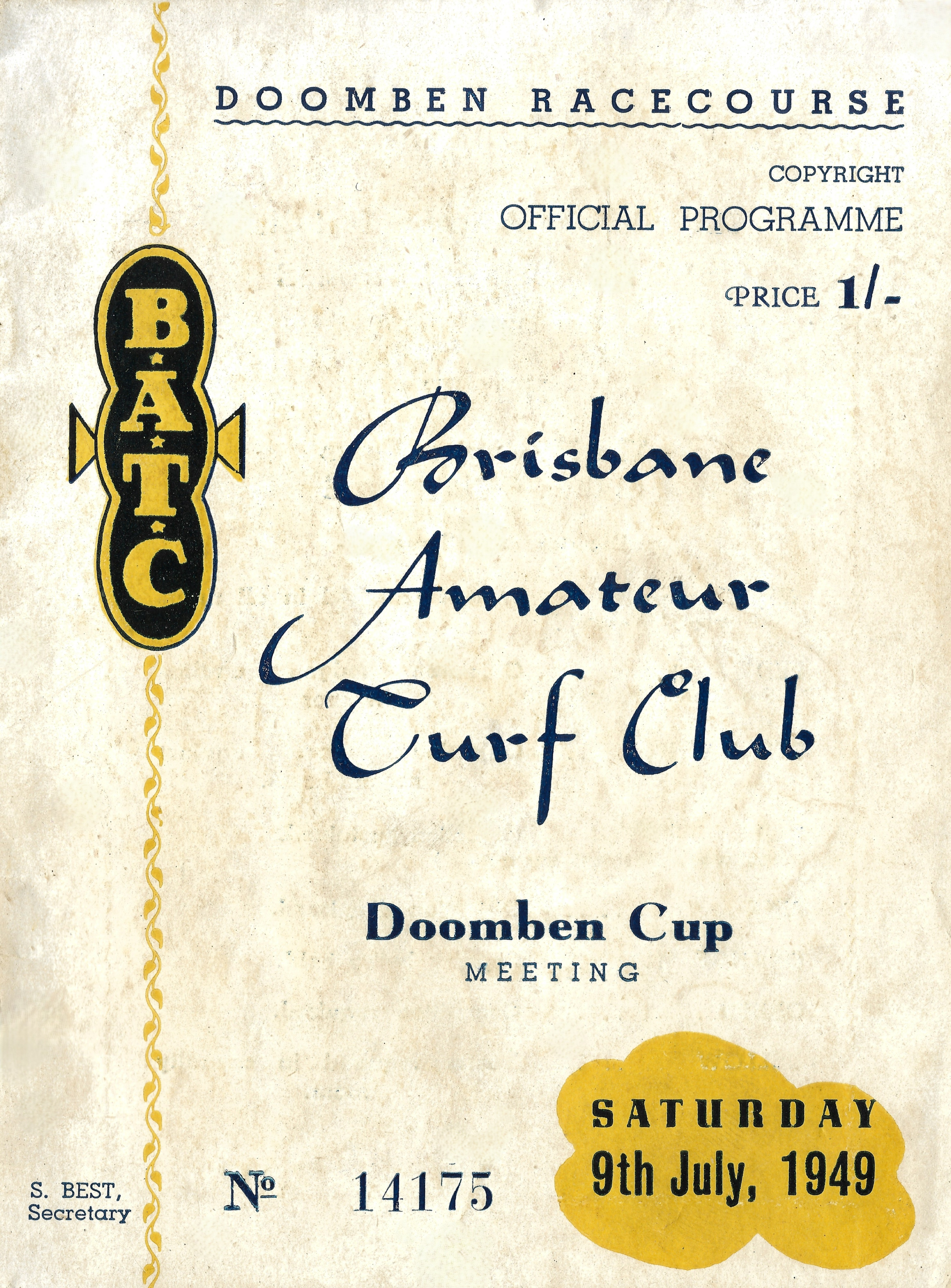
1949 BATC Doomben Cup racebook front cover

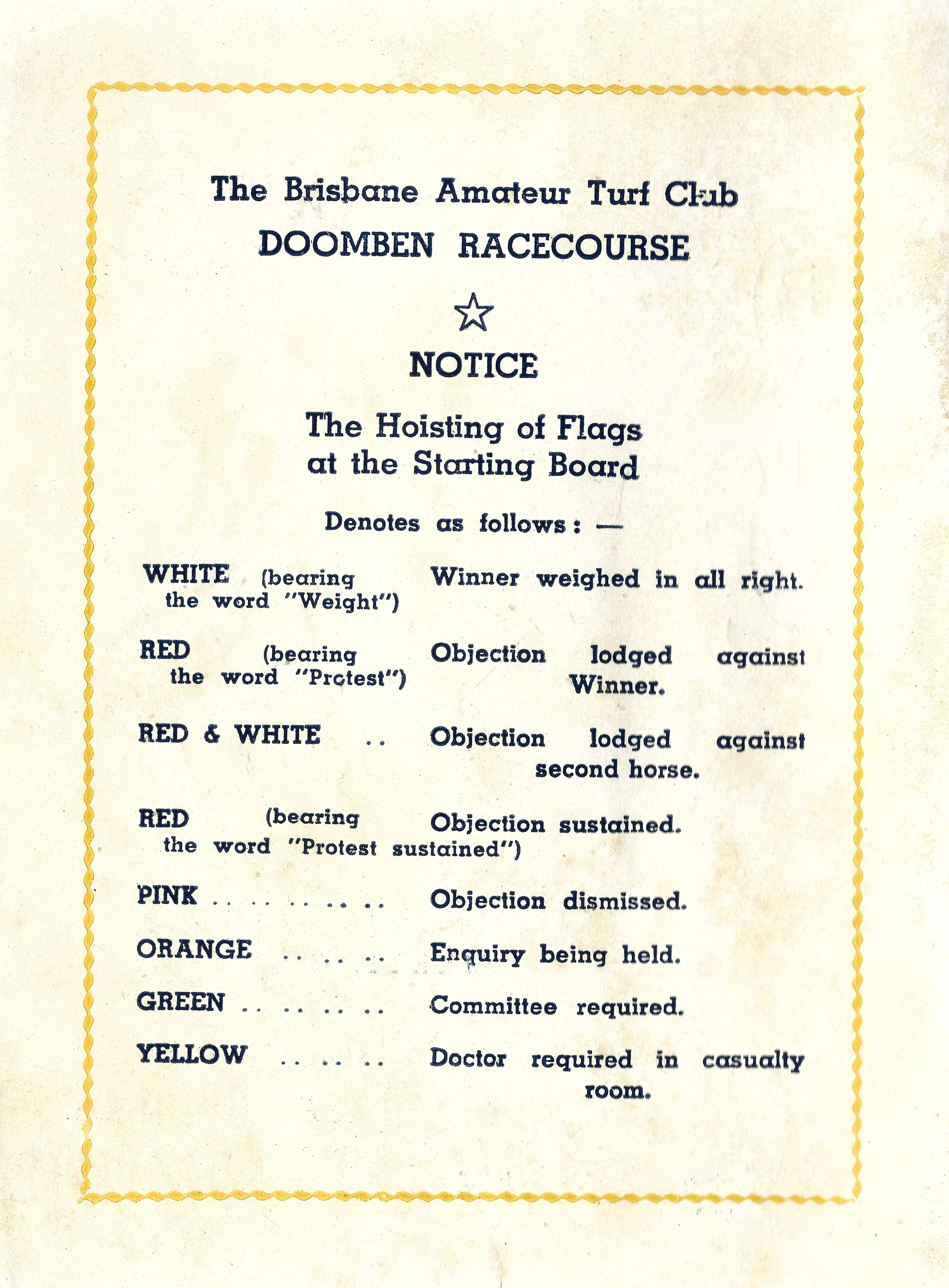
1949 BATC Doomben Cup racebook showing hoisting of the flags

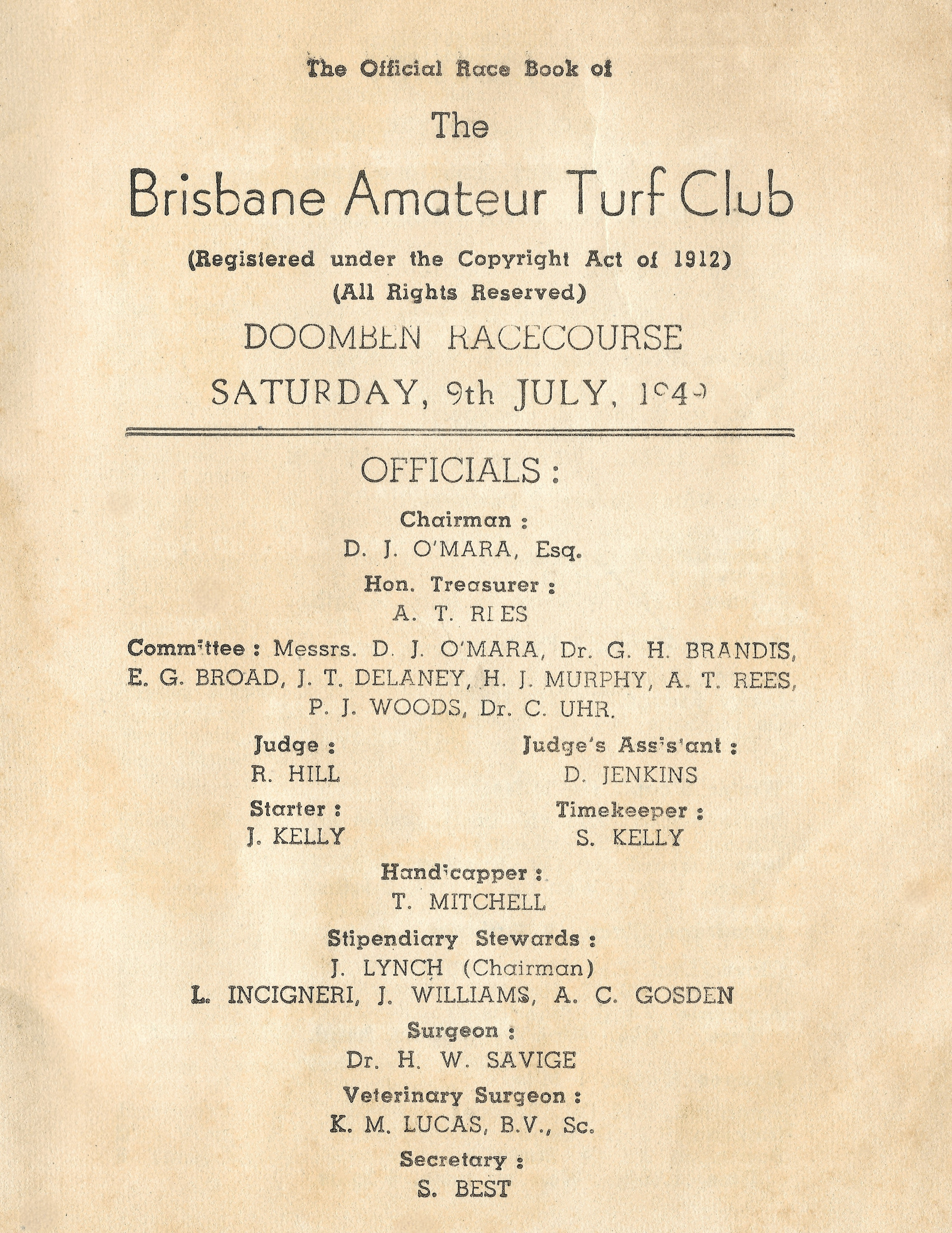
1949 BATC Doomben Cup showing raceday officials

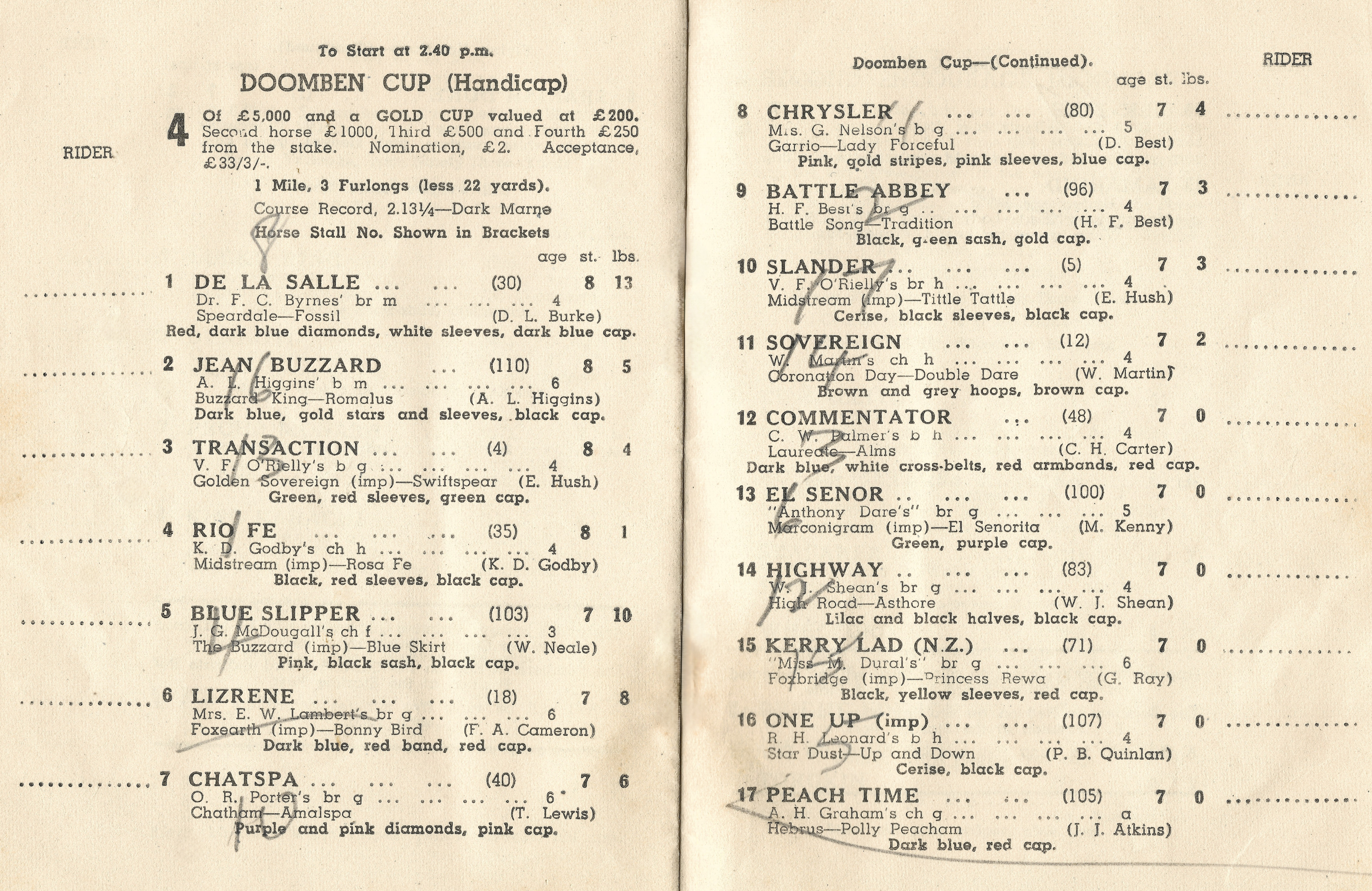
1949 BATC Doomben Cup showing the winner, Rio Fe

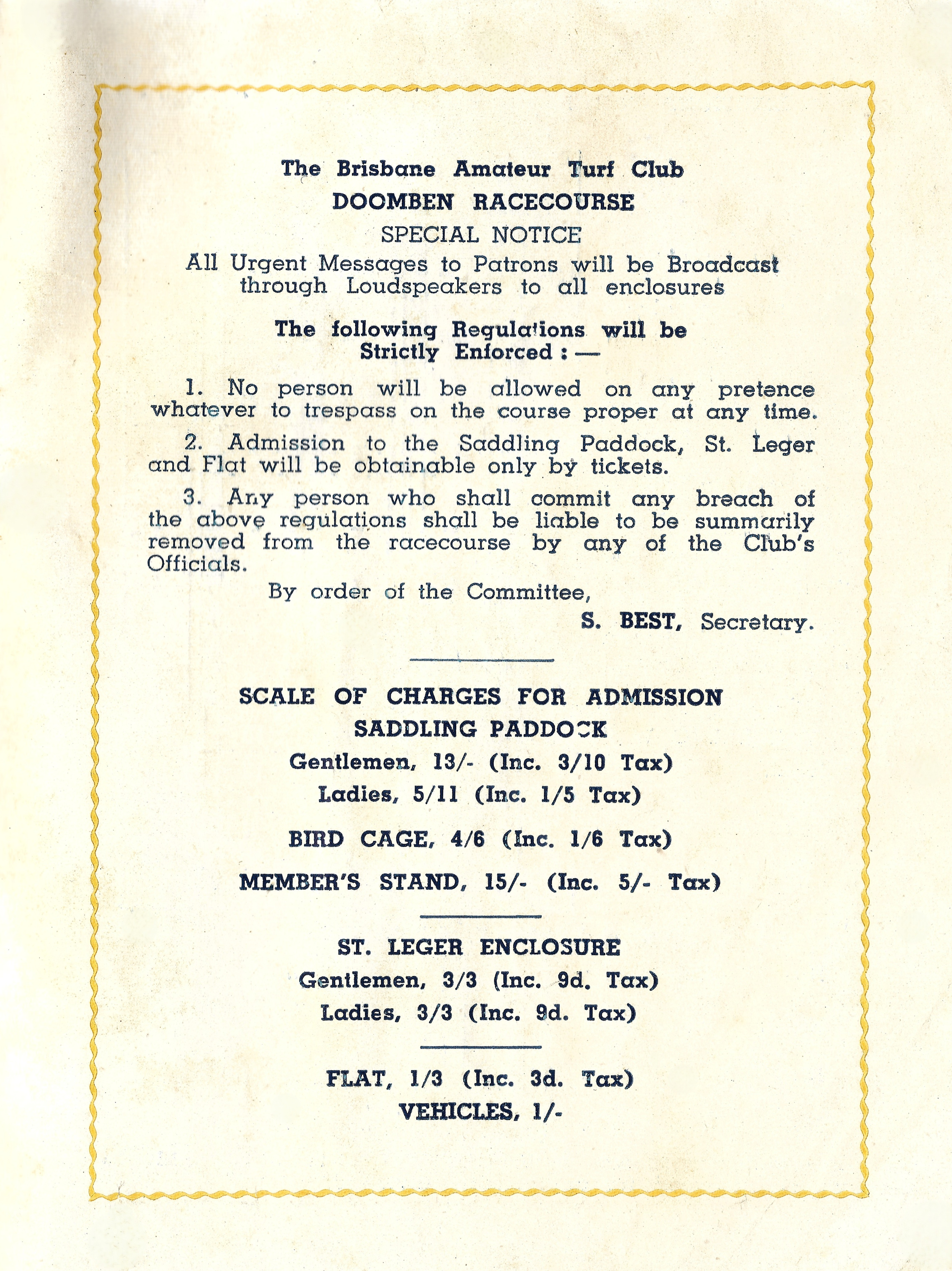
1949 BATC Doomben Cup showing urgent messages to patrons

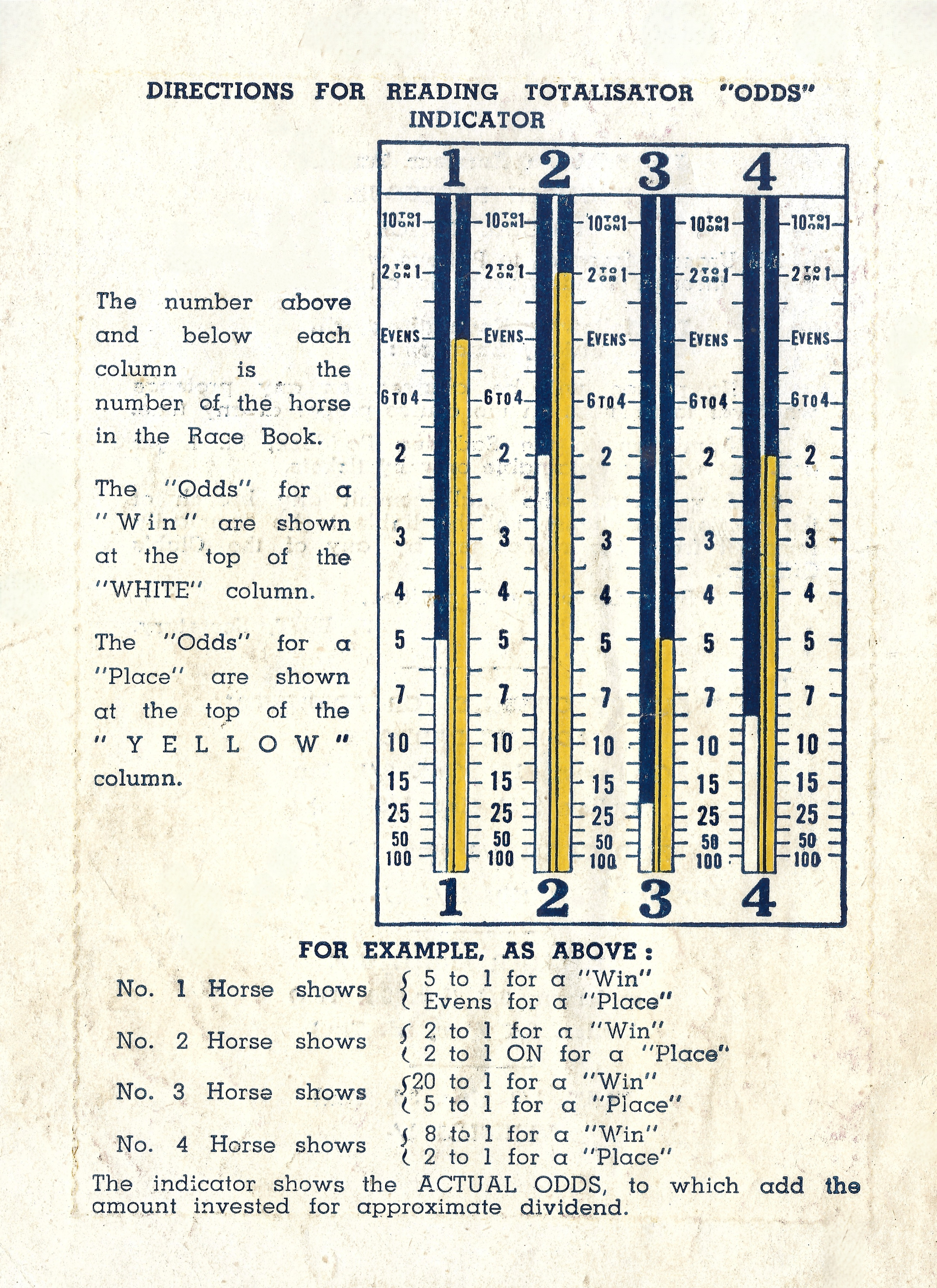
Back cover showing totalisator odds indicator

== Winners ==
The following are past winners of the race.

- 2026 - Birdman
- 2025 - Antino
- 2024 - Bois D'Argent
- 2023 - Huetor
- 2022 - Huetor
- 2021 - Zaaki
- 2020 - ‡race not held
- 2019 - Kenedna
- 2018 - Comin' Through
- 2017 - Sense Of Occasion
- 2016 - Our Ivanhowe
- 2015 - Pornichet
- 2014 - Streama
- 2013 - Beaten Up
- 2012 - Mawingo
- 2011 - Scenic Shot
- 2010 - Metal Bender
- 2009 - Scenic Shot
- 2008 - Sarrera
- 2007 - Cinque Cento
- 2006 - Above Deck
- 2005 - Perlin
- 2004 - Defier
- 2003 - Bush Padre
- 2002 - Mr. Bureaucrat
- 2001 - King Keitel
- 2000 - Akhenaton
- 1999 - Intergaze
- 1998 - Might and Power
- 1997 - Sapio
- 1996 - Juggler
- 1995 - Danewin
- 1994 - Durbridge
- 1993 - Rough Habit
- 1992 - Rough Habit
- 1991 - Rough Habit
- 1990 - Eye Of The Sky
- 1989 - Abstraction
- 1988 - Lord Hybrow
- 1987 - Dandy Andy
- 1986 - Les' Choice
- 1985 - Mr. Trick
- 1984 - Hussar's Command
- 1983 - Lord Seaman
- 1982 - Double You Em
- 1981 - Pelican Point
- 1980 - Golden Rhapsody
- 1979 - Waitangirua
- 1978 - Marceau
- 1977 - Grey Affair
- 1976 - Cheyne Walk
- 1975 - Golden Khan
- 1974 - Lord Ben
- 1973 - Lord Nelson
- 1972 - Knee High
- 1971 - Tails
- 1970 - Divide And Rule
- 1969 - Dual Control
- 1968 - Sandy's Hope
- 1967 - Bore Head
- 1966 - Winfreux
- 1965 - River Seine
- 1964 - Striking Force
- 1963 - Maspero
- 1962 - Samson
- 1961 - High Society
- 1960 - Earlwood
- 1959 - Earlwood
- 1958 - Book Link
- 1957 - Prince Delville
- 1956 - Fair Chance
- 1955 - Persian Link
- 1954 - Euphrates
- 1953 - French Echo
- 1952 - Tossing
- 1951 - Gay Felt
- 1950 - Dream
- 1949 - Rio Fe
- 1948 - Forge
- 1947 - Dark Marne
- 1946 - Bernborough
- 1945 - Repshot
- 1944 - Bahtheon
- 1943 - Qualeta
- 1942 - Wiseland
- 1941 - Lord Valentine
- 1940 - Beaulivre
- 1939 - Cooranga
- 1938 - Brown Lance
- 1937 - First Buzzard
- 1936 - Verdun
- 1935 - Serlodi
- 1934 - Whittingham
- 1933 - Pentheus

‡ Not held because of the COVID-19 pandemic

== See also ==
- BRC Sprint
- Doomben Roses
- Magic Millions Fillies & Mares Mile (Glenlogan Park Stakes)
- Stradbroke Handicap
- List of Australian Group races
- Group races
