= Doomben Roses =

The Roses registered as The Doomben Roses
- Class: Group 3
- Location: Doomben Racecourse; Brisbane, Australia
- Inaugurated: 1996
- Race type: Thoroughbred - Flat racing
- Sponsor: ANZ Bloodstock News (2021 & 2025)

Race information
- Distance: 2,000 metres
- Surface: Turf
- Track: Right-handed
- Qualification: Three year old fillies
- Weight: Set Weights - 56 1/2 kg.
- Purse: A$300,000 (2025)

The Roses, registered as The Doomben Roses, is a Brisbane Racing Club Group 3 Thoroughbred horse race for three-year-old filles, run under Set Weights conditions over a distance of 2000 metres at Doomben Racecourse, Brisbane, Australia during the Queensland Winter Racing Carnival.

== History ==
It is currently the main lead-up race for the Queensland Oaks.

The most notable winner of the race is 2001 winner Ethereal, who went on to win that year's Melbourne Cup. In winning the 2002 race, Palidamah set a new race record of 2:01.95 for the 2020 metre distance.

Two fillies have won the Doomben Roses–Queensland Oaks double:

- Ethereal (2001), who also won the 2001 Caulfield Cup and Melbourne Cup
- Scarlett Lady (2011).

Recent multiple winning trainers:

- Chris Waller (2018, 2021, 2024)
- Clarry Conners (2012 and 2013)
- Roger James (1998, 2006)
- Ciaron Maher (2019 with David Eustace and 2026)
- Graeme Rogerson (2009, 2011)
- David Vandyke (2014, 2025)

Jockeys have won the race twice:

- John Allen (2017, 2019)
- Greg Childs (2002, 2003)
- Darren Beadman (2006, 2007)
- James MMcDonald (2011, 2024)
- Kerrin McEvoy (2018, 2025)
- Blake Shinn (2014, 2015)
- Craig Williams (2021, 2022)

=== Name ===
- 1996–2009 - Doomben Roses
- 2010 onwards - The Roses

=== Grade ===
- 1996–2002 - Listed Race
- 2003 onwards - Group 3

=== Distance ===
- 1996 – 1625 metres
- 1997 – 1615 metres
- 1998–2011 – 2020 metres
- 2012–2014 – 2000 metres
- 2015 – 2020 metres
- 2016–2019 – 2000 metres
- 2020 – 1800 metres

=== Other venues ===
- 2020 - Eagle Farm Racecourse
- 2022 - Eagle Farm Racecourse

== Winners ==
The following are past winners of the race.

- 2026 - Fireball Miss
- 2025 - Philia
- 2024 - Scarlet Oak
- 2023 - Fireburn
- 2022 - Barb Raider
- 2021 - Only Words
- 2020 - Vanna Girl
- 2019 - Etana
- 2018 - Youngstar
- 2017 - Kenedna
- 2016 - Kebede
- 2015 - Bohemian Lily
- 2014 - Arabian Gold
- 2013 - Dear Demi
- 2012 - Invest
- 2011 - Scarlett Lady
- 2010 - Marheta
- 2009 - Awesome Planet
- 2008 - Heavenly Glow
- 2007 - Lasoron
- 2006 - Gaze
- 2005 - Cinque Cento
- 2004 - Natural Woman
- 2003 - The Jewel
- 2002 - Palidamah
- 2001 - Ethereal
- 2000 - Avilde
- 1999 - Episode
- 1998 - Melora
- 1997 - Queenstown Kate
- 1996 - Ballare

== See also ==
- BRC Sprint
- Doomben Cup
- Magic Millions Fillies & Mares Mile (Glenlogan Park Stakes)
- List of Australian Group races
- Group races
