= BRC Sprint =

- Class: Group 3
- Location: Doomben Racecourse; Brisbane, Australia
- Inaugurated: 1985
- Race type: Thoroughbred - Flat racing
- Sponsor: HKJC World Pool (2025)

Race information
- Distance: 1,350 metres
- Surface: Turf
- Track: Right-handed
- Weight: Quality handicap Maximum 61 kg Minimum 54 kg
- Purse: A$300,000 (2025)

The BRC Sprint is a Brisbane Racing Club Group 3 Thoroughbred open horse race run under Quality Handicap conditions over a distance of 1350 metres at Doomben Racecourse, Brisbane, Australia during the Queensland Winter Racing Carnival.

== History ==
=== Name ===
- 1985–1990 - BTC Sprint
- 1991–1995 - BATC Sprint
- 1996–2009 - BTC Sprint
- 2010 onwards - BRC Sprint

=== Grade ===
- 1985–1995 - Listed Race
- 1996 onwards - Group 3

=== Distance ===
- 1985–2019 – 1350 metres
- 2020 – 1200 metres
- 2022 - 1300 metres

=== Recent multiple winners ===
Trainers

- Walter Doolan (1990, 1991)
- Ben, Will & JD Hayes (2024, 2025)
- Robert Heathcote (2011, 2026)
- John Morish (1999, 2000)
- Paul Snowden (2015, 2016)

Jockeys

- Blake Shinn (2015, 2016, 2019 and 2025)
- Larry Cassidy (1993, 1995)
- Tim Clark (2007, 2026)
- John Hutchings (1990, 1991)

=== Race record ===
The race record for the usual 1350 metre journey is held by Chief De Beers in 1998 in 1:17.50. Chief De Beers recorded all his twenty victories on the Doomben race track.

== Winners ==
The following are past winners of the race.

- 2026 - Abounding
- 2025 - War Machine
- 2024 - Here To Shock
- 2023 - Surf Dancer
- 2022 - Soxagon
- 2021 - Emerald Kingdom
- 2020 - Tambo's Mate
- 2019 - Tyzone
- 2018 - I'm A Rippa
- 2017 - Jungle Edge
- 2016 - Snippets Land
- 2015 - Charlie Boy
- 2014 - River Lad
- 2013 - Belltone
- 2012 - Tiger Tees
- 2011 - Woorim
- 2010 - Beaded
- 2009 - Court Command
- 2008 - Helideck
- 2007 - Friday Creek
- 2006 - Hard To Catch
- 2005 - Ballet Society
- 2004 - True Glo
- 2003 - Emission
- 2002 - Carael Boy
- 2001 - Zarta
- 2000 - Pleasure Giver
- 1999 - Pleasure Giver
- 1998 - Chief De Beers
- 1997 - Poetic King
- 1996 - Taos
- 1995 - Cohort
- 1994 - Simonstad
- 1993 - Kenfair
- 1992 - Barrosa Boy
- 1991 - Tiny's Finto
- 1990 - Tiny's Finto
- 1989 - Count Henri
- 1988 - Lots Of Rule
- 1987 - Catering King
- 1986 - High Signal
- 1985 - Final Affair

== See also ==
- Doomben Cup
- Doomben Roses
- Magic Millions Fillies & Mares Mile (Glenlogan Park Stakes)
- Doomben 10,000
- List of Australian Group races
- Group races
