= Srikandi =

Australian-bred Thoroughbred racehorse

- Sire: Dubawi
- Grandsire: Dubai Millennium
- Dam: Raining
- Damsire: Hurricane Sky
- Sex: Mare
- Foaled: 10 October 2010
- Country: Australia
- Colour: Chestnut
- Owner: T A Mobbs P Tsimiklis T Mcgrath J M Bridges J Bridges A J Sinclair S Gillespie S Loughnan D J H Anderson D S Purvis Ms A Purvis W Stapleton L Lamude & C Ntzounas
- Trainer: Ciaron Maher
- Record: 15-9-2-1
- Earnings: A$2,377,900

Major wins
- Glenlogan Park Stakes (G3)(2014); Victory Stakes (G2)(2015); Stradbroke Handicap (G1)(2015); Tattersall's Tiara (G1)(2015)

Srikandi (foaled 10 October 2010) is a retired Thoroughbred racehorse and broodmare trained in Australia. She won the Group 1 Stradbroke Handicap and Tattersall's Tiara. She won over two million dollars.

== Career ==
Ridden by Craig Williams, Srikandi had her first race on September 13 2013, winning by a length over the 1000 metre course.

After 3 trials early in 2014, and then a narrow loss at Moonee Valley, Srikandi had an easy win at Mornington. This was to be the first of five consecutive victories. On 3 May, she won her first listed race. Three weeks later, she won the Group 3 Glenlogan Park Stakes in a "dominant" performance. Jockey Glen Boss said, "I wanted to see how good she was today and she didn't disappoint me. Coming out of the gates she was looking to relax and I could've ridden her behind the others without any trouble at all which is great from a future viewpoint."

Owners then paid a $23,000 late entry fee to make Srikandi eligible for the Stradbroke Handicap, entering the race as the $4.50 favourite. She placed third behind River Lad and Temple of Boom.

Over the next nine months, Srikandi had no races and one trial. She returned to Queensland in April for the 2015 Winter Carnival. She won her first race, the Group 2 Victory Stakes, besting the two horses that had beaten her in the previous year's Stradbroke. Trainer Maher said, "After a long break you put a nice foundation on them and hope they're right and she's a lot heavier mare than what she was last year round. It's just great to kick off with a win."

After two failures in May, including bungling the start of the BTC Cup, Srikandi won her first Group 1, the $2 million Stradbroke Handicap, in May. With regular jockey Damian Browne unable to make the weight, Srikandi was ridden by Kerrin McEvoy.

A fortnight later, Srikandi won her second Group 1 in the Tattersall's Tiara, her third victory on the Gold Coast without loss. Despite a wide barrier, Srikandi controlled the tempo throughout the race after a good start, and won by a length. Maher said, "She was really sharp from the barrier. That was the key to the race. Kerrin McEvoy, super ride again."

Srikandi returned to Victoria after a spell, with two races during the 2015 Spring Carnival. Her best result was a 2nd behind Chautauqua in the Manikato Stakes.

Stress-fractures stopped her from racing in 2016, and in August she was retired to breeding. She finished her career as the highest-earning female out of Dubawi in the world.
