= Brisbane Racing Club =

- Industry: Thoroughbred Racing & Events
- Founded: 2009 merger of the QTC and BTC
- Headquarters: Brisbane, Australia
- Key people: Karl deKroo, CEO
- Products: Doomben Racecourse, Eagle Farm Racecourse, Wagering, Wedding Venue, Corporate Functions, Restaurants, The Society
- Website: www.brc.com.au

The Brisbane Racing Club (BRC) is an Australian horse racing organization based in Brisbane in the state of Queensland. The head office of the club is located at 230 Lancaster Road in Ascot.

== History ==
The Brisbane Racing Club was founded on 1 July 2009 by a merger of the Queensland Turf Club and the Brisbane Turf Club (BTC). The club conducted 98 race meetings in 2012. The consolidation of the race clubs was the first of its kind in Australia as later other metropolitan race clubs would follow their initiative.

== Courses ==
The courses operated by the BRC are Eagle Farm Racecourse and Doomben Racecourse.

== Major races ==
The highlight on the Brisbane Racing Clubs racing calendar is the Brisbane Racing Carnival, run across five consecutive Saturdays in May and June. The highlights include the Doomben 10,000 and the AAMI Stradbroke Handicap.

Grp	Race Name	Age	Sex	Weight	Distance	Date	Course
1	BTC Cup	Open	Open	wfa	1200	May	Doomben
1	Doomben Cup	Open	Open	wfa	2200	May	Doomben
1	Doomben 10,000	Open	Open	wfa	1350	May	Doomben
2	Champagne Classic	2YO	Open	sw	1200	May	Doomben
3	BTC Sprint	Open	Open	hcp	1350	May	Doomben
3	BTC Chairman's Handicap	Open	Open	hcp	2000	May	Doomben
3	The Roses	3YO	Fillies	sw	2000	May	Doomben
3	Fred Best Classic	3YO	Open	sw	1350	May	Doomben
3	Gunsynd Mile	3YO	Open	sw	1600	May	Doomben
3	Lord Mayor's Cup	Open	Open	wfa	1600	May	Doomben
3	Premier's Cup	Open	Open	hcp	2200	May	Doomben
3	Rough Habit Plate	3YO	Open	sw	2000	May	Doomben
3	George Moore Stakes	Open	Open	hcp	1200	December	Doomben
1	Queensland Derby	3YO	Open	sw	2400	June	Eagle Farm
1	Queensland Oaks	3YO	Fillies	sw	2400	June	Eagle Farm
1	Stradbroke Handicap	Open	Open	hcp	1400	June	Eagle Farm
1	The T J Smith	2YO	Open	hcp	1600	June	Eagle Farm
2	Brisbane Cup	Open	Open	hcp	2400	June	Eagle Farm
2	P J O'Shea Stakes	Open	Open	wfa	2400	June	Eagle Farm
2	QTC Cup	Open	Open	hcp	1300	June	Eagle Farm
2	QTC Sires Produce Stakes	2YO	Open	sw	1400	June	Eagle Farm
2	Queensland Guineas	3YO	Open	sw	1600	June	Eagle Farm
2	Sir Byrne Hart Stakes	Open	Open	wfa	1200	May	Eagle Farm
3	Dane Ripper Quality	Open	F&M	qlty	1400	June	Eagle Farm
3	Grand Prix Stakes	3YO	Open	hcp	2100	June	Eagle Farm
3	Queen's Cup	Open	Open	hcp	3200	July	Eagle Farm
