= Queensland Turf Club =

The Queensland Turf Club (QTC) was founded in August 1863.

It began on a piece of land in Ascot, Queensland, later called Eagle Farm Racecourse, given to the club by government grant. The first meeting of the club was held on 14 August 1865.

Some of the major races staged today by the QTC are the Brisbane Cup, Queensland Derby, The QTC Cup, The T. J. Smith handicap, The Sires produce, and Queensland's greatest race the Stradbroke Handicap.

Some other races held at the QTC are the Sir Edward Williams handicap, P. O'Shea stakes, Peter Gallagher, Sir Byrne Hart stakes.

On 1 July 2009, the Queensland Turf Club merged with the Brisbane Turf Club (BTC) to form the Brisbane Racing Club (BRC); the BTC had run until then the nearby Doomben Racecourse.

Past chairmen of the QTC include Sir Edward Williams, Sir Byrne Hart and Mr. P. Gallagher.
