= Doomben Racecourse =

Horse racing venue in Brisbane, Queensland, Australia

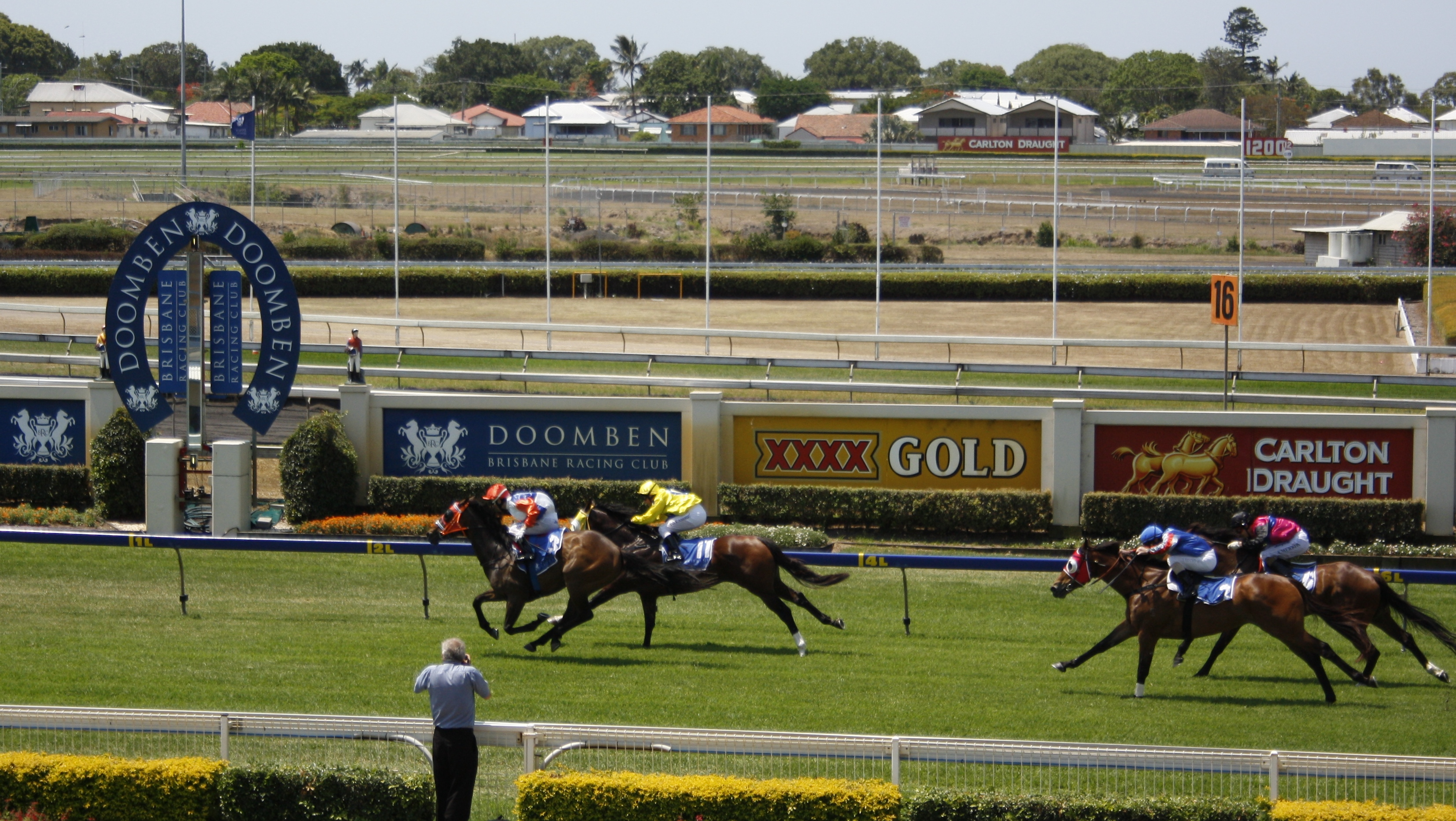
- Interactive map of Doomben Racecourse
- Location: Ascot, Queensland
- Coordinates: 27°25′34.75″S 153°4′33.72″E
- Owned by: Brisbane Racing Club
- Date opened: 1933
- Race type: Flat racing
- Course type: Oval, kikuyu turf track
- Notable races: Doomben 10,000; Doomben Cup; BTC Cup

Doomben Racecourse is a horse racing venue in Brisbane, Queensland, Australia. It is located in the suburb of Ascot, 7 kilometres north of the Brisbane central business district. The Doomben course neighbours another thoroughbred venue called the Eagle Farm Racecourse and can be accessed via car, train or bus. Together with Eagle Farm, these courses are considered the two major racecourses in South East Queensland, and can be seen sharing irrigation systems and some of Brisbane Racings feature events.

This racecourse underwent its last major reconstruction in 1996, which primarily included major changes to the racing turf and its surrounding structures. Doomben Racecourse is currently owned and operated by the Brisbane Racing Club, following various past acquisitions and mergers between competing racing organisations in Brisbane. Since its establishment in 1933 and its first race being conducted that same year, the land of Doomben Racecourse has been passed between crown title, purchasing syndicates and registered racing organisations and had been subject to the effects of World War II between the years 1941 and 1945.

Since this time, Doomben racecourse has hosted many major Australian races, including three group 1 races, these being the Doomben 10,000, the BTC Cup, and the Doomben Cup.

== Location ==
Doomben Racecourse is located in the middle of four roads, these being; Raceview Ave (to the North), Hampden St (to the South), Southern Cross Way (to the east), and Nudgee Rd (to the West), with the entrance to the venue being located on Hampden Street. Positioned in the North-East corner of Brisbane's suburb of Ascot, this race course sits adjacent to another Race course called Eagle Farm. The two courses lie within a half a kilometre of each other and are separated by Nudgee Road with Doomben to its East and Eagle Farm to its West. Due to previous competition between the two Racecourses, Nudgee Road has often been referred to as the "Gaza Strip", to symbolise the historical rivalry between the two venues.

=== Transport ===
Transport to and from the course can be found in the form of trains, busses, taxis as well as the ability to drive yourself. Via the train, Doomben racecourse can be accessed from the Doomben Railway station, which is part of the Pinkenba line and lies only a 5-minute walk (Approximately 400m) from the course's entrance. Busses can be used to reach the venue on the 301 route, which runs from Adelaide St in the city to numerous stops surrounding the course. The two stops which are located closest to the main entry and members' entry at gate 4 include stops 29 (Hampden St at St Ledger) and 30 (Hampden St at Hopetoun Street). Taxi transportation can be found on Hampton Street out front of gate 4 from the specified taxi rank. If attendants are driving to the venue themselves, public parking can be located using gates 1 and 2 along Nudgee Rd which leads to the infield carpark. Members parking, however, can be found using gate 5 on Hampden Street along with disabled parking availability.

== Course details ==
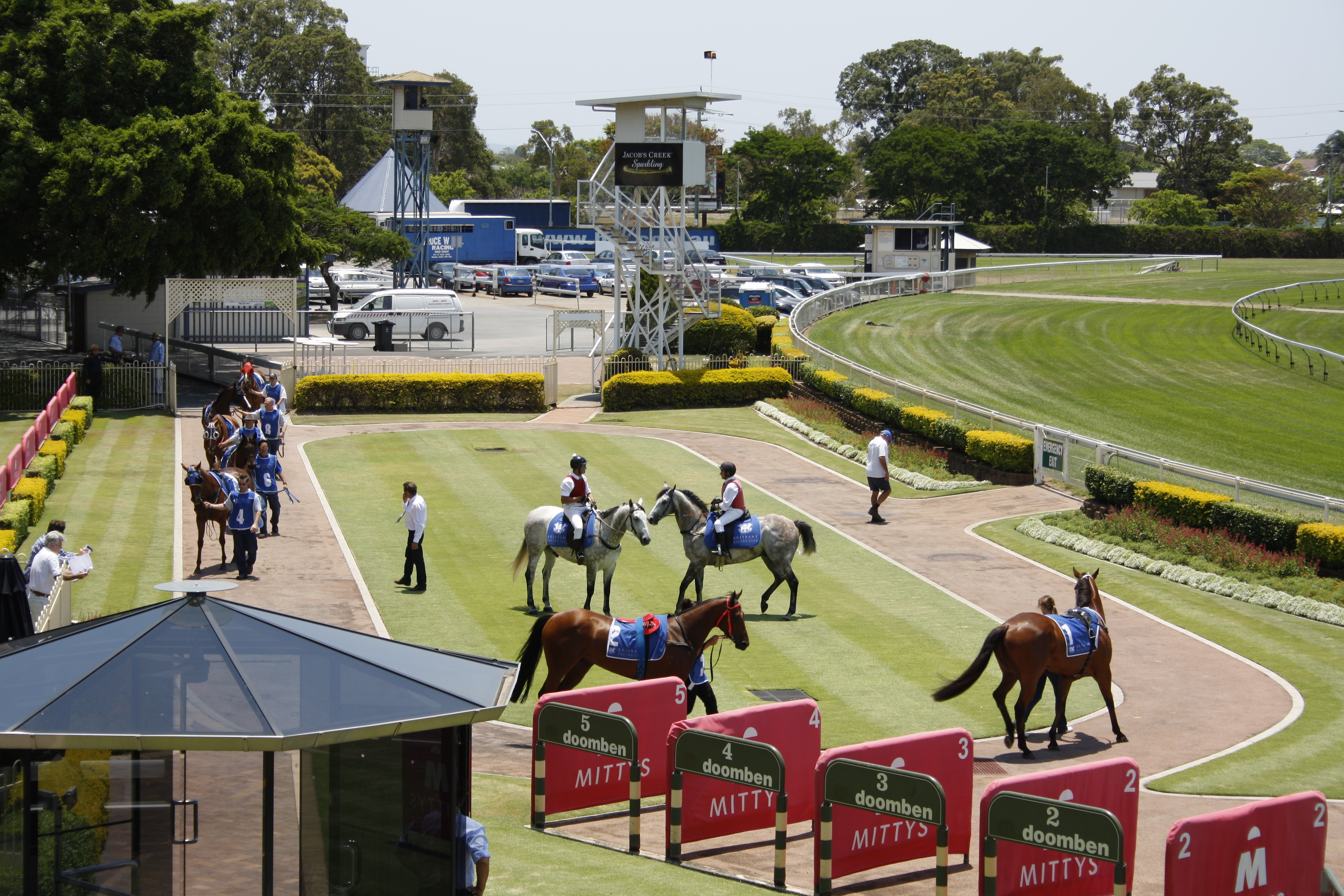
Pre-race mounting yard

The Doomben race track completed its last major reconstruction in December 1996 at a total budget of $3.3 million. With design inputs from Robert Bird and his partners, Basic Construction were able to perform these major works on the course, which included additions such as new irrigation systems, steward towers and rails as well as the replacement of the track turf and soil around the course. Due to these modifications to the venue, Doomben's course dimensions as of 2021 include a 27-metre wide racetrack, with a circumference of 1715 metres. The tracks front and back straights of the track are 320 metres in length with a 2% camber, however, the turns on the course are made more steep with a 5% camber. Doomben's entire racetrack is soiled with a kikuyu turf-type and all races conducted on it are run in a clockwise direction, similar to most racetracks in Australia.

Doomben racecourse also maintains a number of training tracks which lie in the infield of the main racetrack. From infield-out, the order of these tracks are; track 3, cinder track then track 2 with circumferences of 1550m, 1600m and 1650m respectively. Tracks 2 and 3 have an average width of 14m and 17m respectively, with both having the same kikuyu turf as the main racetrack.

=== Grandstand ===
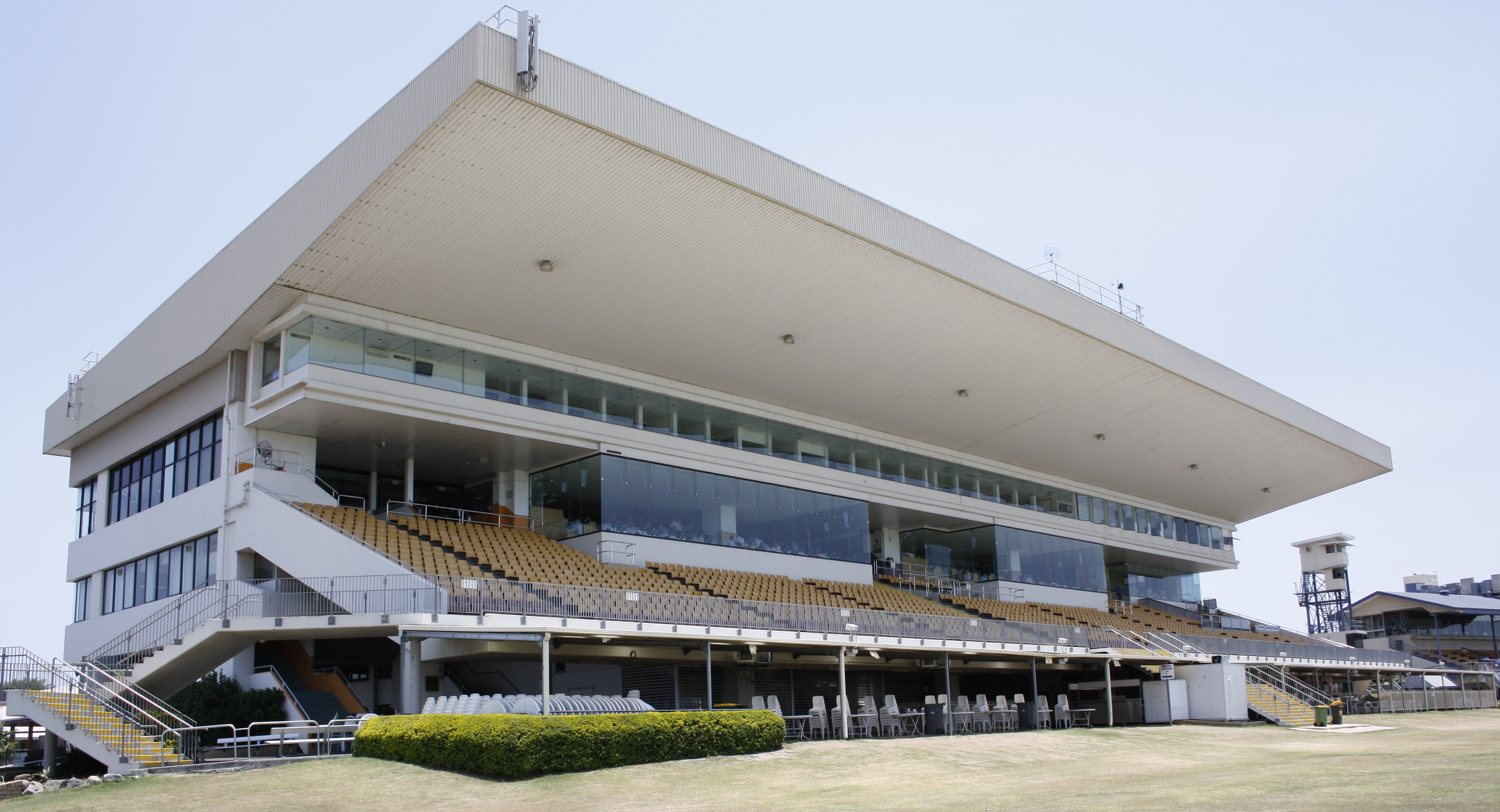
Main grandstand

Prior to the opening of Doomben racecourse, a grandstand was built by the Kell and Rigby construction company in 1932. Architecture services were provided by G.H.M. Addison and MacDonald with the contract price of the grandstand amounting to 23,344 pounds. Following this, new additions were made to the grandstand in 1982 costing a total of $8 million. As at 2021, this grandstand is split into a members stand and a public stand enclosing venues such as the Satchel, Chief De Beers, Vo Rogue, 10,000 and Home Return rooms which were last renovated in 2018.

=== Irrigation ===
In November 2019, Project Pumps & Irrigation completed the installation of a personally designed irrigation system for the two racecourses of Doomben and Eagle Farm. Since the major works were completed in December 1996, this installation was the first change made to the system, which involved an entire replacement of the old system followed by the integration of a centrally controlled automated system. The water source used for this new irrigation system is an 8 ML storage in the infield of Doomben racecourse, which is fed solely from an 18 ML storage dam on Eagle Farm racecourse, which is subsequently filled by stored runoff stormwater.

== History ==
Doomben racecourse is currently owned and operated by the Brisbane Racing Club (BRC), an entity which also owns and operates the neighbouring racecourse – Eagle Farm – which together, serve as the two most prominent Racecourses in South East Queensland. The BRC has operated within and between these two courses since the club's establishment in 2009, following a merger between two clubs; the Queensland Turf Club (QTC) and the Brisbane Turf Club (BTC). The QTC, prior to the merger, had operated out of Eagle Farm Racecourse since the club's first race meeting in August 1865, with the BTC operating solely from Doomben racecourse. Although the BTC has conducted race meetings at Doomben since the course's opening and inaugural race in 1933, the BTC was formally known as the Brisbane Amateur Turf Club (BATC) which was the club that the Doomben course officially opened under. This change in club name, from BATC to BTC, occurred in 1997 and remained up until the 2009 merger.

The idea for this merger had been building up throughout the 2000s, as well as the possibility to potentially close the Doomben course in its entirety. Firm motions in favour of the merger then arose in 2007 due to Queensland Racing stating that the individual clubs of the BTC and QTC could not continue operations separately. This was due to increasing competition between the two clubs, and the subsequent division of attendants, which decreased overall profits. Indicative of this rivalry was the BTC's loss of over $1,000,000 in 2008. Consequently, in July 2009, this merger became official and the BRC was formed.

=== Ownership of land ===
Historically, the vast majority of land in Brisbane, known as Meanjin, has been occupied by the Turrbal clan, together with the Jagera people. First records, following colonisation, indicate that the land on which Doomben racecourse stands was property of The Crown up until October 1915 when it was purchased by a syndicate in recognition of its suitability to become a registered racecourse. In 1919, these 55.38 hectares of land were then purchased by Doomben Park Recreation Grounds Limited at a cost of 30,000 pounds. Over this time modifications were made to the property by both the syndicate and purchasing company, in order to prepare it for registered race meetings. These modifications included additions of fences, horse stables, starting lanes and a saddling paddock as well as the formation of a grass racing track with a 6-furlong straight. In 1930, the Royal Commission recommended that the Doomben land be sold or leased to an established racing club in order to facilitate registered racing, which was subsequently enacted and resulted in the BATC purchasing the land in 1933.

=== World War II ===
From 1933 onwards, Doomben racecourse conducted numerous race meetings up until 1941, in which an attack on Pearl Harbor in WWII resulted in American Military Forces being moved from Hawaii to Brisbane's suburb of Hamilton. From here, the American troops proceeded to occupy a vast majority of Brisbane suburbs, which included camps Doomben and Ascot, established respectively at both Doomben and Eagle Farm racecourse. These two camps, separated only by Nudgee road, were not enough to accommodate the approximate one million troops stationed in the suburb of Ascot between the years 1941 and 1945, and therefore an extension camp known as Camp Raceview was developed off of Camp Doomben, spanning North over Raceview Avenue. Over this period, Doomben racecourse's tracks, buildings and grandstands were all transformed into offices and accommodation to support the American Servicemen. This included modifications such as the infield of the course being covered by tents and the Members Stand being converted into an Australian Army Signals Office. The South-East extension that connects to the six furlong straight of Doomben racecourse was similarly converted into an apron for aircraft and hangars which lie in the Eagle Farm aerodrome, adjacent to the course. This provided access for the American troops to load, unload, refuel and board these aircraft. During this period of Military occupation on both racecourses, the weekly Saturday races of both clubs were moved to Albion park, which at the time was owned by the BATC, allowing for an easy transition.

== Races ==
The first registered race meeting at Doomben racecourse was held on Saturday, 20 May 1933. This consisted of seven races throughout the day, with the main race, Doomben Newmarket Handicap, hosting 17 New South Wales horses to partake in the sprint event. This race was the first straight six furlongs sprint to be held in Queensland, which resulted in a close win from Wollun over the favorite, Closing Time.

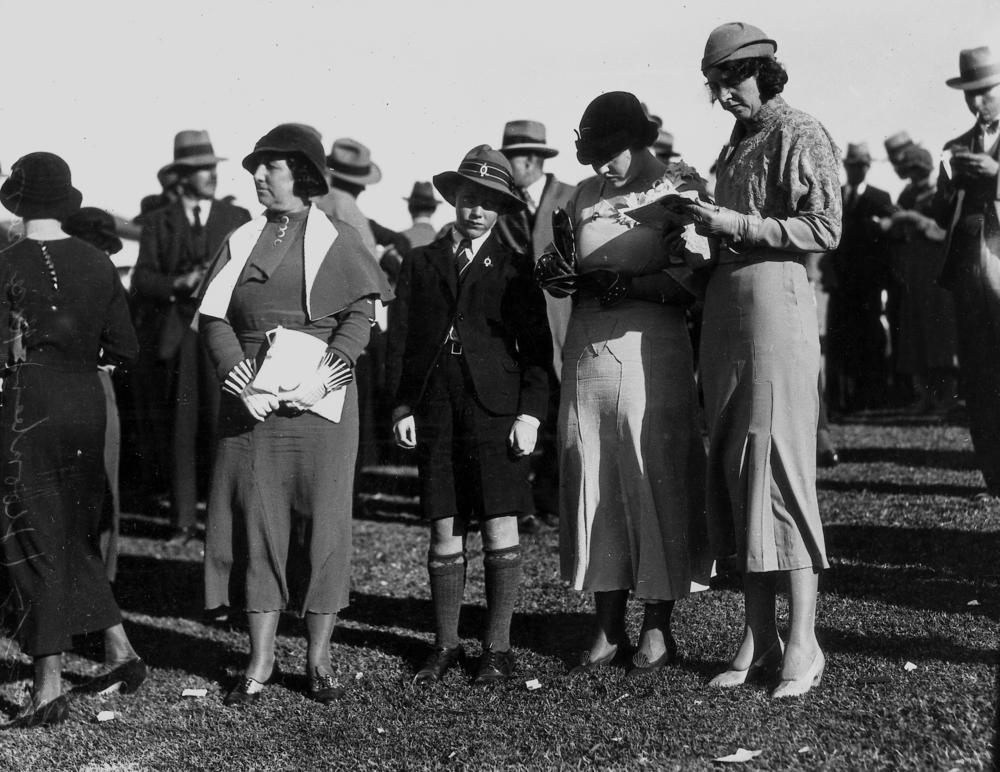
20 May 1933, Opening race at Doomben

Since 1933, Doomben racecourse has gone on to host a number of notable races under the ownership of the BTC and BRC which have been shared between the Eagle Farm and Doomben courses each year. The most significant of these races held at Doomben are the Group 1 events, which consist of the Doomben 10,000, the BTC Cup, and the Doomben Cup.

=== Doomben 10,000 ===
Doomben 10,000 is a 1200m event, formerly known as the Doomben Newmarket Handicap which was first run on the day of the course's opening in 1933. After the Pacific war ended and military camps were removed from Doomben, the race became known as the Doomben 10,000 following the reopening of the course on June 1, 1946, in which the prize was increased to 10,000 pound. This made Doomben 10,000 the richest sprint race in Australia at the time, however, the total prize pool for the race in 2021 sits at $1,000,000.

=== BTC Cup ===
The BTC Cup originated in 1964 at Doomben racecourse under the name of the J. T. Delaney Quality Handicap, in which Rashlore was the first recorded winner. From 1964 onwards the BTC Cup was solely raced at Doomben up until 2013, in which the race was run at neighbouring racecourse, Eagle Farm, for the first time. The BTC Cup then continued to race at Doomben again until 2017, in which the race was permanently changed to Eagle Farm, the cup name was changed to the Kingsford-Smith Cup, and the race was extended from 1200m to 1300m.

=== Doomben Cup ===
The Doomben cup was first run on Saturday, 27 May 1933, one week after the opening of Doomben racecourse. This inaugural race was won by Pentheus, over 17 other horses including favourite Wollun, following its Doomben 10,000 win one week prior. At the time, the prize of this race was 1,000 pound and a gold cup worth 150 pound, however, this has increased to $650,000 as of 2021 and is still raced at Doomben racecourse.

The following is a list of Group races which are run at Doomben Racecourse.

Grp	Race Name	Age	Sex	Weight	Distance	Date
1	BTC Cup	Open	Open	wfa	1200	May
1	Doomben Cup	Open	Open	wfa	2000	May
1	Doomben 10,000	Open	Open	wfa	1350	May
2	Champagne Classic	2YO	Open	sw	1200	May
3	BTC Sprint	Open	Open	hcp	1350	May
3	BTC Chairman's Handicap	Open	Open	hcp	2020	May
3	Doomben Roses	3YO	Fillies	sw	2020	May
3	Fred Best Classic	3YO	Open	sw	1350	May
3	Gunsynd Mile	3YO	Open	sw	1600	May
3	Lord Mayor's Cup	Open	Open	wfa	1615	May
3	Premier's Cup	Open	Open	hcp	2200	May
3	Rough Habit Plate	3YO	Open	sw	2020	May
3	George Moore Stakes	Open	Open	hcp	1200	December
