= Atkins (surname) =

Atkins is a surname of English origin. At the time of the British Census of 1881, its frequency was highest in Buckinghamshire (6.0 times the British average), followed by Huntingdonshire, Leicestershire, Warwickshire, Rutland, Kent, Dorset, Norfolk, and Berkshire.

== Art and entertainment ==
- Al Atkins (born 1947), British singer
- Anna Atkins (1799–1871), British pioneer of photography
- Chet Atkins (1924–2001), American guitarist and record producer
- Cholly Atkins (1913–2003), American choreographer for Motown artists
- Christopher Atkins (born 1961), American actor
- Coral Atkins (1936–2016), British actress
- David Atkins (born 1955), Australian stage director
- Eileen Atkins (born 1934), English actress
- Emma Atkins (born 1975), English actress
- Essence Atkins (born 1972), American actress
- Finn Atkins (born 1989), English actress
- Ivor Atkins (1869–1953), Welsh choirmaster
- Jeffrey Atkins (born 1976), American rapper Ja Rule
- Juan Atkins (1962–2026), American techno musician
- Lexi Atkins (born 1993), American actress, model and beauty pageant titleholder
- Lucy Atkins, British author
- Mark Atkins, Australian didgeridoo player
- Martin Atkins (born 1959), British drummer
- Michael Atkins (1747–1812), Irish actor and theatre manager
- Nicole Atkins (born 1978), American singer-songwriter
- Oliver F. Atkins (1917–1977), American photographer
- Rodney Atkins (born 1969), country singer
- Sharif Atkins (born 1975), actor

== Military ==
- Barry K. Atkins (1911–2005), American admiral
- Tommy Atkins, World War I nickname for the iconic British soldier
- Travis Atkins (1975–2007), United States Army soldier; recipient of the Medal of Honor
- Vera Atkins (1908–2000), British intelligence officer

== Politics ==
- Charlotte Atkins (born 1950), United Kingdom Member of Parliament
- Colin Atkins, Canadian politician
- Humphrey Atkins (1922–1996), British politician
- Joe Atkins (born 1965), Minnesota State Representative
- Norman Atkins (1934–2010), Canadian politician
- Robert Atkins (politician) (born 1946), United Kingdom politician
- Ronald Atkins (1916–2020), British politician
- Toni Atkins (born 1962), American politician
- Victoria Atkins (born 1976), British Conservative Party politician, Member of Parliament (MP) for Louth and Horncastle since May 2015

== Sport ==
- Brett Atkins (born 1964), Australian rugby league footballer of the 1980s and 1990s
- Chucky Atkins (born 1974), NBA basketball player
- Doug Atkins (1930–2015), American football player
- Ernie Atkins (1890–1972), Australian Rules footballer
- Garrett Atkins (born 1979), American baseball player
- Gary Atkins (born 1969), rugby league footballer
- Geno Atkins (born 1988), NFL football player
- Ian Atkins (born 1957), English footballer
- John Atkins (American football) (born 1992), American football player
- Kelley Atkins (born 1966), Canadian curler Kelley Law
- Larry Atkins (born 1975), formerly of the Kansas City Chiefs
- Ross Atkins (born 1989), English footballer
- Ross Atkins (baseball) (born 1973), baseball executive
- William Atkins (architect) (1811–1887), Irish architect
- William Atkins (footballer) (born 1939), former professional footballer
- Xavier Atkins (born 2005), American football player

== Other ==
- Amy Atkins, American journalist and academic
- B. T. S. Atkins (Sue Atkins) (1931–2021), British lexicographer
- C. Clyde Atkins (1914–1999), American judge
- Craig S. Atkins (1903–1990), judge of the United States Tax Court
- Ella Atkins, American aerospace engineer
- Frances Atkins, British chef
- George Atkins (disambiguation)
- Henry Atkins (disambiguation)
- John F. Atkins, Irish scientist
- Madeleine Atkins CBE, British academic
- Peter Atkins (born 1940), professor of chemistry and author
- Robert Atkins (nutritionist) (1930–2003), physician noted for the Atkins Nutritional Approach (Atkins Diet)
- Ros Atkins, BBC News presenter
- Ruth Atkins (1911–1984), Australian political scientist
- Simon Green Atkins (1863–1934), American educator and founder of Winston-Salem State University
- Stephen E. Atkins (1941–2010), American librarian and author
- Susan Atkins (1948–2009), Manson family member
- Tom Atkins (disambiguation)

== Fictional characters ==
- Alfie Atkins, main character in the Swedish children's books series with the same name
- Maddison Atkins, popular character from the lonelygirl15 alternate reality game
- Marmalade Atkins, fictional character from Thames Television
- State Comptroller Atkins, public official of the unnamed home state of The Simpsons

== See also ==
- Atkins (disambiguation)
- Adkins
