= Richard Atkins =

Richard Atkins may refer to:

- Richard Atkins (martyr) (1559–1581), English Protestant martyr
- Sir Richard Atkins, 1st Baronet (c. 1615–1689), of the Atkins baronets
- Sir Richard Atkins, 2nd Baronet (1654–1696), English politician
- Sir Richard Atkins, 6th Baronet (1728–1756), High Sheriff of Buckinghamshire
- Richard Atkins (diplomat) (1931–1998), New Zealand public servant and diplomat
- Sir Richard Atkins (educational administrator), British teacher and principal
- Dick Atkins, American racing driver
- Richie Atkins, fictional character in TV series Bad Girls

== See also ==
- Richard Atkyns (1615–1677), English writer
