= Atkins =

Atkins may refer to:

== People ==
- Atkins (surname)

== Places in the United States ==
- Atkins, Arkansas, a city
- Atkins, Iowa, a city
- Atkins, an unincorporated community in Bossier Parish, Louisiana
- Atkins, Nebraska, an unincorporated community
- Atkins, Virginia, a census-designated place
- Atkins, Wisconsin, an unincorporated community
- Atkins Peak, in Yellowstone National Park

== Other uses ==
- Atkins Nutritional Approach, known as the Atkins diet
- Atkins Nutritionals, a producer of low-carbohydrate packaged foods
- Atkins (company), the largest engineering consultancy firm in the United Kingdom
- Atkins baronets, in the Baronetage of England
- Atkins High School (North Carolina), Winston-Salem, North Carolina, on the National Register of Historic Places
- Atkins v. Virginia, a case in which the United States Supreme Court ruled that executing individuals with intellectual disabilities violates the Eighth Amendment's ban on cruel and unusual punishments
- J. J. Atkins, a thoroughbred horse race for two-year-olds held in Brisbane, Australia

== See also ==
- Adkins
