= Gunsynd Classic =

Thoroughbred horse race in Australia

- Class: Group 3
- Location: Eagle Farm Racecourse, Brisbane, Australia
- Inaugurated: 1989
- Race type: Thoroughbred - Flat racing
- Sponsor: Sky Racing (2024 - 2026)

Race information
- Distance: 1,600 metres
- Surface: Turf
- Track: Right-handed
- Qualification: Three year old
- Weight: Set weights
- Purse: A$200,000 (2026)

The Gunsynd Classic is a Brisbane Racing Club Group 3 Thoroughbred horse race for horses aged three years old, at set weights, over a distance of 1,600 metres, at Eagle Farm Racecourse, Brisbane, Australia during the Queensland Winter Racing Carnival.

== History ==
The race is named in honour of Gunsynd, the champion miler of the early 1970s known as the Goondiwindi Grey.

=== Name ===
- 1989–2009 – Doomben Classic
- 2010 onwards - Gunsynd Classic

=== Grade ===
- Before 1996 - Listed race
- 1997 onwards - Group 3

=== Distance ===
- 1989–1999 – 1615 metres
- 2000 – 1640 metres
- 2001–2009 – 1615 metres
- 2010–2014 – 1600 metres
- 2015 – 1800 metres
- 2016 – 1630 metres
- 2017 – 1600 metres
- 2018 – 1630 metres
- 2019 – 1600 metres
- 2020 – 1800 metres
- 2021 – 1600 metres

=== Venue ===
- 1997–2013 - Doomben Racecourse
- 2014 - Eagle Farm Racecourse
- 2015 - Gold Coast Racecourse
- 2016 - Doomben Racecourse
- 2017 - Eagle Farm Racecourse
- 2018 - Doomben Racecourse
- 2019 onwards - Eagle Farm Racecourse

== Winners ==
The following are past winners of the race.

- 2025 - Just Feelin' Lucky
- 2024 - Bases Loaded
- 2023 - Rediener
- 2022 - Kiss Sum
- 2021 - Ayrton
- 2020 - Supergiant
- 2019 - Gem Song
- 2018 - Villermont
- 2017 - Dreams Aplenty
- 2016 - Cylinder Beach
- 2015 - Worthy Cause
- 2014 - Hopfgarten
- 2013 - Proverb
- 2012 - Meeting abandoned
- 2011 - Chateau Fort
- 2010 - Sanderson
- 2009 - Za Magic
- 2008 - Pepperwood
- 2007 - Reigning To Win
- 2006 - Belmonte
- 2005 - Saxon
- 2004 - Drunken Joker
- 2003 - Bobs Boy
- 2002 - Galroof
- 2001 - Arrabeea
- 2000 - Akhenaton
- 1999 - Tobruk
- 1998 - Enforced
- 1997 - Marble Halls
- 1996 - Kidmans Cove
- 1995 - Matsqui
- 1994 - What A Poet
- 1993 - Slanchyvah
- 1992 - Pagos King
- 1991 - Brunchtime
- 1990 - Stylish Century
- 1989 - Swain

== See also ==
- Brisbane Cup
- Dane Ripper Stakes
- J. J. Atkins
- Queensland Derby
- Queensland Guineas
- Queensland Oaks
- Stradbroke Handicap
- The Q22 (Eagle Farm Cup / P J O'Shea Stakes)
- List of Australian Group races
- Group races
