= Henry Atkins =

Henry Atkins may refer to:

- Henry Atkins (designer) (1867–1923), designer and co-founder of the San Francisco, California art gallery Vickery, Atkins & Torrey
- Henry Atkins (physician) (1558–1635), English physician
- Henry Atkins, the fictional US Postmaster General character in Seinfeld in the episode "The Junk Mail"
- Sir Henry Atkins, 3rd Baronet (1684–1712) of the Atkins baronets
- Sir Henry Atkins, 4th Baronet (1707–1728) of the Atkins baronets
- Sir Henry Atkins, 5th Baronet (1726–1742) of the Atkins baronets
- Henry B. Atkins (1867–1941), member of the Legislative Assembly of Alberta
- Henry Ernest Atkins (1872–1955), British chess player
- Henry A. Atkins (1827–1885), American businessman and mayor of Seattle
- Henry Atkins (speedway rider) (born 2001), English speedway rider
