= Eagle Farm Cup =

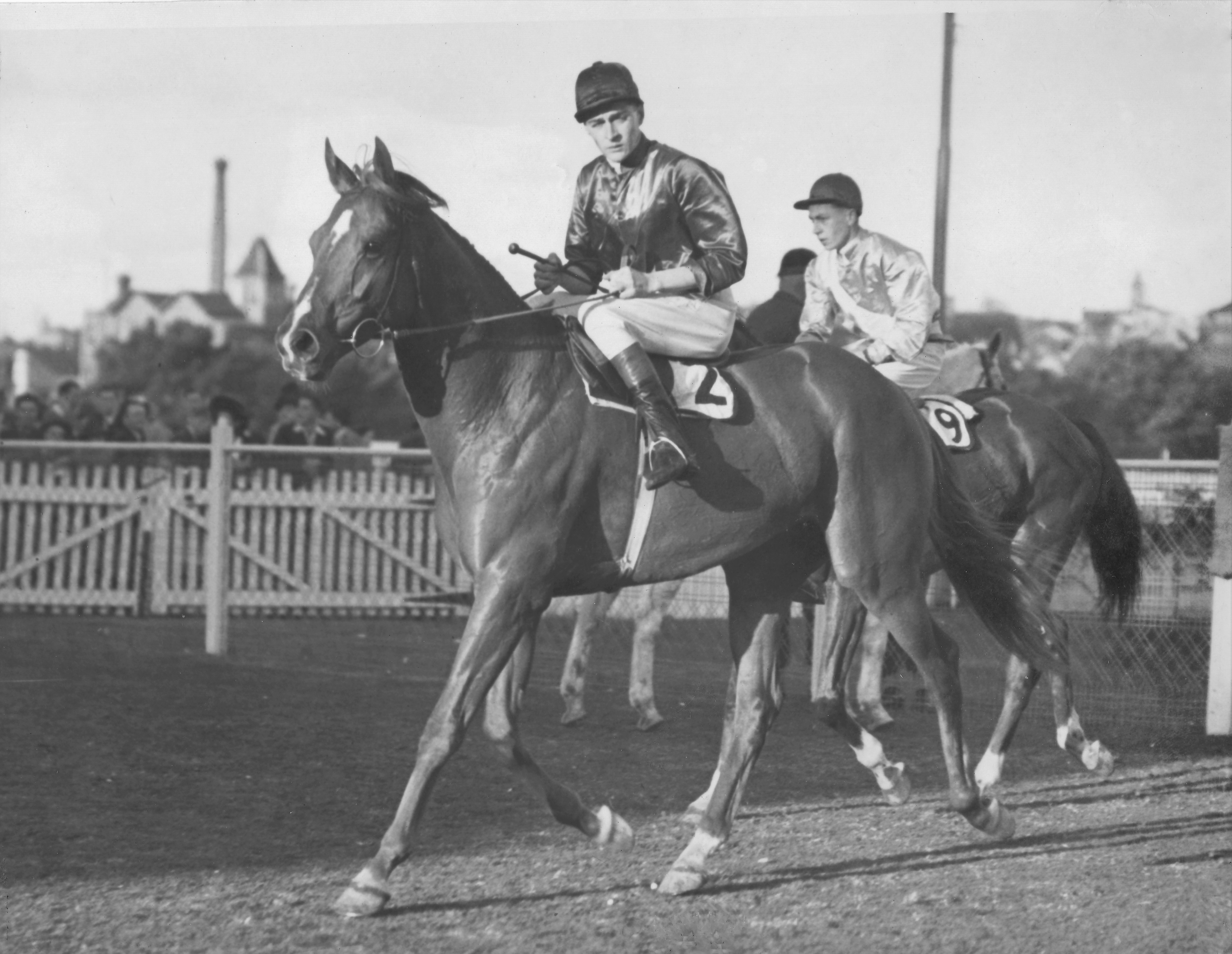
- Russia, 1947 winner
- Class: Group 2
- Location: Doomben Racecourse; Brisbane, Australia
- Inaugurated: 1947
- Race type: Thoroughbred - Flat racing
- Sponsor: HKJC World Pool (2024 - 2026)

Race information
- Distance: 2,200 metres
- Surface: Turf
- Track: Right-handed
- Qualification: Three years old and older
- Weight: Weight for age
- Purse: A$1,200,000 (2026)

The Q22, registered as the Eagle Farm Cup and previously the P. J. O’Shea Stakes is a Brisbane Racing Club Group 2 Thoroughbred horse race held under weight for age conditions, for horses aged three years old and upwards, over a distance of 2,200 metres at Doomben Racecourse, Brisbane, Australia during the Queensland Winter Racing Carnival.

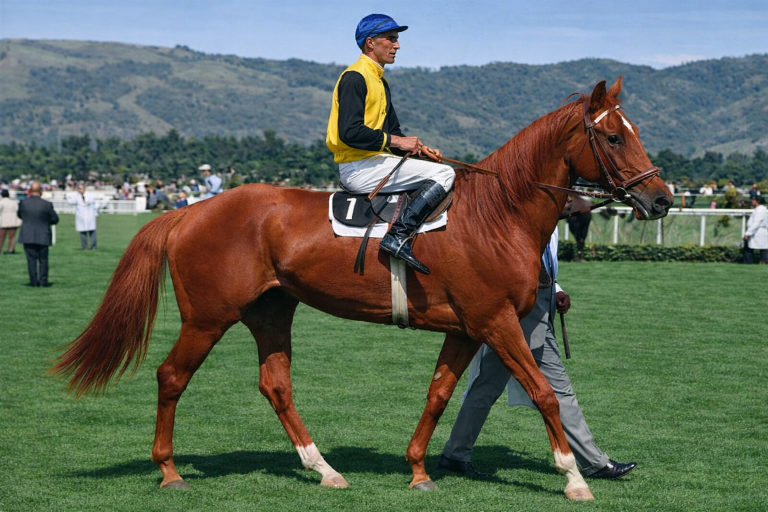
Redcraze, 1957 winner

== History ==
The inaugural running of the race as the P.J. O'Shea Stakes was in 1947. The race was named after Patrick O'Shea, the Queensland Turf Club's treasurer in the early 1900s and raced horses in Brisbane for 35 years.

The race used to be considered a major leadup race to the Brisbane Cup, however it is now raced on the same day as that race. This race now has greater stake money than the Cup.

=== Name ===
- 1947–1971 - P. J. O'Shea Stakes
- 1972 - Sir Winston Churchill Stakes
- 1973–2009 - P. J. O'Shea Stakes
- 2010–2016 - Eagle Farm Cup
- 2017–2019 - P. J. O'Shea Stakes
- 2021 onwards - Q22

=== Distance ===
- 1947–1956 - 1 1/4 miles
- 1957 - 1 1/2 miles
- 1958–1968 - 1 mile 2 1/2 furlongs
- 1969–1972 - 1 3/8 miles
- 1973–1982 – 2200 metres
- 1983 – 2232 metres
- 1984 – 2200 metres
- 1985–2006 – 2400 metres
- 2007 onwards - 2200 metres

=== Grade ===
- 1947–1978 - Principal race
- 1979 onwards - Group 2 race

=== Venue ===
Due to track reconstruction of Eagle Farm Racecourse for the 2014–15 racing season the event was transferred to Doomben Racecourse. With the poor state of the Eagle Farm Racecourse in 2017 this race and the Queensland Oaks again moved to Doomben Racecourse. In 2018 the meeting was moved to the Sunshine Coast.

- 2015, 2017, 2019 - Doomben Racecourse
- 2018 - Corbould Park Racecourse

=== 1951 racebook ===
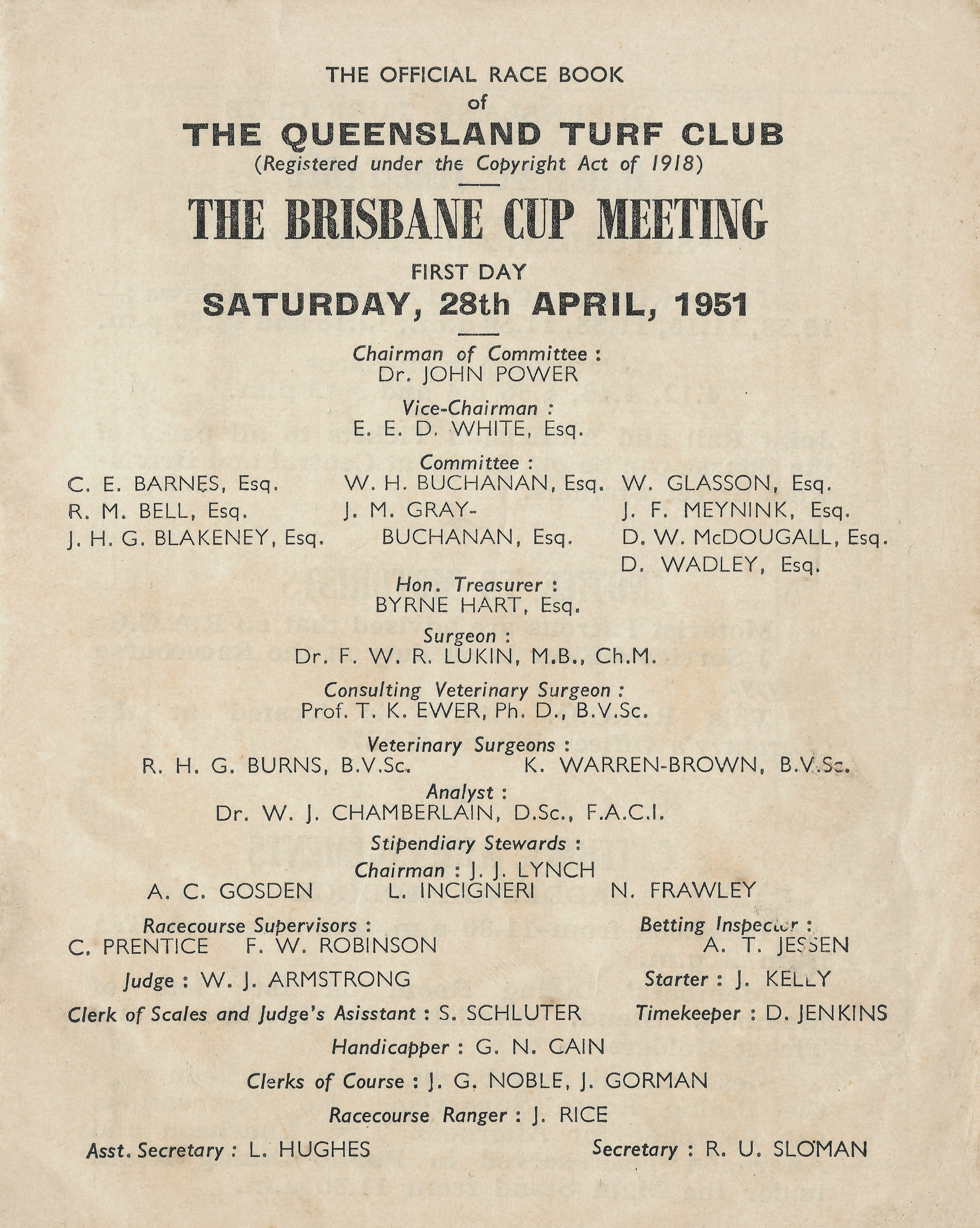
1951 QTC Stradbroke Handicap showing raceday officials

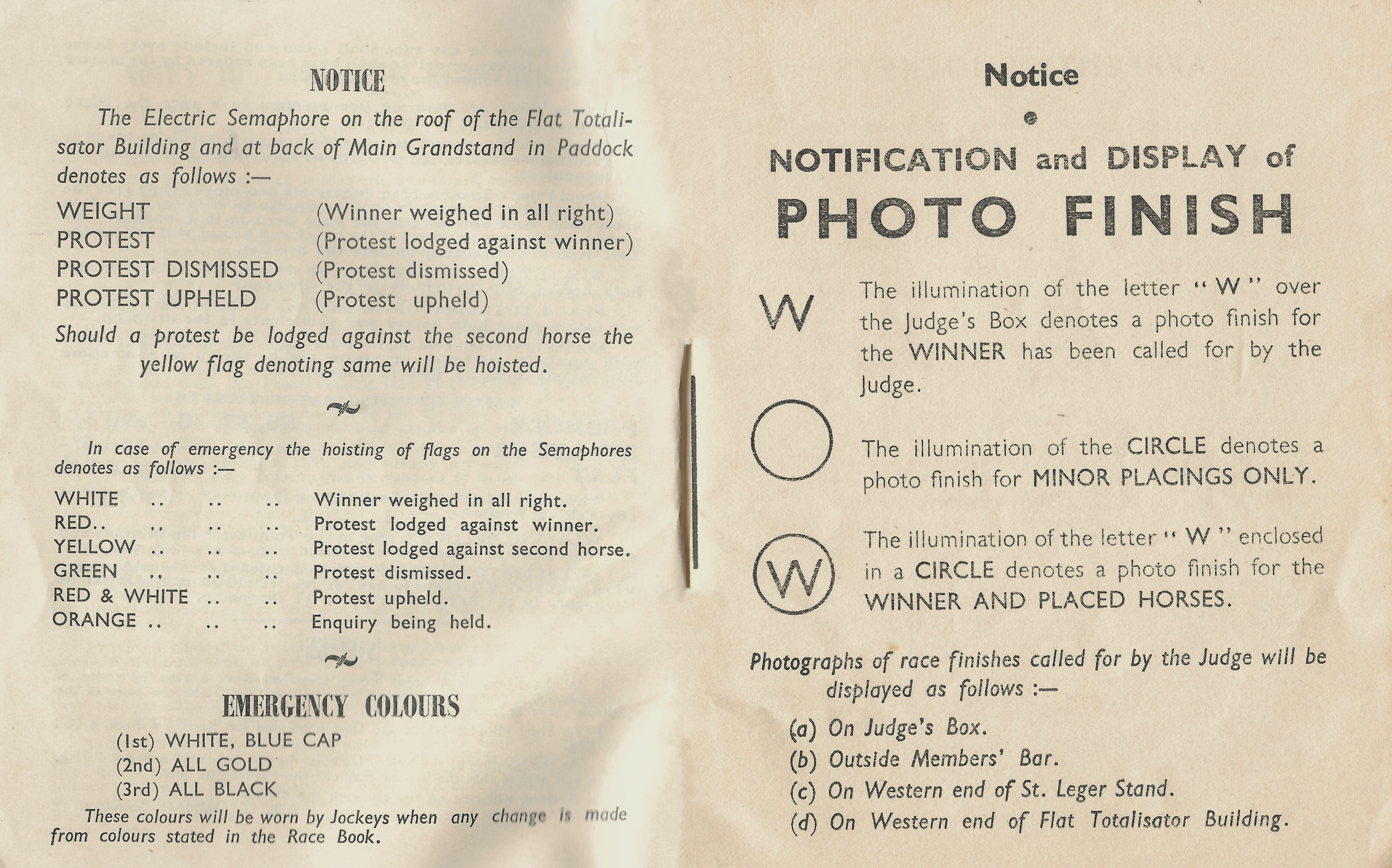
1951 QTC Stradbroke Handicap showing raceday notices

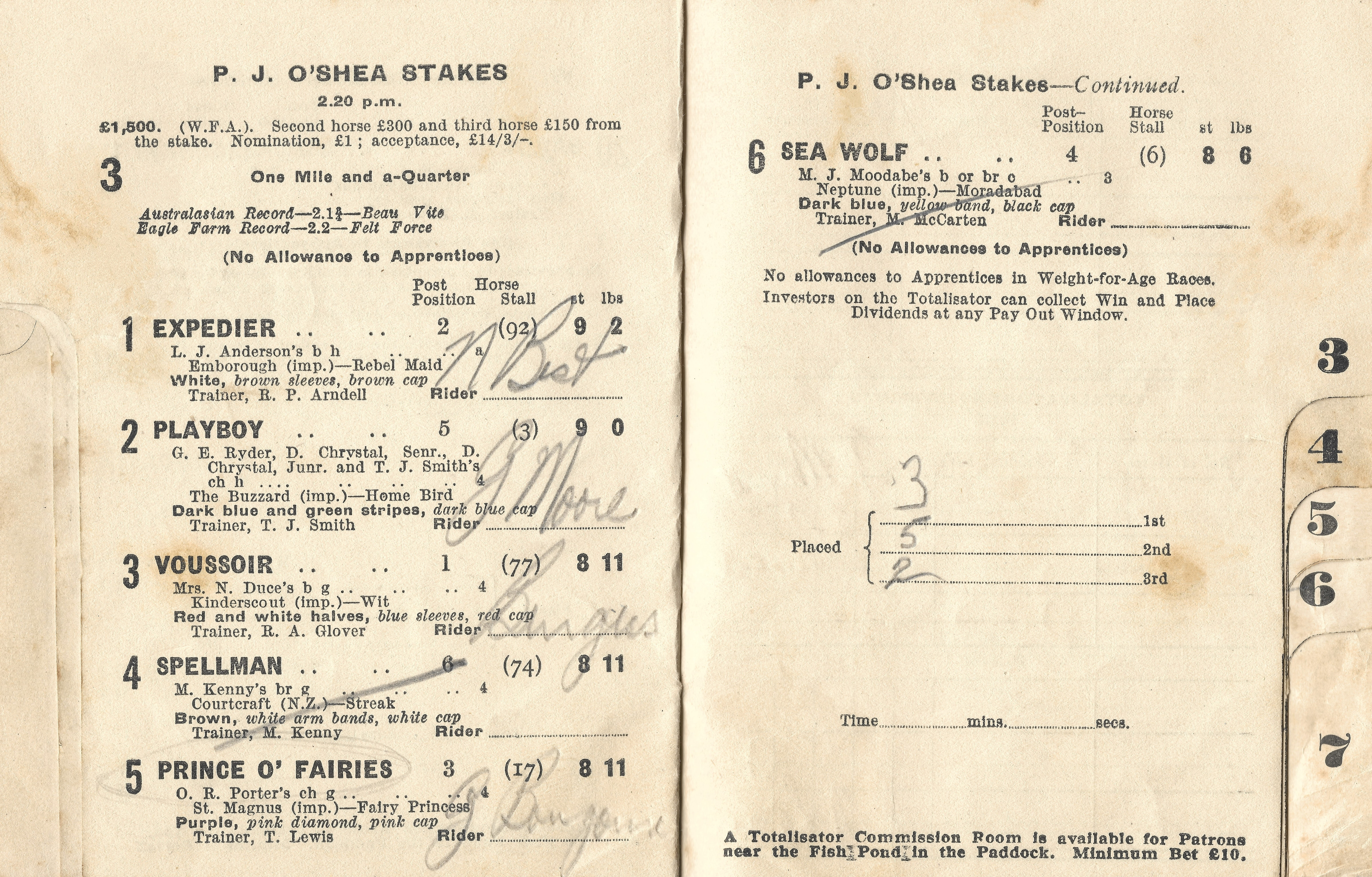
1951 QTC P.J. O'Shea Stakes page showing the winner, Voussoir

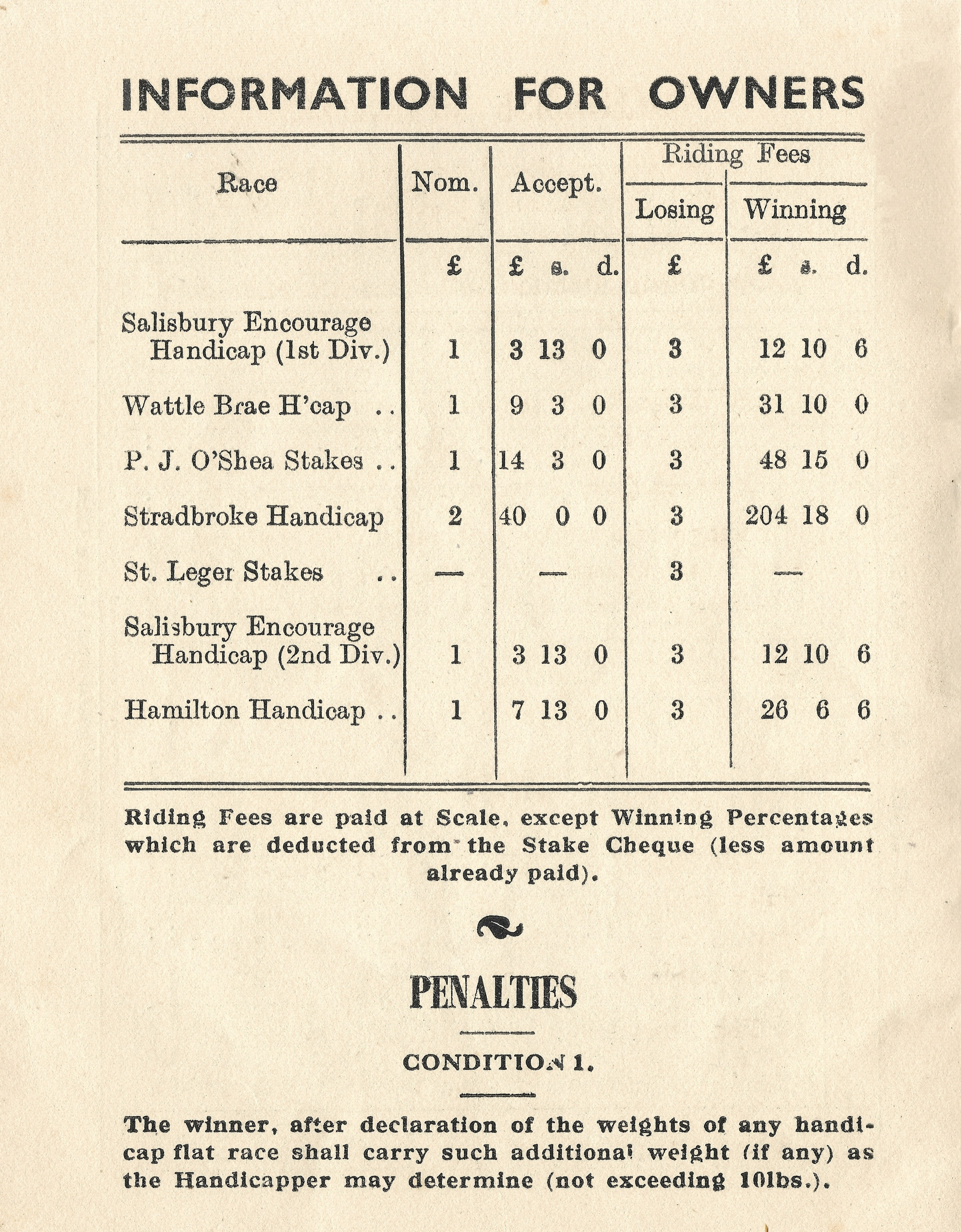
1951 QTC Stradbroke Handicap showing information notices for owners

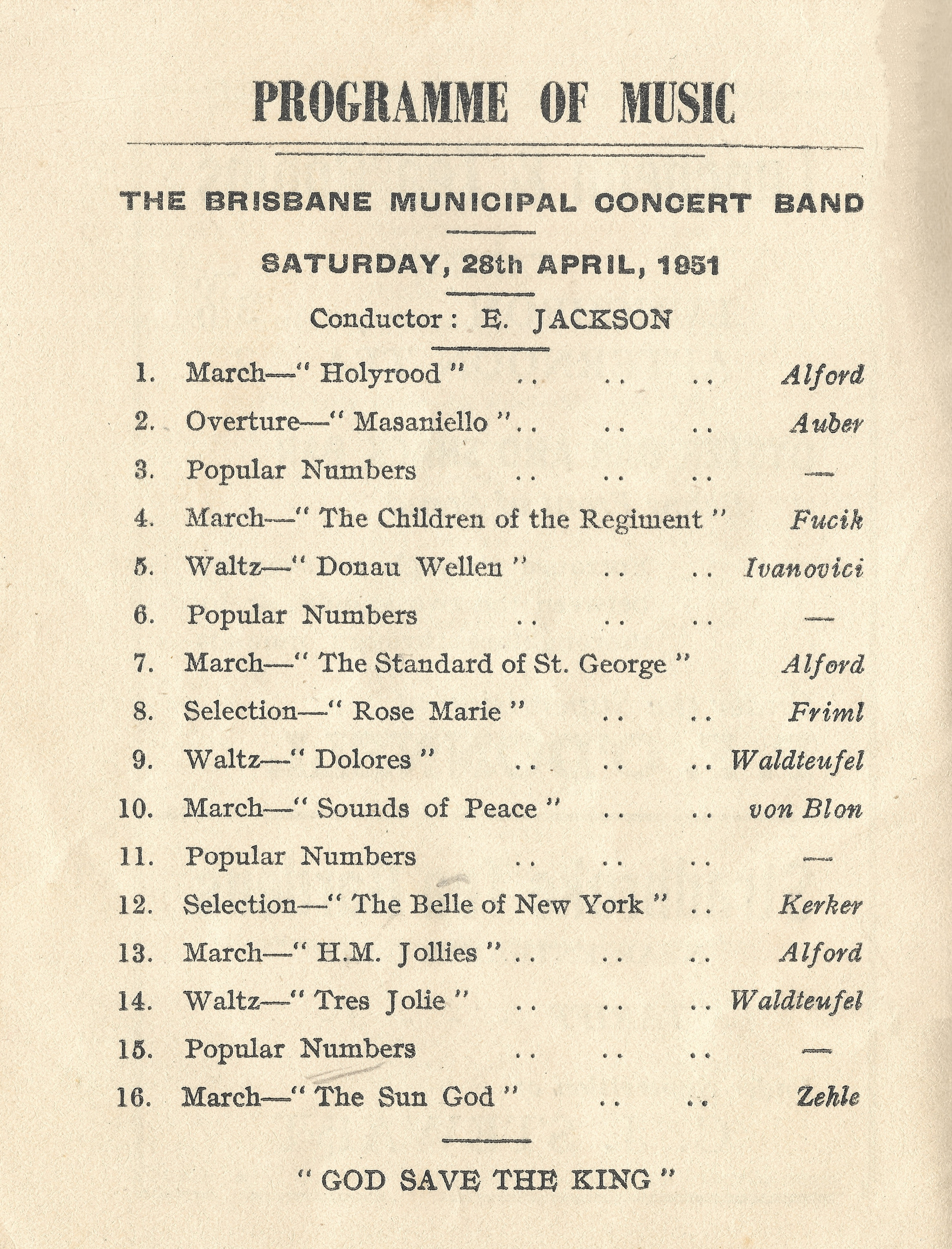
1951 QTC Stradbroke Handicap showing raceday programme of music

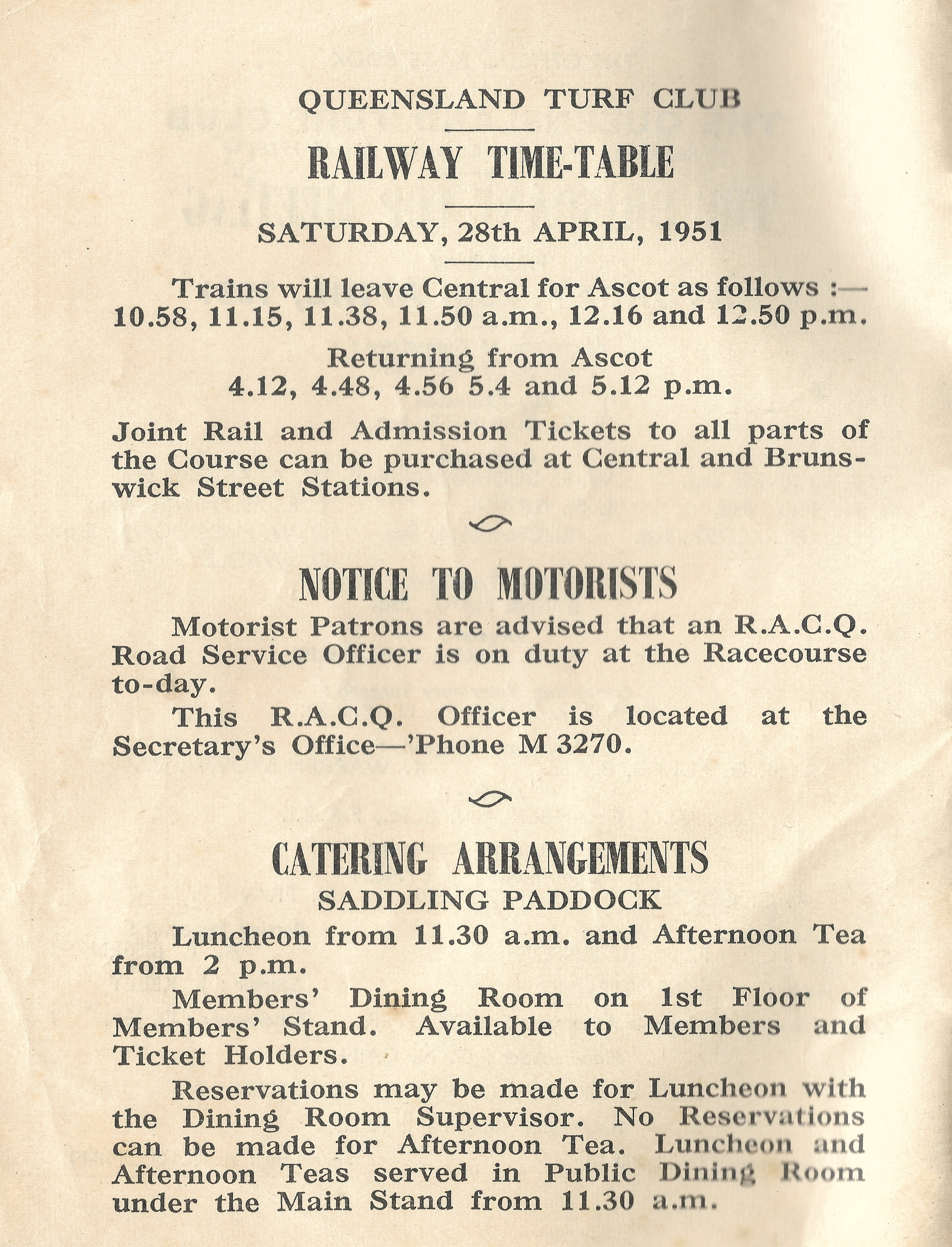
Back cover showing railway and catering arrangements

== Winners ==
The following are past winners of the race.

- 2026 - Royal Supremacy
- 2025 - Kovalica
- 2024 - Fawkner Park
- 2023 - Without A Fight
- 2022 - Numerian
- 2021 - Zaaki
- 2020 - Race not held
- 2019 - Kenedna
- 2018 - Egg Tart
- 2017 - Single Gaze
- 2016 - Race not held^{(1)}
- 2015 - Werther
- 2014 - Moriarty
- 2013 - Quintessential
- 2012 - Lights Of Heaven
- 2011 - Glass Harmonium
- 2010 - Triple Honour
- 2009 - Scenic Shot
- 2008 - Scenic Shot
- 2007 - Pentathon
- 2006 - Mahtoum
- 2005 - Natural Blitz
- 2004 - Pentastic
- 2003 - Maguire
- 2002 - Hey Pronto
- 2001 - Yippyio
- 2000 - Ken's Joy
- 1999 - Sharscay
- 1998 - Intergaze
- 1997 - Pakaraka Star
- 1996 - The Phantom Chance
- 1995 - Rough Habit
- 1994 - Full Suit
- 1993 - Dark Ksar
- 1992 - Mountain Rule
- 1991 - Magnolia Hall/Spring Thaw^{(2)}
- 1990 - Shuzohra
- 1989 - Card Shark
- 1988 - Lord Hybrow
- 1987 - Our Silver Elm
- 1986 - Rising Fear
- 1985 - Our Boyfriend
- 1984 - Godarchi
- 1983 - Prince Majestic
- 1982 - Shamrock
- 1981 - Four Crowns
- 1980 - Iko
- 1979 - Belmura Lad
- 1978 - Tod Bay
- 1977 - Ngawyni
- 1976 - Balmerino
- 1975 - Nourishing
- 1974 - Passetreul
- 1973 - Baghdad Note
- 1972 - Tails
- 1971 - Bluelough
- 1970 - Roman Consul
- 1969 - Roman Consul
- 1968 - Swift Peter
- 1967 - Striking Force
- 1966 - Striking Force
- 1965 - Fair Patton
- 1964 - Count Radiant
- 1963 - Oakland
- 1962 - Rural Loch
- 1961 - Tulloch
- 1960 - Tulloch
- 1959 - Caesar
- 1958 - Sailor's Guide
- 1957 - Redcraze
- 1956 - Redcraze
- 1955 - Surprise Ending
- 1954 - Gallant Archer
- 1953 - Hydrogen
- 1952 - Spellman
- 1951 - Voussoir
- 1950 - Persist
- 1949 - Dark Marne
- 1948 - On Cor
- 1947 - Russia

Notes:

- ^(1) Race meeting scheduled for 4 June 2016 was abandoned due to Eagle Farm's course deemed unsafe for racing after early morning track inspection due to continuous overnight rain.
- ^(2) Dead heat
- Winners in italics that have won the P.J. O'Shea Stakes–Brisbane Cup double

== See also ==
- Brisbane Cup
- Dane Ripper Stakes
- Gunsynd Classic
- J. J. Atkins
- Stradbroke Handicap
- List of Australian Group races
- Group races
