= Brisbane Cup =

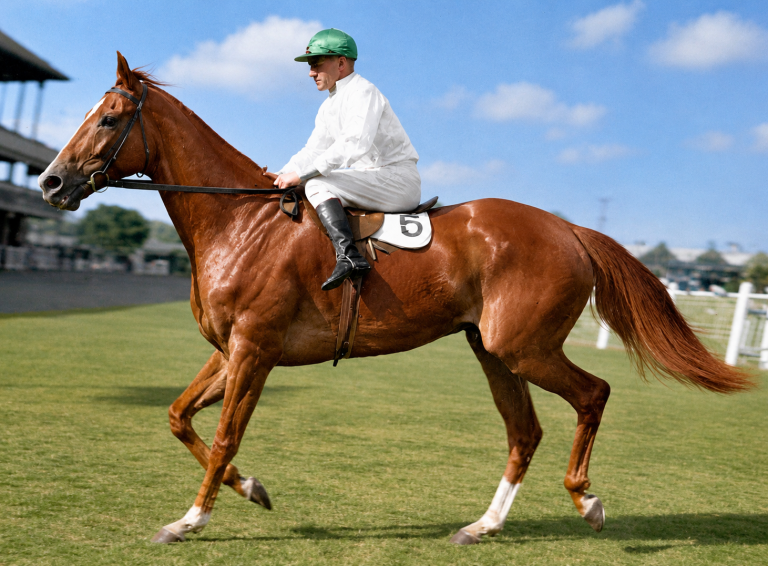
- Lough Neagh, 1936 winner
- Class: Group 2
- Location: Eagle Farm Racecourse; Brisbane, Australia
- Inaugurated: 1866
- Race type: Thoroughbred - Flat racing
- Sponsor: XXXX (2022-2026)

Race information
- Distance: 3,200 metres
- Surface: Turf
- Track: Right-handed
- Qualification: Three year old and older
- Weight: Quality handicap
- Purse: A$400,000 (2026)

The Brisbane Cup is a Brisbane Racing Club Group 2 Thoroughbred horse race for three-year-olds and upwards, run under handicap conditions at Eagle Farm Racecourse, Brisbane during the Queensland Winter Racing Carnival.

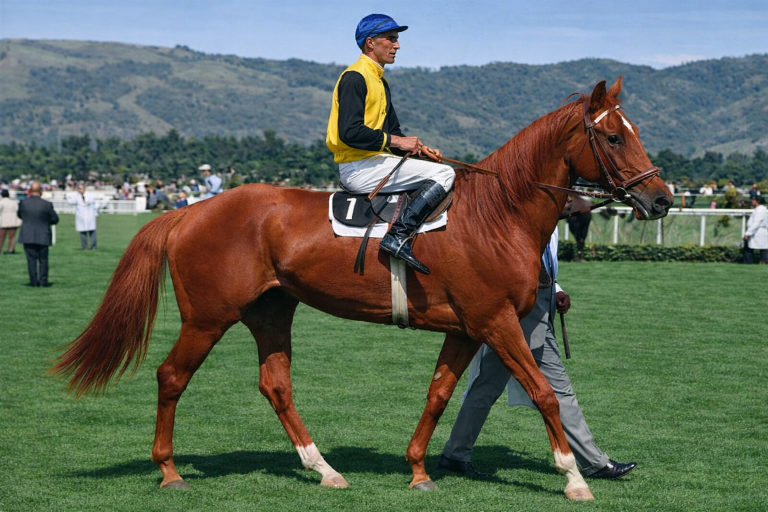
Redcraze, 1956 winner

== History ==
The race was named as the Victory Cup in 1946 when racing was resumed after World War II in Queensland.

Due to track reconstruction of Eagle Farm Racecourse the event was transferred to Doomben Racecourse with a slightly shorter distance of 2200 metres.

=== Distance ===
- 1866 - 2 1/4 miles (~3600 metres)
- 1867–1882 – 2 miles (~3200 metres)
- 1883 - 1 3/4 miles (~2800 metres)
- 1884–1887 – 2 miles (~3200 metres)
- 1888 - 1 3/4 miles (~2800 metres)
- 1889–1941 – 2 miles (~3200 metres)
- 1942–1945 - Race not run during World War II
- 1946 - 1 1/2 miles (~2400 metres)
- 1947–1972 – 2 miles (~3200 metres)
- 1973–2006 – 3200 metres
- 2007–2014 – 2400 metres
- 2015 – 2200 metres
- 2016 – 2400 metres
- 2017 & 2018 – 2200 metres
- 2019 – 2400 metres
- 2021 onwards – 3200 metres

=== Grade ===
- 1866–1979 - Principal race
- 1980–2006 - Group 1
- 2007 onwards - Group 2

=== Venue ===
- 2015 - Doomben Racecourse
- 2017 - Doomben Racecourse
- 2018 - Doomben Racecourse

== Winners ==
The following are past winners of the race.

- 2026 - Alalcance
- 2025 - Campaldino (NZ)
- 2024 - Alegron
- 2023 - Selino
- 2022 - Irish Sequel
- 2021 - Knights Order
- 2020 - ‡race not held
- 2019 - Sixties Groove
- 2018 - Sedanzer
- 2017 - Chocante
- 2016 - Benzini
- 2015 - Jetset Lad
- 2014 - Floria
- 2013 - Moriarity
- 2012 - Lights Of Heaven
- 2011 - Tullamore
- 2010 - Crossthestart
- 2009 - Scenic Shot
- 2008 - Viewed
- 2007 - Newport
- 2006 - Art Success
- 2005 - Portland Singa
- 2004 - Danestorm
- 2003 - Piachay
- 2002 - Prized Gem
- 2001 - Star Covet
- 2000 - Yippyio
- 1999 - Sheer Kingston
- 1998 - Praise Indeed
- 1997 - Desert Chill
- 1996 - Dupain
- 1995 - Desert Chill
- 1994 - Sky Flyer
- 1993 - Barbut Delcia
- 1992 - Grooming
- 1991 - Just A Dancer
- 1990 - Shuzohra
- 1989 - Coshking
- 1988 - Lord Hybrow
- 1987 - Limitless
- 1986 - Marlon
- 1985 - Foxseal
- 1984 - Chiamare
- 1983 - Amarant
- 1982 - Queen's Road
- 1981 - Four Crowns
- 1980 - Love Bandit
- 1979 - Grey Affair
- 1978 - Muros
- 1977 - Reckless
- 1976 - Balmerino
- 1975 - Herminia
- 1974 - Igloo
- 1973 - Irish Whip
- 1972 - Mode
- 1971 - Royal Shah
- 1970 - Cachondeo
- 1969 - Galleon King
- 1968 - Prominence
- 1967 - Fulmen
- 1966 - Apa
- 1965 - Fair Patton
- 1964 - Fair Patton
- 1963 - Campo
- 1962 - Kamikaze
- 1961 - Tulloch
- 1960 - Valerius
- 1959 - Macdougal
- 1958 - Timor
- 1957 - Cambridge
- 1956 - Redcraze
- 1955 - The Wash
- 1954 - Lancaster
- 1953 - Hydrogen
- 1952 - Putoko
- 1951 - Prince O' Fairies
- 1950 - Silver Buzz
- 1949 - Sanctus
- 1948 - Sicarda
- 1947 - Blue Boots
- 1946 - Good Idea
- 1942–45 - race not held
- 1941 - Lady Buzzard
- 1940 - Tragopan
- 1939 - Spear Chief
- 1938 - Spear Chief
- 1937 - Glen's Spear
- 1936 - Lough Neagh
- 1935 - Rivalli
- 1934 - St. Valorey
- 1933 - Herolage
- 1932 - St. Valorey
- 1931 - Royal Smile
- 1930 - Trainer
- 1929 - In Petto
- 1928 - Canning Queen
- 1927 - Kentle
- 1926 - Piastoon
- 1925 - Te Kara
- 1924 - Balaton
- 1923 - Seremite
- 1922 - Grichka
- 1921 - Impeyan
- 1920 - Golden Sunset
- 1919 - Venerable
- 1918 - Irish Princess
- 1917 - Bunting
- 1916 - Demeranthis
- 1915 - Rue Victoria
- 1914 - Cagou
- 1913 - Rosard
- 1912 - Goard
- 1911 - Black Paint
- 1910 - Curve
- 1909 - Fightaway
- 1908 - Plunder
- 1907 - Haidee
- 1906 - Scorcher
- 1905 - Fitz Grafton
- 1904 - Fitz Grafton
- 1903 - Jessie
- 1902 - Palmer
- 1901 - Rabato
- 1900 - Boreas Ii
- 1899 - Dundonald
- 1898 - Rubydor
- 1897 - Battalion
- 1896 - Tornado
- 1895 - Orville
- 1894 - Yelverton
- 1893 - Tridentate
- 1892 - Splendide
- 1891 - Lurline
- 1890 - Lyndhurst
- 1889 - Quicksilver
- 1888 - Sirius
- 1887 - Wetherondale
- 1886 - Bonnie Bee
- 1885 - Lancer
- 1884 - Legacy
- 1883 - Mozart
- 1882 - Proctor
- 1881 - Lord Clifden
- 1880 - Major
- 1879 - Sydney
- 1878 - †The Dean/Strathearn
- 1877 - Sunrise
- 1876 - Irish Stew
- 1875 - Carbine
- 1874 - Zanco
- 1873 - Wanderer
- 1872 - Zanco
- 1871 - Greyskim
- 1870 - Dandy
- 1869 - Premier
- 1868 - Sydney
- 1867 - North Australian
- 1866 - Forester

† Dead heat

‡ Not held because of the COVID-19 pandemic

== See also ==
- Dane Ripper Stakes
- Gunsynd Classic
- J. J. Atkins
- Queensland Derby
- Queensland Guineas
- Stradbroke Handicap
- The Q22 (Eagle Farm Cup / P J O'Shea Stakes)
- Adelaide Cup
- Sydney Cup
- Melbourne Cup
- List of Australian Group races
- Group races
