= Stradbroke Handicap =

Horse race in Brisbane, Australia

- Class: Group 1
- Location: Eagle Farm Racecourse; Brisbane, Australia
- Inaugurated: 1890
- Race type: Thoroughbred - flat racing
- Sponsor: Ladbrokes (2026)

Race information
- Distance: 1,400 metres
- Surface: Turf
- Track: Right-handed
- Qualification: Open
- Weight: Handicap
- Purse: A$3,000,000 (2026)

The Stradbroke Handicap is a Brisbane Racing Club Group 1 Thoroughbred open handicap horse race, run over a distance of 1,400 metres at Eagle Farm Racecourse, Brisbane in June during the Queensland Winter Racing Carnival.

== History ==
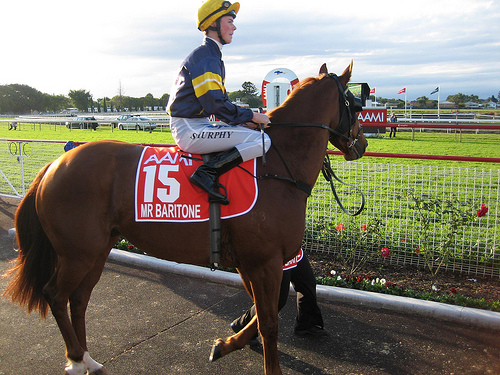
Mr Baritone - 2008 winner

The race is named after Lord Stradbroke, relative of Henry John Rous, originator of the weight-for-age scale in thoroughbred racing.

Five two-year-olds have won the race, the last was Wiggle, carrying 7 stone 5 pounds (~46.5 kg) in 1958. The 1,400 metre race and track record is 1:20.2 established by Toledo in 1998. Between 1982 and 1988 the race was known as the Elders Handicap.

== Distance ==
In 1890 the Stradbroke Handicap was a Principal race run over six furlongs (~1,200m), when it was won by Pyrrhus.

The distance was changed in 1953 to 7 furlongs and in 1972 to the current distance of 1,400 metres.

Due to track reconstruction of Eagle Farm Racecourse, for the 2014–15 racing season the event was transferred to Doomben Racecourse over a slightly shorter distance of 1350 metres.

== 1951 racebook ==
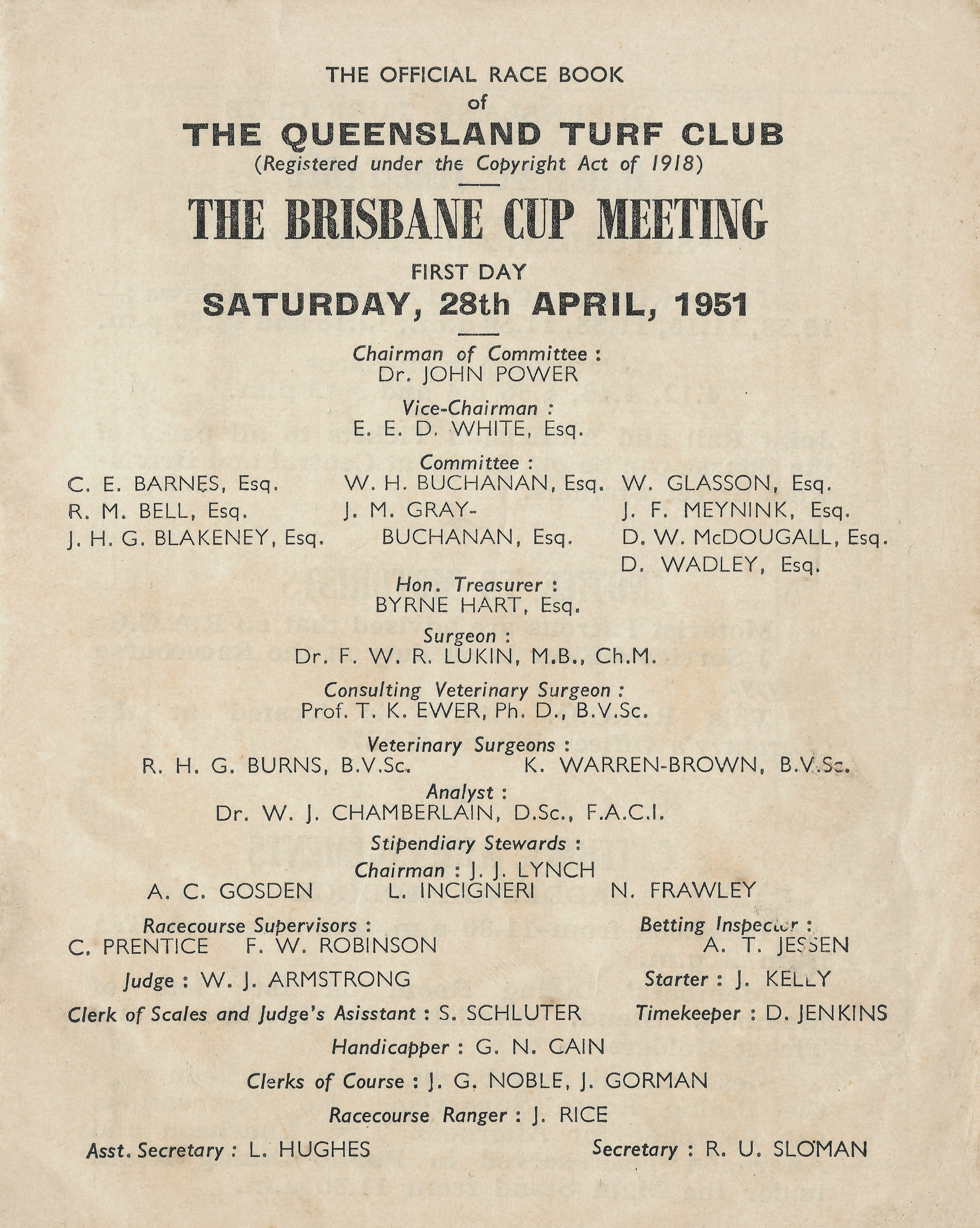
1951 QTC Stradbroke Handicap showing raceday officials

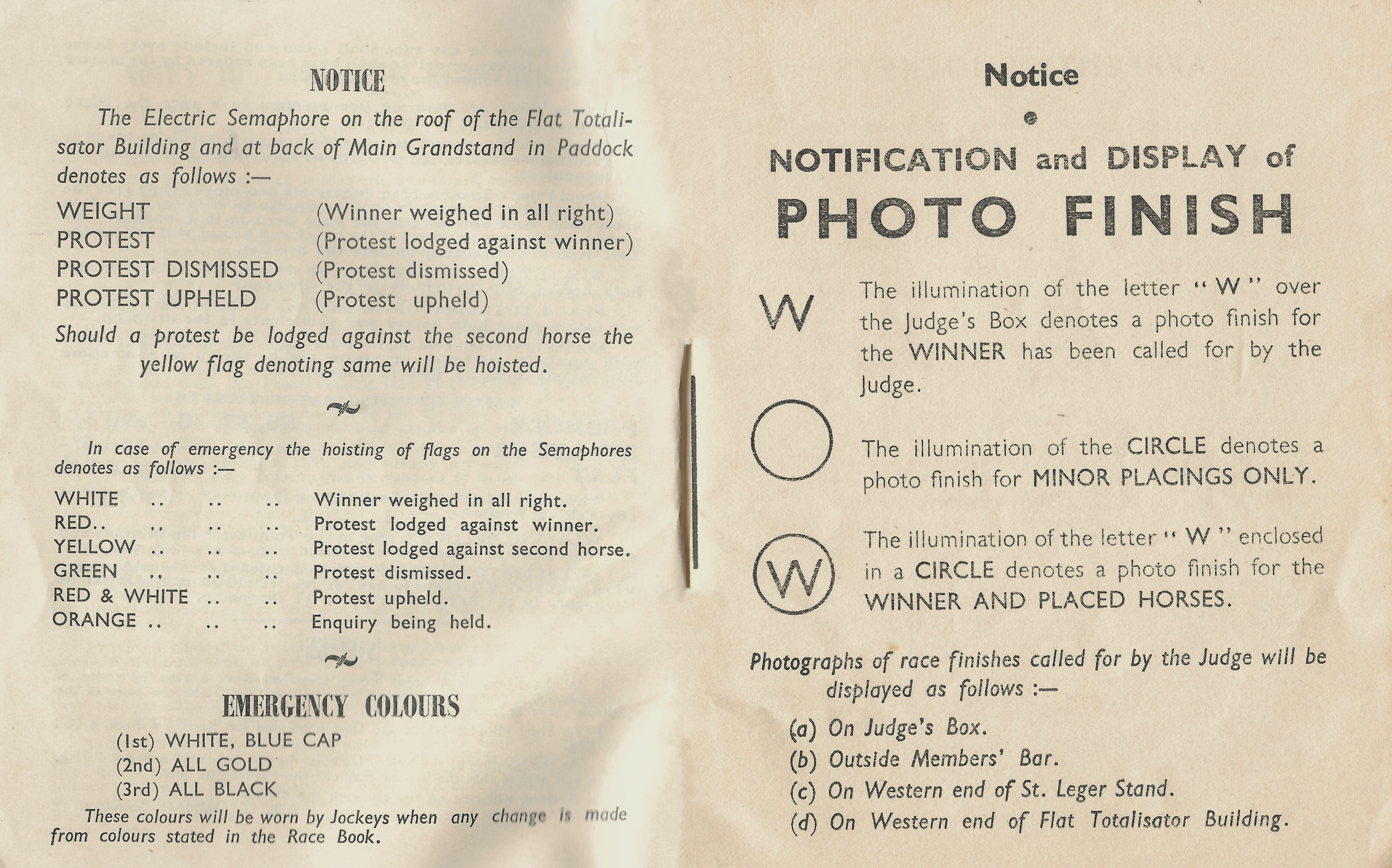
1951 QTC Stradbroke Handicap showing raceday notices

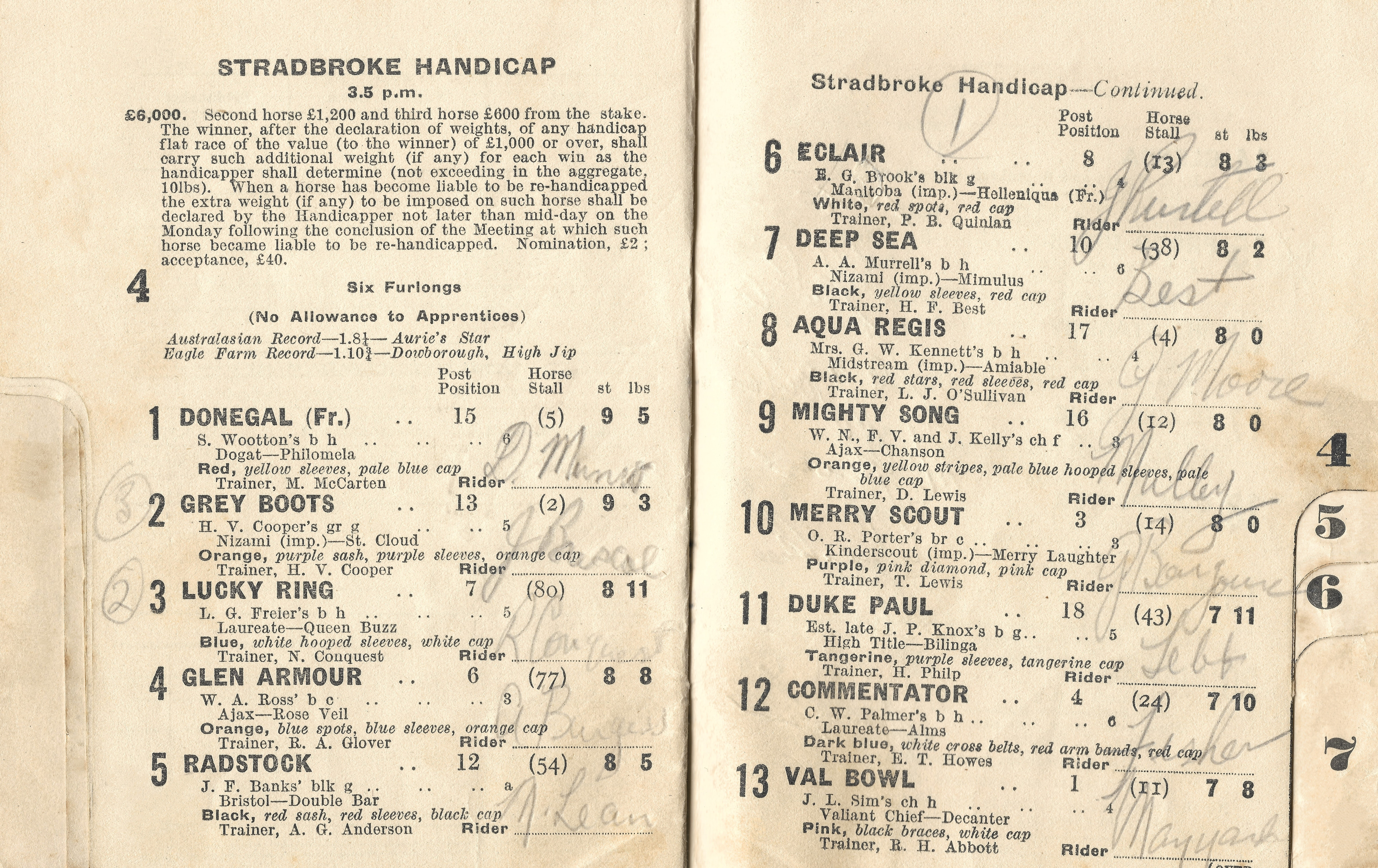
1951 QTC Stradbroke Handicap showing the winner, Aqua Regis

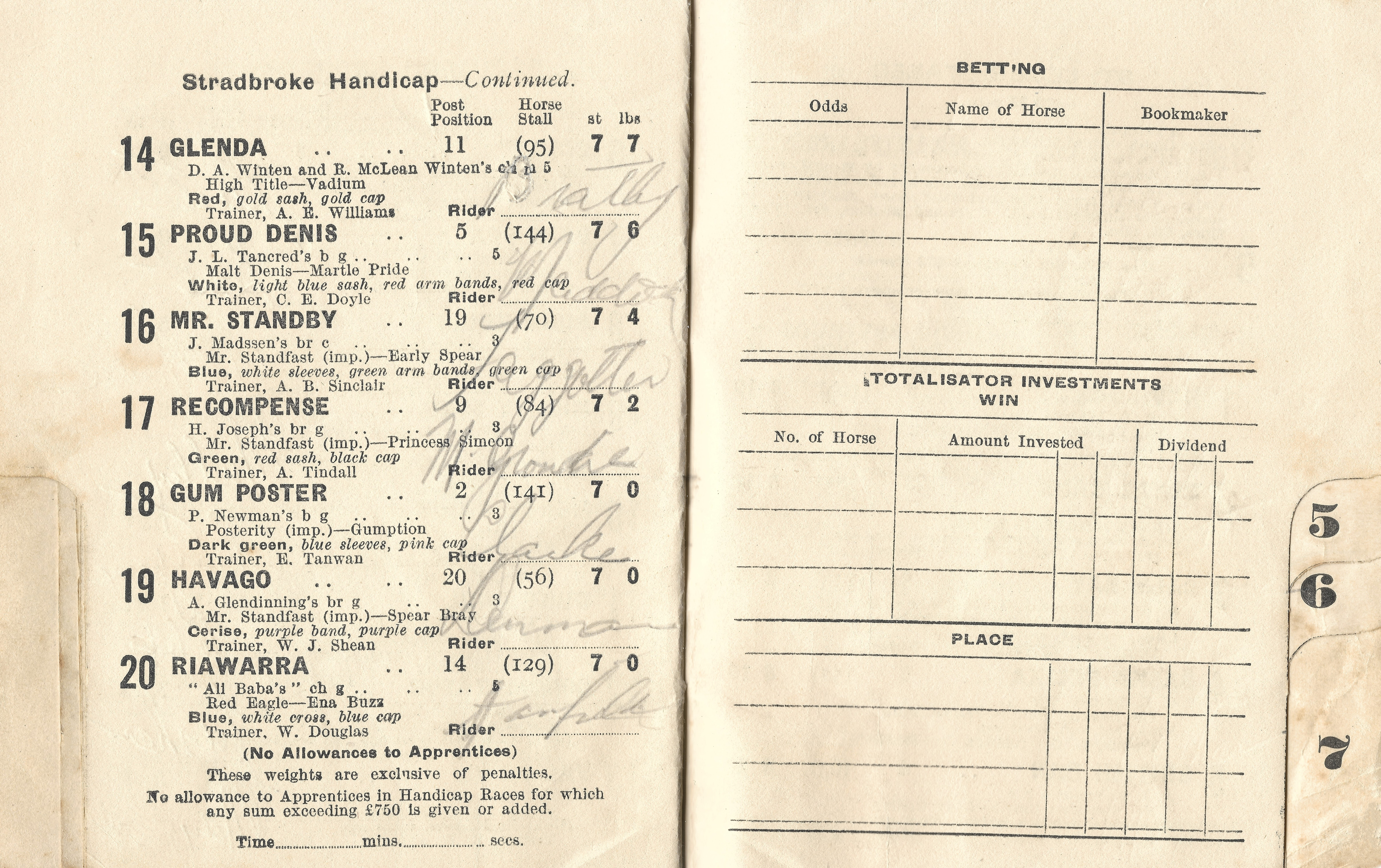
1951 QTC Stradbroke Handicap starters and results

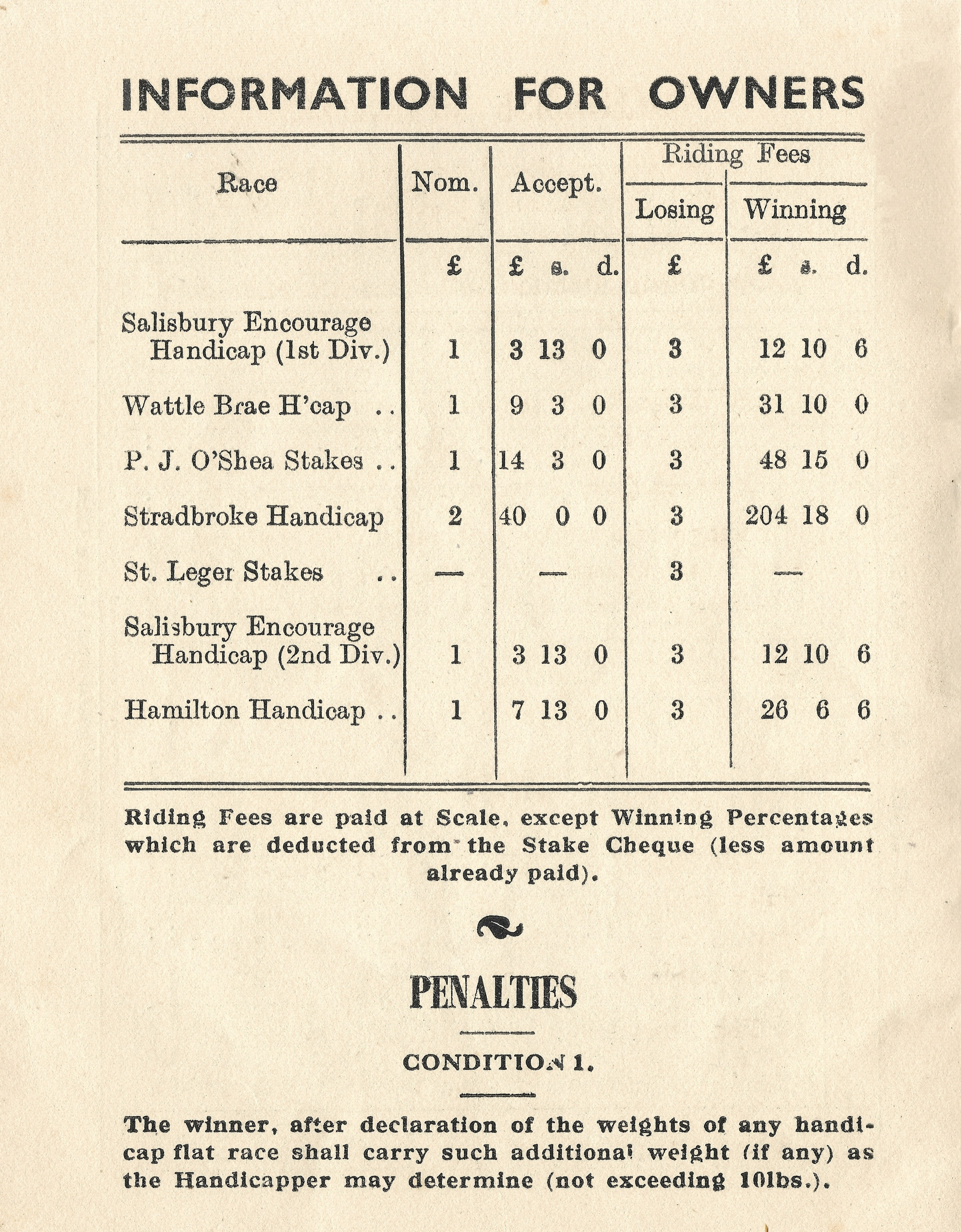
1951 QTC Stradbroke Handicap showing information notices for owners

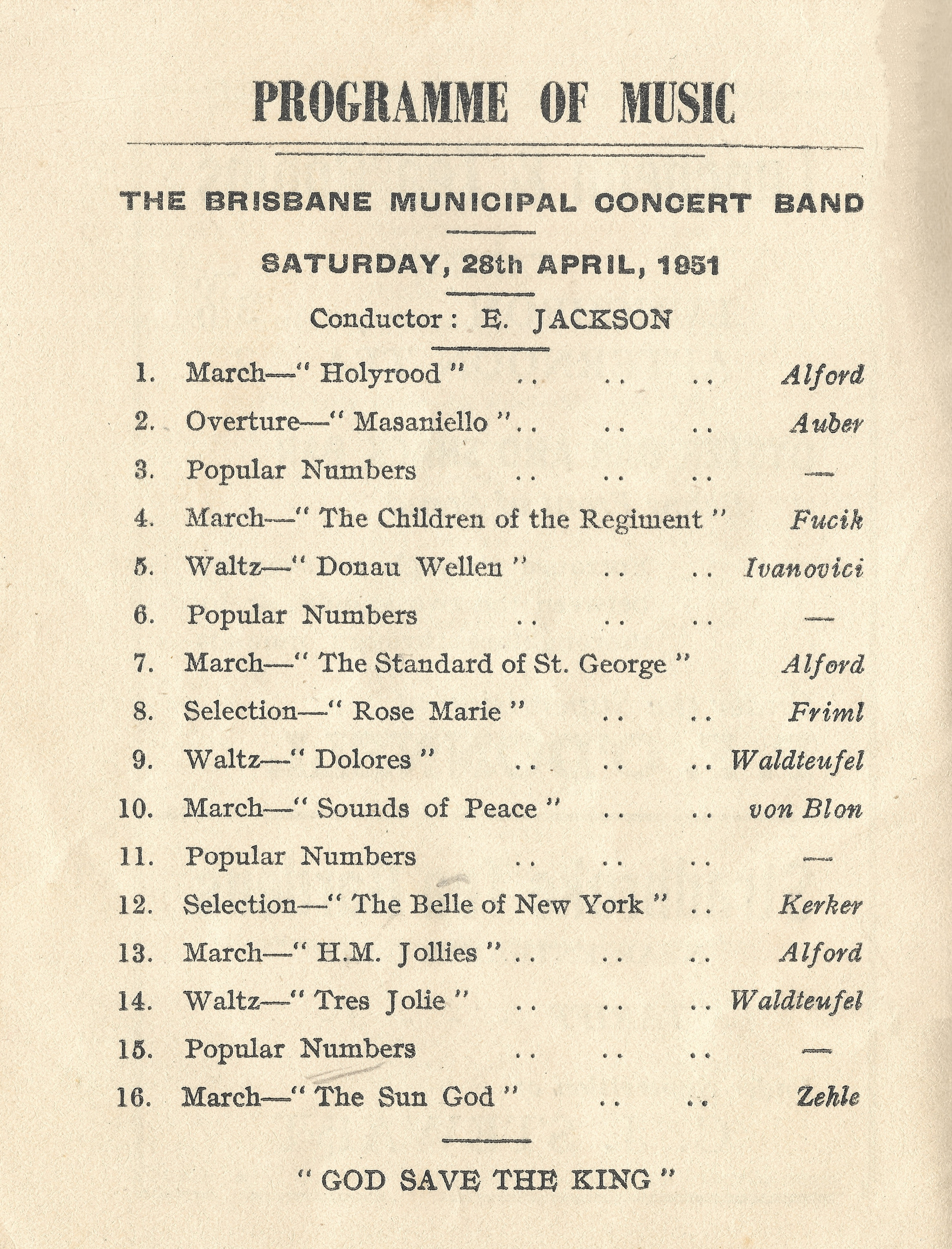
1951 QTC Stradbroke Handicap showing raceday programme of music

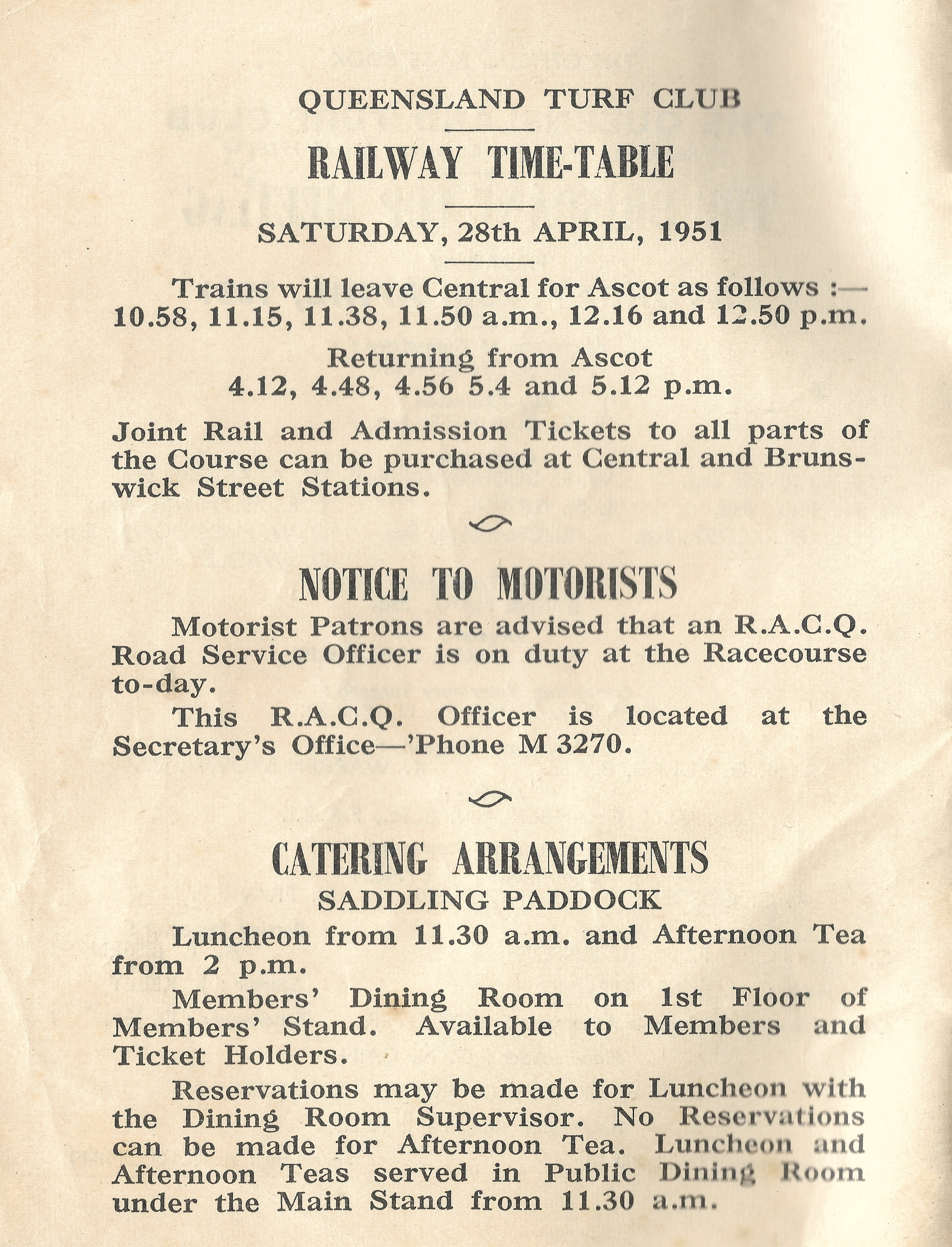
Back cover showing railway and catering arrangements

== Winners ==
The following are past winners of the race.

- 2026 - Spicy Martini
- 2025 - War Machine
- 2024 - Stefi Magnetica
- 2023 - Think About It
- 2022 - Alligator Blood
- 2021 - Tofane
- 2020 - Tyzone
- 2019 - Trekking
- 2018 - Santa Ana Lane
- 2017 - Impending
- 2016 - Under The Louvre
- 2015 - Srikandi
- 2014 - River Lad
- 2013 - Linton
- 2012 - Mid Summer Music
- 2011 - Sincero
- 2010 - Black Piranha
- 2009 - Black Piranha
- 2008 - Mr Baritone
- 2007 - Sniper's Bullet
- 2006 - La Montagna
- 2005 - St. Basil
- 2004 - Thorn Park
- 2003 - Private Steer
- 2002 - Show A Heart
- 2001 - Crawl
- 2000 - Landsighting
- 1999 - Adam
- 1998 - Toledo
- 1997 - Dane Ripper
- 1996 - Danasinga
- 1995 - Rouslan
- 1994 - All Our Mob
- 1993 - Never Undercharge
- 1992 - Rough Habit
- 1991 - Rough Habit
- 1990 - Plush Embassy
- 1989 - Robian Steel
- 1988 - Campaign King
- 1987 - Dancing Poet
- 1986 - Daybreak Lover
- 1985 - Canterbury Belle
- 1984 - Daybreak Lover
- 1983 - Brenlaine
- 1982 - Grey Receiver
- 1981 - Watney
- 1980 - Bemboka Yacht
- 1979 - Imposing
- 1978 - Innisfree
- 1977 - Sir Wisp
- 1976 - Manawapoi
- 1975 - Spedito
- 1974 - Go Fun
- 1973 - Lucky Cloud
- 1972 - Triton
- 1971 - Rajah Sahib
- 1970 - Divide And Rule
- 1969 - Prince Medes
- 1968 - Cabochon
- 1967 - Mister Hush
- 1966 - Castanea
- 1965 - Winfreux
- 1964 - Cele's Image
- 1963 - Mullala
- 1962 - Kilshery
- 1961 - Persian Lyric
- 1960 - Wallgar
- 1959 - Grey Ghost
- 1958 - ‡Wiggle
- 1957 - Kingster
- 1956 - Knave
- 1955 - Plato
- 1954 - Karendi
- 1953 - Suncup
- 1952 - Wedborough
- 1951 - Aqua Regis
- 1950 - Lucky Ring
- 1949 - Lucky Ring
- 1948 - Ballyvista
- 1947 - Hedui
- 1946 - Abbeville
- 1942–45 - race not held
- 1941 - High Rank
- 1940 - Heroic's Double
- 1939 - Bahwing
- 1938 - Thurles Lad
- 1937 - King Merlin
- 1936 - Capris
- 1935 - Petrol Lager
- 1934 - Petrol Lager
- 1933 - Sun Eagle
- 1932 - Credence
- 1931 - Lady Linden
- 1930 - Will Yet
- 1929 - I.O.U.
- 1928 - Sarlind
- 1927 - Running Girl
- 1926 - Highland
- 1925 - Highland
- 1924 - Molly Cyrus
- 1923 - Lady Aura
- 1922 - Laneffe
- 1921 - Syceonelle
- 1920 - Syce Lad
- 1919 - Gold Tie
- 1918 - Gold Tie
- 1917 - Sydney Damsel
- 1916 - ‡Amberdown
- 1915 - Cairn Wallace
- 1914 - Malt Mark
- 1913 - ‡Line Gun
- 1912 - Pittsworth Gun
- 1911 - Lady Hope
- 1910 - Bright Laddie
- 1909 - Storm King
- 1908 - Satisfair
- 1907 - Jessie's Dream
- 1906 - Darelong
- 1905 - Ruscity
- 1904 - Forge
- 1903 - ‡Fitz Grafton
- 1902 - Blunderer
- 1901 - Glengarry
- 1900 - Prince Edward
- 1899 - ‡Sweetheart
- 1898 - Boreas Ii
- 1897 - †The Scamp/Dalnair
- 1896 - Babel
- 1895 - Babel
- 1894 - Studbook
- 1893 - Rosy Dawn
- 1892 - Tallboy
- 1891 - Dan O'Connell
- 1890 - Pyrrhus
¶ In 1980 Ducatoon was first past the post but was later disqualified after returning a positive swab.

† Dead heat

‡ Two-year-olds

== See also ==
- Brisbane Cup
- Dane Ripper Stakes
- Gunsynd Classic
- J. J. Atkins
- The Q22 (Eagle Farm Cup / P J O'Shea Stakes)
- Doomben Cup
- Doomben 10,000
- Queensland Derby
- Queensland Guineas
- List of Australian Group races
- Group races
