= Redcraze =

New Zealand-bred Thoroughbred racehorse

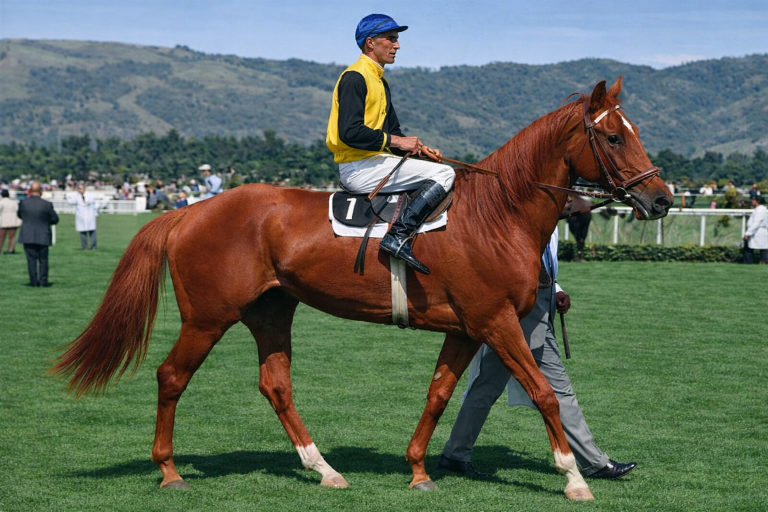
- Redcraze in New Zealand circa 1953
- Sire: Red Mars (GB)
- Grandsire: Hyperion
- Dam: Myarion
- Damsire: Myosotis (GB)
- Sex: Gelding
- Foaled: 1950
- Country: New Zealand
- Colour: Chestnut
- Trainer: Syd Brown; T.J. Smith
- Record: 84:32-11-9
- Earnings: $142,962

Major wins
- Awapuni Gold Cup (1955); Turnbull Stakes (1955); Brisbane Cup (1956); P.J. O'Shea Stakes (1956, 1957); Hill Stakes (1956, 1957); Colin Stephen Stakes (1956); Metropolitan Handicap (1956); Caulfield Stakes (1956); Caulfield Cup (1956); St George Stakes (1957); VRC Queens Plate (1957); VRC Queen Elizabeth Stakes (1957); Rawson Stakes (1957); AJC Autumn Stakes (1957); W.S. Cox Plate (1957)

Honours
- Australian Racing Hall of Fame; New Zealand Racing Hall of Fame

Redcraze (born 1950) was a champion New Zealand Thoroughbred racehorse who raced both in Australia and New Zealand, winning major races in both countries.

A chestnut son of the Hyperion stallion Red Mars from the mare Myarion he is considered one of the finest horses not to win a Melbourne Cup, despite three attempts.

Often asked to carry weights in handicap races his big frame and amazing recuperative powers saw him race until he was seven.

Originally trained by Syd Brown in New Zealand he was transferred to the stables of Tommy Smith in Australia as a late five-year-old.

It was in the care of Tommy Smith that he realised his huge potential.

Perhaps his greatest effort was when he ran second in the 1956 Melbourne Cup to the quality staying mare Evening Peal. As Redcraze usually raced at the tail of the field he produced a big finish, coming from the rear and just failing to win by a half-neck. What made the performance amazing is that he was carrying a handicap of 10 st 3 lb (65 kg) conceding 2 st 3 lb (14 kg) to the winner.

He was retired following an unplaced effort in the 1957 Melbourne Cup. His prize money at the time was an Australian record.
