= Kang G. Shin =

South Korean computer scientist (born 1946)

Kang Geun Shin
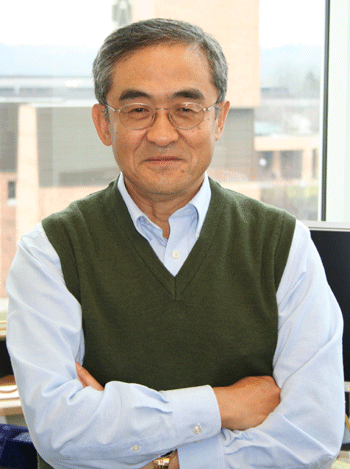
- Born: 1946 (age 79–80); South Korea
- Education: Seoul National University (BS); Cornell University (MS, PhD)
- Known for: Real-time computing, Embedded systems, Cyber-physical systems, Computer networks, Security and Privacy
- Scientific career
- Fields: Computer science and Computer engineering
- Workplaces: Rensselaer Polytechnic; University of Michigan
- Doctoral advisor: Myunghwan Kim
- Doctoral students: Tarek Abdelzaher; Ella Atkins; Jennifer Rexford; Sunghyun Choi

Kang Geun Shin (Korean: 신강근; born 1946) is a South Korean-born computer scientist and the Kevin and Nancy O'Connor Professor of Computer Science in the Electrical Engineering and Computer Science Department at the University of Michigan. He is also the founding director of the Real-Time Computing Laboratory (RTCL). He is known for his contributions to the field of real-time fault-tolerant systems. Shin is a recipient of the Korean Ho-Am Prize in Engineering. This prize is awarded for the "outstanding contributions to the development of science and culture and enhancement of the welfare of mankind".

In 1992, Kang G. Shin was elevated to the grade of IEEE fellow for his contributions to the theory of dynamic failure in real-time computing systems.

== Education ==
Shin received a BS (1970) in electronic engineering from Seoul National University and an MS (1976) and a PhD (1978) in electrical engineering from Cornell University.

== Research interests ==
- Wireless real-time networking
- Computation and network security
- Cyber-physical systems
- Virtualization-based server consolidation and resource management

== Real-Time Computing Laboratory (RTCL) ==
RTCL is a research group in the EECS dept. at University of Michigan. The research topics at RTCL include:

- Quality-of-Service (QoS) sensitive computation and networking, especially focusing on Internet services and applications
- Real-time operating systems and middleware services
- Distributed system architectures for timeliness and dependability QoS
- Fault-tolerant system design, analysis, and validation
- Open controller software architectures and real time databases for embedded systems like automobiles, automated homes and factories.

RTCL Alumni Tree
