= Dane Ripper Stakes =

Thoroughbred horse race in Australia

- Class: Group 2
- Location: Eagle Farm Racecourse; Brisbane, Australia
- Inaugurated: 1992 (as Crown Lager Fillies and Mares Quality Handicap)
- Race type: Thoroughbred - Flat racing
- Sponsor: Magic Millions (2021-2026)

Race information
- Distance: 1,300 metres
- Surface: Turf
- Track: Right-handed
- Qualification: Fillies and Mares
- Weight: Set Weights with penalties
- Purse: A$300,000 (2026)

The Dane Ripper Stakes is a Brisbane Racing Club Group 2 Thoroughbred horse race held, under quality handicap conditions, for fillies and mares, over a distance of 1300 metres held at Eagle Farm Racecourse in Brisbane during the Queensland Winter Racing Carnival.

== History ==
The race was inaugurated as a supporting race (Race 7) on the Stradbroke Handicap racecard on 6 June 1992. Recently the race has been scheduled on Queensland Oaks day but was moved in 2013 to Stradbroke Handicap day. The race was upgraded to a Listed race in 2003.

Due to track reconstruction of Eagle Farm Racecourse for the 2014–15 racing season the event was transferred to Doomben Racecourse and run over a slightly shorter distance.

Winners of the Dane Ripper Stakes–Winter Stakes double are:

- Blushing Bijou (1992) and
- Tripping (1996).

=== Name ===
- 1992–1994 - Crown Lager Fillies and Mares Quality Handicap
- 1995 - Icegold Handicap
- 1996–1999 - Global TV Fillies and Mares Quality Handicap
- 2000–2001 - Dane Ripper Handicap
- 2002 - Triple M's Blood, Sweat 'n' Beers Handicap
- 2003–2004 - Dane Ripper Handicap
- 2005–2006 - Dane Ripper Quality
- 2007 onwards - Dane Ripper Stakes

=== Grade ===
- 2003–2005 - Listed Race
- 2006–2009 - Group 3
- 2010 onwards - Group 2

=== Distance ===
- 1992–1993 – 1200 metres
- 1994–2005 – 1300 metres
- 2006–2014 – 1400 metres
- 2015 – 1350 metres
- 2016–2020 – 1400 metres
- 2021 onwards – 1300 metres

=== Venue ===
- 2017 - Doomben Racecourse
- 2015 - Doomben Racecourse

== Winners ==
The following are past winners of the race.

- 2026 - She's Got Pizzazz
- 2025 - Floozie
- 2024 - C'est Magique
- 2023 - Comrade Rosa
- 2022 - Palaisipan
- 2021 - Brooklyn Hustle
- 2020 - Love You Lucy
- 2019 - Invincibella
- 2018 - Invincibella
- 2017 - Prompt Response
- 2016 - Cradle Me
- 2015 - Hazard
- 2014 - Cosmic Endeavour
- 2013 - Red Tracer
- 2012 - Red Tracer
- 2011 - Hurtle Myrtle
- 2010 - Set For Fame
- 2009 - Chinchilla Rose
- 2008 - Vietnam
- 2007 - Rosa’s Spur
- 2006 - Countess Bathory
- 2005 - Our Sweet Moss
- 2004 - Ta Ta Tatiana
- 2003 - Recurring
- 2002 - Princess Clang
- 2001 - China Amber
- 2000 - Annunciation
- 1999 - Grouse Lane
- 1998 - Dynamic Reason
- 1997 - Belle Salieri
- 1996 - Tripping
- 1995 - Jazz Heaven
- 1994 - Seawinne
- 1993 - Vanity Queen
- 1992 - Blushing Bijou

== See also ==
- Brisbane Cup
- Gunsynd Classic
- J. J. Atkins
- Queensland Derby
- Queensland Guineas
- Stradbroke Handicap
- The Q22 (Eagle Farm Cup / P J O'Shea Stakes)
- List of Australian Group races
- Group races
