= Tarek Abdelzaher =

Egyptian computer scientist

Tarek Farouk A. Abdelzaher
- Born: Tarek Farouk A. Abdelzaher; Egypt
- Education: Ain Shams University (B.Sc., M.Sc., Electrical & Computer Engineering); University of Michigan (Ph.D., Computer Science and Engineering, 1999)
- Occupations: Computer scientist, professor
- Employer: University of Illinois at Urbana–Champaign
- Known for: Real-time computing; Cyber-physical systems (CPS); Social sensing and IoT
- Notable work: Editor-in-Chief of Journal of Real-Time Systems (20 years)
- Title: Sohaib and Sara Abbasi Professor of Computer Science; Willett Faculty Scholar
- Awards: Outstanding Technical Achievement and Leadership Award in Real-Time Systems (IEEE, 2012); Xerox Award for Faculty Research (2011); ACM Fellow (2019); IEEE Fellow (2021)
- Scientific career
- Doctoral advisor: Kang G. Shin
- Website: https://abdelzaher.cs.illinois.edu

Tarek Farouk A. Abdelzaher is an Egyptian-American computer scientist.

Abdelzaher earned bachelor's and master's degrees in at computer and electrical engineering at Ain Shams University, followed by a doctorate from the University of Michigan in 1999, advised by Kang G. Shin. He is the Sohaib and Sara Abbasi Professor of Computer Science at the University of Illinois. Abdelzaher was chief editor of the Journal of Real-Time Systems for twenty years. In 2019, Abdelzaher was awarded fellow status by the Association for Computing Machinery. He was granted an equivalent honor by the IEEE in 2021, "for contributions to cyber-physical systems and real-time computing."
