= Thomas Atkins =

Thomas, Tom, or Tommy Atkins may refer to:

== People ==
- Thomas Atkins (mercer) (fl. 1570s to 1590s), Elizabethan member of parliament and holder of public offices
- Thomas Atkins (Lord Mayor) (fl. 1640 to 1653), Lord Mayor of London, 1637
- Tommy Atkins (director) (1887–1968), American film director
- Tommy Atkins (baseball) (1887–1956), pitcher in Major League Baseball
- Thomas E. Atkins (1921–1999), United States Army soldier and Medal of Honor recipient
- Tom Atkins (actor) (born 1935), American television and film actor
- Thomas I. Atkins (1939–2008), Boston City Council member and general counsel of the NAACP
- Tom Atkins (footballer) (born 1995), Australian rules footballer

== Other uses ==
- Tommy Atkins, a term for a common soldier in the British Army
- Tommy Atkins (1915 film), a British film
- Tommy Atkins (1928 film), a British film
- Tommy Atkins (mango), a mango cultivar

== See also ==
- Tommy Adkins (1932–2013), Canadian football player
- "Tommy" (Kipling poem) (1890)
