= Eagle Farm Racecourse =

Heritage listed horse racing venue in Brisbane

Coordinates: 27.427738°S 153.06736°E

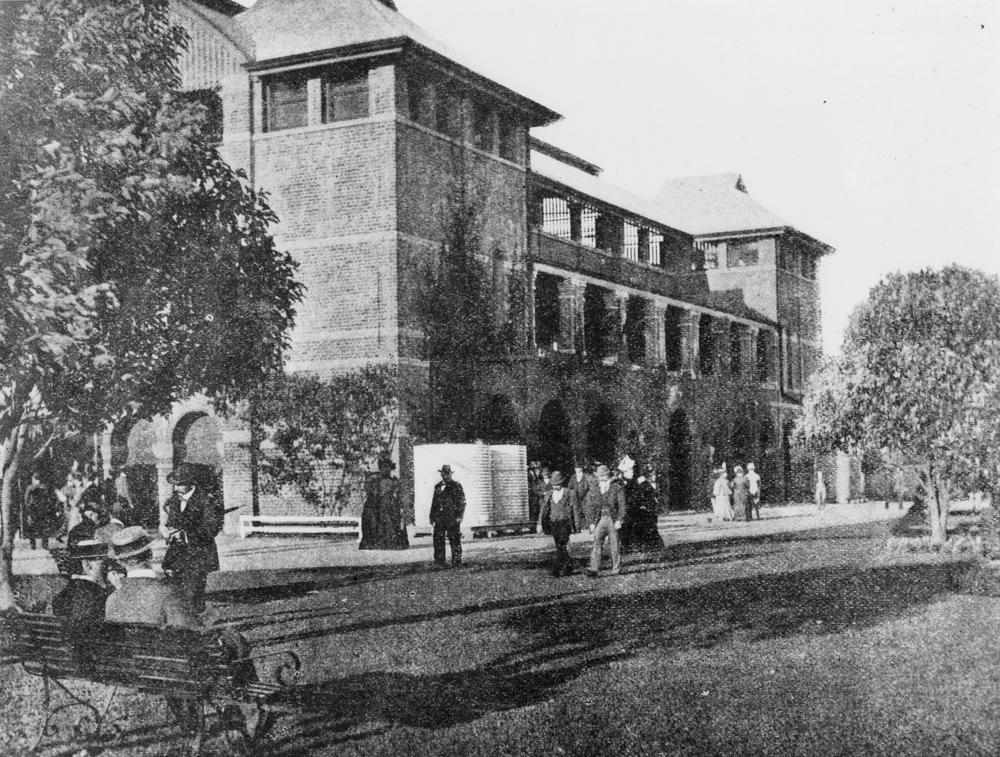
Scene at Eagle Farm racecourse, 1900

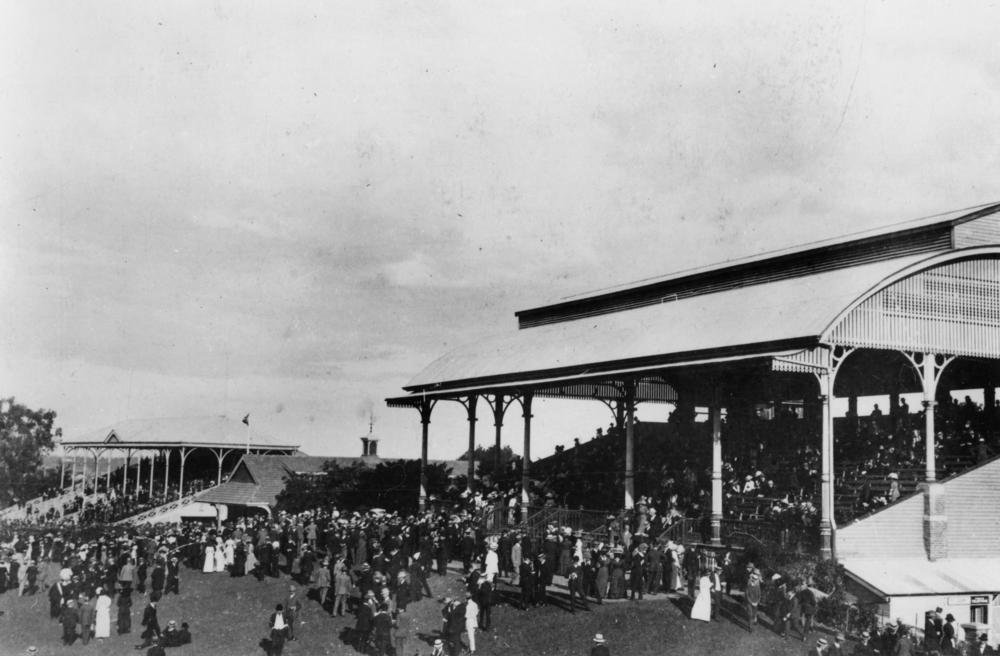
Grandstand at Eagle Farm Racecourse c. 1914

Eagle Farm Racecourse is a heritage-listed horse racing venue in Brisbane, Queensland, Australia. It is located at the northern end of Racecourse Road in the suburb of Ascot, 7 kilometres (4.3 mi) from the Brisbane central business district.

The turf track is 28 metres (92 ft) wide, with a circumference of 2,027 metres (6,650 ft) and a home straight of 434 metres (1,424 ft). Races are run in a clockwise direction.

Doomben Racecourse is located nearby in the same suburb.

== History ==
The Eagle Farm Racecourse was established in 1863 and it is now the premier racecourse in Brisbane.

On 15 August 1883 the venue hosted the first rugby union game in Brisbane between Queensland (now Reds) and NSW (now Waratahs), which was also historically significant as the first match anywhere in the world where the referee used a whistle.

In 1889–1890, the architecture partnership Hunter and Corrie and architect John H. Buckeridge jointly designed the grandstands, known as the Paddock Stands. They also designed stables and sheds.

In 1941 the racecourse was taken over by the military authorities to house thousands of American troops during the Pacific War. It was then known as U.S. Camp Ascot.

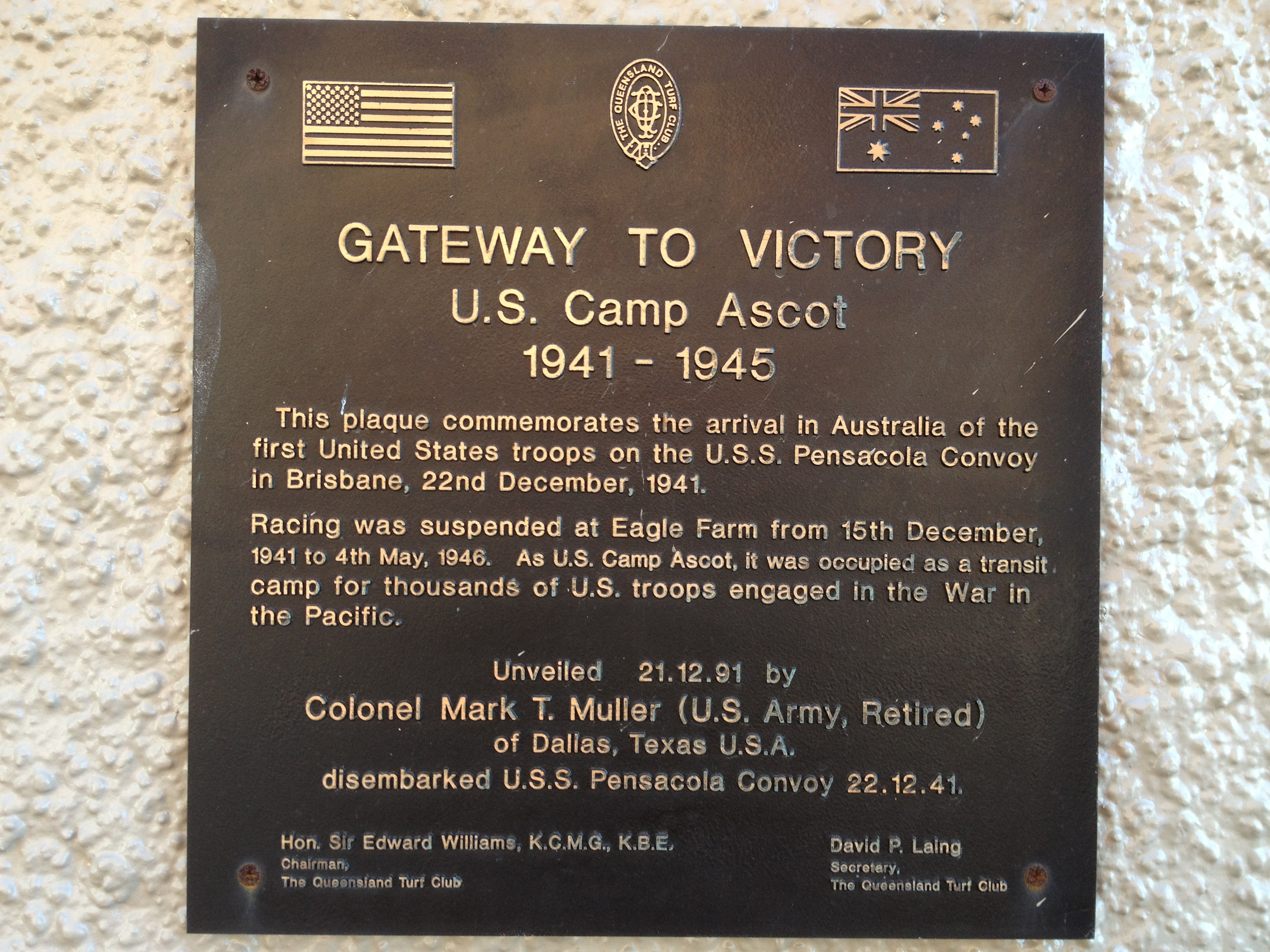
U.S. Camp Ascot Plaque at Eagle Farm Racecourse

== Heritage listing ==
A combined entry Eagle Farm Racecourse and Ascot Railway Station was listed on the Queensland Heritage Register in 2004.

== Transport ==
Ascot railway station has direct access to the racecourse and is located on the Doomben line. The racecourse can also be accessed by bus and, from Bretts Wharf, by CityCat.

== Races ==
The following is a list of Group races which are run at Eagle Farm Racecourse:

Grp	Race Name	Age	Sex	Weight	Distance	Date
1	Queensland Derby	3YO	Open	sw	2400	June
1	Queensland Oaks	3YO	Fillies	sw	2400	June
1	Stradbroke Handicap	Open	Open	hcp	1400	June
1	The T J Smith	2YO	Open	hcp	1600	June
1	Winter Stakes	Open	Open	wfa	1400	June
2	Brisbane Cup	Open	Open	hcp	2400	June
2	P J O'Shea Stakes	Open	Open	wfa	2400	June
2	QTC Cup	Open	Open	hcp	1300	June
2	QTC Sires Produce Stakes	2YO	Open	sw	1400	June
2	Queensland Guineas	3YO	Open	sw	1600	June
2	Sir Byrne Hart Stakes	Open	Open	wfa	1200	May
3	Dane Ripper Quality	Open	F&M	qlty	1400	June
3	Grand Prix Stakes	3YO	Open	hcp	2100	June
3	Tattersall's Cup	Open	Open	hcp	2200	June
3	W J Healy Stakes	Open	Open	hcp	1200	June
3	Queen's Cup	Open	Open	hcp	3200	July
