= Independent candidates in the 2007 Manitoba provincial election =

There were six independent candidates in the 2007 Manitoba provincial election, none of whom were elected.

One independent candidate, Conrad Santos, was formerly a Member of the Legislative Assembly with the New Democratic Party. Information about the other candidates may be found here.

== Candidates ==
=== Minnedosa: Colin George Atkins ===
Colin George Atkins was born in Leeds, England on June 24, 1931, and moved to Canada in 1952. Now retired, he lives in Souris, Manitoba. He has been a member of the Christian Heritage Party of Canada (CHP) since its formation in 1987, and was the president of its Manitoba division for three years. (The CHP does not run candidates at the provincial level.)

Electoral record
Election	Division	Party	Votes	%	Place	Winner
1997 federal	Brandon—Souris	Christian Heritage	229	0.62	6/6	Rick Borotsik, Progressive Conservative
2000 federal	Brandon—Souris	N/A (Christian Heritage)	94	0.26	6/6	Rick Borotsik, Progressive Conservative
2003 provincial	Minnedosa	Independent	106	1.54	4/4	Leanne Rowat, Progressive Conservative
2004 federal	Brandon—Souris	Christian Heritage	351	1.00	5/6	Merv Tweed, Conservative
2006 federal	Brandon—Souris	Christian Heritage	290	0.78	6/7	Merv Tweed, Conservative
2007 provincial	Minnedosa	Independent	70	1.00	5/5	Leanne Rowat, Progressive Conservative
