= J. J. Atkins =

J. J. Atkins registered as the T.J. Smith Stakes
- Class: Group 1
- Location: Eagle Farm Racecourse; Brisbane, Australia
- Inaugurated: 1893 (as The Claret Stakes)
- Race type: Thoroughbred - Flat racing
- Sponsor: Trackside NZ (2026)

Race information
- Distance: 1,600 metres
- Surface: Turf
- Track: Right-handed
- Qualification: Two year old
- Weight: Set Weights; Colts and geldings – 57 kg Fillies – 55 kg
- Purse: A$1,000,000 (2026)

The J. J. Atkins, registered as the T.J. Smith Stakes, is a Brisbane Racing Club Group 1 Thoroughbred horse race for two-year-olds run at set weights over a distance of 1600 metres at Eagle Farm Racecourse, Brisbane in June during the Queensland Winter Racing Carnival.

== History ==
The race was long considered the premier two-year-old race of the Brisbane Winter Carnival. It has been renamed several times since its inaugural running as The Claret Stakes. In 1999 the race name was renamed after legendary trainer T.J. Smith. In 2013 the race was once again renamed to honour Queensland trainer Jim Atkins who won every major staying race in the Brisbane area except a QTC Oaks - a race in which he had seven minor placegetters. He won the Brisbane premiership four times.

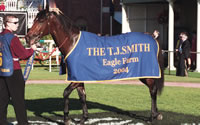
Outback Prince, winner of the 2004 T J Smith

=== Name ===
- 1893–1975 - Claret Stakes
- 1976–1982 - Marlboro Stakes
- 1983–1987 - Castlemaine Stakes
- 1988 - Channel Nine Stakes
- 1989–1994 - Castlemaine Stakes
- 1995–1998 - Q.T.C. Classic
- 1999–2012 - The T. J. Smith
- 2013 onwards - J. J. Atkins

=== Grade ===
- 1893–1979 - Principal Race
- 1980–1984 - Group 2
- 1985 onwards - Group 1

=== Distance ===
- 1893–1904 - 6 furlongs (~1200 metres)
- 1905–1954 - 7 furlongs (~1400 metres)
- 1955–1972 - 1 mile (~1600 metres)
- 1973 onwards - 1600 metres

=== Venue ===
Due to track reconstruction of Eagle Farm Racecourse for the 2014–15 racing season the event was transferred to Doomben Racecourse.

- 2015 - Doomben Racecourse
- 2017 - Doomben Racecourse
- 2018 - Doomben Racecourse

== Winners ==
The following are winners of the race.

- 2026 - Tron Bolt
- 2025 - Cool Archie
- 2024 - Broadsiding
- 2023 - King Colorado
- 2022 - Sheeza Belter
- 2021 - Converge
- 2020 - Rothfire
- 2019 - Prince Fawaz
- 2018 - The Autumn Sun
- 2017 - Capital Gain
- 2016 - Sacred Elixir
- 2015 - Press Statement
- 2014 - Almalad
- 2013 - Romantic Touch
- 2012 - Sizzling
- 2011 - Benfica
- 2010 - Pressday
- 2009 - Linky Dink
- 2008 - Rockdale
- 2007 - Apercu
- 2006 - Reigning To Win
- 2005 - Darci Brahma
- 2004 - Outback Prince
- 2003 - Picaday
- 2002 - Lovely Jubly
- 2001 - Juanmo
- 2000 - Show A Heart
- 1999 - Freemason
- 1998 - Mossman
- 1997 - Al Mansour
- 1996 - Anthems
- 1995 - Ravarda
- 1994 - Just A Printer
- 1993 - Mahogany
- 1992 - Slight Chance
- 1991 - Zinders
- 1990 - Chime Zam
- 1989 - Prince Salieri
- 1988 - Zeditave
- 1987 - Flotilla
- 1986 - One Guinea
- 1985 - Tristram's Edition
- 1984 - Prince Frolic
- 1983 - Regal Advice
- 1982 - Anchor In
- 1981 - Copperama
- 1980 - Royal Paree
- 1979 - Zephyr Zi
- 1978 - Scomeld
- 1977 - Luskin Star
- 1976 - Romantic Dream
- 1975 - Polenza
- 1974 - Knight Reign
- 1973 - †Light Appeal/Dalrello
- 1972 - †Alostar/Femme Fatale
- 1971 - †Manilove/Hot Head
- 1970 - †Kusarawa/West Coast
- 1969 - †Belle Of Burgundy/Forward Pass
- 1968 - Desert Beau
- 1967 - Quick Dollar
- 1966 - Rushkhana
- 1965 - Neive's Choice
- 1964 - Scolvin
- 1963 - Skeencourt
- 1962 - Arrogant Boy
- 1961 - Bush Belle
- 1960 - Le Storm
- 1959 - Greenwood Star
- 1958 - Espalier
- 1957 - Karunda
- 1956 - Chilly Glance
- 1955 - Royal Gaekwar
- 1954 - †Beau Moon/Faith Again
- 1953 - Callide River
- 1952 - West Lake
- 1951 - Khazana
- 1950 - Ninth Mark
- 1949 - Mr. Sunray
- 1948 - Naispear
- 1947 - Gold Titan
- 1946 - Gay Stand
- 1942–45 - race not held
- 1941 - Lord Spear
- 1940 - Rex Buzz
- 1939 - Spearace
- 1938 - Karait
- 1937 - Donarium
- 1936 - Monash River
- 1935 - Buzzard King
- 1934 - Linart
- 1933 - Utterer
- 1932 - Scottish Airs
- 1931 - Morning Carol
- 1930 - Monash Valley
- 1929 - Lady Bine
- 1928 - Ambershire
- 1927 - The Kist
- 1926 - Oedipus
- 1925 - Taupo
- 1924 - Civetta
- 1923 - Bribie
- 1922 - Rabisu
- 1921 - Admetus
- 1920 - Litre
- 1919 - Eudor Furly
- 1918 - Had I Wist
- 1917 - Rose Et Noir
- 1916 - Amberdown
- 1915 - Irish Colleen
- 1914 - Lado
- 1913 - Rose O' Merton
- 1912 - Bronze King
- 1911 - Yeena Lad
- 1910 - Cowl
- 1909 - Braw Laddie
- 1908 - Barallan
- 1907 - Capture
- 1906 - Inglewood
- 1905 - Volant
- 1904 - Archives
- 1903 - Fitz Grafton
- 1902 - Ivan
- 1901 - The Maine
- 1900 - Araxes
- 1899 - Arc En Ciel
- 1898 - Boreas II
- 1897 - Boscobel
- 1896 - College Cap
- 1895 - Caesar
- 1894 - Duke Of York
- 1893 - Common

† Run in Divisions

- Almalad was later renamed Friends of Ka Ying

== See also ==
- Brisbane Cup
- Dane Ripper Stakes
- Gunsynd Classic
- Stradbroke Handicap
- The Q22 (Eagle Farm Cup / P J O'Shea Stakes)
- Queensland Derby
- Queensland Guineas
- List of Australian Group races
- Group races
