= Ella Atkins =

American aerospace engineer

Ella Marie Atkins is an American aerospace engineer whose research involves flight planning and the coordination of multiple unmanned aerial vehicles. She is a head of the Kevin T. Crofton Department of Aerospace and Ocean Engineering at Virginia Tech, where she holds the Fred D. Durham Chair in Engineering, and is the editor-in-chief of the Journal of Aerospace Information Systems.

Atkins in 2015

== Early life and education ==
Atkins is originally from Summers County, West Virginia, where her father, Mason Atkins, worked as a farmer, farm equipment salesman, and local politician. She went to Hinton High School. As a young student she participated in the Study of Mathematically Precocious Youth, learning mathematics under the mentorship of a Johns Hopkins University graduate student. Later, as a high school senior, she was the winner of the 1984 West Virginia Junior Miss competition, and won the scholastic achievement category in the national competition.

She became an undergraduate at the Massachusetts Institute of Technology, where she earned bachelor's and master's degrees in MIT's program in Aeronautics & Astronautics in 1988 and 1990, respectively. Continuing her graduate study in the program in Computer Science & Engineering at the University of Michigan, she earned a second master's degree in 1995, and completed her Ph.D. in 1999. Her dissertation, Plan Generation and Hard Real-time Execution with Application to Safe, Autonomous Flight, was jointly supervised by Kang G. Shin and Edmund H. Durfee.

== Academic career ==
She became an assistant professor of aerospace engineering at the University of Maryland, College Park from 1999 to 2006, before returning to the University of Michigan as an associate professor in the Department of Aerospace Engineering in 2006. At Michigan, she became a professor, the director of the Autonomous Aerospace Systems Laboratory, and the associate director of the University of Michigan Robotics Institute. In 2022, she moved again, to Virginia Tech, as head of the Kevin T. Crofton Department of Aerospace and Ocean Engineering and Fred D. Durham Chair in Engineering.

She is the editor-in-chief of the Journal of Aerospace Information Systems, published by the American Institute of Aeronautics and Astronautics.

== Recognition ==
Atkins was named a Fellow of the American Institute of Aeronautics and Astronautics in 2019. She was the 2022 recipient of the AIAA Intelligent Systems Award.
