= Queensland Guineas =

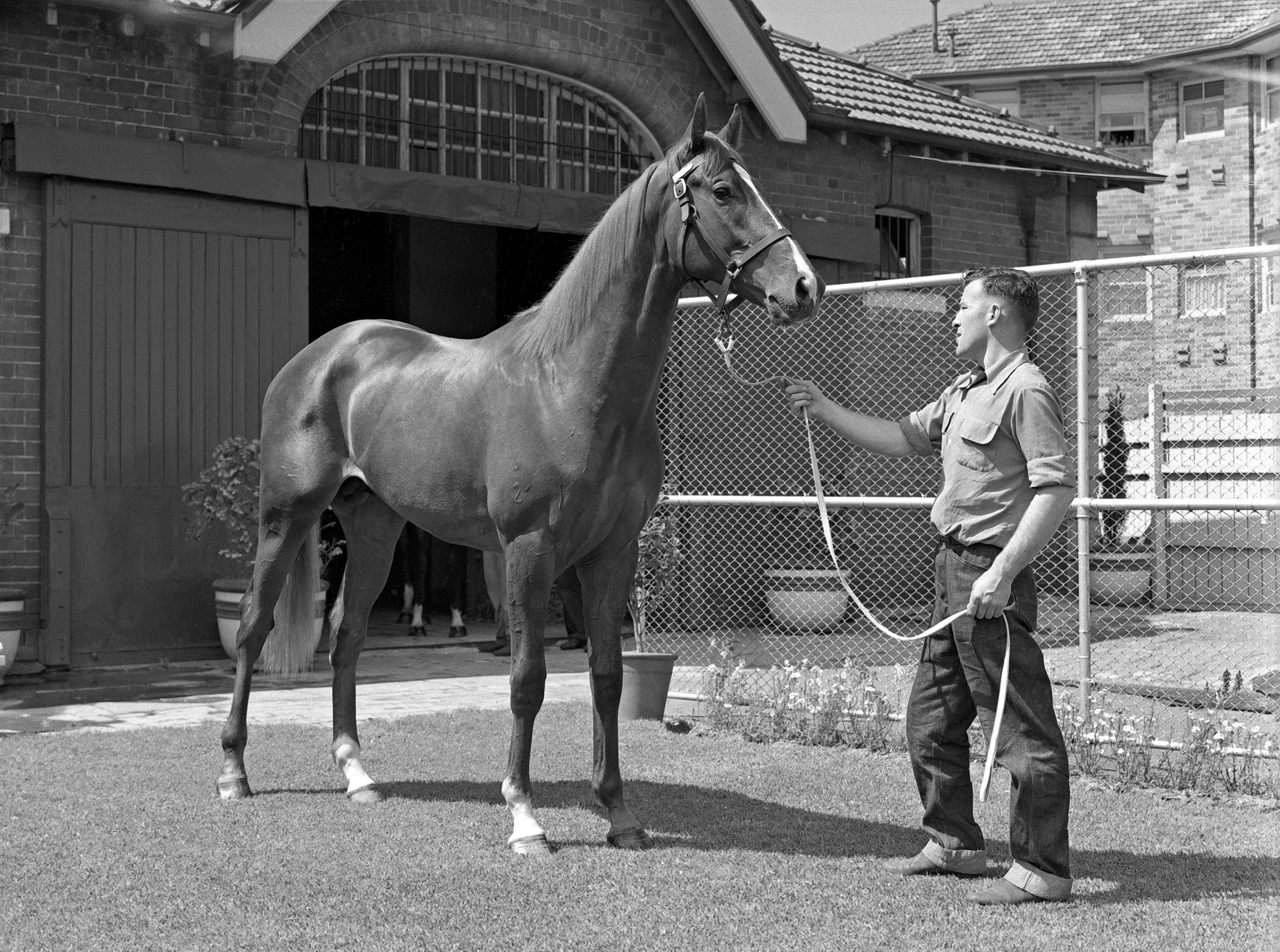
- Aboukir, 1955 winner
- Class: Group 2
- Location: Eagle Farm Racecourse; Brisbane, Australia
- Inaugurated: 1896
- Race type: Thoroughbred - Flat racing
- Sponsor: Ticketmaster (2026)

Race information
- Distance: 1,600 metres
- Surface: Turf
- Track: Right-handed
- Qualification: Three year old
- Weight: Set Weights; Colts and geldings – 57 kg Fillies – 55 kg
- Purse: A$350,000 (2026)

The Queensland Guineas is a Brisbane Racing Club Group 2 Thoroughbred horse race held over 1600 metres, at set weights, for three-year-old horses held at Eagle Farm Racecourse in Brisbane, Australia in June during the Queensland Winter Racing Carnival.

Due to track reconstruction of Eagle Farm Racecourse for the 2014–15 racing season the event was transferred to Doomben Racecourse.

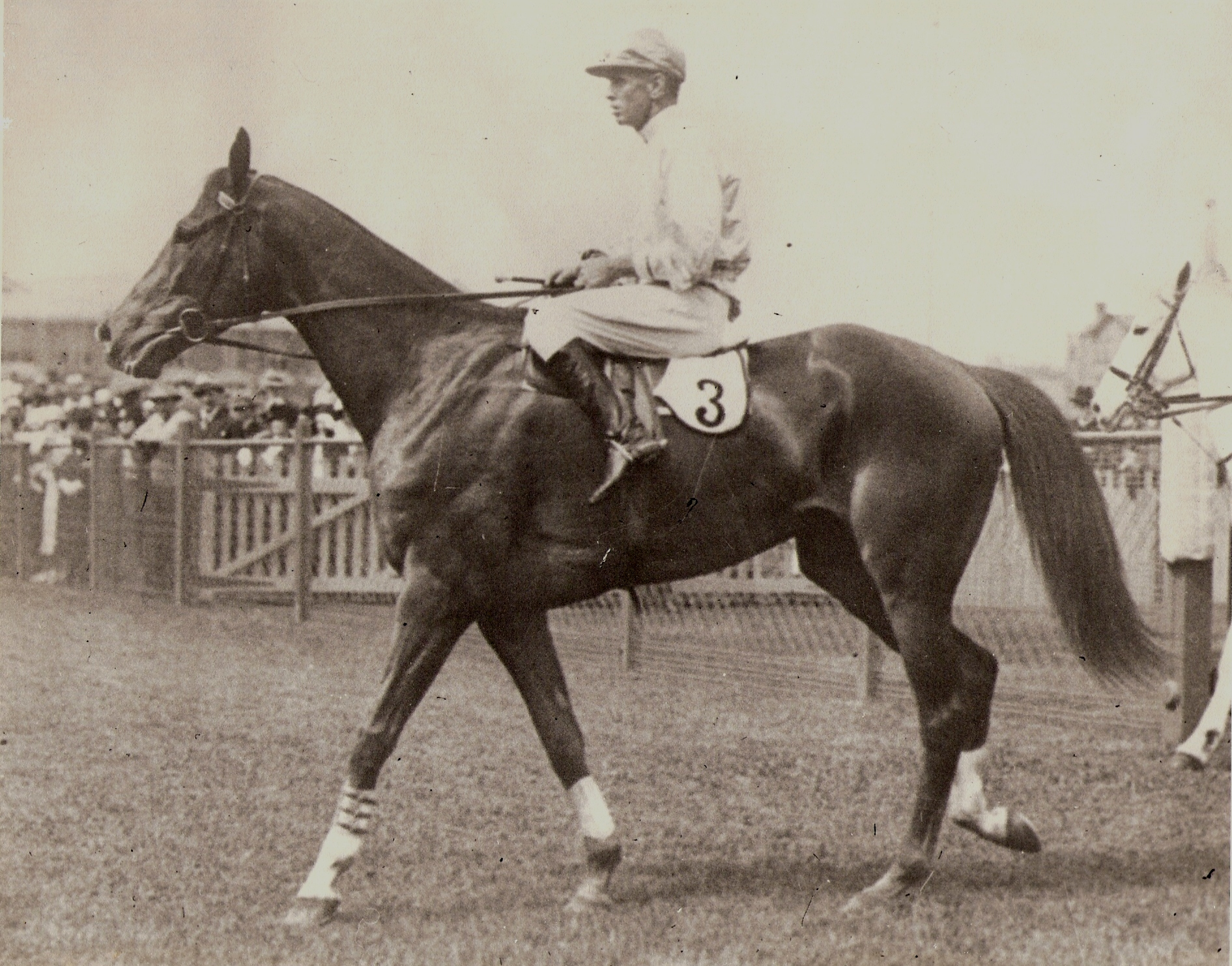
Lough Neagh, 1931 winner

== History ==
Prior to 2005 the race was held in early May. From 2006 to 2008 the race was held on the Queen's Birthday holiday in June. Since 2009 it is held in early June.

=== Grade ===
- 1896–1978 - Principal race
- 1979–1987 - Group 3
- 1988 onwards - Group 2 race

=== Distance ===
- 1896–1972 - 1 mile
- 1973–2011 – 1600 metres
- 2012–2014 – 1400 metres
- 2015 – 1600 metres

=== Other venues ===
- 2017 Doomben Racecourse
- 2018 Doomben Racecourse

=== Recent multiple winners ===
Trainers

- Chris Waller in 2016, 2018, 2019 and 2023.
- Gerald Ryan in 2000, 2002, 2005 and 2010

Jockeys

- Stathi Katsidis in 2001 and 2007

== Winners ==
The following are past winners of the race.

- 2026 - Brave Monarch
- 2025 - Depth Of Character
- 2024 - Kintyre
- 2023 - Kovalica
- 2022 - Character
- 2021 - Private Eye
- 2020 - ‡race not held
- 2019 - Kolding
- 2018 - Sambro
- 2017 - Salsonic
- 2016 - Tsaritsa
- 2015 - Jabali
- 2014 - Sir Moments
- 2013 - Sizzling
- 2012 - Pear Tart
- 2011 - Torio's Quest
- 2010 - Rothesay
- 2009 - Express Air
- 2008 - Turffontein
- 2007 - Sequential Charm
- 2006 - Nova Star
- 2005 - Saxon
- 2004 - Winning Belle
- 2003 - True Glo
- 2002 - Regent Street
- 2001 - Heroism
- 2000 - Magnifier
- 1999 - Camarena
- 1998 - Insecure
- 1997 - Yippyio
- 1996 - race not held
- 1995 - Turridu
- 1994 - Paris Lane
- 1993 - Cuidado
- 1992 - Coolong Road
- 1991 - Trisca
- 1990 - Solar Circle
- 1989 - Cole Diesel
- 1988 - Planet Ruler
- 1987 - Magic Flute
- 1986 - Persian World
- 1985 - Phoenix Rising
- 1984 - Vite Cheval
- 1983 - race not held
- 1982 - Star Of The Knight
- 1981 - Bermuda Bird
- 1980 - Cloud Pink
- 1979 - Zephyr Zip
- 1978 - He'll Do
- 1977 - Bay Duke
- 1976 - Night Charmer
- 1975 - Gentle Jim
- 1974 - Spinnelli
- 1973 - Dalrello
- 1972 - Beau Cera
- 1971 - Charlton Boy
- 1970 - Waminda
- 1969 - Paola Pisani
- 1968 - Flying Ace
- 1967 - Dual Control
- 1966 - Lord Kearsey
- 1965 - Maybe Lad
- 1964 - Rocky Court
- 1963 - Confidence
- 1962 - Persian King
- 1961 - Ivanhoe
- 1960 - Royal Bore
- 1959 - Countwood
- 1958 - Earlwood
- 1957 - Neptunist
- 1956 - Book Link
- 1955 - Aboukir
- 1954 - Cool Gent
- 1953 - Kev Mar
- 1952 - Kashmir
- 1951 - Friar's Frolic
- 1950 - Coniston
- 1949 - Mr. Sunray
- 1948 - Blue Slipper
- 1947 - Sefiona
- 1946 - Maytown
- 1942–45 - race not held
- 1941 - Felt Yet
- 1940 - Bold Step
- 1939 - Spearace
- 1938 - Seven Fifty
- 1937 - Spear Chief
- 1936 - Brownfelt
- 1935 - Auto Buz
- 1934 - Pandion
- 1933 - Soft Step
- 1932 - Some Cure
- 1931 - Lough Neagh
- 1930 - Irish Smile
- 1929 - Bernfield
- 1928 - Hourly
- 1927 - High Syce
- 1926 - Chryso
- 1925 - Taupo
- 1924 - Mountain Song
- 1923 - Ardglen
- 1922 - Kingslot
- 1921 - Ladomond
- 1920 - Syceonelle
- 1919 - Eudor Furly
- 1918 - Molly's Robe
- 1917 - Master Warkon
- 1916 - Lord Acre
- 1915 - Irish Colleen
- 1914 - Delinacre
- 1913 - Lord Burnside
- 1912 - Koatanui
- 1911 - Yeena Lad
- 1910 - Havocorn
- 1909 - Mischief
- 1908 - Flaxen
- 1907 - Euroa
- 1906 - Headlight
- 1905 - Alexis
- 1904 - Joyance
- 1903 - Fitz Grafton
- 1902 - Balfour
- 1901 - Grattan
- 1900 - Araxes
- 1899 - Lauri
- 1898 - Boreas II
- 1897 - Boscobel
- 1896 - College Cap

‡ Not held because of the COVID-19 pandemic in Australia

== See also ==
- Brisbane Cup
- Dane Ripper Stakes
- J. J. Atkins
- Queensland Derby
- Stradbroke Handicap
- Victory Stakes
- List of Australian Group races
- Group races
