= Sir Henry Atkins, 5th Baronet =

English baronet from 1728 until 1742

Sir Henry Atkins 5th Baronet of Clapham
- Born: 1726; Clapham
- Died: 1 September 1742 (aged 16); Clapham

Sir Henry Atkins, 5th Baronet (1726–1742), of Clapham, was an English baronet from 1728 until 1742.

== Education ==
He was educated at John Roysse's Free School in Abingdon, (now Abingdon School) c.1732-c.1739. His name appears on the 1732 School Roll.

== Title ==
Following the death of his father Sir Henry Atkins, 4th Baronet he became the 5th Atkins baronet of Clapham, at the age of just two years old. He died at the young age of 16 in 1742.

== See also ==
- List of Old Abingdonians

Baronetage of England
Preceded by Henry Atkins	Baronet (of Clapham); 1728–1742	Succeeded by Richard Atkins
