= Ruth Atkins =

Australian political scientist (1911–1984)

Ruth Ethel Atkins (1911–1984) was an Australian political scientist, academic and author. In 1952, she became the first woman to be employed as an academic by the New South Wales University of Technology (later University of New South Wales).

== Early life and education ==
Atkins was born in 1911, daughter of Ernest Baldwin and Ethel Atkins. She studied English (Class III honours), philosophy and history at the University of Sydney, graduating with a BA in 1932. To gain experience in economics, she undertook research for Professor Sydney James Butlin.

== Career ==
Following graduation, Atkins' first job was as a teacher at Guildford Infants School in Sydney in 1933. In the 1940s she gave lectures for the Workers' Education Association. In March 1949 she resigned from her teaching position at Homebush Boys' High School to work as a part-time government and political lecturer at the University of Sydney. She left that position in December 1949 to further her career at the London School of Economics, where she worked as a tutor and researcher in trade unionism.

Returning to Australia, in 1952, Atkins became the first woman to be employed as a lecturer by the New South Wales University of Technology (later University of New South Wales).

She was promoted to Associate Professor in 1965 and retired in 1973.

Atkins died in March 1984 and was cremated.

== Selected publications ==
- Atkins, Ruth (1950). The Webb Local Government Collection : report of investigation made May-September 1950.
- Atkins, Ruth; Graycar, Adam (1972). Governing Australia. Sydney Wiley. ISBN 978-0-471-03614-2.
- Atkins, Ruth (1978). The government of the Australian Capital Territory. University of Queensland Press. ISBN 0702214302.
- Atkins, Ruth (1979). Albany to Zeehan : a new look at local governments. Law Book Co. ISBN 978-0-455-19874-3.
