= Sir Richard Atkins, 6th Baronet =

English baronet from 1742 until 1756

Sir Richard Atkins 6th & last Baronet of Clapham
- Born: 1728; Clapham
- Died: 10 June 1756 (aged 27-28); Clapham

Sir Richard Atkins, 6th Baronet (1728–1756), of Clapham, was an English baronet from 1742 until 1756.

== Education ==
He was educated at John Roysse's Free School in Abingdon, (now Abingdon School) c.1737-c.1742.

== Title ==
Following the death of his older brother Sir Henry Atkins, 5th Baronet in 1742 he became the 6th and last Atkins baronet of Clapham, at the age of 14 but did not receive the estates from the trustees until coming of age in 1749. He was awarded an honorary degree in 1749 by the University of Oxford and was High Sheriff of Buckinghamshire (1750-1751).

It is reputed that he bought the services of the leading courtesan Kitty Fisher and that he accumulated debts. He died, married to Fanny Murray, without children which ended the baronetcy and his Tickford estates were sold to pay off his debts.

He was a Steward of the OA Club in 1748.

Baronetage of England
Preceded by Henry Atkins	Baronet (of Clapham); 1742–1756	Extinct
Political offices
Preceded by Alexander Townsend	High Sheriff of Buckinghamshire; 1750-51	Succeeded by Henry Lovibond

== See also ==
- List of Old Abingdonians
