= Atkins baronets =

Title in the Baronetage of England

- Escutcheon of the Atkins baronets of Clapham
- Creation date: 1660
- Status: extinct
- Extinction date: 1756

The Atkins Baronetcy, of Clapham in the County of Surrey, was a title in the Baronetage of England. It was created on 13 June 1660 for Richard Atkins. The second Baronet sat as Member of Parliament for Buckinghamshire. The title became extinct on the death of the sixth Baronet in 1756.

== Atkins baronets, of Clapham (1660) ==
- Sir Richard Atkins, 1st Baronet (c. 1615–1689)
- Sir Richard Atkins, 2nd Baronet (1654–1696)
- Sir Henry Atkins, 3rd Baronet (1684–1712)
- Sir Henry Atkins, 4th Baronet (1707–1728)
- Sir Henry Atkins, 5th Baronet (1726–1742)
- Sir Richard Atkins, 6th Baronet (1728–1756)
