= Taiwan, Hong Kong and Macao =

Term used by the People's Republic of China

Taiwan, Hong Kong and Macao (Chinese: 台港澳; pinyin: Táigǎng'ào), also known as Hong Kong, Macao and Taiwan (港澳台; Gǎng'àotái), is the collective term used by the People's Republic of China (PRC) for its two special administrative regions, Hong Kong and Macao, as well as the Taiwan region, which is claimed by the PRC as its sovereign territory but is governed by the Government of the Republic of China (termed the "Taiwan authorities" by the PRC). These areas are also referred to as the "three regions of Taiwan, Hong Kong, and Macau." The permanent residents of these three regions are known as "compatriots of Hong Kong, Macau, and Taiwan" or "residents of Hong Kong, Macau, and Taiwan," and are considered by the government of the People's Republic of China as part of the broader Chinese nationality. Hong Kong and Macau apply the "one country, two systems" policy and all three have significant differences from mainland China, possessing special status under the laws of the People's Republic of China.

== Overview ==
During the final years of the Qing dynasty, due to weakened national strength and military defeats, China was forced to sign unequal treaties that ceded three territories to foreign powers: the Treaty of Tientsin ceded Macau to Portugal as a colony, the Treaty of Nanking ceded Hong Kong to Britain as a colony, and the Treaty of Shimonoseki ceded Taiwan to Japan as a colony. In 1945, at the end of World War II, the Nationalist government of China received Taiwan back from the defeated Empire of Japan.

In 1949, after being defeated in the Chinese Civil War, the government of the Republic of China (ROC) retreated to Taiwan, while the People's Republic of China (PRC) was established in Beijing. The two governments do not recognize each other and each claims sovereignty over all of China, leading to a factual division across the Taiwan Strait. Since Hong Kong and Macau were not governed by either side at that time, and both sides claimed sovereignty over these regions, these two areas became buffer zones for cross-strait interactions. Hong Kong was returned to the People's Republic of China in 1997, and Macau in 1999, both becoming Special Administrative Regions under the "One Country, Two Systems" framework.

Since Xi Jinping became the General Secretary of the Chinese Communist Party in 2012, special legal treatments have been provided for the Taiwan, Hong Kong, and Macau regions. The Ministry of Commerce of the PRC established a Department for Taiwan, Hong Kong, and Macau Affairs, and various local governments have also set up offices specifically for handling matters related to these regions. Chinese universities offer independent admission channels for residents from Hong Kong, Macau, and Taiwan, as well as for overseas Chinese. Additionally, the Beijing University of Chinese Medicine has established a department specifically for students from these three regions to study Traditional Chinese Medicine.

== History ==
In 2003, the State Council of the People's Republic of China established the Ministry of Commerce, under which the Department for Taiwan, Hong Kong, and Macau Affairs was created to manage trade and investment relations with these regions uniformly.

In 2018, the Central Committee of the Chinese Communist Party proposed an institutional reform plan. The State Council of the People's Republic of China approved the "Measures for the Application and Issuance of Residence Permits for Residents of Hong Kong, Macao, and Taiwan," which is used to manage residents from these regions. Shandong Province and the Ningxia Hui Autonomous Region established the CCP Shandong Provincial Committee Taiwan, Hong Kong, and Macau Office and the CCP Ningxia Hui Autonomous Region Party Committee Office for Hong Kong, Macau, and Taiwan Affairs, respectively. In Fujian Province, the Fujian Provincial People's Government Office for Taiwan, Hong Kong, and Macau Affairs was established. In 2023, in response to the establishment of the Fujian Pilot Free Trade Zone, the Fujian Province Office for Taiwan, Hong Kong, and Macau Affairs was split into the Fujian Province Taiwan Affairs Office and the Fujian Province Hong Kong and Macau Affairs Office.

In 2023, the Fourteenth Standing Committee of the National People's Congress passed the "People's Republic of China Law on Patriotism Education", which applies not only to residents of mainland China but also to those from the Taiwan, Hong Kong, and Macau regions.

== See also ==
- Hong Kong and Macao
- Cross-strait relations
- Hong Kong–Macau relations
- Hong Kong–mainland China relations
- Macau–mainland China relations
- Hong Kong–Taiwan relations
- Macau–Taiwan relations
- Greater China
