= Hong Kong and Macau =

Hong Kong and Macau are the two special administrative regions of China. Together, they may refer to:

- Taiwan, Hong Kong and Macao
  - Hong Kong–Macau relations
    - Hong Kong–Macau Interport
    - Hong Kong–Macau cultural exchange
    - Hong Kong–Macau Ferry Terminal
    - Hong Kong–Macau Trophy
  - One country, two systems
    - Hong Kong and Macao Affairs Office
    - Exit and Entry Administration of the People's Republic of China
      - Hong Kong and Macao Travel Permit
      - Permit for Proceeding to Hong Kong and Macao
      - Mainland Travel Permit for Hong Kong and Macao Residents
      - Residence Permit for Hong Kong, Macao, and Taiwan Residents
- Guangdong–Hong Kong–Macao Greater Bay Area
  - Hong Kong–Zhuhai–Macau Bridge
