= Macau–mainland China relations =

Bilateral relations

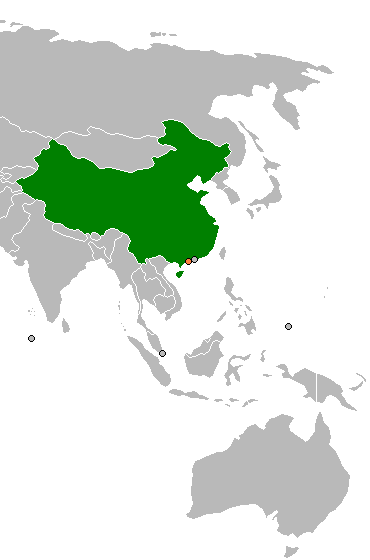
- mainland China: Macau

Diplomatic mission
- Macau Liaison Office, OCMFA (Macau): Macau Office in Beijing

Macau–mainland China relations refer to the relationship between mainland China and Macau. In 1999, Portugal transferred sovereignty over Macau to the People's Republic of China and established a special administrative region in accordance with the Sino-Portuguese Joint Declaration. Macau enjoys a high degree of autonomy in accordance with the Basic Law of Macao.

== Cooperation ==
The Outline of the 12th Five-Year Plan for National Economic and Social Development of the People's Republic of China, promulgated in March 2011, clearly stated the country's support for deepening economic cooperation between the Mainland and Macau, the continued implementation of CEPA, and defined the important functions of Guangdong-Macau cooperation in the Framework Agreement on Guangdong-Macao Cooperation. At present, the Hong Kong Government has the following platforms for the HKSAR Government to participate in regional co-operation in the Mainland:

1. The Guangdong-Macao Cooperation Joint Conference;
2. Zhuhai-Macao Cooperation Conference;
3. Pan-Pearl River Delta Regional Cooperation and Development Forum;
4. Beijing-Macao Economic and Trade Co-operation Conference;
5. Hong Kong and Macao Co-operation High Level Meeting and related contents; (See Hong Kong–Macau Relations)

Through these platforms, Macao and the Mainland can carry out co-operation in areas such as cross-boundary infrastructure, facilitation measures to facilitate the flow of people and goods, business and investment promotion, environmental protection, food safety, information technology, urban development, tourism cooperation, exchange of cultural activities, promotion of sports events, and training of rehabilitation personnel.

Starting from 1 November 2022, the Exit-Entry Administration Bureau of the Ministry of Public Security of the People's Republic of China has launched the Smart Endorsement Device to accept applications for travel endorsements to Macao from Mainland residents.

== See also ==
- Hong Kong–Macau relations
- Hong Kong–mainland China relations
- Macau–Taiwan relations
