= George Moore Stakes =

- Class: Group 3
- Location: Doomben Racecourse
- Inaugurated: 1979 (as XXXX Stakes)
- Race type: Thoroughbred
- Sponsor: Ladbrokes (2023-25)

Race information
- Distance: 1,200 metres
- Surface: Turf
- Track: Right-handed
- Qualification: Open
- Weight: Quality handicap
- Purse: A$200,000 (2025)

The George Moore Stakes is a Brisbane Racing Club Group 3 Thoroughbred open quality handicap, over a distance of 1200 metres, held at Doomben Racecourse in Brisbane, Australia in December.

== History ==
The current naming of the race is after the champion international jockey and horse trainer George Moore (1923–2008), who began his career in Brisbane. Amongst his many achievements he won the Doomben 10,000 which is held at the same track as this race a record five times. Takeover Target established the new track record of 1.07.88 for the 1200 metres in winning the race in 2005.

=== Name ===
- 1979–1986 - XXXX Stakes
- 1987 - Thornhill Park Stakes
- 1988 - L J Williams Quality Handicap
- 1989 - Summer Stakes
- 1990–1992 L J Williams Quality Handicap
- 1993 - Summer Stakes
- 1994–1999 - AWA Stakes
- 2000–2006 - Summer Stakes
- 2008 onwards - George Moore Stakes

=== Grade ===
- 1979–1982 - Group 3
- 1983–2000 - Listed race
- 2001 onwards - Group 3

=== Venue ===
- 1979–2015 - Doomben Racecourse
- 2016 - Eagle Farm Racecourse
- 2017 onwards - Doomben Racecourse

== Winners ==
The following are past winners of the race.

- 2025 - Caballus
- 2024 - Hidden Wealth
- 2023 - Zoustyle
- 2022 - Garibaldi
- 2021 - Zoustyle
- 2020 - Hard Empire
- 2019 - Chapter And Verse
- 2018 - I'm A Rippa
- 2017 - Monsieur Gustave
- 2016 - Most Important
- 2015 - Didntcostalot
- 2014 - Big Money
- 2013 - Lucky Hussler
- 2012 - Startsmeup
- 2011 - Adebisi
- 2010 - † race not held
- 2009 - Burdekin Blues
- 2008 - Friendly Embrace
- 2007 - ‡ race not held
- 2006 - Natural Destiny
- 2005 - Takeover Target
- 2004 - Show Biz Kid
- 2003 - Make Mine Magic
- 2002 - Baal Yabba
- 2001 - Alpine Express
- 2000 - Fine Action
- 1999 - Major Victory
- 1998 - City Hall
- 1997 - Chief De Beers
- 1996 - Rip Home
- 1995 - Atlantic Crossing
- 1994 - Chief De Beers
- 1993 - Morden
- 1992 - Buck's Pride
- 1991 - Turvey
- 1990 - Gypsy Rogue
- 1989 - Mirraben
- 1989 - Mirraben
- 1987 - Mirraben
- 1986 - Paris Beau
- 1985 - Basic French
- 1984 - Fixed Flush
- 1983 - Foreign Interest
- 1982 - Marquee Star
- 1981 - Handsome Prince
- 1980 - Grand Rocky
- 1979 - Princess Reichen

† Meeting at Doomben was abandoned after the sixth race due to inclement weather.
‡ The race was not run due to equine influenza.

== See also ==
- List of Australian Group races
- Group races
