= George Moore (jockey) =

Australian champion jockey

George Moore OBE
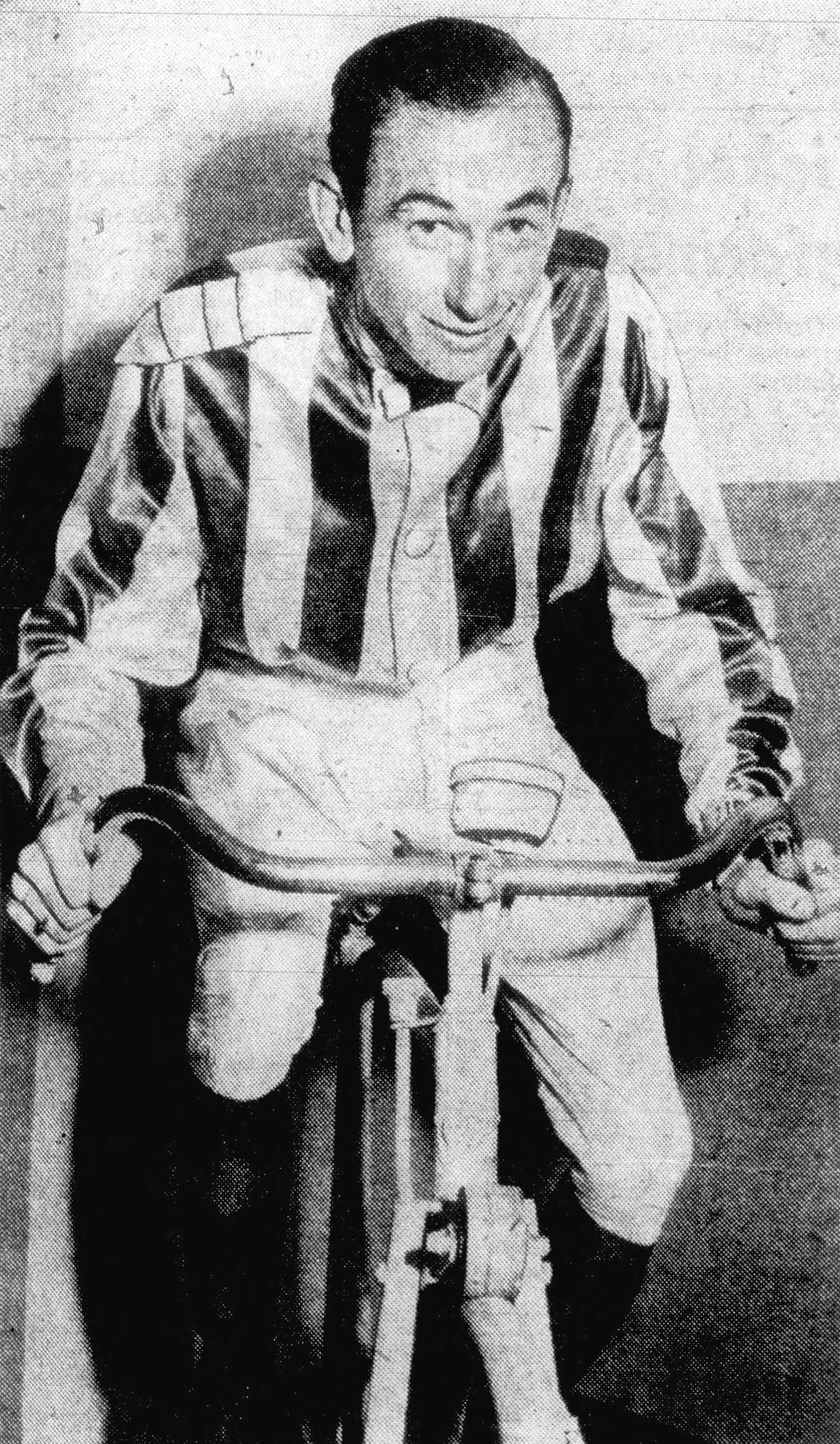
- Moore, circa 1950

Personal information
- Born: 5 July 1923 Mackay, Queensland
- Died: 8 January 2008 (aged 84) Sydney
- Occupation: Jockey / Trainer

Horse racing career
- Sport: Horse racing
- Career wins: 2,278, his win percentage was 33%.

Major racing wins
- Doomben 10,000 (1940, 1953, 1957, 1969, 1971); Sydney Cup (1946, 1966, 1968); AJC Railway Handicap (1946, 1965, 1971); AJC Metropolitan (1946); AJC Sires (1948, 1957, 1958, 1963, 1965, 1970); Doncaster Handicap (1948, 1966, 1971); AJC Derby (1949, 1957, 1962, 1963, 1971); Doomben Cup (1949, 1953, 1958); George Main Stakes (1949, 1953, 1957, 1961) (1964, 1965, 1966, 1969, 1970); Canterbury Guineas (1951, 1956, 1961, 1962, 1963, 1966); Queen Elizabeth Stakes (1951, 1953, 1958, 1961, 1963, 1966, 1968); Stradbroke Handicap (1951, 1961, 1962); Queensland Derby (1951, 1957, 1960); Rosehill Guineas (1952, 1957, 1958); Rawson Stakes (1952, 1953, 1958, 1961, 1962, 1963); VRC Oaks (1952); AJC Oaks (1953, 1969, 1971); Mackinnon Stakes (1953, 1961, 1963, 1969); Caulfield Guineas (1957, 1961, 1963); Cox Plate (1957, 1968); VRC Derby (1957, 1971); Chipping Norton Stakes (1958, 1966, 1970); All Aged Stakes (1958, 1964, 1969); Queensland Oaks (1958, 1961); Brisbane Cup (1961); Futurity Stakes (1961); Epsom Handicap (1961, 1966); Caulfield Stakes (1961, 1962); VRC Sires Produce Stakes (1962); Champagne Stakes (1963, 1968, 1970); VRC 1000 Guineas (1964); Australian Cup (1969); Golden Slipper Stakes (1970, 1971); Newmarket Handicap (1970, 1971) International race wins: San Diego Handicap (1950); Prix de l'Arc de Triomphe (1959); 2,000 Guineas (1959, 1967); Irish 1000 Guineas (1959); Eclipse Stakes (1959); Middle Park Stakes (1959); Prix du Jockey Club (1960); Prix Lupin (1960); Grand Prix de Paris (1960); Ascot Gold Cup (1960); Sussex Stakes (1960); Epsom Derby (1967); 1,000 Guineas (1967); George VI & Elizabeth II Stakes (1967) As a trainer: Hong Kong Champions & Chater Cup (1975, 1976, 1977, 1979, 1981); Queen Elizabeth II Cup (1976); Hong Kong Stewards' Cup (1979, 1984); Hong Kong Gold Cup (1980, 1981); Hong Kong Derby (1980, 1981); Hong Kong Classic Mile (1981)

Racing awards
- BBC Overseas Sports Personality of the Year (1967); Sydney Jockeys' Premierships (10); Australian Racing Hall of Fame (2001); Australia Post Australian Legends (2007); As a trainer: Hong Kong Training Premierships (11)

Honours
- Sport Australia Hall of Fame (1986); George Moore Medal (1998); Australian Racing Hall of Fame (2001); Australia Post Australian Legends (2007); BRC Group 3 George Moore Stakes (2008– )

Significant horses
- Redcraze, Baguette, Fairy Walk, Tulloch; Royal Palace, Busted, Saint Crespin, Fleet, Taboun, Sheshoon, Charlottesville

George Thomas Donald Moore OBE (5 July 1923 – 8 January 2008) was an Australian jockey and Thoroughbred horse trainer. He began his career in racing in 1939 in Brisbane where he quickly became one of the top apprentice jockeys and where in 1943 he won the Senior Jockeys' Premiership. He then relocated to Sydney and in 1949 went to work for trainer Tommy J. Smith (also known as T.J. Smith) with whom he would have considerable success.

In 1950, at the invitation of Johnny Longden, Moore traveled to the United States where he won the San Diego Handicap at Del Mar Racetrack. In 1957 and 1958 George Moore won the Jockeys' Premiership at Sydney then in 1959 accepted an offer to ride in Europe for trainer/owner Alec Head of Haras du Quesnay and another major owner, Prince Aly Khan. There, he won the Prix du Jockey Club and the Prix de l'Arc de Triomphe, as well as a British Classic Race, the 2,000 Guineas. Returning to Sydney, Moore continued to win Jockeys' Premierships and in 1967 returned for a time to compete in Europe for trainer Noel Murless where he won the first three 1967 British Classics, the 1,000 Guineas, a second 2,000 Guineas, and his biggest win of all in British racing, the 1967 Epsom Derby.

In Australia, George Moore won numerous of the country's top races and was the jockey aboard Tulloch for nineteen of the Hall of Fame horse's thirty-six wins. He retired from riding in 1971 having won 312 metropolitan stakes and a record 119 Group One races. He then turned his talents to training, first in France, then in Australia and for thirteen seasons in Hong Kong where, between 1973 and 1985, he won the training premiership eleven times.

After the 1985 racing season George Moore retired to the Gold Coast. He died in Sydney on 8 January 2008.

== Honours ==
Moore was one of the most honoured men in Australian Thoroughbred racing history. He was appointed an Officer of the Order of the British Empire (OBE) in the 1972 New Year Honours and in 1986 was inducted into the newly created Sport Australia Hall of Fame.

In December 1998, Sydney Racing authorities created the George Moore Medal, to be given annually to the most outstanding jockey competing in Sydney.

In 2000, he was awarded the Australian Sports Medal "for outstanding commitment to Thoroughbred Racing". Moore was part of the 2001 inaugural class inducted into the Australian Racing Hall of Fame. In 2007, Australia Post placed his image on a postage stamp as part of its Australian Legends series.

In 2009, Moore was inducted into the Queensland Sport Hall of Fame.

Since 2008 the Brisbane Racing Club honours George Moore with a race in his name, the Group 3 George Moore Stakes at Doomben Racecourse in December.

== A racing family ==
George Moore's sister married jockey Garnet Bougoure. George's eldest son, John, worked as his assistant before going out on his own. John Moore carved out a successful career, winning five training titles in Hong Kong and in 2005 broke Brian Kan's record for most career wins by a trainer in Hong Kong racing. Recently he received international attention as the trainer of the world-ranked Viva Pataca.

Another son, Gary W. Moore, was a successful jockey who won seven Hong Kong riding championships. He also rode in Europe where his wins included the 1981 Prix de l'Arc de Triomphe on Gold River. In 1988, he rode the filly Ravinella to victory in the British Classic, the 1,000 Guineas, plus the French Poule d'Essai des Pouliches. Like his father, Gary Moore also turned to training after his riding career was over and in Taipa has twice won the Hong Kong Macau Trophy as champion trainer.

George Moore's youngest child, Michele Ann Moore, married French champion jockey Philippe Paquet. She subsequently married Australian jockey Peter Leyshan, who was a Sydney-based apprentice to TJ Smith. George took Peter with him to Hong Kong, where he was very successful, always finishing in the top 3. He won the Gold Coast Racing Club's riding title in 1992 and 1993. After his riding career was over, he too turned to training. In 1996 Peter Leyshan took out a trainer's licence with the Macau Jockey Club, and has won the Hong Kong Macau Trophy, Macau Derby, Gold Cup & most of the Big races in Macau, as a Macau champion trainer.

Michele was George's assistant trainer, and when her father retired, became Peter's assistant. Michele and Peter have 4 children. Philippe, Christina, Sarah & Amanda. Christina is married to Jason Lee and they have 3 children.
