= Global Sprint Challenge =

Horse racing series

The Global Sprint Challenge is a Thoroughbred horse racing series inaugurated in 2005 as a series of six sprint races run across three racing jurisdictions in Australia, England and Japan. In 2006 the series expanded to seven races across four racing jurisdictions with the inclusion of a race in Hong Kong. In 2008 the series expanded to eight races when an additional race in England became part of the series and in 2011 the series expands to nine races with the inclusion of a race in Singapore.

- The Champion Sprinter trophy is awarded to the connections of the horse that accumulates 42 points or more in a single season, and participates in challenge races in at least three countries.
- The Global Sprint Challenge Champion is eligible to win a $US1,000,000 bonus for connections, provided the champion wins a minimum of three Group 1 races in the series in three countries other than their own racing jurisdiction. Important changes to the series for 2009 will see the $US1,000,000 bonus being split $US750,000 to the owner and $US250,000 to the trainer and there is now no necessity to race in all four countries to be eligible for the bonus.

== Challenge history ==
2005 – Inauguration of six race series
2006 – Series expanded to seven races with the inclusion of the Hong Kong International Sprint
2006 – $US1,000,000 bonus incentive added to series
2008 – King's Stand Stakes upgraded to Group 1 from Group 2
2008 – Series expanded to eight races with the inclusion of the July Cup
2008 – The Age Classic replaces the Australia Stakes as the second Australian leg of the series
2011 – Series expanded to nine races with the inclusion of the KrisFlyer International Sprint
2011 – The Takamatsunomiya Kinen replaces the Centaur Stakes as the first Japanese leg of the series
2012 – Series expanded to ten races with the inclusion of the Dubai Golden Shaheen
2016 – Series expanded to ten races with the inclusion of the Chairman's Sprint Prize
2017 - Al Quoz Sprint replaced the Dubai Golden Shaheen, meaning that all ten races will be run on turf

The 2018 series was suspended due to an ongoing dispute between the racing authorities in Australia and Hong Kong over quarantine arrangements.

== Global Sprint Challenge races ==
All races are Group / Grade One events run on turf.

- Lightning Stakes at Flemington Racecourse
- Takamatsunomiya Kinen at Chukyo Racecourse (2011 run at Hanshin Racecourse)
- Al Quoz Sprint at Meydan Racecourse
- Chairman's Sprint Prize at Sha Tin Racecourse
- King's Stand Stakes at Royal Ascot
- Diamond Jubilee Stakes at Royal Ascot
- July Cup at Newmarket Racecourse
- Sprinters Stakes at Nakayama Racecourse
- VRC Sprint Classic at Flemington Racecourse
- Hong Kong Sprint at Sha Tin Racecourse

== The Challenge Winners ==
- 2005 – Cape of Good Hope
- 2006 – Takeover Target
- 2007 – Miss Andretti *
- 2008 – Apache Cat *
- 2009 – Scenic Blast *
- 2010 – Starspangledbanner *

* Champion Sprinter trophy not awarded
