= Green Birdie =

New Zealand-bred Thoroughbred racehorse

- Sire: Catbird
- Dam: Mrs Squillionaire
- Damsire: Last Tycoon
- Sex: Gelding
- Foaled: 31 October 2003 (age 21)
- Country: New Zealand
- Colour: Bay
- Owner: Roger Li Ka Chun
- Trainer: Tony Vasil
- Record: 33: 4-3-3 (As of 27 February 2012)
- Earnings: HK$19,455,620 (As of 27 February 2012)

Major wins
- Hong Kong Classic Cup (2008); KrisFlyer International Sprint (2010)

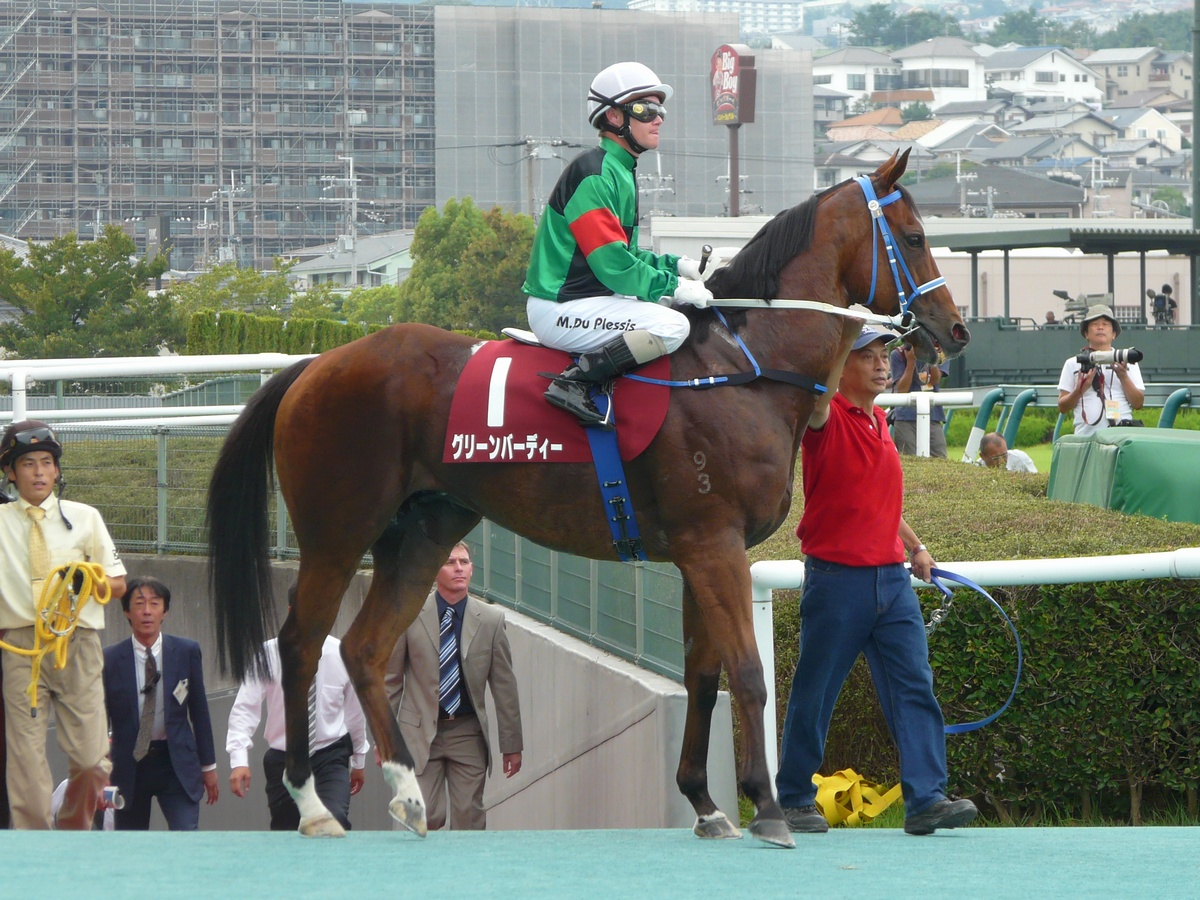
Green-Birdie20100912

Green Birdie (Chinese: 綠色駿威) (foaled 31 October 2003) is a Hong Kong-based retired Thoroughbred racehorse.

In the 2009–10 season, he won the G1 KrisFlyer International Sprint at Kranji on 16 May. He was also one of the nominees for the 2010 Hong Kong Horse of the Year.
