= KrisFlyer International Sprint =

Horse race competition

The KrisFlyer International Sprint is a former Thoroughbred horse race held at Kranji Racecourse in Singapore. Contested on turf over a left-handed course, the International Group 1 sprint race was run over a distance of 1,200 meters (6 furlongs) and was open to horses aged three and older. It offered a purse of S$1,000,000 (about US$800,000). The race was discontinued in 2015.

The KrisFlyer International Sprint was limited to fourteen starters with the following weight restrictions:

- Northern Hemisphere 3-year-olds: 53.0 kg.
- Southern Hemisphere 4-year-olds & upwards: 57.0 kg.
- Filly/Mare allowance: 1.5 kg.

The race was named after the frequent flyer program of the title sponsor Singapore Airlines and was run on the same day as the Singapore Airlines International Cup.

The race was held for the first time in 2001 as a Group 1 event. It was raced again the following year as a Group 3 event.

In winning the 2002 edition, North Boy set a new Kranji course record for six furlongs which was bettered by Takeover Target in 2008, and in 2009, Hong Kong's Sacred Kingdom broke the course record again with a time of 1:07.8.

The event was not run from 2003 to 2007.

In 2011, the KrisFlyer International Sprint became part of the Global Sprint Challenge Series. The race was the third leg of the series, preceded by the Takamatsunomiya Kinen and followed by the King's Stand Stakes.

The final KrisFlyer International Sprint was in 2015.

In 2024 horse racing ceased in Singapore.

== Winners ==
The winners of the KrisFlyer International Sprint were as follows.

Year	Winner (Country)	Age	Jockey	Trainer	Owner	Time
2001	Iron Mask (FRA)	3	Olivier Doleuze	Criquette Head	Wertheimer et Frère	1:09.8
2002	North Boy (AUS)	3	Greg Childs	Tony McEvoy	P. B. Devitt et al.	1:09.0
2008	Takeover Target (AUS)	8	Jay Ford	Joe Janiak	Joe & Ben Janiak	1:08.82
2009	Sacred Kingdom (HKG)	5	Brett Prebble	Ricky Yiu	Sin Kang Yuk	1:07.8
2010	Green Birdie (HKG)	6	Mark Du Plessis	Caspar Fownes	Roger Li Ka Chun	1:09.62
2011	Rocket Man (SIN)	5	Felix Coetzee	Patrick Shaw	Alfredo L. A. Crabbia	1:09.14
2012	Ato (SIN)	5	Barend Vorster	Patrick Shaw	Newbury Racing Stable	1:10.57
2013	Lucky Nine (HKG)	6	Brett Prebble	Caspar Fownes	Dr Chang Fuk To & Maria Chang Lee Ming Shum	1:08.71
2014	Lucky Nine (HKG)	7	Brett Prebble	Caspar Fownes	Dr Chang Fuk To & Maria Chang Lee Ming Shum	1:08.15
2015	Aerovelocity (HKG)	6	Zac Purton	Paul O'Sullivan	Daniel Yeung Ngai	1:09.05
