= Takeover Target =

Australian-bred Thoroughbred racehorse

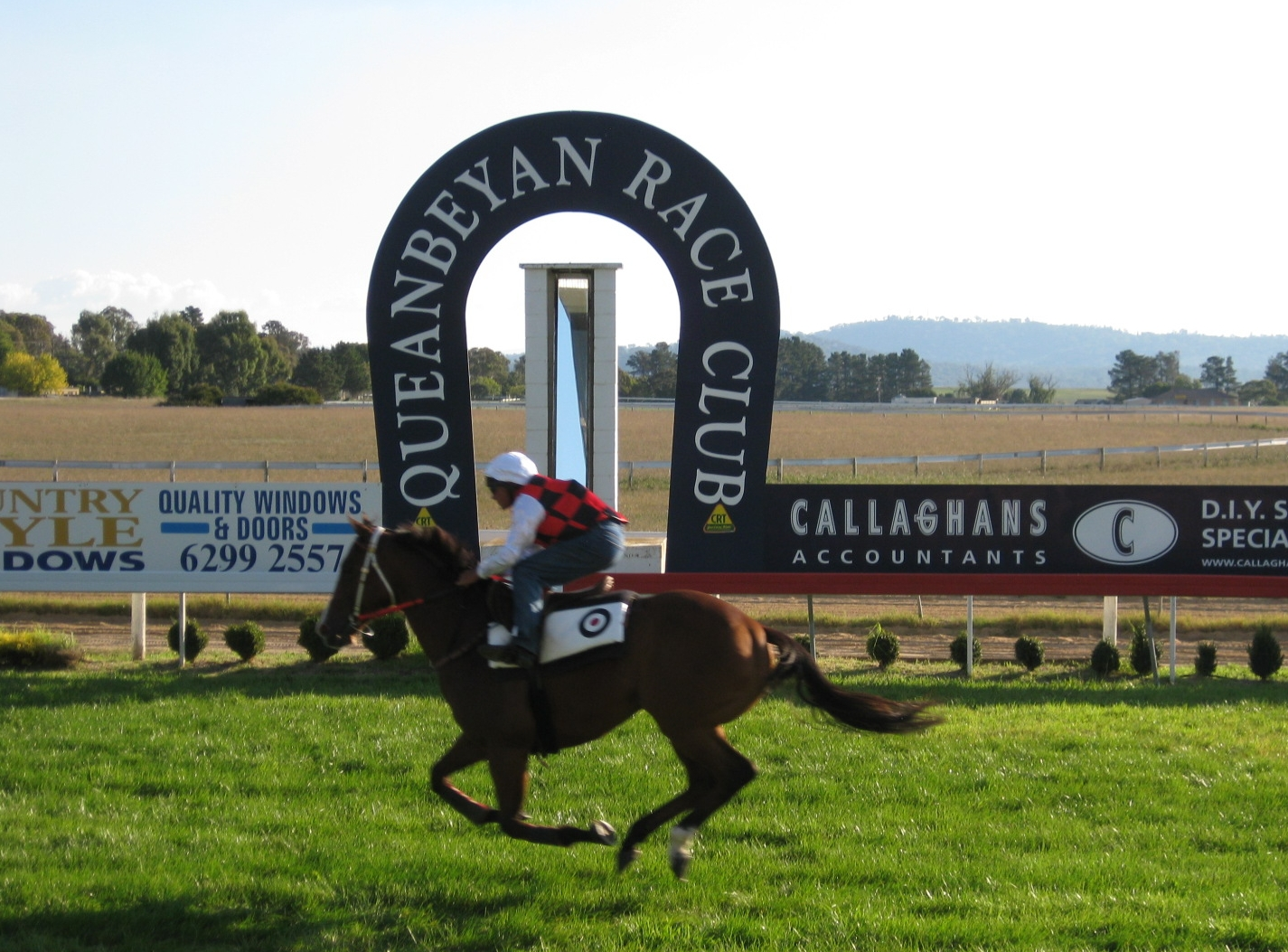
- Takeover Target in exhibition gallop at Queanbeyan Racecourse
- Sire: Celtic Swing (GB)
- Grandsire: Damister (USA)
- Dam: Shady Stream (AUS)
- Damsire: Archregent (CAN)
- Sex: Gelding
- Foaled: 27 September 1999
- Died: 20 June 2015 (aged 15)
- Country: Australia
- Colour: Bay
- Breeder: Meringo Stud, New South Wales
- Owner: Joe Janiak, Ben Janiak
- Trainer: Joe Janiak
- Record: 41:21-6-4
- Earnings: A$6,028,311

Major wins
- Salinger Stakes (G1) (2004); Lightning Stakes (G1) (2006); Newmarket Handicap (G1) (2006); King's Stand Stakes (G2) (2006); Sprinters Stakes (G1) (2006); Doomben 10,000 (G1) (2007); KrisFlyer International Sprint (G1) (2008); T J Smith Stakes (G1) (2009)); The Goodwood (G1) (2009)

Awards
- Australian Champion Sprinter (2006); World's Highest Rated Turf Sprinter (2006); IFHA rating: 121; Global Sprint Challenge Champion (2006); Australian Champion International Performer (2006, 2007, 2008)

Honours
- Australian Racing Hall of Fame inductee (2012)
- Last updated on 16 April 2012

Takeover Target (27 September 1999 – 20 June 2015) was a much-travelled Australian Thoroughbred racehorse who won top sprinting races in each of the five major cities in Australia as well as in the United Kingdom, Japan, and Singapore.

He was owned and trained by Joe Janiak, a former Queanbeyan, New South Wales, taxi driver, and was ridden by Sydney-based jockey Jay Ford in all but two race starts. He was purchased for A$1,250 plus $125 GST in July 2003 and earned $6,028,311 in prize money.

== Racing career ==
Sired by Celtic Swing out of the unraced dam Shady Stream, Takeover Target was ruled out of racing for thirty months due to leg and joint problems. He did not make his debut until he was a four-year-old. He was unbeaten in all of his starts in 2004 and set a seven-race winning run following his debut on 23 April 2004 in a 1,200 metre maiden race at Queanbeyan Racecourse. These wins included victory in the listed Pacesetter Stakes at Gosford Racecourse, the listed Ramornie Handicap at Grafton Racecourse, and the Group 1 Salinger Stakes at Flemington Racecourse in October of that year.

Takeover Target then endured two injuries which kept him out of racing for a further six months. He pulled up lame after winning a barrier trial at the Gold Coast Racecourse in late November 2004 while being prepared for two stakes races at Doomben Racecourse, then had a piece of infected bone removed from a hoof while being prepared for the Sydney Autumn Racing Carnival in 2005.

In 2005, he failed to win in six starts before a first-up win in December at Doomben Racecourse in the Group 3 Summer Stakes, winning by more than five lengths carrying 59.5 kg while breaking the 1,200 metre track record previously held by Lion Hunter with a time of 1:07.88. He followed this up with another win in the listed Doomben Stakes, winning by three lengths carrying 60.5 kg and running within four one-hundreds of a second of the 1,350-metre track record held by Falvelon.

In the early part of 2006, Takeover Target won two Group 1 races, the Lightning Stakes and the Newmarket Handicap at Flemington Racecourse, becoming only the third horse behind Black Onyx and Shaftesbury Avenue to carry at least 57 kg to victory in the Newmarket Handicap in the last thirty-six years. He also became only the second horse behind Maybe Mahal to win Flemington's three major Group 1 sprints: the Salinger Stakes, Lightning Stakes and Newmarket Handicap. These wins resulted in Takeover Target being invited to compete in the Royal Ascot carnival in June in the United Kingdom.

His British campaign started successfully when he won the Group 2 King's Stand Stakes on 20 June 2006, defeating Benbaun. He then finished third behind Les Arcs in the Group 1 Golden Jubilee Stakes four days later and seventh behind Les Arcs in the Group 1 July Cup at Newmarket Racecourse, beaten two lengths. After his King's Stand Stakes win, Takeover Target was declared the best sprinter in the world on turf by the International Federation of Horseracing Authorities with a rating of 118, which improved to 121 with a win in Japan later in the year.

At the end of the 2005–06 season, Takeover Target was named Australian Champion Sprinter.

From England, he travelled to Japan, where he finished second in the Group 2 Centaur Stakes at Chukyo Racecourse to locally trained mare She Is Tosho. In the Group 1 Sprinters Stakes at Nakayama Racecourse, Takeover Target won by about three lengths, defeating a field which contained Meisho Bowler, Silent Witness, She Is Tosho, Les Arcs, and Benbaun. In Hong Kong, where he was to compete in the Group 1 Hong Kong International Sprint, he was withdrawn by stewards on the morning of the race for returning a positive reading to 17-alpha-hydroxyprogesterone hexanoate, a hormone. The horse was a short-priced favourite and, if he had won the race, his connections stood to collect a further US$1 million bonus in prize money for winning Group 1 races in the Global Sprint Challenge series in three of the four host countries. Instead the horse's owner and trainer, Joe Janiak, was fined 200,000 Hong Kong Dollars by stewards.

On International Day in Hong Kong, Takeover Target was crowned Global Sprint Challenge Champion for 2006, finishing with 53 points, well clear of his closest competitor on 17 points.

His return to racing in Australia in 2007 was delayed, first by an injury sustained in an exhibition gallop at a Queanbeyan race meeting in early March, then by a virus which forced him to miss the Group 1 T J Smith Stakes at Randwick Racecourse in early April. He resumed the following week in the Group 1 All Aged Stakes at Randwick over 1,400 metres, where he ran fifth. Takeover Target then finished second in the Group 1 BTC Cup at Doomben Racecourse followed by a win in the Group 1 Doomben 10,000, defeating the filly Gold Edition. He then headed back to England for the 2007 Royal Ascot carnival.

On 19 June, he finished fourth in the Group 2 King's Stand Stakes behind Miss Andretti before finishing second in the Group 1 Golden Jubilee Stakes to American-bred entrant Soldier's Tale. He then returned to Australia and his new home at Coffs Harbour in New South Wales.

Due to the 2007 Australian equine influenza outbreak that spread throughout New South Wales and Queensland in late August, Takeover Target was not able to travel to Victoria to compete in the Melbourne Spring Racing Carnival. He resumed racing on 1 December 2007 in a $100,000 Open Handicap race at Randwick. He carried 61 kg to defeat Dance Hero, a former Golden Slipper and multiple Group 1 winner. Three weeks later, Takeover Target raced again at Randwick in a listed race over 1,200 metres in what was dubbed a match race with Dance Hero. Takeover Target held off the late challenge of Scone mare Alverta to win the race. Dance Hero finished last. In the Group 2 Villiers Stakes over 1,400 metres, Takeover Target held off the challenge of the former North American-trained Group 1 winner Honor In War to win by a nose with Alverta 2½ lengths back in third place, but he lost the race on protest to Honor In War due to interference 200 metres from the finish.

Following a spell, Takeover Target returned to racing on 26 April 2008 in the Group 1 T J Smith Stakes over 1,200 metres at Randwick, finishing third behind multiple Group 1 winner Apache Cat. He then travelled to Singapore, where he won the Singapore Turf Club’s KrisFlyer International Sprint (G1) over 1,200 metres at Kranji Racecourse on 18 May 2008 in new track record time of 1:08.80.

From Singapore, Takeover Target travelled to England. On 17 June, he finished second in the Group 1 King's Stand Stakes behind Equiano. Four days later, he finished fourth in the Group 1 Golden Jubilee Stakes behind Kingsgate Native despite suffering suspensory ligament damage during the race.

At the end of the 2007–08 season, Takeover Target was named Australian Champion International Performer for the third consecutive season.

His return to racing in Australia was delayed as a consequence of a stone bruise sustained while being prepared for the Group 1 Patinack Farm Classic at Flemington Racecourse in early November 2008. He resumed three weeks later in the Group 2 Winterbottom Stakes over 1,200 metres at Ascot Racecourse in Perth, Western Australia in what was promoted as an eagerly anticipated rematch with the reigning Australian Champion Sprinter Apache Cat. He led all the way and held off a late challenge from Apache Cat to win by a nose. Two weeks later, Takeover Target contested the Group 3 A J Scahill Stakes over 1,400 metres at Ascot Racecourse, defeating last season's race winner, Tarzi, by almost three lengths.

His next campaign began at Royal Randwick on 18 April 2009 in the Group 1 T J Smith Stakes over 1,200 metres against five other Group One winners, including last year's victor, Apache Cat. Nash Rawiller was declared the rider as Joe Janiak stated he didn't want the horse carrying too much 'dead weight' as regular rider Jay Ford was due to ride on the same card with a lightweight so would have to carry extra weight on Takeover Target. He went out third favourite behind Apache Cat and after jumping well crossed to the lead. He kicked away in the straight and won by two and three quarter lengths from 3yo Northern Meteor with three lengths to Apache Cat in third in race record time. He was given a warm reception by the crowd returning to scale. Two weeks later, Takeover Target contested The Goodwood (G1) over 1,200 metres at Morphettville Racecourse in Adelaide, South Australia, where he defeated I Am Invincible by one length. He then travelled to Singapore, where he ran eighth in the Group 1 KrisFlyer International Sprint over 1,200 metres at Kranji Racecourse on 17 May 2009.

From Singapore, Takeover Target travelled to England, where he was to contest the Group 1 Golden Jubilee Stakes on 20 June at Royal Ascot, only to be withdrawn on race eve due to an elevated temperature. Three weeks later, he contested the Group 1 July Cup at Newmarket Racecourse, finishing in seventh behind Fleeting Spirit. He sustained a career-ending injury when he cracked the cannon bone in his near hind leg. After he underwent surgery at the Newmarket Equine Veterinary Hospital to insert five screws in the cannon bone, Janiak officially announced his retirement.

In a career that spanned six seasons, Takeover Target won twenty-one of his forty-one starts, including eight races at Group One level, and accumulated $6,028,311 in prize money, which placed him in sixth position amongst the Millionaire racehorses trained in Australia and the only specialist sprinter in the top twenty at the time of his retirement.

A book titled TAKEOVER TARGET - THE BEST $1375 JOE JANIAK EVER SPENT was released after his retirement in 2009.

In September 2010, Janiak announced that Takeover Target might race again as he had fully recovered from the leg injury that forced his retirement and was as keen as ever to continue racing. In October 2010, Janiak said that the horse would not make a comeback.

Takeover Target was inducted into the Australian Racing Hall of Fame in 2012. The horse, known as Archie, was retired to "Toofrook" in Lawrence, Northern Rivers, NSW. He was euthanised after suffering a serious leg injury in his paddock on 20 June 2015.

== Race record ==
2003–04 season as a four year old
Result	Date	Race	Venue	Distance	Weight (kg)	Time	Jockey	Winner	2nd
Won	23/4/2004	Open Maiden	Queanbeyan	1200m	57.0	1:09.93	J. Ford	Takeover Target	Ras Tafari
Won	6/5/2004	Class 1 Handicap	Wagga	1200m	57.5	1:09.41	J. Ford	Takeover Target	Devour
Won	19/5/2004	4yo Restricted Handicap	Randwick	1400m	52.0	1:23.92	J. Ford	Takeover Target	Bibury Court
Won	5/6/2004	4yo Open Handicap	Rosehill	1200m	51.0	1:09.51	J. Ford	Takeover Target	Spinjester
Won	24/6/2004	Pacesetter Stakes (L)	Gosford	1200m	53.0	1:09.70	J. Ford	Takeover Target	Mustard
Won	14/7/2004	Ramornie Handicap (L)	Grafton	1200m	54.5	1:08.41	J. Ford	Takeover Target	Devil

2004–05 season as a five year old
Result	Date	Race	Venue	Distance	Weight (kg)	Time	Jockey	Winner	2nd
Won	30/10/2004	Salinger Stakes (G1)	Flemington	1200m	53.0	1:08.27	J. Ford	Takeover Target	Recurring
4th	30/4/2005	BTC Cup (G2)	Doomben	1200m	57.5	1:09.00	J. Ford	Spark Of Life	St Basil
3rd	21/5/2005	Doomben 10,000 (G1)	Doomben	1350m	58.0	1:18.63	J. Ford	Red Oog	Our Egyptian Raine
10th	11/6/2005	Stradbroke Handicap (G1)	Eagle Farm	1400m	54.0	1:20.70	J. Ford	St Basil	Perfect Promise
2nd	25/6/2005	Carlton Draught Stakes (G3)	Eagle Farm	1200m	57.5	1:09.40	J. Ford	Poetic Papal	Takeover Target

2005–06 season as a six year old
Result	Date	Race	Venue	Distance	Weight (kg)	Time	Jockey	Winner	2nd
4th	29/10/2005	Salinger Stakes (G1)	Flemington	1200m	54.0	1:08.93	J. Ford	Glamour Puss	Stratum
7th	5/11/2005	The Age Classic (G2)	Flemington	1200m	57.5	1:08.92	S. Arnold	Glamour Puss	Barely A Moment
Won	10/12/2005	Summer Stakes (G3)	Doomben	1200m	59.5	1:07.88	J. Ford	Takeover Target	Picardi Run
Won	24/12/2005	Doomben Stakes (L)	Doomben	1350m	60.5	1:17.25	J. Ford	Takeover Target	Impaler
Won	4/2/2006	Lightning Stakes (G1)	Flemington	1000m	57.5	0:56.80	J. Ford	Takeover Target	God's Own
3rd	25/2/2006	Oakleigh Plate (G1)	Caulfield	1100m	57.0	1:04.46	J. Ford	Snitzel	Virage De Fortune
Won	11/3/2006	Newmarket Handicap (G1)	Flemington	1200m	57.0	1:08.03	J. Ford	Takeover Target	Snitzel
Won	20/6/2006	King's Stand Stakes (G2)	Royal Ascot	1005m	61.0	0:59.79	J. Ford	Takeover Target	Benbaun
3rd	24/6/2006	Golden Jubilee Stakes (G1)	Royal Ascot	1206m	59.5	1:13.12	J. Ford	Les Arcs	Balthazaar's Gift
7th	14/7/2006	July Cup (G1)	Newmarket	1206m	60.0	1:11.16	J. Ford	Les Arcs	Iffraaj

2006–07 season as a seven year old
Result	Date	Race	Venue	Distance	Weight (kg)	Time	Jockey	Winner	2nd
2nd	10/9/2006	Centaur Stakes (G2)	Chukyo	1200m	59.0	1:08.60	J. Ford	She Is Tosho	Takeover Target
Won	1/10/2006	Sprinters Stakes (G1)	Nakayama	1200m	58.0	1:08.10	J. Ford	Takeover Target	Meisho Bowler
5th	14/04/2007	All Aged Stakes (G1)	Randwick	1400m	59.0	1:24.07	J. Ford	Bentley Biscuit	Black Ink
2nd	12/5/2007	BTC Cup (G1)	Doomben	1200m	58.5	1;08.57	J. Ford	Bentley Biscuit	Takeover Target
Won	26/5/2007	Doomben 10,000 (G1)	Doomben	1350m	59.0	1:18.55	J. Ford	Takeover Target	Gold Edition
4th	19/6/2007	King's Stand Stakes (G2)	Royal Ascot	1005m	59.5	0:57.44	J. Ford	Miss Andretti	Dandy Man
2nd	23/6/2007	Golden Jubilee Stakes (G1)	Royal Ascot	1206m	59.5	1:14.51	J. Ford	Soldier's Tale	Takeover Target

2007–08 season as an eight year old
Result	Date	Race	Venue	Distance	Weight (kg)	Time	Jockey	Winner	2nd
Won	1/12/2007	Arrowfield Stud Quality	Randwick	1200m	61.0	1:08.95	J. Ford	Takeover Target	Dance Hero
Won	22/12/2007	Razor Sharp Quality (L)	Randwick	1200m	61.0	1:09.56	J. Ford	Takeover Target	Alverta
2nd	5/1/2008	Villiers Stakes Quality (G2)	Randwick	1400m	61.0	1:21.54	J. Ford	Honor In War	Takeover Target
3rd	26/4/2008	T J Smith Stakes (G1)	Randwick	1200m	58.5	1:11.80	J. Ford	Apache Cat	Reigning To Win
Won	18/5/2008	KrisFlyer International Sprint (G1)	Kranji	1200m	57.0	1:08.80	J. Ford	Takeover Target	Magnus
2nd	17/6/2008	King's Stand Stakes (G1)	Royal Ascot	1005m	59.5	0:59.35	J. Ford	Equiano	Takeover Target
4th	21/6/2008	Golden Jubilee Stakes (G1)	Royal Ascot	1206m	59.5	1:13.33	J. Ford	Kingsgate Native	War Artist

2008–09 season as a nine year old
Result	Date	Race	Venue	Distance	Weight (kg)	Time	Jockey	Winner	2nd
Won	29/11/2008	Winterbottom Stakes (G2)	Ascot	1200m	58.5	1:09.15	J. Ford	Takeover Target	Apache Cat
Won	13/12/2008	A J Scahill Stakes (G3)	Ascot	1400m	59.0	1:22.80	J. Ford	Takeover Target	Tarzi
Won	18/4/2009	T J Smith Stakes (G1)	Randwick	1200m	58.5	1:09.09	Nash Rawiller	Takeover Target	Northern Meteor
Won	2/5/2009	The Goodwood (G1)	Morphettville	1200m	58.5	1:10.78	J. Ford	Takeover Target	I Am Invincible
8th	17/5/2009	KrisFlyer International Sprint (G1)	Kranji	1200m	57.0	1:07.80	J. Ford	Sacred Kingdom	Rocket Man
7th	10/7/2009	July Cup (G1)	Newmarket	1206m	59.5	1:09.58	J. Ford	Fleeting Spirit	Main Aim

== Pedigree ==
Pedigree of Takeover Target (AUS) (11) (B. g. 1999)
Sire Celtic Swing (GB) br. 1992	Damister (USA) b. 1982	Mr. Prospector (USA)	Raise A Native (USA)
Sire Celtic Swing (GB) br. 1992	Damister (USA) b. 1982	Mr. Prospector (USA)	Gold Digger (USA)
Sire Celtic Swing (GB) br. 1992	Damister (USA) b. 1982	Batucada (USA)	Roman Line (USA)
Sire Celtic Swing (GB) br. 1992	Damister (USA) b. 1982	Batucada (USA)	Whistle A Tune (USA)
Sire Celtic Swing (GB) br. 1992	Celtic Ring (GB) b. 1984	Welsh Pageant (FR)	Tudor Melody (GB)
Sire Celtic Swing (GB) br. 1992	Celtic Ring (GB) b. 1984	Welsh Pageant (FR)	Picture Light (FR)
Sire Celtic Swing (GB) br. 1992	Celtic Ring (GB) b. 1984	Pencuik Jewel (GB)	Petingo (GB)
Sire Celtic Swing (GB) br. 1992	Celtic Ring (GB) b. 1984	Pencuik Jewel (GB)	Fotheringay (FRA)
Dam Shady Stream (AUS) ch. 1994	Archregent (CAN) b. 1981	Vice Regent (CAN)	Northern Dancer (CAN)
Dam Shady Stream (AUS) ch. 1994	Archregent (CAN) b. 1981	Vice Regent (CAN)	Victoria Regina (CAN)
Dam Shady Stream (AUS) ch. 1994	Archregent (CAN) b. 1981	Respond (CAN)	Canadian Champ (CAN)
Dam Shady Stream (AUS) ch. 1994	Archregent (CAN) b. 1981	Respond (CAN)	Reply (USA)
Dam Shady Stream (AUS) ch. 1994	Merry Shade (AUS) gr. 1989	Spectacular Spy (USA)	Spectacular Bid (USA)
Dam Shady Stream (AUS) ch. 1994	Merry Shade (AUS) gr. 1989	Spectacular Spy (USA)	Lassie Dear (USA)
Dam Shady Stream (AUS) ch. 1994	Merry Shade (AUS) gr. 1989	Parasol (AUS)	Sostenuto (ITY)
Dam Shady Stream (AUS) ch. 1994	Merry Shade (AUS) gr. 1989	Parasol (AUS)	Mary Poppins (AUS)
