= Doomben 10,000 =

Australian horse race

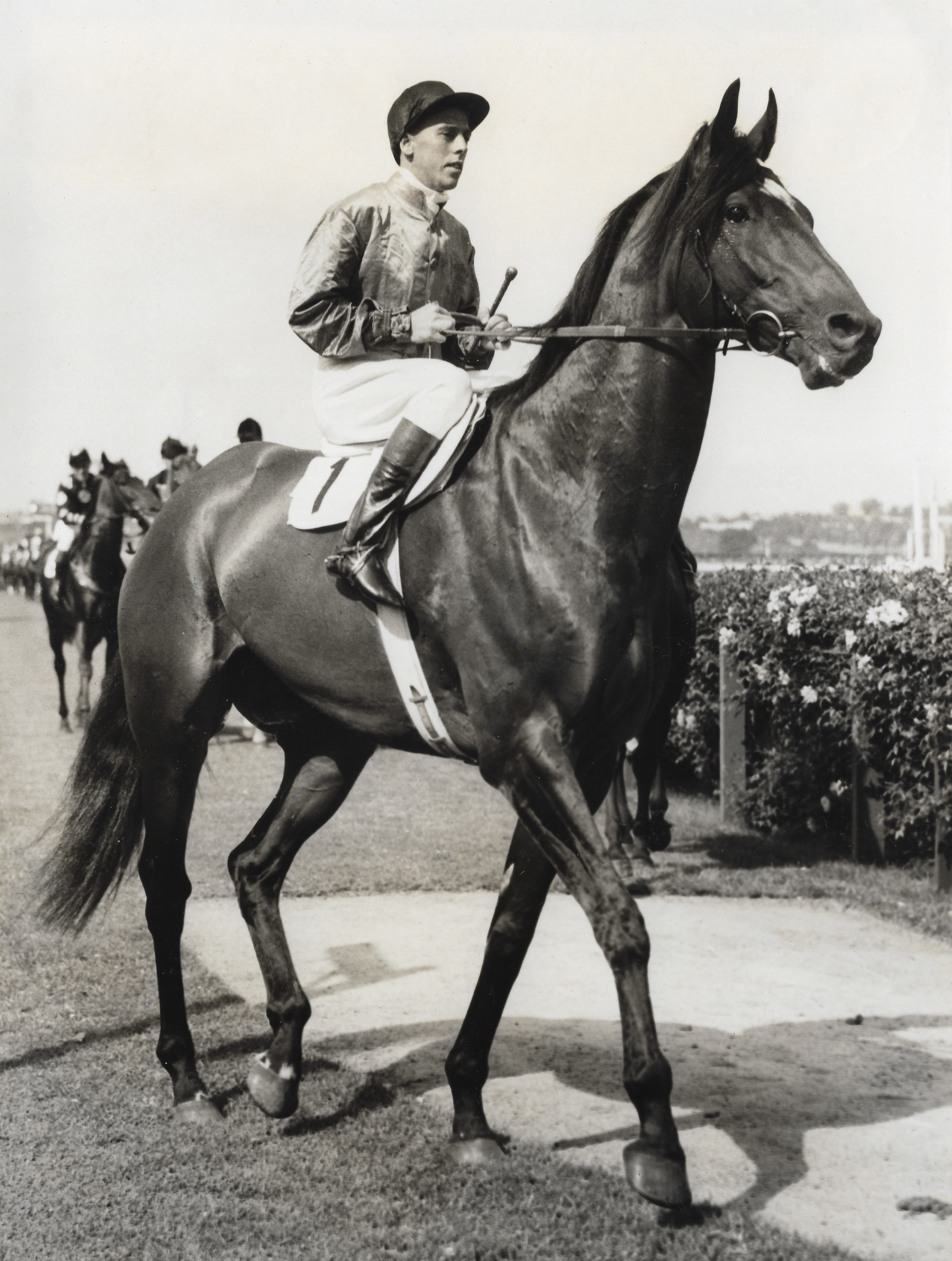
- Bernborough, 1946 winner
- Class: Group 1
- Location: Doomben Racecourse; Brisbane, Australia
- Inaugurated: 1933 (as Doomben Newmarket Handicap)
- Race type: Thoroughbred - Flat racing
- Sponsor: Ladbrokes (2026)

Race information
- Distance: 1,200 metres
- Surface: Turf
- Track: Right-handed
- Qualification: Horses three years old and older
- Weight: Weight for Age
- Purse: A$1,500,000 (2026)

The Doomben 10,000 is a Brisbane Racing Club Group 1 Thoroughbred Weight for Age horse race, run over a distance of 1200 metres at Doomben Racecourse, Brisbane, Australia during the Queensland Winter Racing Carnival. The race is considered one of the premier sprint races in Queensland racing.

== History ==
The race was changed to the Doomben 10,000 after the £10,000 prize money on offer, which at the time was the richest sprint in Australia.
Notable sprinters to win the race are Chief De Beers (1995, 1998), Falvelon (2001-02), Prince Trialia in 1990–91, and Black Onyx in 1969–70. Included in the list are former greats Bernborough in 1946 and Manikato in 1979.

In July 1951, then apprentice Aboriginal jockey Merv Maynard (whose career spanned nearly five decades, in which he rode over 1,500 winners) was heading for a win on Waratah King when the horse came down, and he was thrown. Coniston went on to win the race.

Recently, champion sprinters Apache Cat and Takeover Target captured this race. Sea Siren was the first three-year-old filly to win the race in 2012.

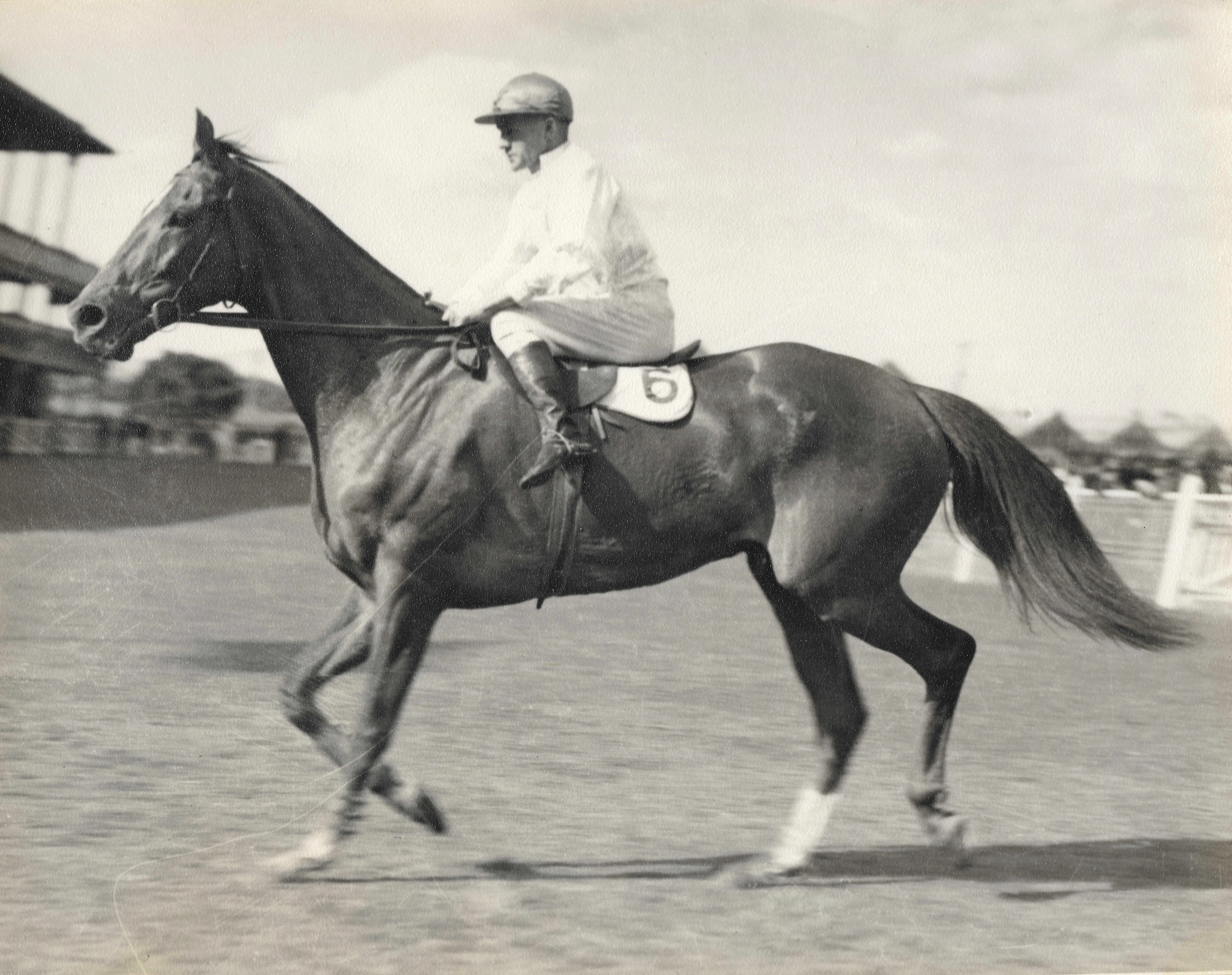
Lough Neagh, 1934 winner

=== 1954 racebook ===
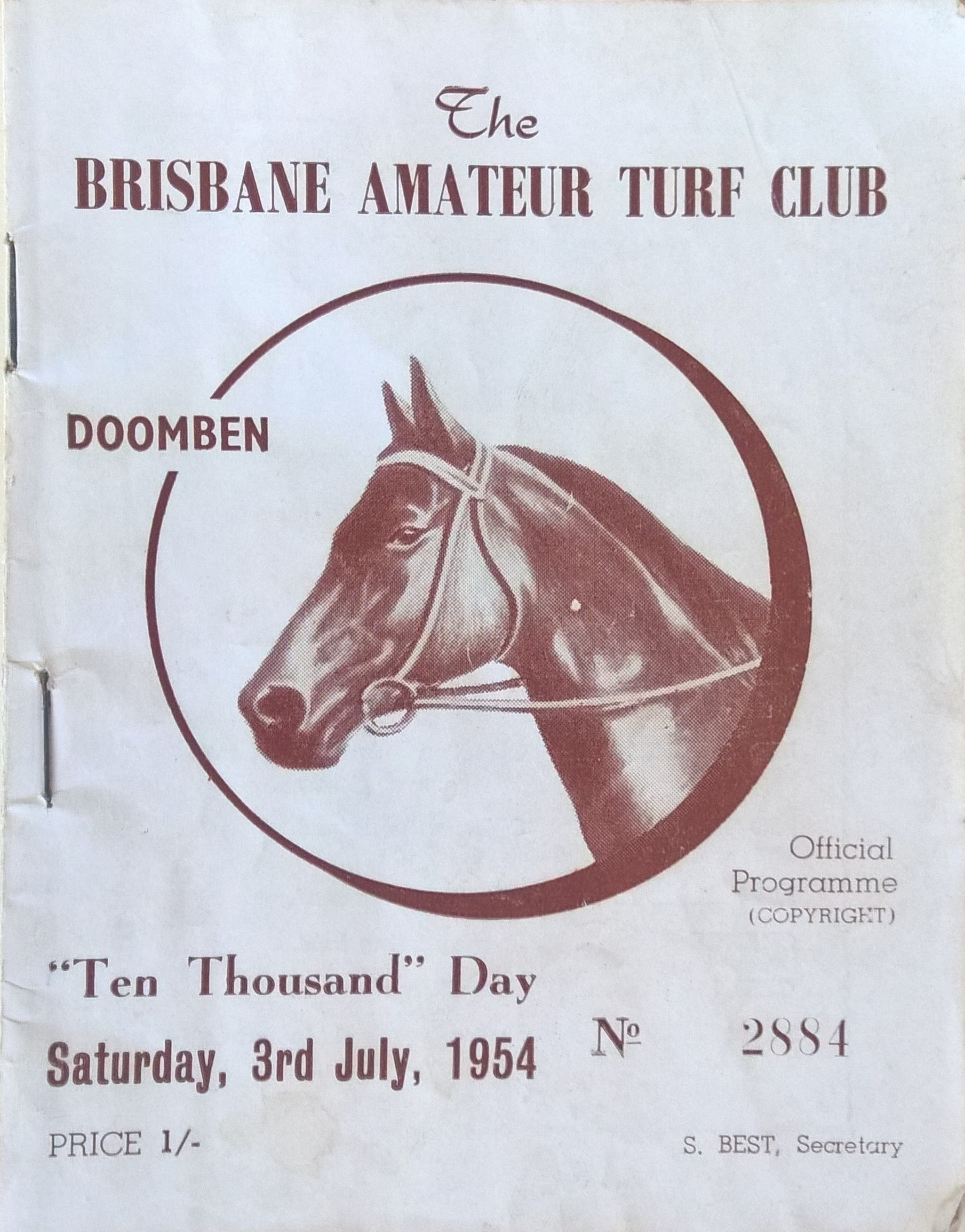
1954 BATC Doomben 10,000 racebook front cover

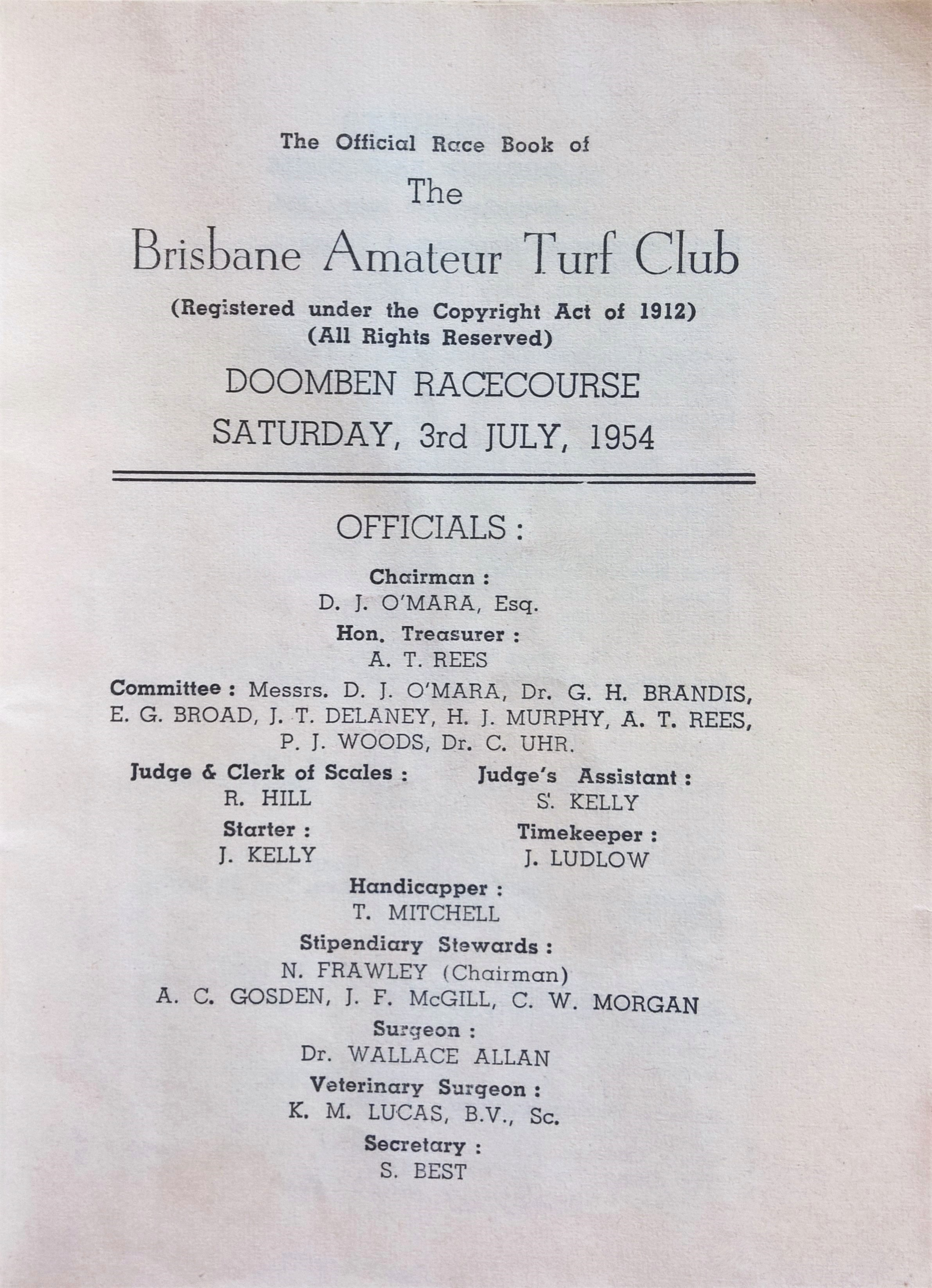
1954 BATC Doomben 10,000 showing raceday officials

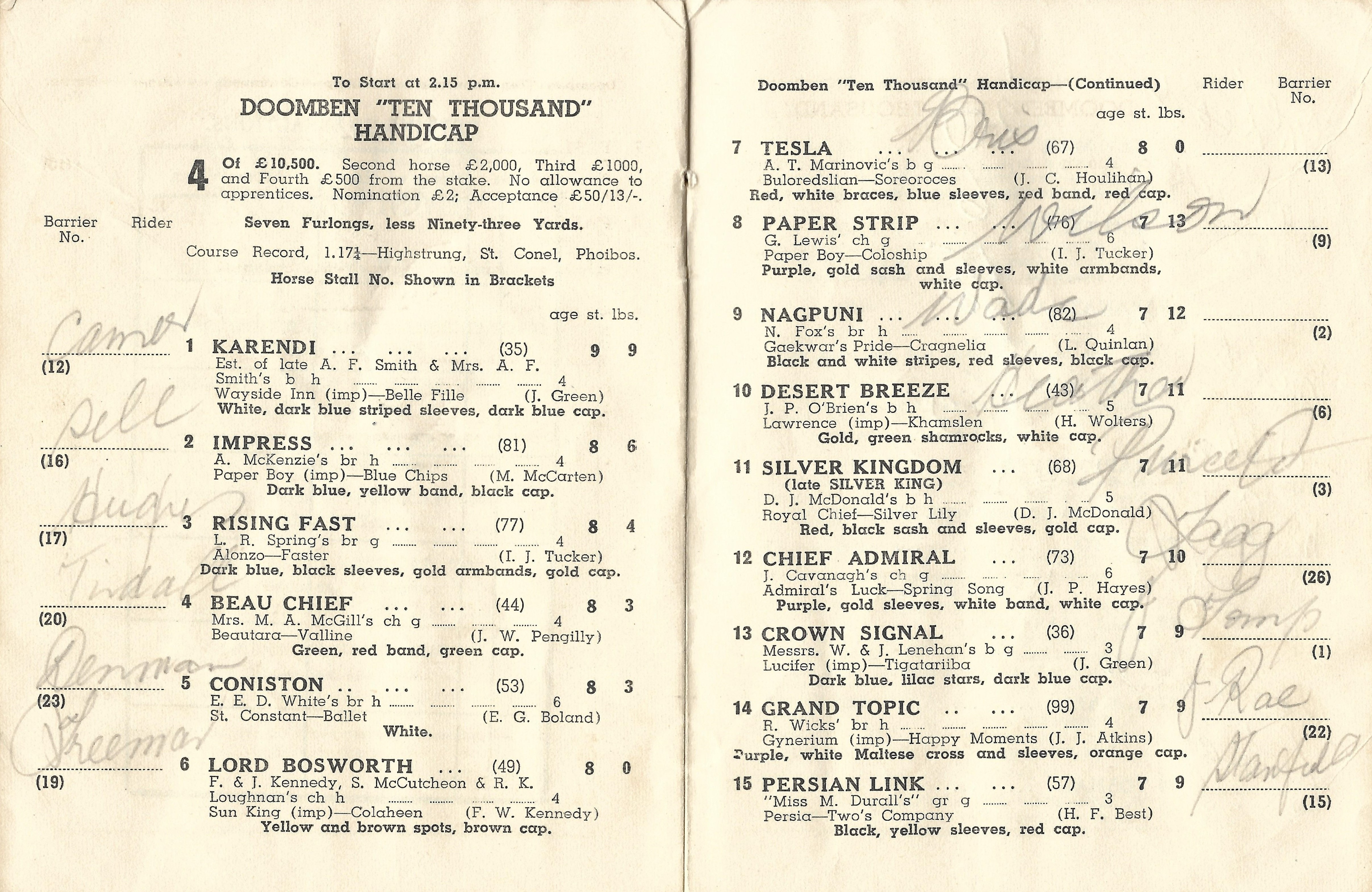
1954 BATC Doomben 10,000 showing the winner, Nagpuni

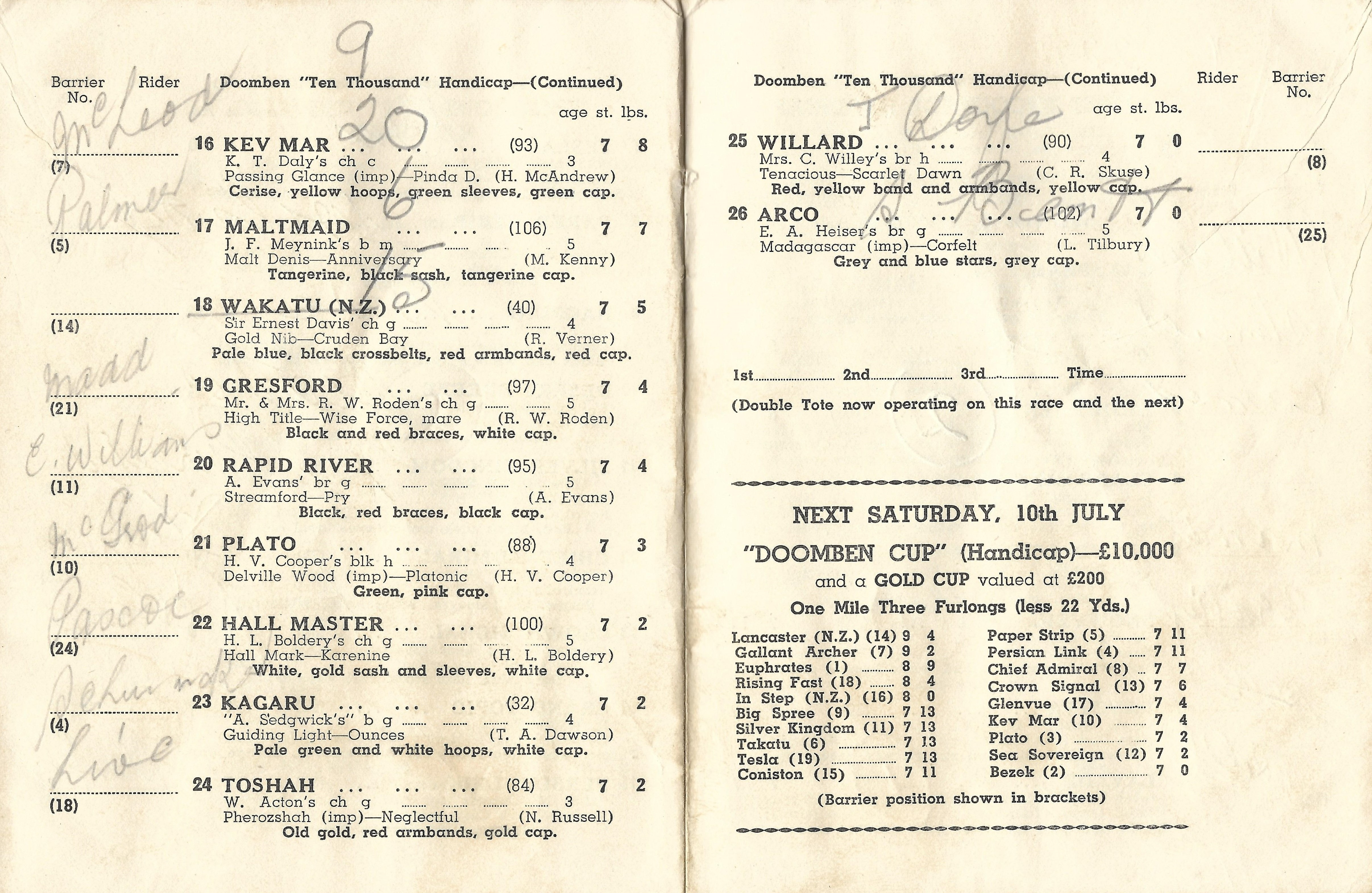
1954 BATC Doomben 10,000 starters and results

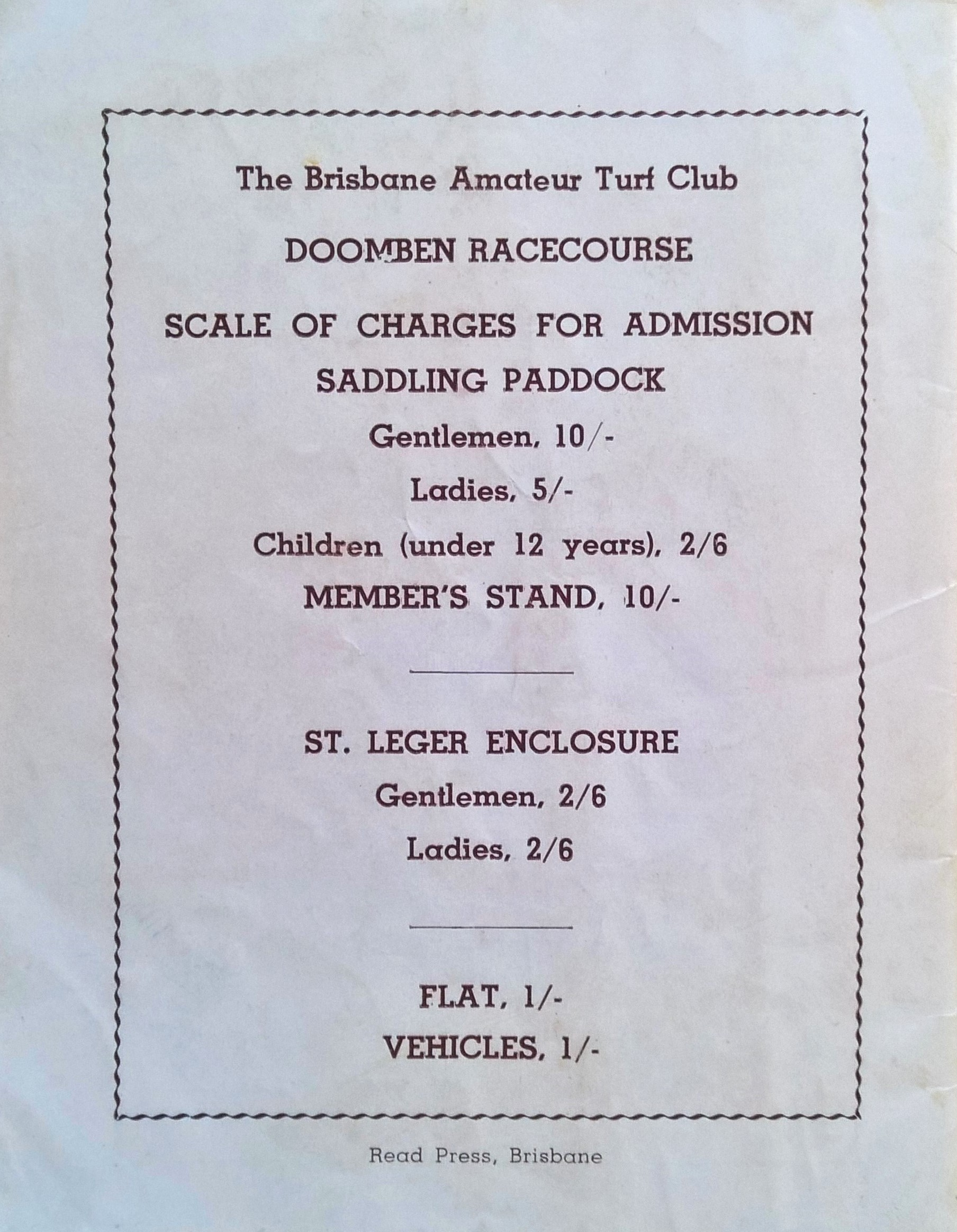
Back cover showing admission charges

=== Name ===
- 1933–1945 - Doomben Newmarket Handicap
- 1946–1979 - Doomben 10,000
- 1980–1989 - Rothmans 100,000
- 1990–1992 - Castlemaine 10,000
- 1993 onwards - Doomben 10,000

=== Distance ===
- 1933-1941 - 6 furlongs (~1200 metres) run at Doomben straight 6 furlongs.
- 1942-1945 - run over 7 furlongs at Albion Park
- 1942–1972 - 7 furlongs (~1400 metres)
- 1973–2016 – 1350 metres
- 2017 onwards - 1,200 metres

=== Grade ===
- 1933–1979 - Principal Race
- 1980 onwards - Group 1

=== Records ===
Jockey George Moore won the race five times:

- (1940, 1953, 1957, 1969, 1971)

Trainer T J Smith won the race six times:

- (1955, 1964, 1969, 1970, 1982, 1985)

The race record for the 1350 metre distance was set by Falvelon in 2001 with a time of 1:17.21 and Tipperary Star in 1963 in 1:17 1/5.

== Winners ==
The following are past winners of the race.

- 2026 - Rothfire
- 2025 - Sunshine In Paris
- 2024 - Bella Nipotina
- 2023 - Giga Kick
- 2022 - Mazu
- 2021 - Eduardo
- 2020 - ‡race not held
- 2019 - The Bostonian
- 2018 - English
- 2017 - Redzel
- 2016 - Music Magnate
- 2015 - Boban
- 2014 - Spirit of Boom
- 2013 - Epaulette
- 2012 - Sea Siren
- 2011 - Beaded
- 2010 - Hot Danish
- 2009 - Apache Cat
- 2008 - Apache Cat
- 2007 - Takeover Target
- 2006 - Undue
- 2005 - Red Oog
- 2004 - Super Elegant
- 2003 - Bel Esprit
- 2002 - Falvelon
- 2001 - Falvelon
- 2000 - Mr. Innocent
- 1999 - Laurie's Lottery
- 1998 - Chief De Beers
- 1997 - Accomplice
- 1996 - Suntain
- 1995 - Chief De Beers
- 1994 - Flitter
- 1993 - Unequalled
- 1992 - Barrosa Boy
- 1991 - Prince Trialia
- 1990 - Prince Trialia
- 1989 - Potrero
- 1988 - Campaign King
- 1987 - Broad Reach
- 1986 - Between Ourselves
- 1985 - Lord Ballina
- 1984 - Getting Closer
- 1983 - My Axeman
- 1982 - Ideal Planet
- 1981 - Sovereign Red
- 1980 - Hit It Benny
- 1979 - Manikato
- 1978 - Blue's Finito
- 1977 - Maybe Mahal
- 1976 - Burwana
- 1975 - Spedito
- 1974 - Charlton Boy
- 1973 - Craigola
- 1972 - Bengalla Lad
- 1971 - Baguette
- 1970 - Black Onyx
- 1969 - Black Onyx
- 1968 - Gay Gauntlet
- 1967 - Bourbon Beau
- 1966 - Pterylaw
- 1965 - Winfreux
- 1964 - The Tempest
- 1963 - Tipperary Star
- 1962 - Red Smoke
- 1961 - Aquanita
- 1960 - In Love
- 1959 - Second Earl
- 1958 - Grey Ghost
- 1957 - Teranyan
- 1956 - El Khobar
- 1955 - Apple Bay
- 1954 - Nagpuni
- 1953 - True Leader
- 1952 - Highlea
- 1951 - Coniston
- 1950 - Rim Boy
- 1949 - Ungar
- 1948 - Murray Stream
- 1947 - Highstrung
- 1946 - Bernborough
- 1945 - Port Raider
- 1944 - Gold Force
- 1943 - The Image
- 1942 - Auction
- 1941 - High Rank
- 1940 - Expressman
- 1939 - Micawber
- 1938 - Hamurah
- 1937 - Gay Chou
- 1936 - High Benia
- 1935 - Pamelus
- 1934 - Lough Neagh
- 1933 - Wallen

‡ Not held because of the COVID-19 pandemic in Australia

== See also ==
- Chairman's Handicap (BRC)
- Rough Habit Plate
- Spirit Of Boom Classic
- Stradbroke Handicap
- List of Australian Group races
- Group races
