= Apache Cat =

Australian-bred Thoroughbred racehorse

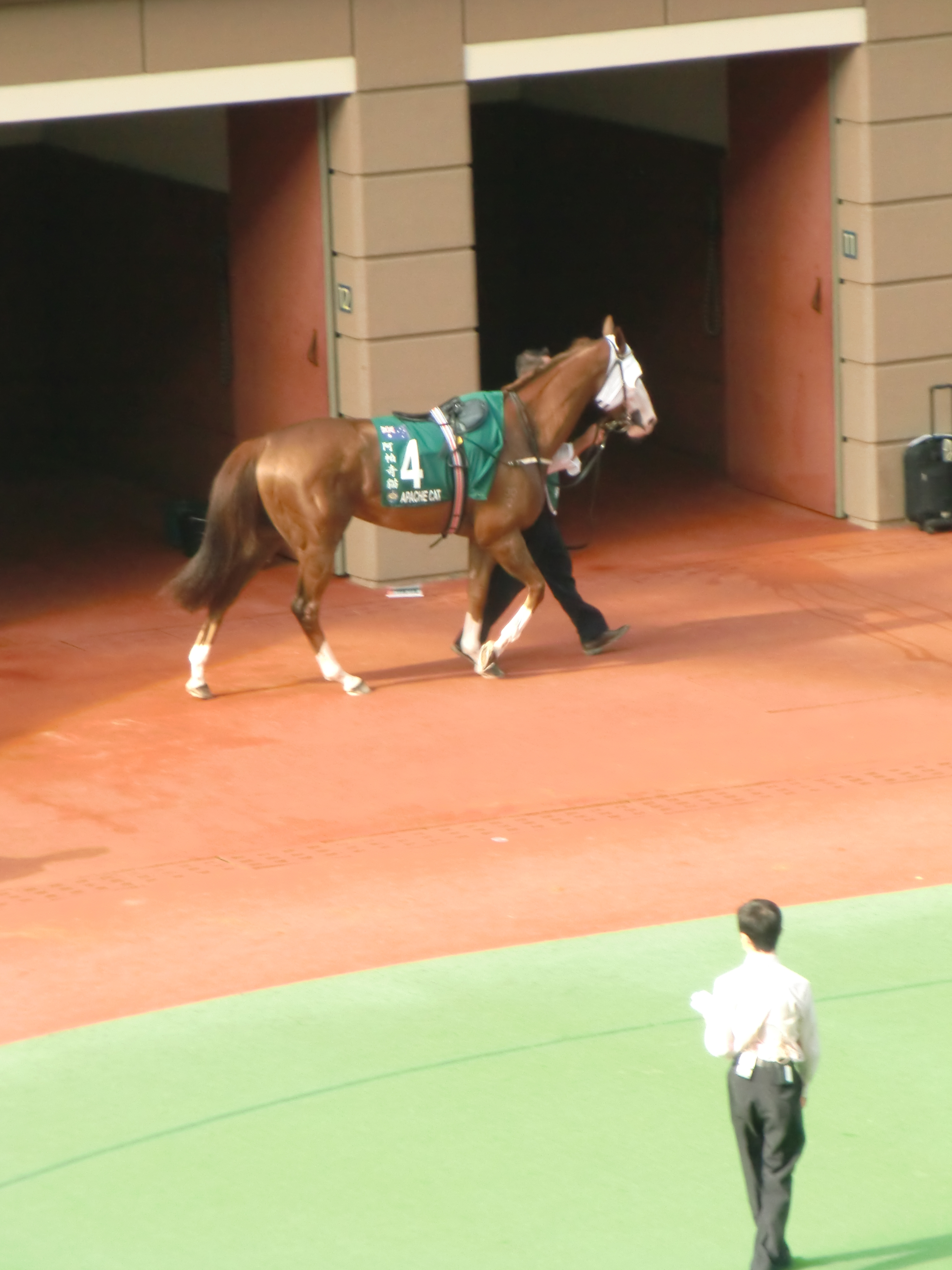
- Sire: Lion Cavern (USA)
- Grandsire: Mr. Prospector
- Dam: Tennessee Blaze
- Damsire: Whiskey Road (USA)
- Sex: Gelding
- Foaled: 2002
- Country: Australia
- Colour: Chestnut
- Breeder: Mr P.F. Radford and Ms R. Lawrie
- Owner: P.F. Radford, Ms R.N. Lawrie, G.E. Riddell, Mrs S.T. Riddell, Mrs M.B. Lofthouse, K.J. Lofthouse
- Trainer: Greg Eurell
- Record: 43:19-4-7
- Earnings: A$4.53 million

Major wins
- Cadbury Guineas (G1) (2006); Lightning Stakes (G1) (2008); Australia Stakes (G1) (2008, 2009); T J Smith Stakes (G1) (2008); BTC Cup (G1) (2008); Doomben 10,000 (G1) (2008, 2009)

Awards
- Australian Champion Sprinter (2008)
- Last updated on 4 September 2010

Apache Cat (foaled 2002) is an Australian Thoroughbred racehorse who had 43 starts for 19 wins (including eight Group One (G1) victories) and was placed on another 11 occasions from for just under $4.6 million in prize money. He was born and bred at Chatswood Stud in Victoria.

He is a strikingly marked, baldy faced, chestnut gelding by the shuttle stallion, Lion Cavern (USA) from Tennessee Blaze by Whiskey Road (USA). Apache Cat was bred by Mr P.F. Radford and Ms R Lawrie of Victoria.

== Racing record ==
In May 2008, Apache Cat scored his fourth and fifth consecutive Group One wins in the BTC Cup and in the Doomben 10,000 respectively at Doomben Racecourse in Brisbane, Queensland.

Apache Cat’s other Group One victories in this winning streak were Lightning Stakes at Flemington in 2008, Australia Stakes at Moonee Valley in 2008 and T J Smith Stakes at Randwick in 2008. He also won the 2006 Cadbury Guineas. Apache Cat's Group 1 streak matched the record set by T.J. Smith's champion Tulloch, Who was the last horse to win five majors in succession by claiming the Rosehill Guineas, AJC Derby, Caulfield Guineas, Caulfield Cup and Victoria Derby in 1957. Apache Cat was ridden by jockey Corey Brown in all five Group One victories of 2008, who rated the star sprinter the best he has ridden in his career.

After four defeats (two unplaced) to start his 2008/09 season, Apache Cat bounced back to form in February 2009 to win his seventh Group One in the Australia Stakes. At his next race start Apache Cat finished third behind Takeover Target in the Group One T J Smith Stakes at Randwick racecourse.

On 9 May 2009, Apache Cat lost no admirers when he just failed to record a second successive win in the weight-for-age BTC Cup event. Two weeks later, the sprinter etched his name into turf history after scoring back-to-back Doomben 10,000 wins at Doomben Racecourse. Apart from his eight G1 victories, he won four Group Two races, four Group Threes and two Listed races.

== Retirement ==
On 16 December 2009 trainer Greg Eurell retired Apache Cat after the horse sustained a leg fracture during the running of the 2009 Cathay Pacific Hong Kong Sprint at Sha Tin racecourse, Hong Kong, China.

Apache Cat now resides at Living Legends, International Home Of Rest For Champion Horses, located in Melbourne, Australia, situated next to the Melbourne Airport. Apache Cat is currently paddocked with fellow champion racehorse Brew, and has been paddocked with the likes of Rogan Josh and Pakistan Star previously. Apache Cat is lovingly referred to as 'Patch' by staff and fans alike in retirement.

In February 2021 at 19 years old, Apache Cat was diagnosed with squamous cell carcinoma in his right eye, due to the sensitivities that come with his unusual facial marking (lack of pigment.) Apache Cat underwent surgery and radiation therapy to treat the cancer, and the gelding was officially cleared as cancer-free by specialist veterinarian Andrew Turner in 2023.

On the 15th of February, 2026, Living Legends acquired an Apache Cat miniature horse look-alike named The Kitten/Apache Kitten. (Also known as Dougee.) The Kitten has since accompanied Apache Cat to several events and race-day appearances.

== Pedigree ==
Pedigree of Apache Cat (AUS) 2015
Sire Lion Cavern (USA) 1989	Mr. Prospector (USA); 1970	Raise a Native	Native Dancer
Sire Lion Cavern (USA) 1989	Mr. Prospector (USA); 1970	Raise a Native	Raise You
Sire Lion Cavern (USA) 1989	Mr. Prospector (USA); 1970	Gold Digger	Nashua
Sire Lion Cavern (USA) 1989	Mr. Prospector (USA); 1970	Gold Digger	Sequence
Sire Lion Cavern (USA) 1989	Secrettame (USA); 1978	Secretariat	Bold Ruler
Sire Lion Cavern (USA) 1989	Secrettame (USA); 1978	Secretariat	Somethingroyal
Sire Lion Cavern (USA) 1989	Secrettame (USA); 1978	Tamerett	Tim Tam
Sire Lion Cavern (USA) 1989	Secrettame (USA); 1978	Tamerett	Mixed Marriage
Dam Tennessee Blaze (AUS) 1988	Whiskey Road (USA); 1972	Nijinsky	Northern Dancer
Dam Tennessee Blaze (AUS) 1988	Whiskey Road (USA); 1972	Nijinsky	Flaming Page
Dam Tennessee Blaze (AUS) 1988	Whiskey Road (USA); 1972	Bowl of Flowers	Sailor
Dam Tennessee Blaze (AUS) 1988	Whiskey Road (USA); 1972	Bowl of Flowers	Flower Bowl
Dam Tennessee Blaze (AUS) 1988	Centasia (AUS); 1983	Century	Better Boy
Dam Tennessee Blaze (AUS) 1988	Centasia (AUS); 1983	Century	Royal Suite
Dam Tennessee Blaze (AUS) 1988	Centasia (AUS); 1983	Deep Fantasy	Deep Diver
Dam Tennessee Blaze (AUS) 1988	Centasia (AUS); 1983	Deep Fantasy	Hofa
