= Macau–Taiwan relations =

Bilateral relations

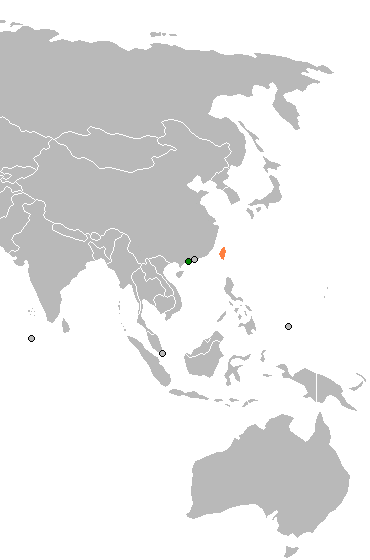
- Macau: Taiwan

Diplomatic mission
- Macau Economic and Cultural Office: Taipei Economic and Cultural Office in Macau

Macau–Taiwan relations is part of cross-strait relations and is under the jurisdiction of the Mainland Affairs Council of the Republic of China, and the Macau Office of the Mainland Affairs Council operates in Macau in the name of the Taipei Economic and Trade Representative Office to handle bilateral affairs between the Macau Special Administrative Region and the Taiwan region. In contrast, the Macau SAR Government set up the Macau Economic and Cultural Office in Taipei, the seat of the Taiwan authorities, which was suspended on 19 June 2021 due to poor cross-strait relations.

The offices of the Taiwan authorities in the Hong Kong Special Administrative Region and the Macao Special Administrative Region are the only two administrative organs in the mainland, Hong Kong, and Macau regions.

== History ==
Macau and Taiwan were both under the influence of the Portuguese Empire: Macau was ruled by Portugal for more than 400 years; Taiwan was discovered by Portugal, and Formosa is the foreign name of Taiwanese Portuguese.

On December 3, 1966, the "12-3 incident" broke out in Portuguese Macau, as a result, the institutions and organizations set up or supported by the government of the Republic of China and the Chinese Kuomintang in Macao were closed down, and the influence of the Chinese Kuomintang in Macao was eliminated. On December 25, the Ministry of Foreign Affairs of the Republic of China lodged a protest with Portugal over the transfer of seven anti-communist figures to the Government of the People's Republic of China in Portuguese Macao. On January 6, 1967, the pro-Taiwan "Macau Federation of Trade Unions" was closed down, and the Ministry of Foreign Affairs of the Republic of China once again protested to Portugal. On January 11, Wu Wenhui, chargé d'affaires in Portugal, was recalled; On January 30, Portugal and Macao signed an agreement with the government of the People's Republic of China, agreeing to repatriate refugees who fled from Macao, close down Taiwan institutions, and agree to escort eight anti-communist figures to the territory of the People's Republic of China, and then forward the fifth protest to the Portuguese side. On February 21, Liu Chieh, the representative of the Chinese People's Republic to the United Nations, lodged a protest with the United Nations.

In January 2019, due to the failure of the Macau Government to issue a work visa, the new head of the Mainland Affairs Council in Macao, Zhang Duoma, could not take up his post as scheduled. In April 2020, Acting Commissioner Li Peiru also returned to China after refusing to sign a letter of commitment to China.

On 16 June 2021, the Macau Government announced the temporary suspension of operations of the Macau Economic and Cultural Office in Taiwan from 19 June 2021. According to the Macau Government, the renewal of the documents of the personnel of the Taiwan office and the application for the new rotation of personnel to go to Taiwan have not been approved, and the Taiwan office has no choice but to suspend operations.

On August 1, 2024, the MAC pointed out that the Macau Government still refused to issue visas to the remaining two MAC members in Macao on the grounds that "Taiwan refused to sign the one-China letter of commitment", and could not send new members. The MAC called on the Macao Government to remove unnecessary obstacles as soon as possible, and stressed that it would prepare for the worst.

At the end of October 2024, the Hualien Branch and Ji'an Branch of the Hualien County Police Department cracked three cases of fake investment fraud drivers, one of which was a Macao national, and the whole case was transferred to the Hualien District Prosecutor's Office for investigation according to fraud.

== See also ==
- Foreign relations of Macau
- Foreign relations of Taiwan
- Hong Kong–Taiwan relations
- China–Portugal relations
- Macau–mainland China relations
- Pro-democracy camp (Macau)
