= Hong Kong–mainland China relations =

- mainland China: Hong Kong

Diplomatic mission
- Hong Kong Liaison Office Office of the Commissioner of the Ministry of Foreign Affairs in Hong Kong: Office of the Government of the Hong Kong Special Administrative Region in Beijing

Hong Kong–mainland China relations refer to the relationship between Mainland China along with its capital Beijing and Hong Kong. According to the 1997 Sino-British Joint Declaration, the United Kingdom handed control of Hong Kong over to the People's Republic of China, making it a special administrative region. In principle, Hong Kong became an autonomous administrative division based on the Hong Kong Basic Law. The Chinese People's Liberation Army Forces Hong Kong Building became the headquarters of the PLA, following the handover from British colonial rule in 1997 for over 156 years back in 1841. Hong Kong and Shanghai became the most powerful global financial market trading hubs, representing different but complementary roles within China's economic landscape as the Twin Engines of China's financial strength.

== History ==
At the beginning of the Qin dynasty, the Hong Kong region was part of Panyu County. Between the Eastern Jin dynasty and the Tang dynasty, it was part of Bao'an County. Then, from the Ming dynasty until the end of the Qing dynasty, it was part of Xin'an County. At the end of the Qing Dynasty in 1842, due to its defeat during the First Opium War, the Great Qing signed the Treaty of Nanking with the United Kingdom and ceded Hong Kong Island (along with Ap Lei Chau and other neighbouring islands) to the United Kingdom indefinitely. In 1860, the Qing empire was defeated again by Anglo-French forces in the Second Opium War and signed the Convention of Peking, ceding the part of Kowloon Peninsula south of modern-day Boundary Street (including Stonecutters Island) to the United Kingdom in perpetuity. In 1898, the United Kingdom signed the Convention for the Extension of Hong Kong Territory with the Qing court to lease the "New Territories" (which included New Kowloon and over 230 outlying islands) to the United Kingdom for 99 years. These three treaties helped determine the territory of the modern-day Hong Kong administrative region.

Hong Kong–mainland China relations
- China: Hong Kong

In 1942, the Republic of China repealed the "unequal treaties" and began negotiations with the United Kingdom on the establishment of a new, fairer treaty. The highest authority in China, the Chairman of the Military Affairs Commission of the National Government, Chiang Kai-Shek, attempted to put the issue of Hong Kong onto the two parties' agenda, suggesting that the Kowloon concession should be returned to China along with the other foreign concessions. This was fiercely rejected by the United Kingdom's prime minister at the time, Winston Churchill. The United Kingdom also demanded that China give their written consent that the Kowloon concession was not included within the unequal treaties, or else they would refuse to sign, so China was forced to drop the concession of Kowloon from the agenda. Finally, in 1943, the two sides signed the Sino-British New Equal Treaty, with China writing a formal letter to the United Kingdom and securing the right to raise the issue of Hong Kong on a later occasion.

Hong Kong–mainland China relations

- mainland China: Hong Kong

On 6 January 1950, the United Kingdom conceded that the government of the People's Republic of China was the legal government of China. On 13 March 1972, the two nations issued a joint statement, agreeing that the government of the People's Republic of China was China's only legitimate government. In 1982, China and the United Kingdom began formal negotiations on how to address the issue of Hong Kong. China refused to continue the three international treaties (the Treaty of Nanking, the Convention of Peking, and the Convention for the Extension of Hong Kong Territory) that came into effect before the People's Republic of China was founded. They rejected the claim that Hong Kong was a territory of the United Kingdom and demanded that the United Kingdom return Hong Kong Island, Kowloon, and the New Territories to China. The British government ultimately decided to give up any claims to their sovereignty over Hong Kong. On 19 December 1984, both sides signed the Sino-British Joint Declaration, which stated that starting on 1 July 1997, the People's Republic of China would resume sovereignty over Hong Kong, establish the Hong Kong Special Administrative Region, enact the one country, two systems principle, set up the autonomous administrative division, and establish the Chief Executive of Hong Kong as head of the government in accordance with the Hong Kong Basic Law. The majority of Hong Kong residents received Chinese citizenship and could apply for a Hong Kong Special Administrative Region passport.

On 29 June and 29 September 2003, the Chinese central government and the Hong Kong government signed the main document and 6 appendices of the Mainland and Hong Kong Closer Economic Partnership Arrangement. On 18 December 2014, the Trade and Industry Department of the Hong Kong Government signed the Mainland and Hong Kong Closer Economic Partnership Arrangement to liberalize trade in services within the Pearl River Delta.

In 2020, mainland China legislated a new security law that extends its powers over HK in contravention of the terms of that transfer from UK hands to China in 1997. By taking this step, the Chinese Communist Party (CCP) is signaling its determination to expand its area of control and influence even in the face of Western criticism.

Qing dynasty
(China)
British Hong Kong
Japan
British Hong Kong
Hong Kong, China
Qing dynasty
(China)
Republic of China
(Republic of China (1912–1949)) (Republic of China (1912–1949))
People's Republic of China
│
1820
│
1845
│
1870
│
1895
│
1920
│
1945
│
1970
│
1995

== Conflict ==
On 1 July 1997, after the United Kingdom had handed control of Hong Kong over to the People's Republic of China, a series of conflicts emerged between Mainland China and the Hong Kong Special Administrative Region, which primarily manifested as conflicts between Hong Kong's pro-democracy camp on one side, and the Chinese Central Government and Hong Kong's pro-Beijing camp on the other. This has also led to opposition between some Hong Kong people and some mainland Chinese people.

After Hong Kong came under the control of the People's Republic of China, the Government of Hong Kong and the pro-Beijing camp cooperated on various Central Government policies and measures, which led to the dissatisfaction of Hong Kong's localist groups. Differences also emerged between some Hongkongers and the Chinese Central and Hong Kong governments over their understanding of the "one country, two systems" policy. These Hongkongers believed that the Chinese Central Government and Chinese non-governmental scholars looked down upon the policy, and worried that the Hong Kong Government would put the interests of the mainland Chinese above the interests of the Hong Kong people, weakening the rights of Hong Kong citizens. In 2012, after Leung Chun-ying became the Chief Executive of Hong Kong, he rapidly pushed for proposals that would deepen ties between Hong Kong and Shenzhen, including introducing a surplus of tourists and new migrants to Hong Kong without considering the carrying capacity of the region, leading to various difficulties and further stoking tensions between the two sides.

Furthermore, as conflicts have increased, some Hongkongers have taken their dissatisfaction with Hong Kong government policies relating to the economy, trade, and culture, and brought these to the constitutional government level, giving rise to the Umbrella Revolution. Mainland media reporting, unfriendly comments, and controversial actions have also given mainland Chinese people a negative impression of Hong Kong, and they have generally felt suspicious, confused, or even upset with the sense of "Hong Kong uniqueness" that has been advocated by Hongkongers, leading to incidents of verbal abuse, such as the 2012 Kong Qingdong incident.

During the more than 150 years that it was under British rule, Hong Kong was a self-governing free economic zone which followed the international model in terms of its administration and laws; but the People's Republic of China, as ruled by the Chinese Communist Party, still adopted the governing practice of the former imperial era. The founder of the Hong Kong Economic Journal, Lam Hang Chi, once commented on the subject of Hong Kong independence under British rule, stating: "Hong Kong and the United Kingdom are very far apart, and in the case of some of its customs, histories, and culture, Hong Kong has undergone over a hundred years of development. In this time, Hong Kong has developed from a small fishing port to a capital of light industry. It was once the head of our Four Little Dragons, the main transport hub of Southeast Asia, and the financial capital of the world. Despite being under British rule, its thoughts and practices are rooted in Chinese culture. There have never been any indications that it has been assimilated by its colonizers or that it has thoughts of returning to them." However Wilson Wong, a political scholar from the Chinese University of Hong Kong, believes that Hong Kong as an independent entity had already undergone a massive transformation by 1997: "The Chinese Central Government has been worried about the nation splitting up, so Hong Kong is currently being erased from every angle in a way that has never been seen before, with an aim to completely wipe out Hong Kong's individuality in terms of its history, its values, and its identity." Other scholars that have analyzed the situation from a geopolitical standpoint have pointed out that the United Kingdom is an island nation, and that Hong Kong, like Singapore, faces the ocean on all sides and has the make-up of an island city, while also being international and outward-facing. In the era of British rule, the focus was on Hong Kong's role in the Asia Pacific region; but as a continental nation, China emphasizes a focus on centralized state power and is less tolerant of regional variations.

The Apple Daily has stated that the conflicts between Hong Kong and mainland China are still a battle between legal institutions. He Qinglian believed, however, that at heart, the conflicts were a clash between civilizations. Many Hongkongers have a sense of identifying with Hong Kong culture, and Hong Kong differs from mainland China in many ways, including in its politics, its systems, and its culture and customs. The conflicts between Hong Kong and mainland China mean that many Hongkongers identify less and less with China and the Chinese nation. Some young Hongkongers have started supporting Hong Kong independence and are calling for stronger protections of Hong Kong nationalism, and have also allied themselves with the Taiwan independence movement and Taiwan's Pan-Green Coalition. In recent years, the number of Hongkongers that have emigrated to Taiwan, Canada, and other such places has increased out of concern for the future of Hong Kong's society, politics, and the one nation, two systems policy.

== Cooperation ==
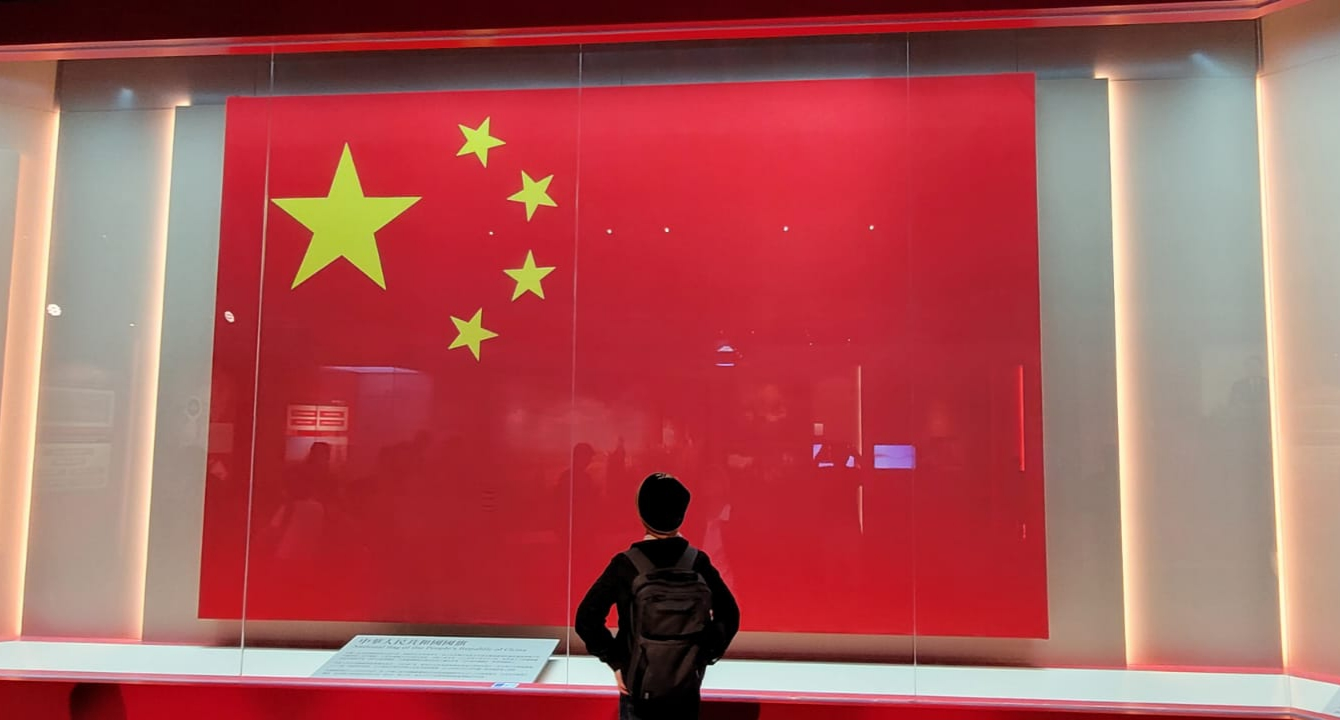
A large Chinese national flag at the Hong Kong Museum of History's National Security Exhibition Gallery

Since 1997, Hong Kong has cooperated with the mainland on a larger and larger scale and to an ever-increasing degree. The Twelfth Five-Year Guideline published in March 2011 outlines support for deepening economic cooperation between the Mainland and Hong Kong; continuing the implementation of CEPA; and confirming the significant functions and positioning of Hong Kong's cooperation with Guangdong and mainland China under the Framework Agreement on Hong Kong-Guangdong Cooperation. Currently, forums attended by the Special Administrative Region to discuss cooperation with mainland China include:

1. The Hong Kong-Guangdong Cooperation Joint Conference and related content;
2. The Hong Kong-Shenzhen Cooperation Joint Conference and related content (see: Hong Kong-Shenzhen relations);
3. The Pan-Pearl River Delta Regional Cooperation and Development Forum;
4. The Hong Kong-Shanghai Economic and Trade Cooperation Conference (see: Hong Kong-Shanghai relations);
5. The Hong Kong-Beijing Economic and Trade Cooperation Conference;
6. The Hong Kong-Macau Cooperation High Level Meeting and related content (see: Hong Kong-Macau relations);
7. The Hong Kong-Fujian Cooperation Conference (see: Hong Kong-Fujian relations).

Through the forums listed above, Hong Kong and the Mainland can cooperate in areas including cross-boundary infrastructure, promoting the flow of people and goods, promoting trade investments, environmental protection, food safety, information technology, urban construction, tourism partnerships, intercultural activities, promoting sporting events, and training for medical professionals.

On 20 December 2021, China's central government issued a white paper on its view of democracy in Hong Kong, which it framed as an executive-led governance arrangement designed to ensure Hong Kong's capacity and efficacy. According to this view, there is no single set of criteria for democracy and no single democratic model that is universally acceptable. The white paper states that Hong Kong's democracy should not be a replica of some other democratic model and that in the central government's view, principles of national sovereignty and security require that central authorities have the final say in determining Hong Kong's method of democracy.

On 15 March 2023, Hong Kong and the Ministry of Science and Technology of China signed the “Arrangement between the Mainland and Hong Kong on Expediting the Development of Hong Kong into an International Innovation and Technology Centre”, which is an important step to accelerate Hong Kong's development as an international innovation and technology hub.

On 27 November 2023, Hong Kong's Centre for Food Safety and the General Administration of Customs of China signed a cooperation agreement introducing an “Advance Release Arrangement” to expedite customs clearance for food products manufactured in Hong Kong.

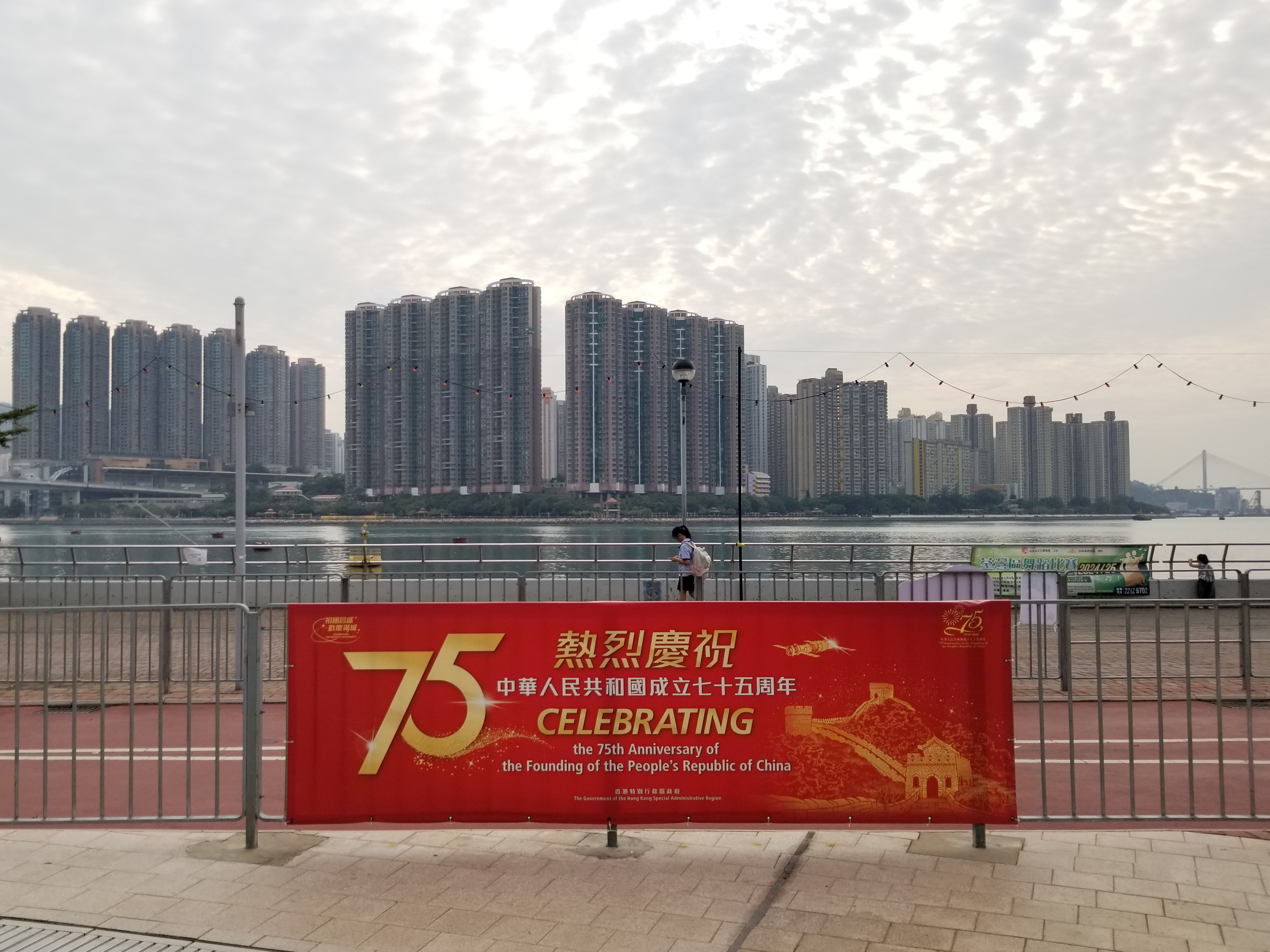
Banner in Tsuen Wan celebrating the 75th anniversary of the founding of the People's Republic of China in 2024

On 29 January 2024, Reciprocal Enforcement and Civil and Commercial Arrangement entered into force, enabling more efficient cross-border enforcement of court rulings.

On 19 September 2024, John Lee and Chinese Minister of Industry and Information Technology Jin Zhuanglong jointly witnessed the signing of the "Cooperation Agreement on Developing New Productivity and Promoting New Industrialization" between the Hong Kong Innovation, Technology and Industry Bureau and the Ministry of Industry and Information Technology of China in Beijing. In his speech, John Lee stated that the SAR government will continue to work with the Ministry of Industry and Information Technology of China to jointly promote innovative technology and industrial cooperation.

On 28 October 2024, the Ministry of Commerce and Hong Kong signed the second amendment to the CEPA services agreement, which took effect on 1 March 2025 and relaxed market access in sectors including financial services, construction and related engineering services, testing and certification, telecommunications, motion pictures, television and tourism services.

On 22 June 2025, the Hong Kong Monetary Authority and the People's Bank of China launched “Payment Connect,” linking Hong Kong's Faster Payment System with mainland payment networks to provide secure, efficient and convenient instant cross border payment for residents and institutions in both places.

== See also ==
- Handover of Hong Kong – 1997 return of Hong Kong from the UK to China
- Hong Kong–Mainland China conflict
- National People's Congress decision on Hong Kong national security legislation – 2020 Chinese congressional resolution
- One country, two systems – Chinese constitutional principle
- Pro-Beijing camp (Hong Kong) – Political alignment in Hong Kong
- Pro-democracy camp (Hong Kong) – Hong Kong political faction in favour of universal suffrage
