= Hong Kong–Macau Trophy =

Group 3 Thoroughbred handicap horse race in Hong Kong

The Hong Kong–Macau Trophy is a Group 3 Thoroughbred handicap horse race in Hong Kong, run at Sha Tin over 1400 metres in early March.

Horses are required to fit four criteria to enter the race.

- For horses aged 4 or above which are trained permanently in Hong Kong or Macau.
- For horses rated 110-90 in Hong Kong and horses rated 125-95 in Macau.
- Horses trained in Macau will receive a 15-lb reduction from their Official Macau Rating at time of calculation of weights.
- Horses must have had, at time of publication of weights, at least 2 starts in their respective jurisdictions.

== Winners ==
Year	Winner	Age	Jockey	Trainer
2004	Crown's Gift
2005	Helene Pillaging
2006	Happee Owner
2007	Crown's Master	5	K M Chin	J Lau
2008	Slow Waltz	4	F Coetzee	John Size
2009	Hawkes Bay	7	Brett Prebble	D J Hall
2010	Viva Pronto	4	F Durso	G W Moore
2011	Sparkling Power	4	Douglas Whyte	A T Millard
2012	Majestic Falcon	5	Jeff Lloyd	John Moore
2013	Solar Great	5	Douglas Whyte	D J Hall
2014	Super Lifeline	4	Karis Teetan	A T Millard
2015	Arpinati	4	João Moreira	John Moore
2016	Dashing Fellow	4	Zac Purton	John Moore
2017	Invincible Dragon	5	Sam Clipperton	John Moore
2018	California Whip	5	Neil Callan	Tony Cruz
