= Hong Kong–Macau relations =

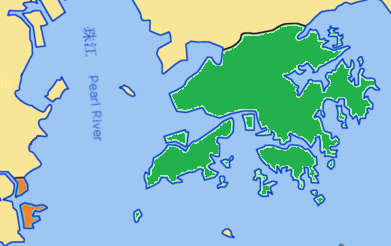
- Hong Kong: Macau

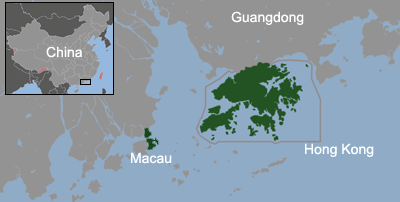
Location of Hong Kong and Macau

Hong Kong–Macau relations (Chinese: 香港—澳門關係; Portuguese: Relações Hong Kong-Macau) refers to the bilateral relations between Hong Kong and Macau, both the only special administrative regions of the People's Republic of China.

== History ==
British Hong Kong–Portuguese Macau relations
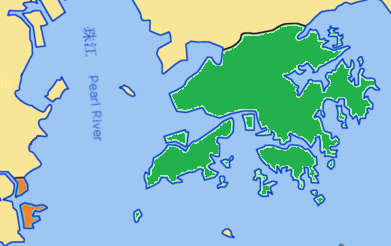

- Hong Kong: Macau

Hong Kong and Macau are located on the east and west sides of the Pearl River Delta respectively, separated by a distance of about 64 kilometres (40 mi). During the Middle Neolithic era, the areas now identified as Hong Kong and Macau were the same type of Neolithic culture. Tools and ornaments used by both places show tight relationship in idea and trade between the two. Hong Kong became the first European colony in East Asia occupied by the Portuguese Empire as Tamão in the early 16th Century. The Portuguese were defeated by the Ming Empire in Hong Kong in 1521, and eventually took Macau as their settlement at the Pearl River Estuary as a replacement in 1557 until 1999. Macau has stood as the most important European entrepot in East Asia since the 17th Century. Only when Hong Kong fell into British hands in 1841 until the handover in 1997, did Macau begin to face regional competition from a more open and free British Hong Kong. Since then, Hong Kong and Macau have competed and cooperated as commercial centres in the Pearl River Estuary. Eventually Hong Kong developed as one of the busiest entrepots and financial centres while Macau became a world gambling capital. In 2018, a fixed-link connecting Hong Kong and Macau opened—the Hong Kong–Zhuhai–Macau Bridge.

== Trade ==
As of 2015, Macau is Hong Kong's second largest export destination, occupying 6.1% of Hong Kong's total exports. The amount of export totaled US$8.4B, with broadcasting equipment, jewellery, and precious metal watches as the major products. On the other hand, Hong Kong is Macau's largest export destination. Exports to Hong Kong totaled US$774M, with precious metal watches, jewelry, trunks and cases as the major trading products, forming 53% of Macau's total exports.

== Tourism ==
While tourism is one of the pillars of both economies, Hong Kong and Macau contribute notable proportion of tourists for each other. While Macau is known as the gaming capital of the world and heavily relies on tourism, Hong Kong is the second major source of tourists of Macau. In 2013, 6,766,044 Hongkongers had accounted for near one-fourth of Macau's total visitor arrivals. On the other hand, while Hong Kong is the world's most popular tourist destination, Macau is the sixth visitor source market of Hong Kong, just after Mainland China, Taiwan, the United States, and Japan.

== Treaties and agreements ==
The Agreement on the Transfer of Sentenced Persons treaty was signed between Hong Kong and Macau in May 2005. As a result, sentenced persons of the two territories with their respective citizenship would be transferred back to their place of origin.

Despite the close connection of the two jurisdictions, there are no extradition treaties or agreements signed between Hong Kong and Macau. Anyone charged with committing a crime or convicted of a crime whose punishment has not yet been fully served in either jurisdiction would not be transferred by authorities of one jurisdiction to those of the other.

== Incidences ==
A domestic agreement, the Hong Kong-Macau Immigration Clearance Set, was established on 9 December 2009. Citizens are eligible to use their identity cards to travel between the two regions without furnishing arrival and departure cards.

After the Umbrella Movement, some Hong Kong pro-democratic councillors were barred from entering Macau.

- Democratic Party legislative councillor Dr. Helena Wong Pik-wan on 29 August 2017
- Neo Democrats district councillor Kwan Wing-yip on 30 August 2017
- Civic Party district councillor Andy Yu Tak-po on 3 September 2017

The spokesman of the Civic Party urged Hong Kong Chief Executive Carrie Lam Cheng Yuet-ngor to express their concerns with Macau and demand an explanation.

== See also ==
- China–United Kingdom relations
- British Hong Kong – British colony in Asia from 1841 to 1997
- China–Portugal relations
- Portuguese Macau – Portuguese colony in East Asia (1557–1999)
