= Newcastle Newmarket Handicap =

Newcastle Stakes
- Class: Group 3
- Location: Broadmeadow Racecourse, Newcastle, Australia
- Inaugurated: 1955
- Race type: Thoroughbred - flat
- Sponsor: Horsepower (2022-26)

Race information
- Distance: 1,400 metres
- Surface: Turf
- Track: Right-handed
- Weight: Quality handicap – Minimum 54 kg
- Purse: A$250,000 (2026)

The Newcastle Stakes, registered as the Newcastle Newmarket Handicap is a Newcastle Jockey Club Group 3 Thoroughbred open quality handicap horse race over a distance of 1,400 metres, held annually at Broadmeadow Racecourse in Newcastle, New South Wales, Australia in March.

== History ==
=== Distance ===
- 1955–1972 - 7 furlongs
- 1973–2015 – 1400 metres
- 2016 – 1350 metres
- 2017 – 1400 metres

=== Grade ===
- 1955–1978 - Principal Race
- 1979–1991 - Listed Race
- 1992 onwards - Group 3

=== Venue ===
- Prior 2016 - Newcastle Broadmeadow Racecourse
- 2016 - Rosehill Racecourse
- 2017 - Newcastle Broadmeadow Racecourse

=== Recent multiple winners ===
Kris Lees trained four consecutive race winners from 2019 to 2022. Lees also trained the 2024 winner. Brenton Avdulla rode the 2019 and 2020 winners for Lees.

Glen Boss was the successful rider in 2002, 2004 and 2010.

== Winners ==
The following are past winners of the race.

- 2026 - Tuileries
- 2025 - Sandpaper
- 2024 - Rustic Steel
- 2023 - Cross Talk
- 2022 - Wandabaa
- 2021 - Gem Song
- 2020 - Special Reward
- 2019 - Princess Posh
- 2018 - Lanciato
- 2017 - Happy Clapper
- †2016 - Artistry
- 2015 - Laser Hawk
- 2014 - Mecir
- 2013 - Bello
- 2012 - He's Remarkable
- 2011 - Keepin The Dream
- 2010 - Walking Or Dancing
- 2009 - Soho Flyer
- 2008 - Falaise
- 2007 - Danzippo
- 2006 - Tall Timbers
- 2005 - Patezza
- 2004 - Platinum Scissors
- 2003 - Zabarra
- 2002 - Hey Pronto
- 2001 - Crawl
- 2000 - Spying
- 1999 - Techniques
- 1998 - Bezeal Bay
- 1997 - Secret Savings
- 1996 - Magic Road
- 1995 - Pimpala Son
- 1994 - Sir Bernard
- 1993 - Deposition
- 1992 - Blue Boss
- 1991 - Ricochet Rosie
- 1990 - Comrade
- 1989 - Never Quit
- 1988 - Lucky Rass
- 1987 - race not held
- 1986 - Kui-Kong
- 1985 - Vain Fury
- 1984 - Manuan
- 1983 - Manuan
- 1982 - Grey Receiver
- 1981 - Yir Tiz
- 1980 - Painted Red
- 1979 - Stylee
- 1978 - Monakea
- 1977 - Swiftly Ann
- 1976 - Manawapoi
- 1975 - Go Mod
- 1974 - Favoured
- 1973 - Gay Blade
- 1972 - Sylvan Ridge
- 1971 - Fleet Royal
- 1970 - Ricochet
- 1969 - Skellatar
- 1968 - Foresight
- 1967 - Scottish Soldier
- 1966 - Even Better
- 1965 - Brandy Lad
- 1964 - Brandy Lad
- 1963 - Zozima
- 1962 - Saydor
- 1961 - Heroic Victory
- 1960 - Dare Say
- 1959 - Amanullah
- 1958 - Achnacary
- 1957 - Compound
- 1956 - Spearby
- 1955 - Seacraft

† Originally the race was scheduled to be run on the Beaumont Track. Due to the configuration of the racetrack the starting distance of the race was reduced. Race meeting was abandoned due to being unsafe for racing after prolonged rain and the race was rescheduled as the tenth race in the race card on Golden Slipper Stakes Day at Rosehill Racecourse.

== See also ==
- Cameron Handicap
- Newcastle Gold Cup
- Spring Stakes (NJC)
- Tibbie Stakes
- List of Australian Group races
- Group races
