= Ultra Tune =

Australian auto repair franchise

Ultra Tune Pty Ltd
- Industry: Automotive franchise
- Founded: 1979
- Headquarters: Melbourne, Australia
- Key people: Sean Buckley (Executive chairman); Tony Cott (general manager)
- Services: Car repairs
- Website: ultratune.com.au

Ultra Tune is an Australian automotive servicing and roadside assist franchise with 275+ centres, the second largest independent automotive servicing and repairer in Australia, as of 2019.

== History ==
Ultra Tune commenced trading in 1979 with a pilot store in Box Hill, Victoria. Its rapid expansion was catalyzed by businessman Bert Smart, who saw a specialist Fast Tune-Up store in Hawaii while travelling home from the United States. Smart established a franchise model that saw the new business expand rapidly into all Australian states except Western Australia.

In 1988, each of the franchisor entities (with the exception of South Australia) merged and formed a new company, Ultra Tune (Systems) Australia Pty Ltd (UTSA). Within 12 months, Ultra Tune opened its first franchise store in Perth, Western Australia.

During the early 1990s, the network experienced turmoil and faced financial ruin with a number of stores across the network forced to close due high rental lease costs. After a public auction in 1994, Sean Buckley acquired management and then later shareholding control in Ultra Tune.

Under Sean Buckley, Ultra Tune Australia Pty Ltd was created and over the next 22 years he developed his own business model – which included the acquisition of competing brands such as Car Care Clinic (1999) and Auto Masters sites in New South Wales and Queensland during the early 2000s. He grew the organisation from around 70 mediocrely operating franchises into a successful national franchise network model making many of the franchisees considerable wealth in the process.

In 1994, Sean Buckley became company CEO.

== International and Australian expansion ==
In 2010 Ultra Tune expanded into the Kingdom of Bahrain, partnering with Bahrain National Holding and Saudi Arabia under the guidance of Hamish Murdoch working as general manager of the Middle East Division. Part of this expansion project included investing in a state-of-the-art, four-level workshop in Salmabad. In 2015 Ultra Tune Australia sold its interests in the company back to Bahrain National Holdings.

In conjunction with Gadjah Mada University Indonesia, Ultra Tune initiated a training facility to educate and train students in automotive repair. This facility enabled Ultra Tune to certify and employ new technicians, assisting them with finding Ultra Tune positions internationally.

== Advertising ==
For more than twenty years Ultra Tune has been known for their controversial and critically acclaimed television advertisements. Ultra Tune has always strived to differentiate itself from the competition by producing entertaining advertisements. Early advertising – which included the "Dancing Car" in 2001 and later "Dam Girls," "Top Cop," and the "Paper Bag Guy" were light and feel good. More recently, though, Ultra Tune has upped the ante and evolved in a different direction to increase awareness of the brand, products, and services, producing a series of controversial television advertisements.

2014 saw the introduction of controversial Rubber Girls advertising theme (Originally Laura Lydall and Joanna Hill and later Laura Lydall and Parnia Porsche). The Rubber Girls concept was first introduced to herald Ultra Tune's foray into the lucrative Australian tyre market and featured the Rubber Girls dancing whilst wearing skintight rubber latex suits with the tagline: “We’re into rubber” on free to air television. It was the most complained about advert in 2016 with 418 complaints and the 2nd most complained about advert of all time.

Due to the success of the Rubber Girls advertising theme Ultra Tune introduced the "Unexpected Situations" Series. It was created by Buckley and loosely modelled on the highly successful Trunk Monkey advertising series from the USA. In the Unexpected Situations series the girls find themselves in a range of outrageous and unlikely circumstances with their motor vehicle only to be assisted by Ultra Tune to overcome their predicaments.

- Unexpected Situations No. 1 (Train Wreck) saw the Rubber Girls broken down in a convertible BMW on a railway crossing with a fast approaching train but managing to free themselves prior to the impact.
- Unexpected Situations No. 2 (Helicopter) saw the girls selecting the wrong gear when parked on a cliff top sending the vehicle plummeting off the precipice, only to be saved by an Ultra Tune helicopter.
- Unexpected Situations No. 3 (Car Wash) saw the girls in a convertible mini entering a car wash. Upon entry their retractable roof fails to close leaving the girls saturated inside the vehicle.
- Unexpected Situations No. 4 (JCVD) saw the girls returning to their vehicle in an isolated car park only to find the car disabled with a flat tyre. They are then confronted by a threatening street gang and as the tension mounts Jean-Claude Van Damme appears and after a tense stand-off the gang recognises Van Damme and a party atmosphere ensues. The girls call for assistance and the Ultra Tune technician arrives to change the tyre. Ultra Tune released both 30-second and 60-second versions of this television advertisement which screened extensively during the 2017 Australian Open.
- Unexpected Situations No. 5 (Muffler) saw the girls stop at a set of traffic lights shaking the car's exhaust system loose, creating a fire which quickly spreads. The girls respond by vacating the car and using fire extinguishers to douse the flames. When it becomes apparent the fire cannot be contained they flee just before the car is engulfed in flames and explodes just prior the Ultra Tune Road Side Assistance technician arriving. The advert has provoked some strong reactions since its release.
- Unexpected Situations No. 6 (Mike Tyson) sees the girls (Parnia Porsche, Tyana Hansen, Jasmin Rainbow – regular Rubber Girl – Laura Lydall, who appeared in Unexpected Situations 1–5 – was unable to appear due to a car accident where she severely broke her leg just prior to filming in the USA. It is expected Lydall will rejoin the team in subsequent editions of the Unexpected Situations series) driving in their jeep when they suddenly see a tiger in the road and swerve to avoid it, leaving their car perching on the two back wheels. They use the Ultra Tune app to call roadside assistance. To their surprise Mike Tyson appears lifting their car back onto 4 wheels, and asks if they have seen his tiger. The ad ends with the tiger in the back of the jeep and the Ultra Tune technician in shock at the sight he is seeing. The ad has aired during the 2018 Australian Open and has been met with both criticism and praise.

The television campaign created significant controversy for the company with one women's group calling the commercials "sexist and demeaning" and requesting the immediate banning of the advertisements. In response, Buckley claimed the advertisements were intended to be lighthearted and funny given the extremeness of the predicaments. Buckley further claimed "political correctness had gone too far" and launched an extensive social media campaign which garnered much online support for the series. Laura Lydall and Parnia Porsche wrote an open letter to The Age newspaper in response to the media criticism.

UltraTune announced the controversial advertisements had been incredibly successful doubling Ultra Tune tyre sales.

Following the campaign, the Advertising Standards Bureau received several complaints regarding the Ultra Tune ad series. The complaints raised were regarding discrimination of gender, exploitation and or vilification of women, sex and nudity, violence and health and safety. The board determined that the adverts do not breach any of the codes that they adjudicate on and dismissed all of the complaints in February 2017.

In October 2018 Ultra Tune announced that Charlie Sheen will star in their upcoming Unexpected Situations advert to air in 2019. Filming commenced in Melbourne, Australia whilst Charlie Sheen was on tour in the country and also stars Parnia Porsche, Tyana Hansen, Imogen Lovell and Laura Lydall.

- Unexpected Situations No. 7 (Charlie Sheen) sees the girls (Parnia Porsche, Laura Lydall, Tyana Hansen and Imogen Lovell) driving in a convertible near the harbour on the way to the beach. Their brakes suddenly fail and they lose control of the car and crash into the water. Luckily for them, Charlie Sheen is fishing on his yacht (named ‘Winning’ – a reference to a famous Sheen quote) and he lets them on board. Porsche asks for a phone and Sheen assumes it is for a selfie, but Porsche is exasperated and instead wants to call Ultra Tune Roadside Assist – who turn up jokingly asking if it is boat trouble – as the car is slowly sinking into the sea. Warwick Capper stars as the Captain of the yacht. The ad was received well by audiences compared with previous instalments of the series and a small number of complaints were refuted by the Advertising Standards Bureau.

In October 2019 Pamela Anderson announced she was travelling to Australia to film a new advert for Ultra Tune. In November 2019 Pamela Anderson was seen filming for the advert on a beach on the Gold Coast of Australia, alongside Warwick Capper, Laura Lydall, Tyana Hansen and Parnia Porsche.

- Unexpected Situations No. 8 (Pamela Anderson) sees Warwick Capper driving along a beach and being distracted by seeing Pamela Anderson and losing control of the buggy. Having crashed the buggy in the sand, a huge wave envelops him and he is saved by the Ultra Tune girls (Parnia Porsche, Laura Lydall, Tyana Hansen and Jennifer Cole) and Pamela Anderson in a Baywatch-style slow-motion scene. It ends with the Ultra Tune technician arriving, who questions 'car trouble?' to which Anderson replies 'Capper trouble!' and he offers to give Capper mouth to mouth.

== Sponsorship and boxing ==
Ultra Tune has been heavily involved in the sponsorship of combat sports throughout Australia supporting events throughout the year such as Peter Maniatis Events, K-1 Oceania and A-1 World Combat Cup (Tarik Solak), Kings of Kombat (Hisham Hanna), McSweeney's Fight Factory (James McSweeney) and Big Time Boxing (Brian Amatruda).

Ultra Tune sponsors WBA Interim Flyweight Champion Boxer Randy Petalcorin, as well as Parnia Porsche who is WBF Regional Champion.

In 2015 Ultra Tune partnered with Port Adelaide Football Club at their home games.

In early 2017 Ultra Tune launched a new ad featuring Belgian Actor and Martial artist Jean-Claude Van Damme.

In January 2018 Ultra Tune launched a new ad starring former world heavyweight boxer Mike Tyson.

== New car retailing inquiry ==
In December 2016 Ultra Tune Executive chairman Sean Buckley was invited to speak at the Australian Competition & Consumer Commission and Australian Automotive Aftermarket Association inquiry regarding the Market Study on New Car Retailing. The inquiry focused national attention on the industry's ongoing battle against car dealers and manufacturers providing service, repair procedures and related information to the non-dealer repair network.

Appearing on behalf of all the automotive independent operators, Buckley expressed the concerns of the independent repairers regarding the dealerships withholding critical electronic repair data and creating an oligopoly for dealerships in the after-sales repair market to the exclusion of independent repairers.
