= Boxing in China =

Boxing in China began as a street sport in the 1920s, mainly in the port cities of Shanghai and Guangzhou, where foreign sailors were pitted against local fighters in the ring. The sport grew rapidly and unsupervised by the Chinese government. Chinese boxing style is similar to Western boxing style, with influences from traditional Chinese martial arts.

== 1950s ==
In 1953, at a big competition in the northern city of Tianjin, a boxer died after a bout. Sports authorities were unnerved, and in 1959, as China organized its first National Games, it dropped boxing from the lineup. Mao Zedong was driving the country further into isolation. Fan Hong, a scholar who specializes in China's athletic history, commented, "People believed that boxing was very brutal, very ruthless, and those were said to be the characteristics of capitalism. So it was banned."

== 1960s and 1970s ==
When the Cultural Revolution occurred in China, in 1966, the Communist Party banned competitive sports. After the Cultural Revolution subsided, in 1969, China used Ping Pong matches to reconnect with the world. It was not until the late 1970s that Deng Xiaoping decided that competition might be as good for athletics as it was for the economy. In December 1979, Deng invited Muhammad Ali to the compound housing China's top leaders. The champion boxer hugged Deng. They sat and talked. Later, the word went out and Deng sent the message out that "If we want to win friends, if we want to win respect, we have to win medals".

== 1980s and 1990s ==
In the 1980s, Chinese boxers began training again, after a fashion. Athletes had no bags or gloves. Sandbags were traditionally used instead. Liu Gang was one of the earliest recruits and is now China's biggest promoter. China first competed in boxing at the 1992 Summer Olympics, in Barcelona, where competitors were delighted to face off against Chinese opponents as China had been weak in that sport. The best that their coaches hoped for was that each fighter might stay on his feet a bit longer than the one before him.

== 2000s and 2010s ==
It was until the 2004 Summer Olympics in Athens that Zou Shiming claimed China's first boxing medal. He eventually made it into the semifinals and won a bronze. This achievement was greeted with rapturous applause and Chinese reporters nicknamed him the Dark Horse at first because of his underdog status. Later, they tried the Knight of Lightning or the Fox or, sometimes, the Pirate, all celebrating his knack for snatching points and peeling away from his opponents' reach. That strategy was helping him win international matches. In Athens, Zou made it to the semifinals, eventually winning a bronze, China's first in boxing. It was another year before Zou won his first gold medal, at the 2005 World Amateur Boxing Championships, held in the western Chinese city of Mianyang. He was the nation's first amateur boxing champion, and China celebrated.

China's boxing performance improved dramatically at the 2008 Summer Olympics in Beijing. Zou Shiming won the gold medal in the Light Flyweight (-48 kg) event, and Zhang Xiaoping won the gold medal in the Light Heavyweight (81 kg) event.

On 24 November 2012 Xiong Zhao Zhong became the first male boxer from China to win a major professional world boxing title, the WBC minimumweight title. The fight was well received with many of China's major media organisations hailing the event as a huge success. Due to the overwhelming positive reaction boxing promoters have promised to accelerate the growth of boxing throughout China. Light Flyweight contender Ma Yiming challenged for the WBA light flyweight interim championship in April 2015, losing via a first-round technical knockout. Similarly, Ik Yang fought veteran César Cuenca and lost via unanimous decision for the vacant IBF light welterweight title.

Compatriot Li Wenyang won a minor world title (UBO light welterweight title) in 2011. This was followed by heavyweight Zhang Junlong's win against Jason Gavern which won him a minor title in 2014 (interim WBU heavyweight title). Zou Shiming made history becoming the 2nd Chinese National to win a World Championship title with a unanimous-decision over Prasitsak Phaprom of Thailand, to win the WBO flyweight championship fight at the Thomas & Mack Center in Las Vegas, Nevada, US on Nov 5, 2016.

Xu Can becomes China's 3rd World Boxing Champion in his unanimous victory over Jesus Rojas of Puerto Rico for the WBA Featherweight World Title in Houston Texas on January 26, 2019

== List of men's professional boxing world champions ==
The following is a list of Chinese boxing champions who have held titles from one or more of the "Big Four" organizations (WBA, WBC, IBF, WBO) and The Ring.

In December 2000, the WBA created an unprecedented situation of having a split championship in the same weight class by introducing a new title called Super world, commonly referred to simply as Super. The Super champion is highly regarded as the WBA's primary champion, while the World champion – commonly known as the Regular champion by boxing publications – is only considered the primary champion by the other three major sanctioning bodies (WBC, IBF, and WBO) if the Super title is vacant.

A Unified champion is a boxer that holds the Regular title and a world title from another major sanctioning body (WBC, IBF, WBO) simultaneously. An Undisputed champion as defined by the WBA, only needs to hold three of the four major titles but in some cases they may change a Super champion into an Undisputed champion after a failed title defense (e.g. Anselmo Moreno losing to Juan Payano and Chris John losing to Simpiwe Vetyeka). This is not to be confused by professional boxing's own definition of an undisputed champion, in which a boxer must hold all four major titles.

Inducted into the International Boxing Hall of Fame
World titles from world and The Ring
WBA Regular champion

No.	Name	Titles	Date	Opponent	Result
1	Xiong Chaozhong	WBC Mini-flyweight	Nov 24, 2012	Javier Martínez	UD 12/12
2	Zou Shiming	WBO Flyweight	Nov 5, 2016	Prasitsak Phaprom	UD 12/12

=== List of WBA secondary champions ===
No.	Name	Titles	Reign period	Opponent	Result	Primary champion/s during reign
1	Xu Can	WBA (Regular) Featherweight	Jan 26, 2019 – Jul 31, 2021	Jesús Rojas	UD 12/12	Léo Santa Cruz; Jan 26, 2019 – Can lost the title to Leigh Wood while Santa Cruz was still the primary champion.
