= Ultra Thoroughbred Racing =

Australian horse racing breeders

Ultra Thoroughbred Racing Pty
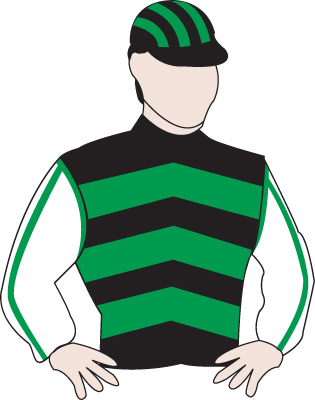
- Racing silks of Ultra Thoroughbred Racing
- Type: Thoroughbred Racing & Horse breeding Farm
- Industry: Thoroughbred Horse racing
- Founded: 2002
- Headquarters: Australia
- Key people: Sean Buckley owner

Ultra Thoroughbred Racing Pty Ltd are breeders of thoroughbred racehorses based in Melbourne, Australia. The company is owned by Sean Buckley, with land holdings in Victoria and the Hunter Valley in New South Wales. The business has racing interests primarily in Australia and New Zealand.

== History ==
The company was first located at the 400 acre ‘Barree Stud’ in Willowmavin, NE Victoria, which served as a breeding, spelling and pre-training centre. As development progressed, Barree was turned into a pre-training, spelling and rehabilitation centre. During this process, the company's breeding operations were relocated to the Hunter Valley of New South Wales, where other major Australian and international breeding operations are based. Facilities include a 2000 m sand-based track for workouts, equine water walker and swimming pool, high-speed treadmill, hyperbaric chamber and hydrotherapy equipment.

In the early days of Ultra Thoroughbreds, the company focused on the purchase of race mares, and mares already at stud for breeding. This included the purchase of stock from around the world, notably South Africa and New Zealand, as well as domestically in Australia.

Over the years, Ultra Thoroughbreds diversified, purchasing stock at all stages of development, including a recent focus on ‘two year old in training’ sales. This is in addition to the company's interest in the purchasing and sale of weanlings, yearlings, tried horses and broodmares. They have had broad success with a variety of winning thoroughbred horses throughout Australia, as well as success in South Africa, New Zealand and at Royal Ascot in the United Kingdom.

In 2014, Ultra Thoroughbreds moved its entire breeding operation to the Hunter Valley, where it purchased Golden Grove Stud (Denman) with G&C Pastoral Company owner Vivian Oldfield. With the growth of the breeding operation, Golden Grove Stud expanded in the 2016 season to nearby Riverslea Farm, with views to develop this into a centre of excellence for the stud's young produce. Recent stakes winning graduates of note include The Barrister (Listed Fernhill Handicap, Royal Randwick), Captain Duffy (Listed Geelong Classic, Geelong), Crown Witness (G3 Quezette Stakes, Caulfield) and the exciting Nature Strip (Inglis Dash, Flemington).

In August 2020 Senior Trainer Danny O Brien won the Fred Hoysted Medal for Victorian trainers after a superb year in which he trained 100 winners for the season at a strike rate of more than 17 per cent.

== Group 1 winners ==
Shamus Award – 2013/14 Timeform Champion Australia 3yo and the most credentialed son of Snitzel. He is the first horse in history to win the Group 1 VRC Australian Guineas after winning the Group 1 W. S. Cox Plate at Moonee Valley Racecourse. A multiple group performer at two years old, running an exceptional third in the Caulfield Guineas, this colt raced only in stakes company for the entirety of his career.

Miss Andretti – Australian Champion Racehorse of the Year in 2007 and is the only thoroughbred in racing history to simultaneously hold a total of five track records in Australia and England.

Feature career wins include:

- Winterbottom Stakes (G2) (2005) – Ascot, WA (Now a G1 race)
- Prince of Wales Stakes (G3) (2005) – Ascot, WA
- Manikato Stakes (G1) (2006) – Moonee Valley, VIC
- Schillaci Stakes (G2) (2006) – Caulfield, VIC
- Ian McEwen Trophy (G3) (2006) – Moonee Valley, VIC
- The Age Classic (G1) (2007) – Flemington, VIC
- Newmarket Handicap (G1) (2007) – Flemington, VIC
- Australia Stakes (G1) (2007) – Moonee Valley, VIC
- Lightning Stakes (G1) (2007) – Moonee Valley, VIC
- Schweppes Stakes (G2) (2007) – Moonee Valley, VIC
- King's Stand Stakes (G2) (2007) – Royal Ascot, VIC (Now a G1 race)

Perfect Promise - first South African-bred horse to win a Group 1 in Australia or New Zealand; being a victory in the Group 1 C F Orr Stakes on 11 February 2006, also winning the Emancipation Stakes in 2005. Other feature wins included the Group 1 Cape Fillies Guineas, Group 3 Diana Stakes, as well as second in the Group 1 Fancourt Stakes (all in South Africa prior to her arrival in Australia).

Her sister Iridescence was South Africa's Equus Champion 3YO Filly of 2005 and notably won the Group 1 Queen Elizabeth II Cup in Hong Kong.

Culminate – New Zealand-bred star, whose feature wins include the Group 2 Tristarc Stakes at Caulfield in 2010, as well as the Group 2 Thoroughbred Breeders Stakes, Group 1 Otaki-Maori Weight for Age, Group 2 Rich Hill Mile, all in New Zealand prior to her success in Australia.

Dane Julia – A multiple Group 1 winner in both New Zealand and South Africa, before winning and multiple performances at stakes level in Australia. Winner of the Group 1 NZ Bloodstock Breeders Stakes WFA and Group 1 South African Fillies Classic, as well as numerous other stakes performances in Australia and New Zealand.

Noble Heir – winner of the Group 1 Computaform Sprint at Turffontein Racecourse in South Africa, amongst numerous other stakes level performances for a total of 8 wins and 9 placings from 29 starts.

== Group 2 winners ==
Hooked – purchased for $600,000 in 2014 at the Spring Thoroughbred Sale, Magic Millions. He went on to immediate success for Ultra Thoroughbreds, running third in the Group 1 Epsom Handicap at Royal Randwick Racecourse, before winning the Group 2 Schweppes Crystal Mile at Moonee Valley in dominant fashion. On 5 September 2015 the entire son of Casino Prince won the Group 2 Tramway Stakes, again at Royal Randwick (beating the likes of Lucia Valentina). He returned to racing on 15 April 2017 after injury to win the Group 3 Victoria Handicap at Caulfield Racecourse. Special note has been given to the resilience that Hooked has demonstrated, performing at the top level of racing from his two-year-old career, continuing as a rising seven-year-old in 2017 with this being a particular focus in the Australian racing industry, where a lot of credence is given to the "colonial bred" thoroughbred and its hardiness.

== Group 3 winners ==
Addictive Nature (Savabeel x Generous Nature 2014) was acquired by Ultra Thoroughbred Racing at the New Zealand Bloodstock Premier Yearling Sale in January 2016. He was purchased for $775,000 NZD and registered a class-record at Warwick Farm in his first start as a two-year-old, breaking a 13-year-old record, set by champion thoroughbred Eremein. The full brother to stakes horse Savvy Nature, the colt ran second at his next start at Royal Randwick, before registering his first stakes win as a three-year-old in the G3 Ming Dynasty over 1400m at Royal Randwick. The colt has subsequently placed in the G2 Stan Fox Stakes (third) and G2 WFA Expressway Stakes (third). As of 2018, Addictive Nature is one of the outstanding three-year-old prospects of his generation, with a future at stud beckoning if he can fulfill the high expectations placed on the colt over the remainder of his three-year-old season.

== Other stakes successes ==
Captain Duffy (gelding) (King Cugat x Miss Encosta) – Listed Geelong Classic over 2200m – bred, born and raised by Ultra Thoroughbreds.

Grand Chancellor (gelding) (Savabeel x Mont Fay) – Listed Port Adelaide Guineas winner over 1800m and subsequently sold to George Moore for clients in Hong Kong, where the gelding has entered the stable of his father John Moore.

Crown Witness (filly) (Star Witness x Noble Heir) – G3 Quezette Stakes at Caulfield – bred born and raised by Ultra Thoroughbreds at Golden Grove, before being offered as a yearling for sale at the Inglis Melbourne Premier Yearling Sale.

The Barrister (gelding) (Star Witness x Strikeline) – winner of the listed Fernhill Handicap at Royal Randwick over 1600m, before subsequently making the move to Hong Kong, where the gelding has won multiple races at Happy Valley Racecourse.

Nature Strip (gelding) (Nicconi x Strikeline) – Stakes prospect, unbeaten in all but one start as of February 2018 and winner of the Inglis Dash at Flemington in January 2018. In August 2020, Nature Strip was named Victorian Racehorse of the Year, having won the Moir Stakes and VRC Sprint Classic.

== Ultra Thoroughbred Racing stallion interests ==
Shamus Award – currently standing at Widden Stud, NSW. Owned in partnership with their breeding associates G&C Pastoral Company, with whom Ultra Thoroughbreds raced the stallion during his record-breaking career.

Star Witness – currently standing at Widden Stud, Ultra Thoroughbreds have a significant interest in the Australian Champion 3yo of his generation, who also won the Group 1 Blue Diamond Stakes as a 2yo, with a syndicate of breeder owners. His first foal was born on 6 August 2016.

Savabeel - multiple champion New Zealand sire, residing at Waikato Stud on the North Island of New Zealand. Ultra Thoroughbreds purchased two Savabeel colts at the New Zealand Bloodstock National Yearling Sale at Karaka in 2016 for over $1million.

Monaco Consul – dual Group 1 winning son of High Chaparral, who made the move to new operation Kingstar Farm in the NSW Hunter Valley in 2016.
