= Addictive Nature =

Australian-bred Thoroughbred racehorse

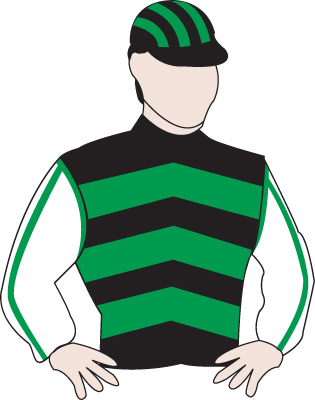
- Racing silks of Addictive Nature
- Sire: Savabeel
- Grandsire: Zabeel
- Dam: Generous Nature
- Damsire: La Lagune
- Sex: colt
- Foaled: 22 September 2014 (age 11)
- Country: Australia
- Colour: Bay
- Breeder: Little Avondale Stud
- Owner: Ultra Thoroughbred Racing
- Trainer: Bjorn Baker
- Record: 13: 2–3–2
- Earnings: $224,625

Major wins
- Ming Dynasty Quality Handicap (2017)

Addictive Nature (foaled 2014 at Little Avondale Stud) is an Australian Thoroughbred racehorse, sired by Savabeel from the mare Generous Nature.

== Background ==
Ultra Thoroughbred Racing purchased Addictive Nature for a record $775,000 NZ at the New Zealand Bloodstock Ready to Run sale in 2016. At the time, the purchase price was a record equaling sale for his sire Savabeel, with Sean Buckley and Ultra Thoroughbred Racing’s bloodstock veterinarian Dr. Toby Koenig making the winning bid of $775,000 NZD for the colt following a heated contest.

Addictive Nature is a full brother to Savvy Nature, who recently returned from a successful career in Hong Kong to the stable of Gai Waterhouse and Adrian Bott at Randwick.

Savvy Nature has managed to win five races during his career, with his most significant win to date in the Mitchelton Wines Vase at Moonee Valley (2040m Group 2) on 26 October 2013, taking home the $235,000 for first place.

== Racing History ==
He won his debut race which was the Pluck at Vinery Handicap (1100m) at Warwick Farm Racecourse on 19 July 2017, taking prize money of $22,000.

He won at 1:03.66, breaking the previous class record held by multiple Group I-winner Eremein by 0.17 seconds.

== Pedigree ==
Pedigree of Addictive Nature
Sire Savabeel	Zabeel	Sir Tristram	Sir Ivor
Sire Savabeel	Zabeel	Sir Tristram	Isolt
Sire Savabeel	Zabeel	Lady Giselle	Nureyev
Sire Savabeel	Zabeel	Lady Giselle	Valederna
Sire Savabeel	Savannah Success	Success Express	Hold Your Peace
Sire Savabeel	Savannah Success	Success Express	Au Printemps
Sire Savabeel	Savannah Success	Alma Mater	Semipalatinsk
Sire Savabeel	Savannah Success	Alma Mater	Sweetie
Dam Generous Nature	Carnegie	Sadler's Wells	Northern Dancer
Dam Generous Nature	Carnegie	Sadler's Wells	Fairy Bridge
Dam Generous Nature	Carnegie	Detroit	Riverman
Dam Generous Nature	Carnegie	Detroit	Derna
Dam Generous Nature	La Lagune	Danehill	Danzig
Dam Generous Nature	La Lagune	Danehill	Razyana
Dam Generous Nature	La Lagune	Commercial Choice	Knights Choice
Dam Generous Nature	La Lagune	Commercial Choice	Commercial Venture
