= Peter Maniatis =

Australian television host

- Born: February 1973 (age 52–53); Melbourne, Australia

Peter Maniatis, born February 1973, is an Australian TV host and boxing promoter. Maniatis was recently inducted in the Australian Boxing Hall of Fame and Amateur Boxing Champion.

His father Willam is a Greek-born Australian and his mother Lillian was born in Perth, Western Australia.

== Media Career ==
Maniatis was lured to the TRUTH newspaper in 1995 and worked as a sports journalist for over 25 years. In that time, he won the Victorian Multimedia award a record eight years in a row, from 1998 to 2005.

Maniatis also co-hosts a boxing show on radio SEN 1116 AM Radio Ringside with Mark Fine on Monday nights.

In 2002, Maniatis created the KO Boxing Show, which has broadcast over 700 TV episodes on C31 Melbourne and is also available on Youtube. The Boxing Show is still going strong.

Maniatis Boxing Events air on Solar Sports Asia and Foxtel.

== Career as Boxing Promoter ==
Maniatis started promoting boxing events in 1997 and had a contract with Sky Channel Fox Sports television to promote his boxing events nationally in Australia. He linked up with all the best trainers and managers in Australia, including Jeff Fenech, to put Australia's finest boxers on his promotion fight cards including WBA World Champion Light Flyweight Randy Petalcorin.

Maniatis promoted the comeback Fight of Danny Green at Hisense Arena Melbourne on 19 August 2015

Maniatis has traveled all over the world with boxing and maintains a base in Los Angeles, California, United States where he trained at the Gym of Hall of Fame Trainer Freddy Roach the Wild Card Gymnasium in West Hollywood.

Maniatis works with boxing sponsor Sean Buckley and Ultra Tune to promote boxing fights in Melbourne, Australia. Past events include boxers Randy Petalcorin and Danny Green.

Maniatis Promoted Danny Green vs Roberto Bolonti at the Hisense Arena in Melbourne on 3 August 2016.

== Awards ==
- Australia Boxing Hall of Fame Inductee 2017
- Australian Fight Promoter of the Year 2006
- 2 X MVP Victorian Boxing Person : 2007, 2009
- 4 X WBC ABCO Asia Promoter of the Year : 2012, 2013. 2018, 2022,
- 5 X Victorian Boxing Promoter of The Year : 2005, 2006, 2007, 2008, 2009,
- WBC Australasia Outstanding Promoter 5 Year Award 2020 to 2025
