= Newcastle Gold Cup =

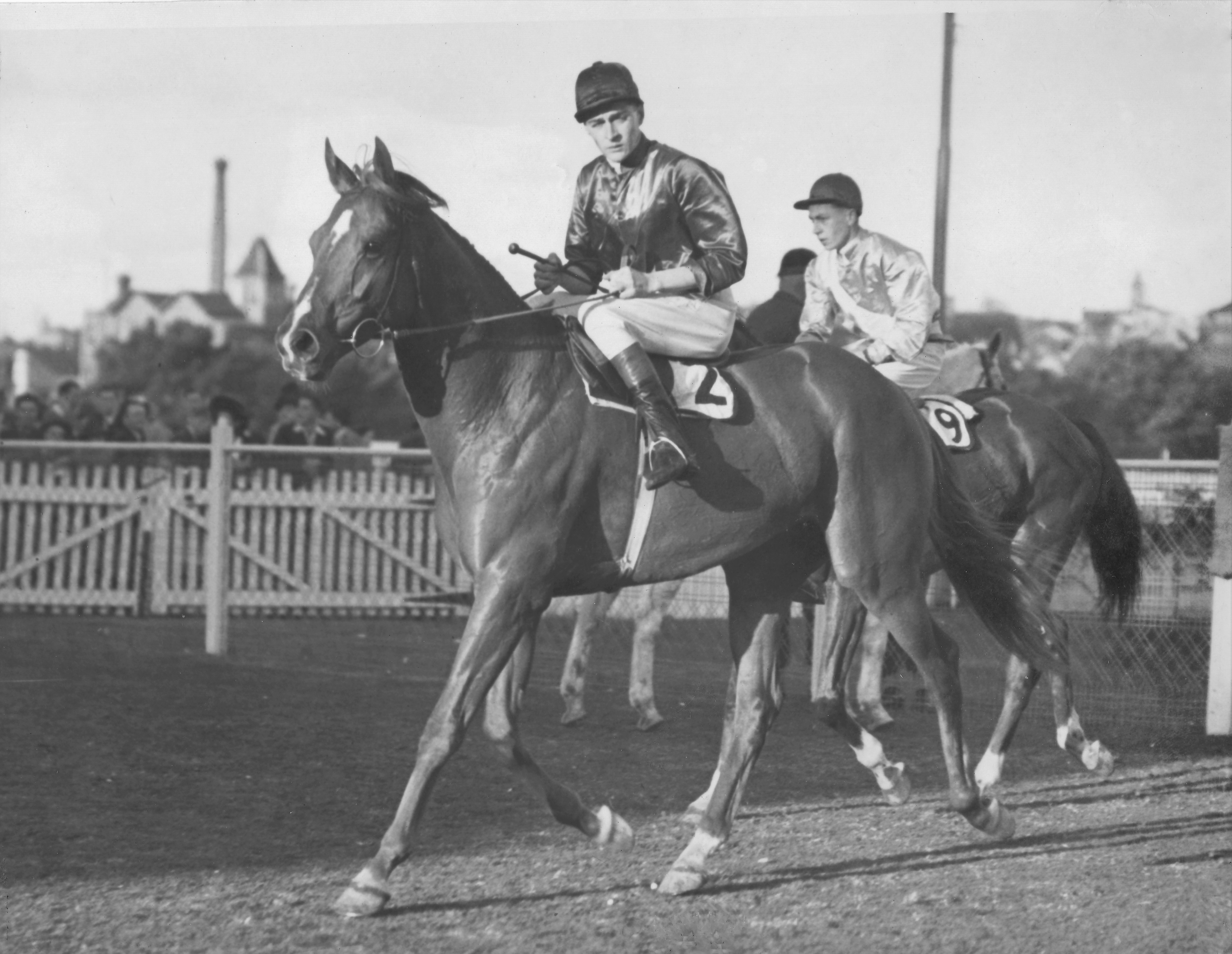
- Russia, 1944 winner
- Class: Group 3
- Location: Newcastle Racecourse, Newcastle, New South Wales, Australia
- Inaugurated: 1898
- Race type: Thoroughbred - flat
- Sponsor: Sharp Office (2018-26)

Race information
- Distance: 2,300 metres
- Surface: Turf
- Track: Right-handed
- Qualification: open
- Weight: open handicap
- Purse: A$300,000 (2026)
- Bonuses: Winner exemption from a ballot on The Metropolitan

The Newcastle Gold Cup is a Newcastle Jockey Club Group 3 Australian Thoroughbred open handicap horse race over a distance of 2300 metres, held at Broadmeadow Racecourse in Newcastle, New South Wales, Australia in September.

== History ==
=== 1947 racebook ===
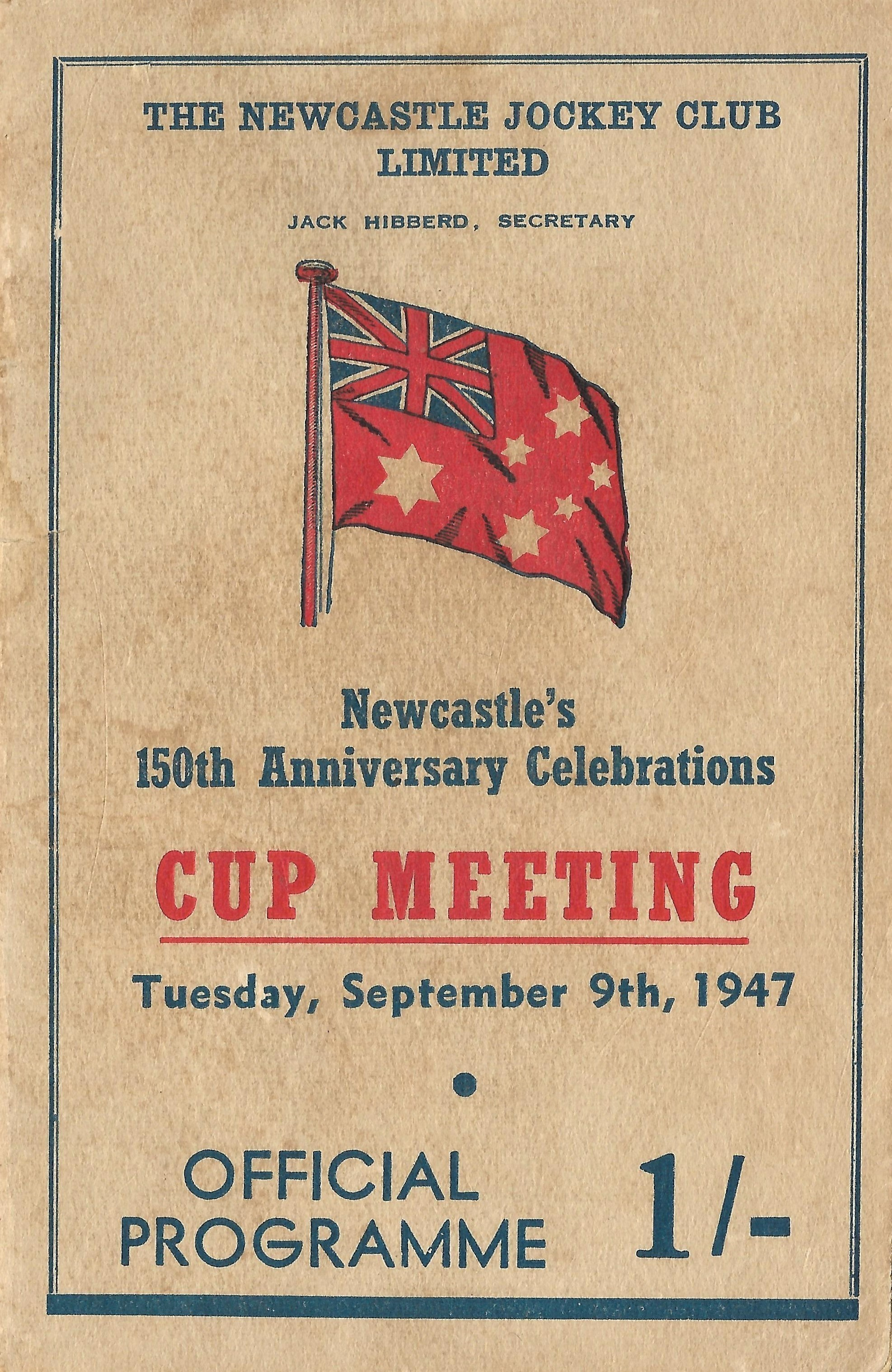
1947 NJC Newcastle Cup racebook front cover

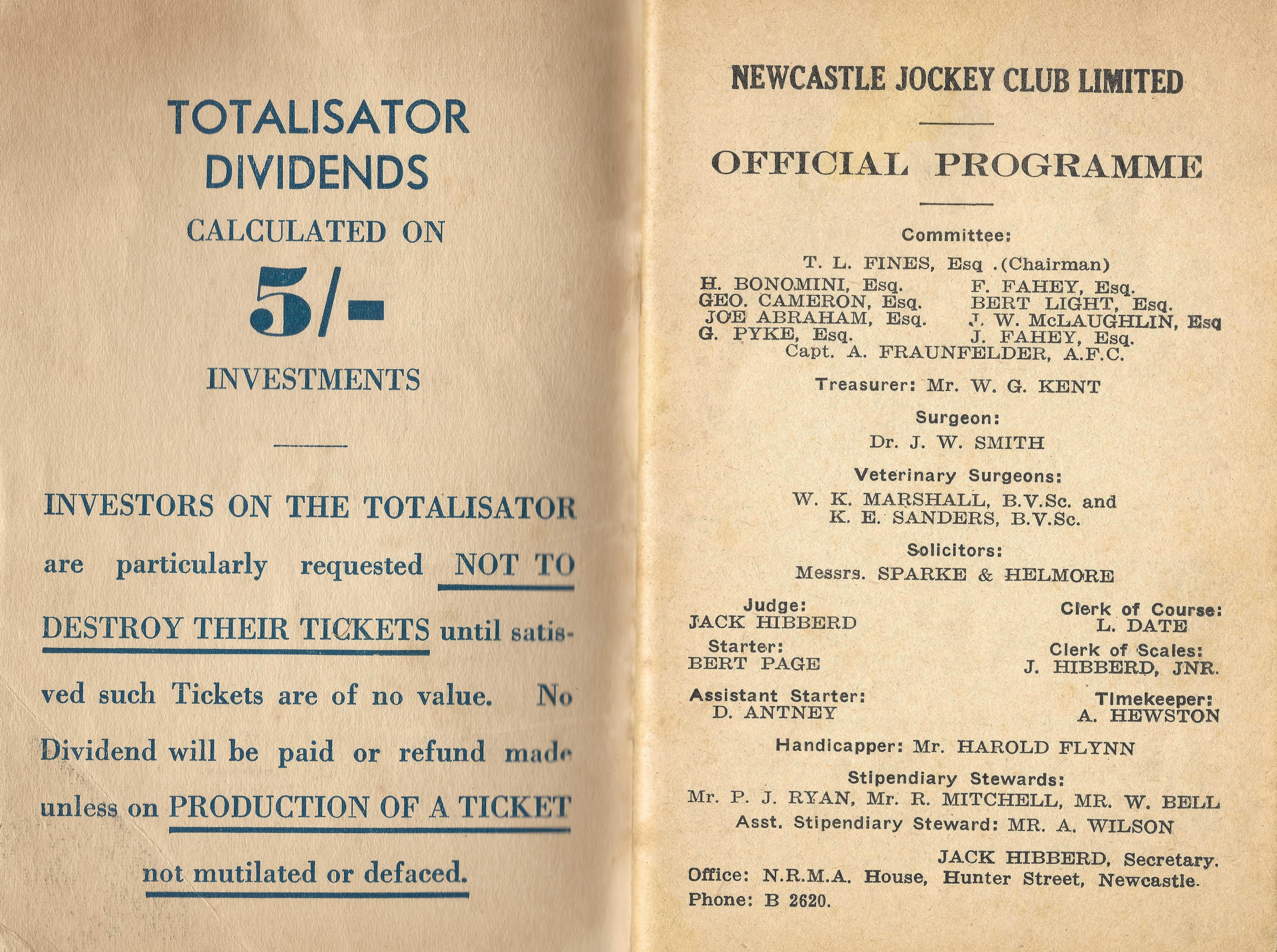
1947 NJC Newcastle Cup raceday officials

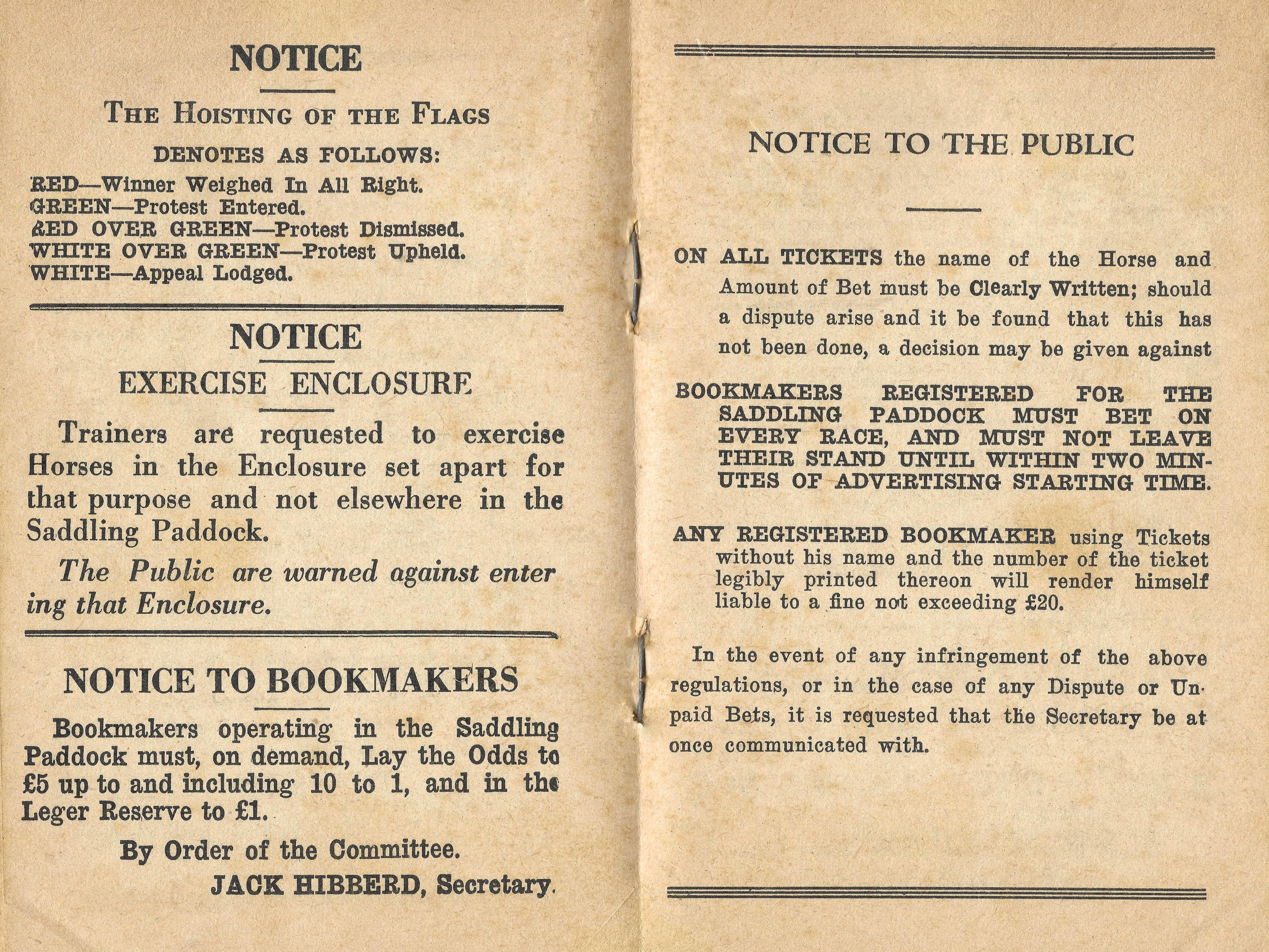
1947 NJC Newcastle Cup general notices to public

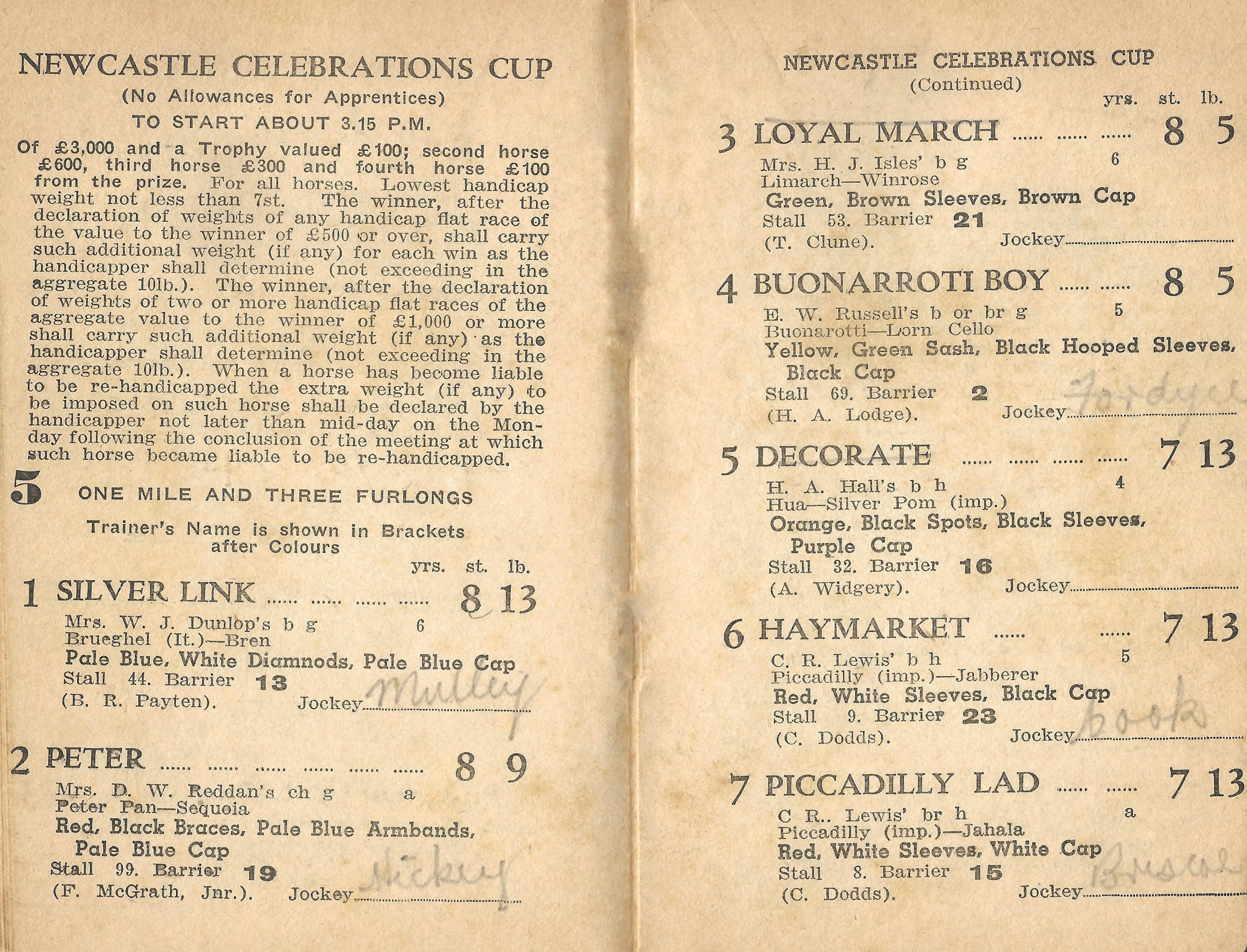
1947 NJC Newcastle Cup showing the winner, Buonarroti Boy

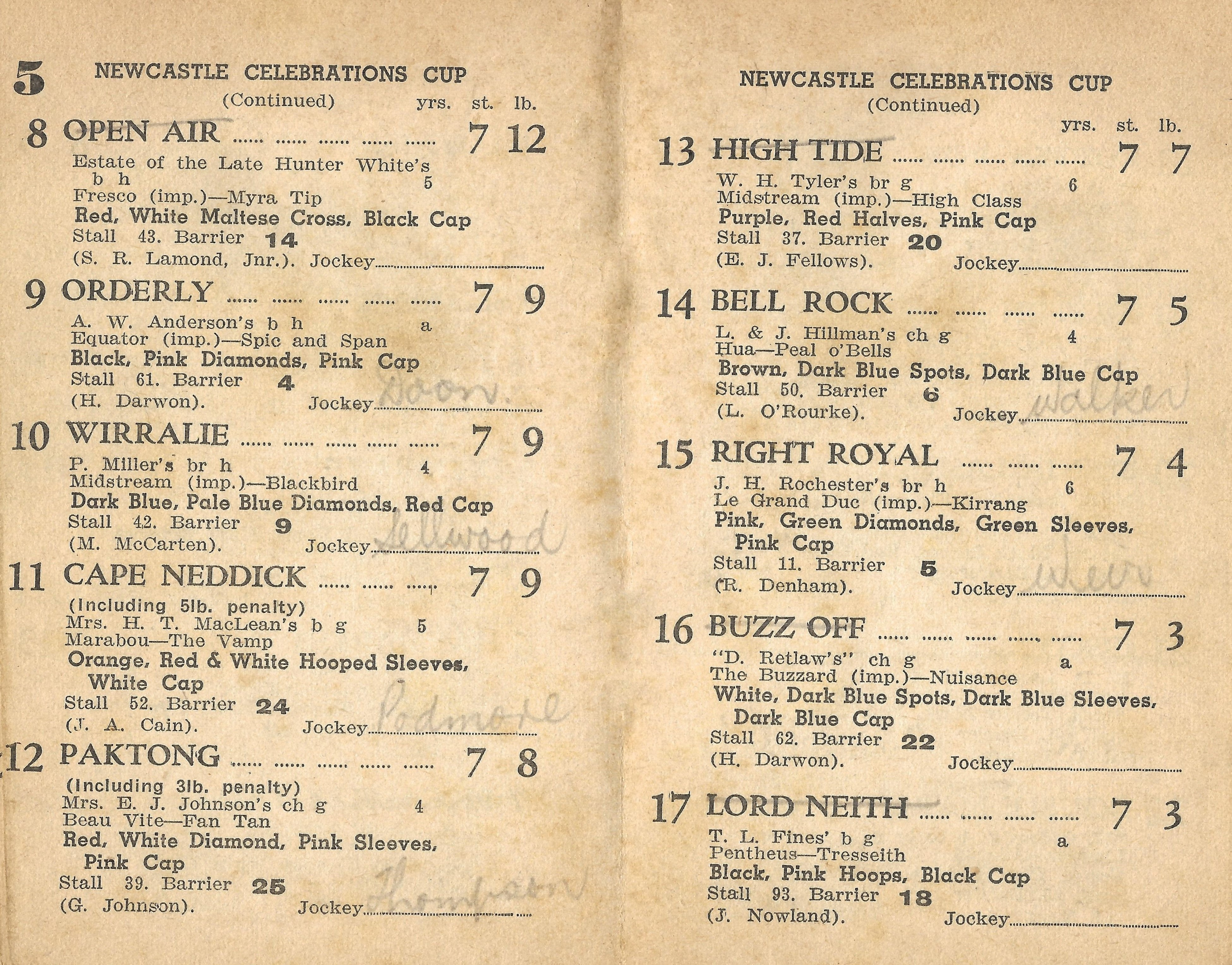
1947 NJC Newcastle Cup starters and results

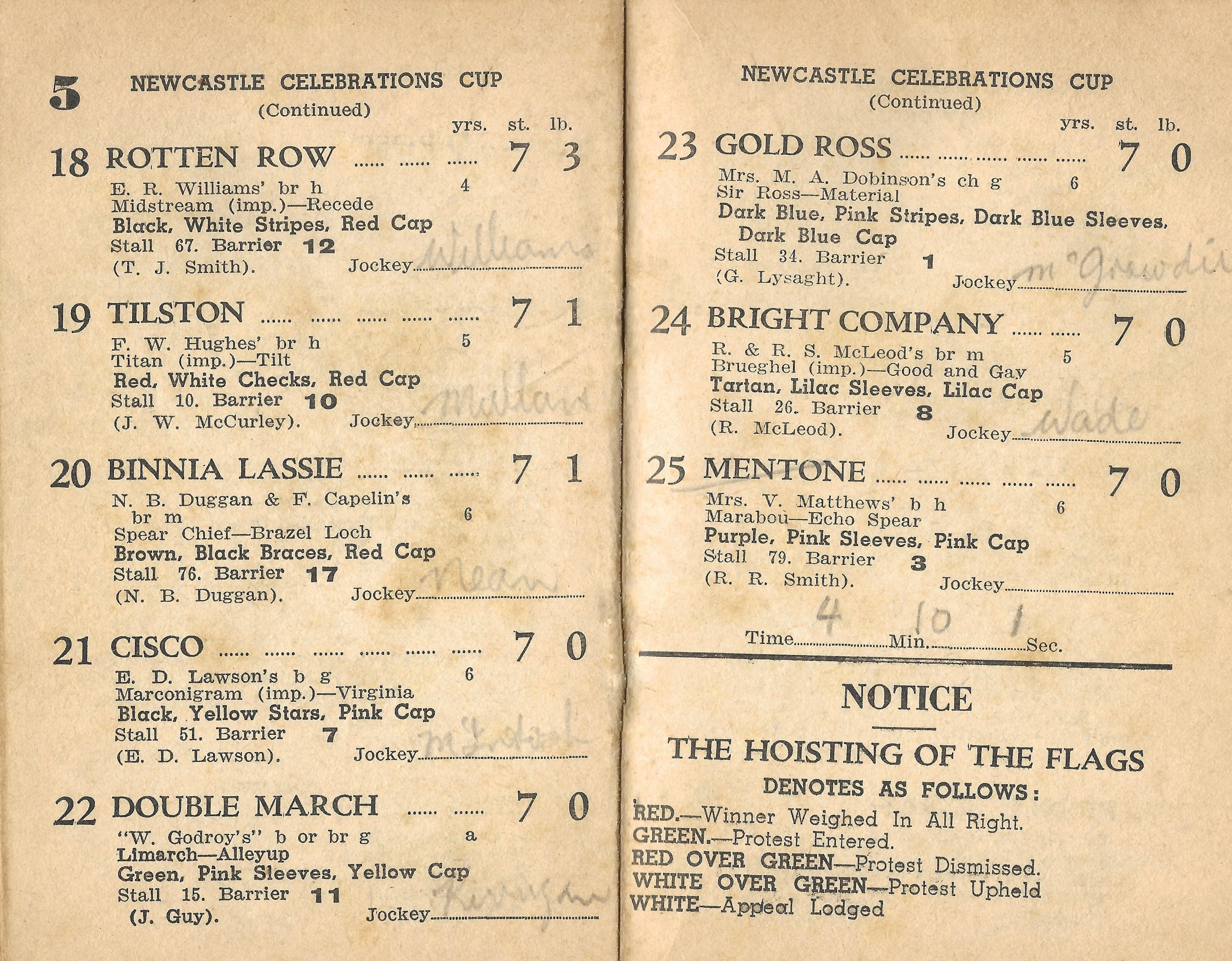
1947 NJC Newcastle Cup starters and results

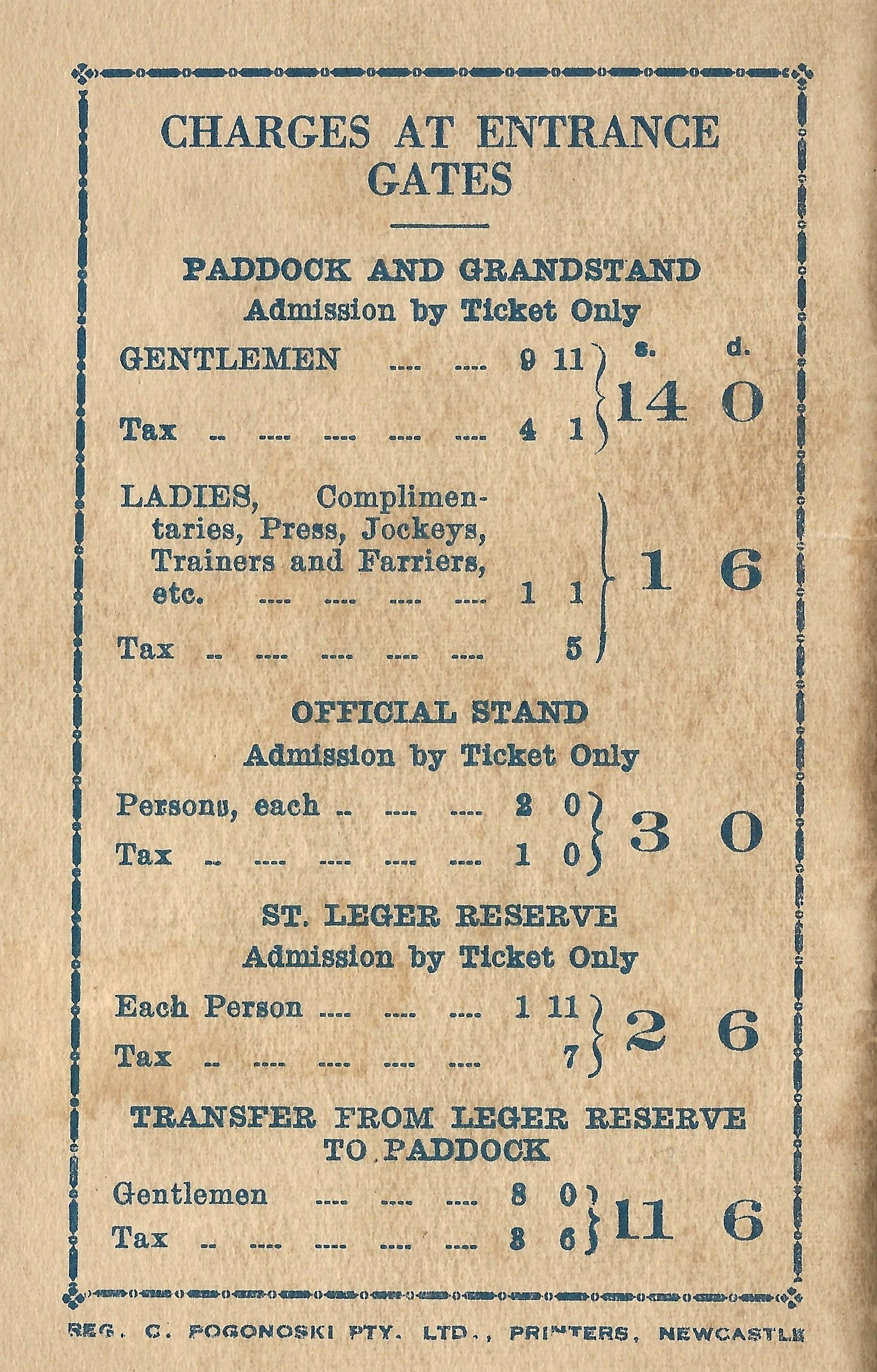
Back cover showing charges at the entrance gates

=== Grade ===
- 1898–1980 - Principal Race
- 1981–1984 - Group 3
- 1985–2001 - Group 2
- 2001 onwards - Group 3

=== Distance ===
- 1898–1906 - 1 3/8 miles
- 1907 - 1 1/4 miles
- 1908–1935 - 1 3/8 miles
- 1936 - 1 1/4 miles
- 1937 - 1 3/8 miles
- 1938 - 1 1/4 miles
- 1939–1943 - 1 3/8 miles
- 1944 - 1 1/4 miles
- 1945–1971 - 1 3/8 miles
- 1972–1977 – 2250 metres
- 1978 – 2300 metres
- 1979–1980 – 2250 metres
- 1981–1991 – 2300 metres
- 1992–2000 – 2400 metres
- 2001–2015 - 2300 metres
- 2016 - 2200 metres
- 2017 onwards - 2300 metres

== Winners ==
The following are past winners of the race.

- 2026 - Aethelwulf
- 2025 - Soul Of Spain
- 2024 - Etna Rosso
- 2023 - Military Mission
- 2022 - Durston
- 2021 - Great House
- 2020 - Mugatoo
- 2019 - Hush Writer
- 2018 - Carzoff
- 2017 - Broadside
- 2016 - Sacred Master
- 2015 – Beyond Thankful
- 2014 – Disclaimer
- 2013 – Winning Glory
- 2012 – Glencadam Gold
- 2011 – Green Moon
- 2010 – Stratofortress
- 2009 – Streetfighter
- 2008 – Bianca
- 2007 – race not held
- 2006 – Bikkie Tin Blues
- 2005 – Carael Boy/High Cee
- 2004 – Another Warrior
- 2003 – Comforts
- 2002 – Time Off
- 2001 – Agincourt Express
- 2000 – Silent Impact
- 1999 – Maltese Beauty
- 1998 – Joss Sticks
- 1997 – Emerald Cut
- 1996 – My Kiwi Gold
- 1995 – Seto Bridge
- 1994 – Oompala
- 1993 – Azzaam
- 1992 – Beachside
- 1991 – Maharajah
- 1990 – Our Magic Man
- 1989 – Hunter
- 1988 – Eye Of The Sky
- 1987 – The Brotherhood
- 1986 – Indian Raj
- 1985 – Mr. Mako
- 1984 – Forward Charge
- 1983 – Chiamare
- 1982 – Gurner's Lane
- 1981 – No Peer
- 1980 – Star Dynasty
- 1979 – Iko
- 1978 – Over The Ocean
- 1977 – Hyperno
- 1976 – Mansingh
- 1975 – Pyramul
- 1974 – St. Martin
- 1973 – Daneson
- 1972 – Glimpse-O-Gold
- 1971 – Chancellor
- 1970 – Abbe D'Or
- 1969 – Maigret
- 1968 – Broadway Boy
- 1967 – Aveniam
- 1966 – Duo
- 1965 – Duo
- 1964 – Brunswick
- 1963 – Royal Rake
- 1962 – Tamure
- 1961 – Rock Mal
- 1960 – North Row
- 1959 – Foxmara
- 1958 – Flash Gem
- 1957 – Gallant Lee
- 1956 – Dewaroy
- 1955 – Triatic
- 1954 – Sir Pilot
- 1953 – Gallant Archer
- 1952 – Benvolo
- 1951 – Ben Hero
- 1950 – Conductor
- 1949 – Wearie
- 1948 – Black Pearl
- 1947 – Buonarroti Boy
- 1946 – Bon Terre
- 1945 – Turn Again
- 1944 – Russia
- 1943 – Precise
- 1942 – Goose Boy
- 1941 – Lord Valentine
- 1940 – Buzalong
- 1939 – Salazar
- 1938 – King Gee
- 1937 – Mestoravon
- 1936 – Tapestry
- 1935 – Milantheon
- 1934 – Broccoli
- 1933 – Sassanides
- 1932 – Circus Star
- 1931 – Strength
- 1930 – Vertoy
- 1929 – Honan
- 1928 – Dion
- 1927 – Horton Gag
- 1926 – Donald
- 1925 – Kiga
- 1924 – Hosier
- 1923 – Pennybont
- 1922 – Lord Zell
- 1921 – Sandbee
- 1920 – Red Cardinal
- 1919 – Mount Alf
- 1918 – Silent Way
- 1917 – Norbury
- 1916 – Duke Alwyne
- 1915 – Duke Alwyne
- 1914 – Sir Alwynton
- 1913 – Sir Vive
- 1912 – Psyttyx
- 1911 – Strathroyal
- 1910 – Lady Wilde
- 1909 – Rocklight
- 1908 – Goldlock
- 1907 – Anatroff
- 1906 – Gladsome
- 1905 – Zythos
- 1904 – Strabo
- 1903 – Oblivion
- 1902 – Burraneer
- 1901 – Salute
- 1900 – America
- 1899 – The Prize
- 1898 – Raven's Plume

== See also ==
- Cameron Handicap
- Newcastle Stakes
- Tibbie Stakes
- List of Australian Group races
- Group races
