= Ma Yiming (boxer) =

Chinese boxer

Personal information
- Nationality: Chinese
- Born: December 19, 1980 (age 45) Dalian, China
- Height: 5 ft 4 in (162 cm)
- Weight: Light Flyweight

Boxing career
- Stance: Southpaw

Boxing record
- Total fights: 20
- Wins: 13
- Win by KO: 7
- Losses: 7
- Draws: 0
- No contests: 0

Ma Yiming (Chinese: 马一鸣; pinyin: Mǎ Yīmíng; born December 19, 1980) is a Chinese professional boxer and the former WBO China Zone flyweight and WBO Asia Pacific light flyweight champion.

== Professional career ==
Ma debuted at the age of 26 in 2007 and lost five out of the first eight fights of his career. He won the vacant WBO China Zone flyweight title in his seventh fight. He would vacate and win this title again in 2010 against Mating Kilakil at the beginning of his winning streak, defending it a further three times.

In his ninth straight victory in 2014 against veteran Tommy Seran, Ma won the vacant WBO Asia Pacific light flyweight championship via a wide unanimous decision, closing his winning streak.

On April 24, 2015 Ma unsuccessfully challenged WBA light flyweight interim champion Randy Petalcorin, suffering three knockdowns en route to a first round technical knockout loss, ending his winning streak.

== Professional boxing record ==
20 fights	13 wins	7 losses
By knockout	7	6
By decision	6	1

No.	Result	Record	Opponent	Type	Round, time	Date	Location	Notes
20	Loss	13–7	Ronnie Baldonado	TKO	1 (10), 1:42	27 Apr 2017	National Olympic Sports Center Gym, Beijing, China	
19	Win	13–6	Jayar Diama	SD	6	30 Jan 2016	Shanghai Oriental Sports Center, Shanghai, China	
18	Loss	12–6	Randy Petalcorin	TKO	1 (12)	24 Apr 2015	Capital Gym, Beijing	For WBA interim light-flyweight title
17	Win	12–5	Tommy Seran	UD	10	16 Dec 2014	Mercedes-Benz Arena, Shanghai, China	Won vacant WBO Asia Pacific light-flyweight title
16	Win	11–5	Pakpoom Hammarach	KO	3 (4)	26 Aug 2014	Mercedes-Benz Arena, Shanghai, China	
15	Win	10–5	Jeon Jin-man	KO	3 (6), 0:10	1 Nov 2013	Interbulgo Hotel, Wonju, South Korea	
14	Win	9–5	Albert Alcoy	TKO	5 (12), 2:46	22 Dec 2012	Haikou, Hainan, China	Won inaugural IPBU Oriental flyweight title
13	Win	8–5	Takaaki Kitagawa	KO	8 (12)	21 Apr 2012	Marriott Hotel, Beijing, China	Retained WBO China Zone flyweight title
12	Win	7–5	Suthep Sor Por Lor Krungthep	UD	12	19 Nov 2011	People's Stadium, Tianjin, China	Retained WBO China Zone flyweight title
11	Win	6–5	Ricky Manufoe	UD	12	2 Oct 2011	Tianjin, China	Retained WBO China Zone flyweight title
10	Win	5–5	Takaaki Kitagawa	KO	1 (8)	17 Sep 2011	Haihe Education Center Stadium, Tianjin, China	
9	Win	4–5	Mating Kilakil	SD	12	5 Dec 2010	Gegu Arena, Tianjin, China	Won vacant WBO China Zone flyweight title
8	Loss	3–5	Jonathan Baat	TKO	1 (8), 1:02	29 Aug 2010	Sangyo Hall, Kanazawa, Japan	
7	Win	3–4	Wang Xinghua	TKO	9 (12)	28 Nov 2009	Linyi, Shandong, China	Won vacant WBO China Zone flyweight title
6	Win	2–4	Wang Xinghua	UD	6	11 Sep 2009	Harbin, Heilongjiang, China	
5	Loss	1–4	Jorge Abiague	UD	4	19 Jun 2009	Laredo Entertainment Center, Laredo, Texas, U.S.	
4	Win	1–3	In Yong-suk	KO	6 (6), 0:47	20 Sep 2008	Seoya High School, Habdeok, South Korea	
3	Loss	0–3	Saengpetch Sor Sakulphan	KO	1 (6)	30 Apr 2007	Surat Thani, Surat Thani Province, Thailand	
2	Loss	0–2	Wanheng Menayothin	TKO	1 (10), 2:21	30 Mar 2007	Mathayom Wat Sing School, Samut Prakan, Thailand	For vacant WBC Youth mini-flyweight title
1	Loss	0–1	Kim Jung-wan	KO	2 (8), 2:14	1 Mar 2007	Imsil-Gun Hall, Hanam, South Korea	

== See also ==
- Boxing in China

New title	WBO China Zone Flyweight Champion; November 28, 2009 – December 5, 2010; Vacated	Vacant Title next held by Ma Yiming
Vacant Title last held by Ma Yiming	WBO China Zone Flyweight Champion; December 5, 2010 – ? Vacated	Incumbent
Vacant Title last held by Joebert Alvarez	WBO Asia Pacific Light Flyweight Champion; December 16, 2014 – February 13, 2015; Vacated	Vacant Title next held by Young Kil Bae
