= Ik Yang =

Chinese boxer (born 1985)

Personal information
- Nickname: Wild Man
- Nationality: Chinese
- Born: Yang Lian Hui; March 28, 1985 (age 41) Dalian, China
- Height: 5 ft 7.5 in (172 cm)
- Weight: Light Welterweight

Boxing career
- Stance: Orthodox

Boxing record
- Total fights: 22
- Wins: 19
- Win by KO: 14
- Losses: 2
- No contests: 1

Ik Yang or Yang Lianhui (Chinese: 杨连慧) (born March 28, 1985, Dalian, China) is a Chinese professional light welterweight boxer and a former title challenger. He held the South Korea, WBO China Zone, WBO Asia Pacific lightweight and IBF Pan Pacific light welterweight titles.

== Professional career ==
Yang did not start with a notable amateur pedigree as was the case for many Chinese fighters. He made his professional debut in 2007, winning the South Korea lightweight title in 2012 against journeyman Jon Won Won in his ninth fight. In his following fight with Elly Ray, he won the relatively new WBO China Zone lightweight title via an eighth round technical knockout.

In 2014 he stopped Sukkasem Kietyongyuth in eight rounds to win the WBO Asia Pacific lightweight title. Later that year he moved up to the light welterweight division and stopped Thai veteran Fahsai Sakkreerin to win the IBF Pan Pacific light welterweight title which he would later successfully defend against another Thai veteran, Patomsuk Pathompothong via a sixth round technical knockout in his first twelve round fight.

On July 18, 2015 Yang fought for the vacant IBF light welterweight title against long time veteran César Cuenca, suffering his first professional defeat via unanimous decision in a fight where both fighters suffered knockdowns.

== Professional record ==
19 Wins (14 Knockouts), 2 Defeats, 0 Draws
Res.	Record	Opponent	Type	Rd., Time	Date	Location	Notes
Loss	19-2	(Australia) Leonardo Zappavigna	TKO	6 (12)	2016-07-23	(United States) MGM Grand, Las Vegas	
Loss	19-1	(Argentina) Cesar Cuenca	UD	12	2015-07-18	(Macau) Cotai Arena, Venetian Resort, Macao	For vacant IBF Light welterweight title.
Win	19-0	(Thailand) Patomsuk Pathompothong	TKO	6(12)	2015-03-07	(Macau) Cotai Arena, Venetian Resort, Macao	Retained IBF Pan Pacific Super Lightweight title.
Win	18-0	(Thailand) Fahsai Sakkreerin	RDT	5(10)	2014-12-16	(China) Mercedes-Benz Arena, Shanghai	Won IBF Pan Pacific Super Lightweight title.
Win	17-0	(Thailand) Sukkasem Kietyongyuth	TKO	8(10)	2014-08-26	(China) Mercedes-Benz Arena, Shanghai	Won WBO Asian Pacific Light welterweight title.
Win	16-0	(Thailand) Sayan Sirimongkhon	TKO	3(8)	2014-07-19	(Macau) Cotai Arena, Venetian Resort, Macao	
Win	15-0	(Indonesia) Geisler AP	TKO	1(8)	2014-05-31	(Macau) Cotai Arena, Venetian Resort, Macao	
Win	14-0	(Indonesia) Hero Tito	MD	6(6)	2013-11-24	(Macau) Cotai Arena, Venetian Resort, Macao	

== See also ==
- Boxing in China

Vacant Title last held by Ji-Hoon Kim	South Korea Lightweight Champion; May 4, 2012 – April 6, 2014; Vacated	Vacant Title next held by Sa Ya Lee
Preceded by Elly Ray	WBO China Zone Lightweight Champion; June 28, 2012 – ? Vacated	Incumbent
Vacant Title last held by Roy Mukhlis	WBO Asia Pacific Lightweight Champion; August 26, 2014 – September 13, 2014; Vacated	Vacant Title next held by Josh King
Vacant Title last held by Patomsuk Pathompothong	IBF Pan Pacific Light Welterweight Champion; December 16, 2014 – current	Incumbent
