= Lookrak Kiatmungmee =

Thai boxer

Personal information
- Nationality: Thai
- Born: Thailand
- Weight: Mini-flyweight; Light-flyweight

Boxing career
- Stance: Orthodox

Boxing record
- Total fights: 14
- Wins: 7
- Win by KO: 4
- Losses: 7

Lookrak Kiatmungmee is a Thai former professional boxer who competed from 2005 to 2014 and challenged for the WBC strawweight title in 2013.

== Professional career ==
Kiatmungee lost to Liempetch Sor Veerapol on July 23, 2010 via knockout only three seconds into the first round.

Almost two years after losing to Omari Kimweri on December 2, 2011 by unanimous decision, Kiatmungmee challenged for his first world title on November 30, 2013 against WBC mini-flyweight champion Xiong Zhao Zhong. However, he would end up losing by fifth-round knockout.

== Professional boxing record ==
14 fights	7 wins	7 losses
By knockout	4	6
By decision	3	1

No.	Result	Record	Opponent	Type	Round, time	Date	Location	Notes
14	Loss	7–7	(Thailand) Manot Comput	KO	1 (6)	7 Mar 2014	Thai Wasadu store, Bangkok, Thailand	
13	Loss	7–6	(China) Xiong Chaozhong	KO	5 (12), 1:59	30 Nov 2013	Maguan, China	For WBC strawweight title
12	Loss	7–5	(Tanzania) Omari Kimweri	UD	8	2 Dec 2011	Roller Skating Centre, Sunshine, Australia	
11	Loss	7–4	(Philippines) Eduard Penerio	KO	1 (10), 1:25	2 Oct 2011	Tianjin, China	For vacant WBO Youth junior-flyweight title
10	Loss	7–3	(Thailand) Samartlek Kokietgym	KO	2 (6)	17 Jun 2011	Krirk University, Bangkok, Thailand	
9	Win	7–2	(Thailand) Meechai Kiatpracha	TKO	3 (6), 0:49	26 Nov 2010	Bangna, Bangkok, Thailand	
8	Loss	6–2	(Thailand) Liempetch Sor Veerapol	KO	1 (6), 0:03	23 Jul 2010	Maejo University, Chiang Mai, Thailand	
7	Loss	6–1	(Thailand) Noknoi Sitthiprasert	KO	2 (6)	31 Jul 2009	Saraburi, Thailand	
6	Win	6–0	(Thailand) Petch Windygym	PTS	6	25 Feb 2009	Park, Ayutthaya, Thailand	
5	Win	5–0	(Philippines) Philip Parcon	UD	12	18 Mar 2006	Omnoi Stadium, Samut Sakhon, Thailand	Retained WBC–ABCO strawweight title
4	Win	4–0	(Thailand) Ngaoprajan Chuwatana	TKO	6 (12), 1:29	11 Nov 2005	Bangkok, Thailand	Won vacant WBC–ABCO interim strawweight title
3	Win	3–0	(Thailand) Suo Or Maleetitak	KO	1 (6)	31 Aug 2005	Imperial World Store, Bangkok, Thailand	
2	Win	2–0	(Thailand) Povaris Sathirayeonyong	PTS	6	10 Jun 2005	Imperial World Store, Bangkok, Thailand	
1	Win	1–0	(Thailand) Petch Sithbandon	KO	4	18 Feb 2005	Imperial World Store, Bangkok, Thailand	

Sporting positions
Regional boxing titles
New title	WBC–ABCO mini-flyweight champion Interim title 11 Nov 2005 – Jan 2006; Promoted	Vacant Title next held by Pornsawan Porpramook
Vacant Title last held by Kittipong Jaikajang	WBC–ABCO mini-flyweight champion Jan 2006 – Oct 2006; Vacated	Vacant Title next held by Vicha Phulaikaw
