= Broadmeadow Racecourse =

Horse racing venue in Newcastle, New South Wales

- Location: Broadmeadow, New South Wales
- Coordinates: 32°55′46″S 151°44′28″E
- Owned by: Newcastle Jockey Club
- Date opened: 27 April 1907
- Notable races: Cameron Handicap; Newcastle Gold Cup; Newcastle Newmarket Handicap; Spring Stakes; Tibbie Stakes

Broadmeadow Racecourse is an Australian racecourse for horse racing in the Newcastle suburb of Broadmeadow. It was opened on 27th of April, 1907 by the Newcastle Jockey Club on land acquired from the Australian Agricultural Company. It replaced a racecourse at Hamilton.

Notable races held at Broadmeadow are the Cameron Handicap, Newcastle Gold Cup, Newcastle Newmarket Handicap, Spring Stakes and Tibbie Stakes.
