= Sean Buckley (entrepreneur) =

Australian businessman

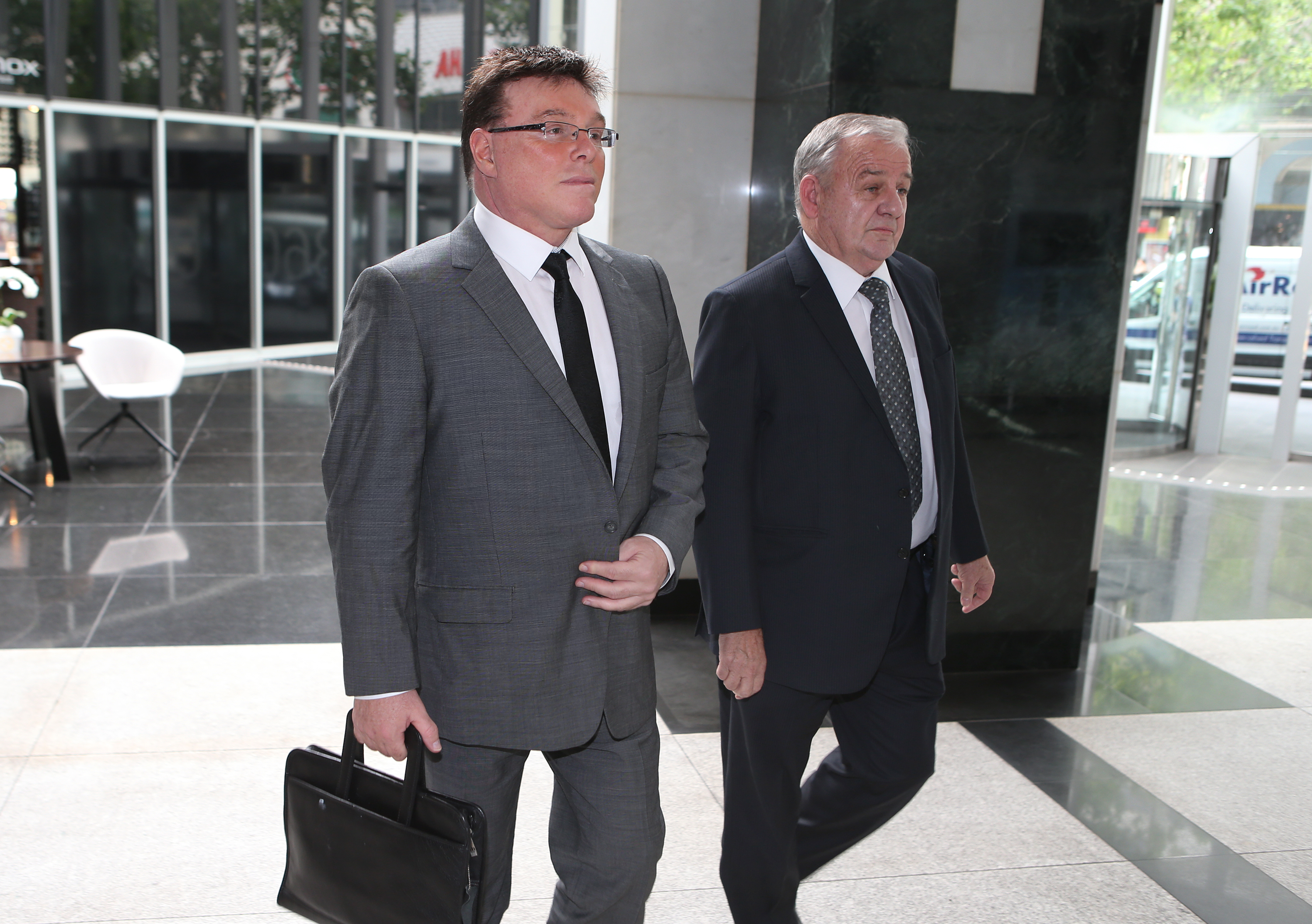
- Sean Buckley and Hamish Murdoch attending the ACCC Enquiry, December 2016
- Occupation: Business executive
- Years active: 1994–present
- Children: 3

Sean Buckley is an Australian entrepreneur and thoroughbred racehorse owner and investor. He is executive chairman of Ultra Tune. He is Executive Chairman of Ultra Tune Australia and the Ultra Group of Companies.

== Early life ==
Buckley was raised in the Eastern suburbs of Victoria, Australia, the first born of son of Peter Buckley and Gloria Buckley and he had a younger brother Clayton. Buckley attended Mazenod College in Mulgrave where he completed his Higher School Certificate. He then attended Chisholm Institute completing a Bachelor of Business and Marketing graduating in 1984.

Buckley was appointed Market Research Manager for Safeway/Woolworths working on new store development and new product ranges. In 1988 he travelled to Hong Kong to work with Thomas Cook, up offices in India and Pakistan. He returned to Australia and commenced work with Ultra Tune in 1994.

== Ultra Tune ==
Buckley is executive chairman of the Ultra Group of Companies and Ultra Tune. He has been the impetus behind the often criticised but highly successful advertising campaigns.

Buckley appeared on behalf of Ultra Tune and other independent after sales service providers in December 2016 at the Australian Competition & Consumer Commission and Australian Automotive Aftermarket Association enquiry into the monopoly that new car manufacturers were attempting to sustain on after sales servicing.

== Thoroughbred racing ==
Buckley is owner at Ultra Thoroughbred Racing, a primary and pre-training stud.

At the Spring Thoroughbred Sale for Magic Millions in October 2014, Buckley purchased thoroughbred horse Hooked for $600,000 on behalf of Ultra Thoroughbred Racing. At the Karaka 2016 Premier Sale at Little Avondale Stud, Buckley and Ultra Thoroughbred Racing purchased a colt from unraced mare Generous Nature and is a full-brother to the multiple stakes performer Savvy Nature for $775,000.

== Boxing ==
Buckley is involved in supporting boxing and Ultra Tune currently sponsors Randy Petalcorin. Buckley received an award from the World Boxing Federation (WBF) for Outstanding Services to Boxing in 2014. Buckley sponsored welterweight boxer Parnia Porsche who won the Women's WBF Australasian Super Welterweight Title in November 2016.

== Legal proceedings ==
In 2009, Buckley instigated legal proceedings for defamation (Buckley v Herald & Weekly Times) against Russell Robertson and the Herald Sun newspaper, seeking damages in the Melbourne Supreme Court over two articles which appeared in News Corp Australia newspapers in 2007 and 2008. The Herald Sun settled the matter out of court for an undisclosed amount and published an apology. The Victorian Court of Appeal decided that the plaintiff was entitled to issue separate proceedings over separate publications and was thus entitled to the potential benefit of two statutory caps on compensatory damages.

=== Sean Buckley vs. Police Informant ===
Since 2020 Buckley has been subject to legal proceedings initiated by Jennifer Cole, who falsely accused him of stalking and assault. On the 7 August 2025 at Melbourne Magistrates Court, the police prosecutor, in front of Magistrate Malcolm Thomas withdrew all charges, and Buckley's solicitor Martin Amad stated "It reflects what he has said to his lawyers for the last five years that he is an innocent man. Of course it's a relief, and he thanks the justice system for obviously coming through with this decision."
