= Omari Kimweri =

Tanzanian-Australian boxer

Personal information
- Nickname: Tiny Cub
- Nationality: Australian
- Born: 22 September 1982 (age 44) Tanga, Tanzania
- Height: 5 ft 3 in (160 cm)
- Weight: Mini-flyweight; Light-flyweight; Flyweight

Boxing career
- Stance: Orthodox

Boxing record
- Total fights: 22
- Wins: 17
- Win by KO: 7
- Losses: 5

Omari Idd Kimweri (born 22 September 1982) is a Tanzanian-Australian professional boxer who challenged for the WBC strawweight title in 2017. As an amateur he represented Tanzania in the 2006 Commonwealth Games, after which he defected to Australia.

== Professional career ==
Kimweri has most commonly fought at light-flyweight and flyweight, fighting for and winning several regional titles. He defeated Randy Petalcorin in a controversial split decision to win the WBC Silver flyweight title in April 2016, earning a WBC world title opportunity. He opted to drop weight class to strawweight and challenged WBC champion Wanheng Menayothin in June 2017, but lost by unanimous decision.

== Professional boxing record ==
22 fights	17 wins	5 losses
By knockout	7	1
By decision	10	4

No.	Result	Record	Opponent	Type	Round, time	Date	Location	Notes
22	Loss	17–5	Tibo Monabesa	UD	12	7 Jul 2019	Flobamora Sports Hall, Kupang, Indonesia	For vacant IBO light-flyweight title
21	Win	17–4	Suphakit Khampha	TKO	1 (6), 2:42	14 Dec 2018	The Melbourne Pavilion, Flemington, Australia	
20	Loss	16–4	Wanheng Menayothin	UD	12	3 Jun 2017	Provincial Stadium, Rayong, Thailand	For WBC strawweight title
19	Win	16–3	Randy Petalcorin	SD	12	15 Apr 2016	The Melbourne Pavilion, Flemington, Australia	Won vacant WBC Silver flyweight title
18	Win	15–3	Michael Camelion	UD	10	26 Feb 2016	The Melbourne Pavilion, Flemington, Australia	Won vacant WBA Pan African light-flyweight title
17	Win	14–3	Pakpoom Hammarach	KO	2 (4), 1:34	5 Jun 2015	The Melbourne Pavilion, Flemington, Australia	
16	Win	13–3	Unknown	TKO	1 (4), 2:41	25 Jul 2013	The Melbourne Pavilion, Flemington, Australia	
15	Loss	12–3	Shin Ono	SD	12	12 Jan 2013	Korakuen Hall, Tokyo, Japan	For vacant OPBF light-flyweight title
14	Win	12–2	Yodpichai Sithsaithong	UD	6	13 Jul 2012	The Melbourne Pavilion, Flemington, Australia	
13	Win	11–2	Lookrak Kiatmungmee	UD	8	2 Dec 2011	Roller Skating Centre, Sunshine, Australia	
12	Win	10–2	Junior Bajawa	UD	4	5 Aug 2011	The Melbourne Pavilion, Flemington, Australia	
11	Win	9–2	Panmongkol Ekarin	TKO	2 (12), 0:47	8 Apr 2011	The Melbourne Pavilion, Flemington, Australia	Won vacant WBO Oriental light-flyweight title
10	Win	8–2	Jack Amisa	UD	6	27 Nov 2010	The Melbourne Pavilion, Flemington, Australia	
9	Win	7–2	Ricky Manufoe	SD	6	20 Aug 2010	Racecourse Atrium Room, Flemington, Australia	
8	Win	6–2	Matt Meredith	TKO	1 (10), 0:51	27 Feb 2010	Racecourse, Cranbourne, Australia	Won vacant Australian flyweight title
7	Win	5–2	Thanupetch Singmanasak	UD	6	22 May 2009	Knox Netball Centre, Ferntree Gully, Australia	
6	Win	4–2	Chiya Sithkrupon	KO	2 (4), 1:48	20 Mar 2009	Knox Netball Centre, Ferntree Gully, Australia	
5	Win	3–2	Roberto Lerio	SD	8	1 Nov 2008	Recreation Centre, Gawler, Australia	
4	Loss	2–2	Angky Angkotta	UD	12	24 Jun 2008	Hisense Arena, Melbourne, Australia	For vacant IBF Pan Pacific flyweight title
3	Win	2–1	Shane Brock	KO	6 (6), 1:36	28 Mar 2008	Shed 14 Central Pier Peninsula, Melbourne, Australia	
2	Loss	1–1	Ernie Gonzales Jr.	TKO	1 (6), 2:16	30 Nov 2007	Sweeney's at Scenic Hills, Ingleburn, Australia	
1	Win	1–0	Emanuel Micallef	UD	4	20 Jul 2007	Playford Civic Centre, Elizabeth, Australia	

Sporting positions
Regional boxing titles
Vacant Title last held by Shane Brock	Australian flyweight champion 27 Feb 2010 – Jul 2010; Vacated	Title discontinued
Vacant Title last held by Edrin Dapudong	WBO Oriental light-flyweight champion 8 Apr 2011 – Mar 2012; Vacated	Vacant Title next held by Vergilio Silvano
Vacant Title last held by Bert Batawang	WBA Pan African light-flyweight champion 26 Feb 2016 – Mar 2016; Vacated	Vacant Title next held by Hekkie Budler
Vacant Title last held by Luis Concepción	WBC Silver flyweight champion 15 Apr 2016 – Jun 2016; Vacated	Vacant Title next held by Muhammad Waseem
