= Alex de Jesús =

Puerto Rican boxer (1983–2016)

Personal information
- Nickname: El Pollo
- Nationality: Puerto Rican
- Born: Alexander de Jesús; February 2, 1983 San Juan, Puerto Rico
- Died: April 3, 2016 (aged 33) San Juan, Puerto Rico
- Weight: Light welterweight

Boxing career
- Stance: Southpaw

Boxing record
- Total fights: 23
- Wins: 21
- Win by KO: 13
- Losses: 2
- Draws: 0
- No contests: 0
Medal record
Pan American Games
Silver medal – second place	2003 Santo Domingo	Lightweight
Central American and Caribbean Games
Silver medal – second place	2002 San Salvador	Lightweight

Alexander de Jesús (February 2, 1983 – April 3, 2016) was a Puerto Rican professional boxer. As an amateur, de Jesús represented the island of Puerto Rico in international events, including the 2003 Pan American Games, the 2002 Central American and Caribbean Games and the 2004 Summer Olympics. Early in his career, he won seven regional titles: the World Boxing Organization Latino lightweight title, World Boxing Council Caribbean Boxing Federation lightweight title, World Boxing Association Fedecaribe Lightweight title, WBO Latino light welterweight title, WBA Fedecaribe Welterweight title, WBC Latino light welterweight title and the WBA Fedebol light welterweight title.

== Biography ==
During the 2004 Athens Olympic Games, De Jesús became the first Puerto Rican to win an Olympic boxing fight since Daniel Santos earned a bronze medal at the 1996 Atlanta, Georgia games. De Jesús defeated Brazilian Myke Carvalho by decision during the first round of the competition to achieve that accomplishment. In the second round, however, he lost by one point (23-24), to Sam Rukundo from Uganda.

De Jesús' nickname used to be "El Pollo Whitaker", meaning "Chicken Whitaker". "El Pollo" was given to him by his parents because he was a very small child. "Whitaker" was given to him by his trainers at the boxing gym, because they thought Alexander's style of fighting was reminiscent of the one presented by Pernell Whitaker. He announced just before the Olympics, however, that he was dropping off the "Whitaker" part from his nickname because he wanted to form his own identity as a boxer.

== Professional career ==
Alex de Jesús debuted as a professional in a boxing card that took place in Bayamón, Puerto Rico on January 29, 2005. This fight was against Ruben Mesorrama who was also debuting and it ended on the second round when de Jesús won by knockout. De Jesús' next fight was against Alejandro Alicea on March 4, 2005. This event was held in Hato Rey, Puerto Rico and the contest ended in the third round when de Jesús won by technical knockout. On November 11, 2006, de Jesús competed against Jefferson Auraad Rodriguez, de Jesús was awarded a Referee technical decision in the third round. In this fight de Jesús won three regional titles these were: the WBO Latino Lightweight title, WBC Caribbean Boxing Federation lightweight title and the WBA Fedecaribe lightweight title. Alex returned to action on July 20, 2007, against Arturo Morua, in a fight he won by unanimous decision. In this fight de Jesús won his fourth and fifth regional titles: the WBO Latino welterweight title and the WBA Fedecaribe welterweight title. De Jesús was then active in a fight that would be used as an elimination to determine the first contender for the World Boxing Organization's light welterweight division title against Bulmaro Solis in a contest that he won by knockout in the fourth round. Alex was unable to make the accorded weight prior to this fight which led to Solis' receiving an amount of money that was equivalent to the amount of pounds over the limit. Following this event de Jesús was scheduled to fight Steve Quiñones in a card that took place on December 7, 2007. Prior to the event de Jesús noted that the training for the fight was the most intense in his career, he stated that he wanted to win regional titles in three different weight divisions in order to challenge Ricardo Torres for the WBO light welterweight championship. The fight card was presented by All Star Boxing and it was organized in Miami, Florida. De Jesús defeated Quiñones by unanimous decision and won the vacant WBC Latino light welterweight title. The three judges awarded Alex scores of 116–112, 117-111 and 115–113. On April 5, 2008, de Jesus successfully defended the WBO regional title against Wilfredo Negron. De Jesús displayed more fluid boxing throughout the fight, in the process scoring a knockdown in the third. The contest was stopped in the final round when Negron was unable to recover after one of de Jesus's combinations connected behind his ear. In this fight he won the vacant WBA Fedebol light welterweight title. De Jesús returned to action on August 8, 2008, defeating Adrián Navarrete by technical knockout. As part of a card titled "The First Step" which featured Juan Manuel López's first world championship defense, De Jesús defeated José Antonio Izquierdo by technical knockout. Izquierdo was more active in the offensive during the early rounds, but De Jesús established control of the fight's tempo from the third onwards. After receiving three knockdowns, Izquierdo's corner threw in the towel following the last of these. On March 20, 2009, De Jesús lost for the first time as a professional, losing by unanimous decision to César René Cuenca in a result that was described as "controversial".

== Outside the ring ==
From 2009 to 2013, De Jesus served a four-year prison sentence on domestic violence charges. His charges included violating a protective order against his wife and kids, and he served his time in a Bayamon, Puerto Rico jail.

On April 2, 2016, in San Juan, De Jesús was charged for allegedly attacking his stepmother. She had filed a complaint against him with the local authorities, claiming the boxer attacked her. He was later found shot to death on April 3, 2016. He was 33.

== Titles won ==
WBO Latino light welterweight title ~

WBA Fedecaribe Light Welterweight title ~

WBO Latino lightweight title ~

WBC CABOFE (Caribbean Boxing Federation) lightweight title ~

WBA Fedecaribe Lightweight Title ~

== Professional record ==
20 Wins (13 Knockouts), 1 Defeats, 0 Draws
Res.	Record	Opponent	Type	Rd., Time	Date	Location	Notes
Win	20-1 (2)	(Puerto Rico) Jose Angel Roman	UD	6 (6)	2010-08-28	Coliseo Mario 'Quijote' Morales, Guaynabo, Puerto Rico	
Loss	19-1 (2)	(Argentina) Cesar Cuenca	UD	12 (12)	2009-03-20	Ce.De.M. N° 2, Caseros, Buenos Aires, Argentina	Loss WBO Latino light welterweight title
