= R\West =

American advertising agency

- Industry: Advertising
- Predecessor: Big Ads
- Founded: 1997; 29 years ago
- Headquarters: Portland, Oregon, United States
- Key people: Sarah Simmons, President; Elizabeth Morrow-Mackenzie, Executive Creative Director; Sean Blixseth, CEO
- Website: www.rwest.com

R\West is an American advertising agency based in Portland, Oregon that provides marketing, public relations, and related services. They are best known for the Trunk Monkey commercials, which they created in collaboration with Limbo Films for Suburban Auto Group.

== History ==
The company was founded in 1997 as Big Ads, and later changed its name to R\West. According to President Sean Blixseth (not to be confused with lawyer Sean Reed Blixseth), the 'R' in R\West stands for the messenger Revere, symbolizing the company's role as a messenger for its clients.

The agency gained national attention as dealerships across the U.S. licensed the ads. They also received some negative publicity from animal rights activists over their use of a trained chimpanzee.

== Recognition ==
R\West is notable for designing an award-winning kids' meal program for the fast food chain Burgerville. The program received the Grand Award in the 2004 Best Kids' Menu in America Competition. Through comic books, games and toys, young diners learn about locally grown food and natural resources in the Pacific Northwest.

== Awards ==
- 2007: two Emmys from The Northwest Chapter of the National Academy of Television Arts and Sciences in the commercial category for the best single-spot award for "Bridge" and best campaign award for "Abduction/Rescue", part of the Trunk Monkey campaign.
