= Hooked (horse) =

Australian-bred Thoroughbred racehorse

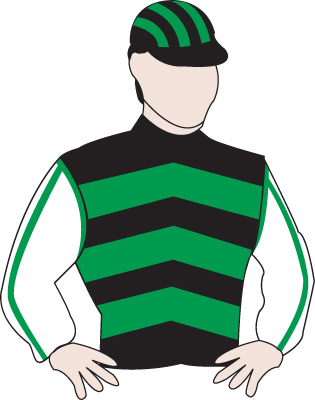
- Racing silks of Hooked
- Sire: Casino Prince
- Dam: Absolute Lure
- Damsire: Lure
- Sex: Stallion
- Foaled: 2010
- Country: Australia
- Colour: Bay
- Breeder: K J Hickman
- Owner: Sean Buckley
- Record: 37:6-2-2
- Earnings: $954,750

Major wins
- Cameron Handicap (2014); Crystal Mile (2014); Tramway Stakes (2015); Victoria Handicap (2017)

Hooked (foaled 30 October 2010) is an Australian Thoroughbred racehorse.

On 25 October 2014, he won the Crystal Mile.

== Background ==
Hooked is a 4 year old bay stallion from Australia, owned by Sean Buckley and trained by John P Thompson, based at Randwick. He is sired by the stallion Casino Prince out of the dam Absolute Lure.

== Racing career ==
On 25 October 2014 at Moonee Valley, Hooked was ridden by Craig Williams and scored his most significant win to date, getting the money in the $200,000 Schweppes Crystal Mile, defeating Bull Point.

Hooked recorded a time of 1:34.98, falling just short of Cabeza's benchmark of 1:34.78 seconds.

Craig Williams pushed Hooked forward from barrier one and settled on the tail of leader Havana Rey before surging clear before the bend and holding off the fast-finishing Bull Point and Desert Jeuney.

On Saturday 5 September 2015, Hooked won the Tramway Stakes 1400m Group 2 race at Royal Randwick Racecourse with jockey Tye Angland, winning prize money of $107,000.

On Saturday 15 April 2017, Hooked won the 1400m Group 3 mypunter.com Victoria Handicap with jockey Luke Nolan.
