= César Cuenca =

Argentine boxer (born 1981)

Personal information
- Nickname: El Distinto ("The Distinctive One")
- Born: César René Cuenca; 18 January 1981 (age 45) Tres Isletas, Chaco, Argentina
- Height: 5 ft 8 in (173 cm)
- Weight: Light welterweight

Boxing career
- Stance: Southpaw

Boxing record
- Total fights: 56
- Wins: 48
- Win by KO: 2
- Losses: 6
- No contests: 2

César René Cuenca (born 18 January 1981) is an Argentine professional boxer who held the IBF light welterweight title from 2015 to 2016.

== Professional career ==
On 20 March 2009, Cuenca won a twelve-round unanimous decision against undefeated contender Alex de Jesús.

On 3 May 2014, Cuenca defeated Albert Mensah to become the mandatory challenger for the IBF junior welterweight belt, held by American Lamont Peterson.

On 18 July 2015, he defeated Ik Yang in Macau by unanimous decision, in a bout he dominated and dropped his opponent, despite being knocked down himself. In the process, he won the vacant IBF light welterweight world championship, after a thirteen-year career, that spanned 49 fights prior, including two 'no contests'.

On 4 November 2015 Cuenca lost his world title in his next fight, when he faced Eduard Troyanovsky in Kazan, Russia. Cuenca, who was 48–0 at the time of the fight, was unable to get in range for the majority of the boxing match. Troyanovsky had re-hydrated much more than Cuenca and he seemed bigger in the ring, he used his size advantage well. After five rounds Cuenca had won just one, in a close fight, his left eye was cut open. In the sixth round, Troyanovsky landed a hard uppercut and Cuenca grabbed him at the waist, Troyanovsky leaned on the Argentine and he tumbled down, then as Troyanovsky was moving away it is possible that his foot hit Cuenca in his right eye. Immediately afterwards the American referee asked Cuenca if he could continue fighting, to which Cuenca told him in Spanish that his right eye was injured from the tumble and he needed time to recover, but the referee (who could not understand Spanish) asked him again more sternly and Cuenca repeated himself, gesturing to his right eye. The referee then waved off the fight, to the displeasure of Cuenca and his corner.

On 8 April 2016 Cuenca would get another shot at Eduard, he would lose via seventh round stoppage in the rematch.

== Professional boxing record ==
56 fights	48 wins	6 losses
By knockout	2	5
By decision	45	1
By disqualification	1	0
No contests	2	

No.	Result	Record	Opponent	Type	Round, time	Date	Location	Notes
56	Loss	48–6 (2)	Rico Mueller	TKO	4 (8), 0:15	14 February 2025	Boxhalle Schorfheide, Schorfheide, Germany	
55	Loss	48–5 (2)	Hamza Salahudin	RTD	4 (8), 3:00	2 December 2023	Arena Ludwigsburg, Ludwigsburg, Germany	
54	Loss	48–4 (2)	Ibrahim Guemues	TKO	8 (8), 1:34	22 February 2020	Halle, Recklinghausen, Germany	
53	Loss	48–3 (2)	Jonathan Jose Eniz	UD	10	12 January 2019	Polideportivo Islas Malvinas, Mar del Plata, Argentina	
52	Loss	48–2 (2)	Eduard Troyanovsky	TKO	7 (12), 2:14	8 April 2016	Soviet Wings Sport Palace, Moscow, Russia	For IBF and IBO light-welterweight titles
51	Loss	48–1 (2)	Eduard Troyanovsky	TKO	6 (12), 2:44	4 November 2015	TatNeft Arena, Kazan, Russia	Lost IBF light-welterweight title; For IBO light-welterweight title
50	Win	48–0 (2)	Ik Yang	UD	12	18 July 2015	Cotai Arena, Cotai, Macau	Won vacant IBF light-welterweight title
49	Win	47–0 (2)	Albert Mensah	UD	12	3 May 2014	Ce.De.M. N° 2, Caseros, Argentina	
48	Win	46–0 (2)	Patricio Antonio Pedrero	UD	8	23 November 2013	Estadio Pedro Estremador, San Carlos de Bariloche, Argentina	
47	Win	45–0 (2)	Gustavo David Bermúdez	UD	10	25 May 2013	Luna Park, Buenos Aires, Argentina	Won vacant WBO Latino light-welterweight title
46	Win	44–0 (2)	Diego Jesús Ponce	KO	5 (8)	9 March 2013	Asociación de Fomento, San Bernardo del Tuyú, Argentina	
45	Win	43–0 (2)	Claudio Alfredo Olmedo	UD	12	14 July 2012	Bomberos Voluntarios, General Villegas, Argentina	
44	Win	42–0 (2)	Luis Gustavo Sosa	UD	10	12 November 2011	Tres Isletas, Argentina	
43	Win	41–0 (2)	Sergio Omar Priotti	UD	10	2 September 2011	Club Once Unidos, Mar del Plata, Argentina	Retained WBO Latino light-welterweight title
42	Win	40–0 (2)	Juan Jose Dias	UD	8	26 March 2011	Club Unión Progresista, Villa Ángela, Argentina	
41	Win	39–0 (2)	Mauricio Ariel Pereira	UD	8	28 August 2010	Luna Park, Buenos Aires, Argentina	
40	Win	38–0 (2)	Cesar Leonardo Telechea	UD	10	6 August 2010	Tres Isletas, Argentina	Retained Argentine light-welterweight title
39	NC	37–0 (2)	Nazareno Gastón Ruíz	NC	1 (10)	22 May 2010	Casino City Center, Rosario, Argentina	
38	Win	37–0 (1)	Nazareno Gastón Ruíz	UD	12	19 December 2009	Anfiteatro Manuel Ramírez, Posadas, Argentina	Retained WBO Latino light-welterweight title
37	Win	36–0 (1)	Alex de Jesús	UD	12	20 March 2009	Ce.De.M. N° 2, Caseros, Argentina	Won WBO Latino light-welterweight title
36	Win	35–0 (1)	Pablo Andrés Godoy	UD	10	19 December 2008	Ce.De.M. N° 2, Caseros, Argentina	Won vacant WBC Latino light-welterweight title
35	Win	34–0 (1)	Ariel Francisco Burgos	DQ	9 (10)	18 October 2008	Villa Ángela, Chaco, Argentina	Retained Argentine light-welterweight title
34	Win	33–0 (1)	Marcelo Martín Miranda	UD	10	12 July 2008	Club Tomas de Rocamora, Concepción del Uruguay, Argentina	
33	Win	32–0 (1)	Juan Alberto Godoy	UD	10	8 March 2008	Estadio Pedro Estremador, San Carlos de Bariloche, Argentina	Retained Argentine light-welterweight title
32	Win	31–0 (1)	Sergio Javier Benítez	UD	6	27 October 2007	Ce.De.M. N° 2, Caseros, Argentina	
31	Win	30–0 (1)	Juan Alberto Godoy	UD	10	1 September 2007	Ce.De.M. N° 2, Caseros, Argentina	
30	Win	29–0 (1)	Diego Jesús Ponce	UD	6	15 June 2007	Ce.De.M. N° 1, Caseros, Argentina	
29	Win	28–0 (1)	Carlos Adán Jerez	UD	10	7 April 2007	Ce.De.M. N° 2, Caseros, Argentina	
28	Win	27–0 (1)	Victor Hugo Paz	UD	6	4 November 2006	Ce.De.M. N° 2, Caseros, Argentina	
27	Win	26–0 (1)	José Alfaro	MD	10	12 May 2006	Orfeo Superdomo, Córdoba, Argentina	
26	Win	25–0 (1)	Roberto David Arrieta	TD	8 (10)	11 March 2006	Ce.De.M. N° 2, Caseros, Argentina	
25	Win	24–0 (1)	Cristian Sebastián Paz	UD	8	14 January 2006	Club Independiente, Bahía Blanca, Argentina	
24	Win	23–0 (1)	Guillermo de Jesús Paz	UD	10	15 October 2005	Polideportivo Municipal, Colón, Argentina	
23	Win	22–0 (1)	Iván Orlando Bustos	UD	10	24 September 2005	Polideportivo Municipal, Luján, Argentina	Retained Argentine light-welterweight title
22	Win	21–0 (1)	Carlos Wilfredo Vilches	UD	10	30 July 2005	Ce.De.M. N° 2, Caseros, Argentina	Won Argentine light-welterweight title
21	Win	20–0 (1)	Andrés Pablo Villafañe	TKO	4 (8)	4 June 2005	Ce.De.M. N° 2, Caseros, Argentina	
20	Win	19–0 (1)	Pablo Ramón Barbero	UD	10	24 April 2005	Ce.De.M. N° 1, Caseros, Argentina	
19	Win	18–0 (1)	Héctor Ricardo Gómez	UD	10	18 December 2004	Estadio F.A.B., Buenos Aires, Argentina	
18	Win	17–0 (1)	Omar Leon	UD	10	16 October 2004	Ce.De.M. N° 2, Caseros, Argentina	
17	Win	16–0 (1)	Juan Alberto Godoy	UD	10	4 September 2004	Estadio F.A.B., Buenos Aires, Argentina	
16	Win	15–0 (1)	Carlos Abel Chaves	UD	8	10 June 2004	Ce.De.M. N° 1, Caseros, Argentina	
15	Win	14–0 (1)	Daniel Osvaldo Villalba	UD	8	28 May 2004	Tres Isletas, Argentina	
14	Win	13–0 (1)	Walter Damian Díaz	UD	8	24 April 2004	Ce.De.M. N° 2, Caseros, Argentina	
13	Win	12–0 (1)	Walter Sergio Gómez	UD	8	3 February 2004	Club Atletico Mar del Plata, Mar del Plata, Argentina	
12	Win	11–0 (1)	Julio González	UD	6	22 November 2003	Ce.De.M. N° 2, Caseros, Argentina	
11	Win	10–0 (1)	Daniel Osvaldo Villalba	UD	6	1 November 2003	Estadio F.A.B., Buenos Aires, Argentina	
10	NC	9–0 (1)	Daniel Osvaldo Villalba	NC	4 (1), 1:30	16 August 2003	Estadio F.A.B., Buenos Aires, Argentina	
9	Win	9–0	Daniel Osvaldo Villalba	UD	4	12 July 2003	Estadio F.A.B., Buenos Aires, Argentina	
8	Win	8–0	Andrés Alejandro Arno	UD	4	17 May 2003	Ce.De.M. N° 2, Caseros, Argentina	
7	Win	7–0	Ariel Francisco Burgos	SD	4	3 May 2003	Estadio F.A.B., Buenos Aires, Argentina	
6	Win	6–0	Víctor Daniel Ríos	UD	4	29 March 2003	Estadio F.A.B., Buenos Aires, Argentina	
5	Win	5–0	Carlos Roberto Rodríguez	UD	4	11 January 2003	Ce.De.M. N° 2, Caseros, Argentina	
4	Win	4–0	Oscar Roberto Medina	UD	4	14 December 2002	Estadio F.A.B., Buenos Aires, Argentina	
3	Win	3–0	Ramón Victorio Barrios	UD	4	19 October 2002	Estadio Luna Park, Buenos Aires, Argentina	
2	Win	2–0	Héctor Alberto González	UD	4	5 October 2002	Ce.De.M. N° 2, Caseros, Argentina	
1	Win	1–0	Guillermo Lezcano	UD	4	10 August 2002	Estadio F.A.B., Buenos Aires, Argentina	

== See also ==
- List of male boxers
- List of southpaw stance boxers
- List of world light-welterweight boxing champions

Sporting positions
Regional boxing titles
Preceded by Carlos Wilfredo Vilches	Argentine light-welterweight champion 30 July 2005 – 2011; Vacated	Vacant Title next held by Claudio Alfredo Olmedo
Vacant Title last held by Randall Bailey	WBC Latino light-welterweight champion 19 December 2008 – 2009; Vacated	Vacant Title next held by Antonio Pitalúa
Preceded by Alex de Jesús	WBO Latino light-welterweight champion 20 March 2009 – 2012; Vacated	Vacant Title next held by Mike Dallas Jr.
Vacant Title last held by Brandon Ríos	WBO Latino light-welterweight champion 25 May 2013 – 2014; Vacated	Vacant Title next held by Mauro Maximiliano Godoy
World boxing titles
Vacant Title last held by Lamont Peterson	IBF light-welterweight champion 18 July 2015 – 4 November 2015	Succeeded by Eduard Troyanovsky
