= Cameron Handicap =

Horse race in Australia

- Class: Group 3
- Location: Broadmeadow Racecourse, Newcastle, New South Wales, Australia
- Inaugurated: 1977
- Race type: Thoroughbred
- Sponsor: Newcastle Car and truck rental (2026)

Race information
- Distance: 1,500 metres
- Surface: Turf
- Track: Right-handed
- Qualification: Open handicap
- Purse: A$250,000 (2026)
- Bonuses: Winner exemption from a ballot on the Epsom Handicap

The Cameron Handicap is a Newcastle Jockey Club Group 3 Thoroughbred open handicap horse race over a distance of 1,500 metres, held at Broadmeadow Racecourse in Newcastle, New South Wales, Australia, in September.

== History ==
=== Grade ===
- Prior to 2005 – Listed race
- 2005 onwards – Group 3

=== Distance ===
- Prior to 2009 – 1300 metres
- 2009–2010 – 1400 metres
- 2011–2015 – 1500 metres
- 2016 – 1350 metres
- 2017 onwards – 1500 metres

=== Name ===
- Named after James George Cameron for lifelong dedication to Newcastle racing.

== Winners ==
The following are past winners of the race.

- 2026 - Fully Lit
- 2025 - Headley Grange
- 2024 - Here To Shock
- 2023 - Democracy Manifest
- 2022 - Wild Chap
- 2021 - Ashman
- 2020 - Rock
- 2019 – Rock
- 2018 – New Tipperary
- 2017 – Got Unders
- 2016 – Chetwood
- 2015 – Forget
- 2014 – Hooked
- 2013 – Toydini
- 2012 – Rolling Pin
- 2011 – Raspberries
- 2010 – Kenny's World
- 2009 – Absolutelyfabulous
- 2008 – Raheeb
- 2007 – race not held
- 2006 – Court's In Session
- 2005 – Collate
- 2004 – Osca Warrior
- 2003 – Archave
- 2002 – Excellerator
- 2001 – Kingsgate
- 2000 – Mulan Princess
- 1999 – Anthems
- 1998 – Adam
- 1997 – Crows Before Dawn
- 1996 – Cohort
- 1995 – Yarradorf
- 1994 – Social Rule
- 1993 – Flitter
- 1992 – Brihuego
- 1991 – Quick Score
- 1990 – Cheval Cavalier
- 1989 – Don't Play
- 1988 – Windsor's Pal
- 1987 – Full Page
- 1986 – Sound Of Bells
- 1985 – Regal Value
- 1984 – Almerzo
- 1983 – Tandrio
- 1982 – Manuan
- 1981 – Paradise Plumes
- 1980 – Captain Cadet
- 1979 – Romantic Dream
- 1978 – Manawapoi
- 1977 – Luskin Star

== See also ==
- Newcastle Gold Cup
- Tibbie Stakes
- List of Australian Group races
- Group races
