= Xiong Chaozhong =

Chinese boxer

Personal information
- Nickname: Little Bear
- Nationality: Chinese
- Born: October 3, 1982 (age 43) Wénshān, China
- Height: 5 ft 0 in (152 cm)
- Weight: Mini-flyweight; Light-flyweight; Flyweight

Boxing career
- Reach: 60 1/2 in (154 cm)
- Stance: Orthodox

Boxing record
- Total fights: 36
- Wins: 27
- Win by KO: 14
- Losses: 8
- Draws: 1

Xiong Chaozhong or Xiong Zhaozhong (born October 3, 1982) is a Chinese professional boxer. He is the first Chinese/Hmong to win a boxing world title, having held the WBC mini-flyweight title from 2012 to 2014.

== Early life ==
Xiong was born in rural Wénshān to two Hmong farmers, from which he was the second child. Xiong grew up in poverty and after one year in high school, he dropped out to find work to support his family. Xiong ended up working in coal mines and in a banana plantation. Xiong used to fight often in his youth, resulting in his cousins to convince him to try boxing professionally, so as a result Xiong moved to Kunming. It was in Kunming, China where he began to train under Zovi Boxing behind the Garden Hotel in northern Kunming. While there, he was trained by American coach Abraham Darwish for 7 years. With no amateur experience, Xiong was developed into a world-level fighter.

== Professional career ==
Xiong debuted as a professional shortly after arriving in Kunming with a points draw against Yu Ling Feng on August 15, 2006. Xiong won his next 11 fights, eight of them by stoppage, and claimed the WBC-ABCO Continental light-flyweight title. However, he would lose the title in his first defense, losing a unanimous decision to Filipino journeyman Julius Alcos. On May 26, 2009, Xiong challenged Daisuke Naito for the WBC flyweight title in Tokyo. Xiong had a considerable size disadvantage, but he was able to drop Naito in round 6. Per WBC rules, Xiong had two points deducted for accidental headbutts which opened cuts on Naito. Naito also had a point deduction after an accidental headbutt cut Xiong in round 10. Naito retained his title with a close unanimous decision (114–110, 114–111, 113–111) win. Over the next three years, Xiong suffered two more losses in Japan, losing decisions to Takuya Kogawa and Shin Ono.

Xiong defeated Javier Martínez Resendiz for the vacant WBC mini-flyweight title in Kunming. This victory made Xiong the first Chinese boxer to ever win a world title. Xiong cut Martínez in the third round and outboxed him for most of the fight, winning a unanimous decision (116–114, 116-112 and 119–110). Xiong's next fight took place in Dubai, where he faced Denver Cuello in a mandatory defense. Xiong was dropped in the first round. However, Cuello was unable to use his right hand because of a torn rotator cuff. Nevertheless, the fight remained close and Xiong won a narrow majority decision (113-113, 113–110, 115–112). After a further defense, Xiong faced Oswaldo Novoa in February 2014. Xiong was stopped via technical knockout in round 5, losing his world title on his third defense.

On October 25, 2014, Xiong attempted to regain a world title, facing WBA mini-flyweight champion Hekkie Budler in Monaco. Budler and Xiong traded knockdowns in the second and third rounds. The rest of the fight remained close, but Budler retained with a unanimous decision win (114–112, 114–112, 118–108). Xiong's final title challenge took place in 2018, when he faced WBA mini-flyweight champion Knockout CP Freshmart. Knockout outpointed Xiong to take a wide unanimous decision win (118–110, 118–110, 116–112). Xiong announced his retirement after the fight.

== Professional boxing record ==
36 fights	27 wins	8 losses
By knockout	14	1
By decision	13	7
Draws	1	

No.	Result	Record	Opponent	Type	Round, time	Date	Location	Notes
36	Loss	27–8–1	Knockout CP Freshmart	UD	12	27 Jul 2018	Guosen Gymnasium, Qingdao, China	For WBA mini-flyweight title
35	Win	27–7–1	Panya Pradabsri	MD	12	3 Oct 2017	University Gym, Datong, China	Won vacant WBA International mini-flyweight title
34	Loss	26–7–1	Jose Antonio Jimenez	SD	12	25 May 2016	Diamond Court, Beijing, China	
33	Win	26–6–1	Crison Omayao	UD	10	18 Sep 2015	Yageer Gymnasium, Ningbo, China	Retained WBC International mini-flyweight title; Won vacant OPBF mini-flyweight title
32	Win	25–6–1	Hiroya Yamamoto	UD	10	22 Feb 2015	Wenshan, China	Won vacant WBC International mini-flyweight title
31	Loss	24–6–1	Hekkie Budler	UD	12	25 Oct 2014	Salle des Etoiles, Monte Carlo, Monaco	For WBA and IBO mini-flyweight titles
30	Win	24–5–1	Jack Amisa	RTD	9 (10), 3:00	25 Jul 2014	Central South University of Forestry and Technology Gym, Changsha, China	
29	Win	23–5–1	Roilo Golez	TKO	5 (10), 2:39	16 May 2014	City Gymnasium, Nanyang, China	
28	Loss	22–5–1	Oswaldo Novoa	TKO	5 (12), 2:36	5 Feb 2014	City Hall, Haikou, China	Lost WBC mini-flyweight title
27	Win	22–4–1	Lookrak Kiatmungmee	TKO	5 (12), 1:59	30 Nov 2013	Maguan, China	Retained WBC mini-flyweight title
26	Win	21–4–1	Denver Cuello	MD	12	28 Jun 2013	World Trade Centre, Dubai, UAE	Retained WBC mini-flyweight title
25	Win	20–4–1	Javier Martínez Resendiz	UD	12	24 Nov 2012	City Stadium, Kunming, China	Won vacant WBC mini-flyweight title
24	Win	19–4–1	Osvaldo Razon	UD	12	12 Jun 2012	City Stadium, Kunming, China	Won vacant WBC Silver light-flyweight title
23	Loss	18–4–1	Shin Ono	UD	8	22 Apr 2012	Tateyama Gym, Toyama, Japan	
22	Win	18–3–1	Guy-Hun Lee	KO	4 (12), 2:00	25 Mar 2012	EXPO Garden Hotel, Kunming, China	
21	Win	17–3–1	Daisuke Iida	UD	12	19 Nov 2011	EXPO Garden Hotel, Kunming, China	Won WBC–CBZ light-flyweight title
20	Win	16–3–1	Rodel Tejares	SD	12	27 Jun 2011	Huili, China	Retained interim WBC–ABCO light-flyweight title
19	Win	15–3–1	Pongpan Patanakan Gym	KO	4 (12), 0:23	18 Dec 2010	City Stadium, Kunming, China	Won vacant IBF Pan Pacific and interim WBC–ABCO light-flyweight titles
18	Win	14–3–1	Yasuaki Sato	UD	10	9 Jul 2010	EXPO Garden Hotel, Kunming, China	Retained WBC–ABCO Continental light-flyweight title
17	Win	13–3–1	Herrio Patakomgym	KO	3 (10)	24 Jan 2010	EXPO Garden Hotel, Kunming, China	Won vacant WBC–ABCO Continental light-flyweight title
16	Loss	12–3–1	Takuya Kogawa	UD	10	7 Jul 2009	Korakuen Hall, Tokyo, Japan	
15	Loss	12–2–1	Daisuke Naito	UD	12	26 May 2009	Differ Ariake, Tokyo, Japan	For WBC flyweight title
14	Win	12–1–1	Zhao Kang Jia	UD	8	17 Dec 2008	EXPO Garden Hotel, Kunming, China	
13	Loss	11–1–1	Julius Alcos	UD	12	6 Nov 2008	Sichuan Gymnasium, Chengdu, China	Lost WBC–ABCO Continental light-flyweight title
12	Win	11–0–1	Yang Chao	TKO	7 (8)	26 Jul 2008	EXPO Garden Hotel, Kunming, China	
11	Win	10–0–1	Numchai Taksinisan	KO	1 (12)	21 Mar 2008	Luzhou, China	Won vacant WBC–ABCO Continental light-flyweight title
10	Win	9–0–1	Lin Guo Wei	KO	1 (6)	1 Dec 2007	EXPO Garden Hotel, Kunming, China	
9	Win	8–0–1	Numchai Kiatpaiboun	UD	6	9 Oct 2007	Sichuan Stadium Center, Chengdu, China	
8	Win	7–0–1	Li Beng	KO	2 (6)	25 Aug 2007	EXPO Garden Hotel, Kunming, China	
7	Win	6–0–1	Zhou Hai Feng	KO	5 (6)	14 Jul 2007	EXPO Garden Hotel, Kunming, China	
6	Win	5–0–1	Bai Jun	KO	2 (6), 1:58	8 Jun 2007	EXPO Garden Hotel, Kunming, China	
5	Win	4–0–1	Zhang Rong Zhe	TKO	6 (10)	21 Apr 2007	EXPO Garden Hotel, Kunming, China	
4	Win	3–0–1	Wang Xin Yu	UD	6	24 Mar 2007	EXPO Garden Hotel, Kunming, China	
3	Win	2–0–1	Zhang Rong Zhe	TKO	2 (6), 1:23	26 Jan 2007	EXPO Garden Hotel, Kunming, China	
2	Win	1–0–1	Zhang Rong Zhe	MD	4	21 Dec 2006	EXPO Garden Hotel, Kunming, China	
1	Draw	0–0–1	Yu Ling Feng	PTS	4	15 Aug 2006	EXPO Garden Hotel, Kunming, China	

Sporting positions
World boxing titles
Vacant Title last held by Kazuto Ioka	WBC mini-flyweight champion November 24, 2012 – February 5, 2014	Succeeded by Oswaldo Novoa
