= Randy Petalcorin =

Filipino boxer

Personal information
- Nickname: Razor
- Nationality: Filipino
- Born: Randy Formentera Petalcorin; 31 December 1991 (age 34) Davao City, Davao del Sur, Philippines
- Height: 5 ft 3 in (160 cm)
- Weight: Light flyweight; Flyweight

Boxing career
- Reach: 67 in (170 cm)
- Stance: Southpaw

Boxing record
- Total fights: 37
- Wins: 32
- Win by KO: 23
- Losses: 4
- Draws: 1

Randy Formemtera Petalcorin (born 31 December 1991) is a Filipino professional boxer who held the WBA interim light-flyweight title from 2014 to 2015. He has challenged twice for light-flyweight world championships; the IBF title in 2018 and the WBC title in 2019.

== Professional career ==
Petalcorin fights in the light-flyweight division and was dubbed "Ultra Tune" when sponsored by the Australian car service franchise He fought in Melbourne, Australia on Peter Maniatis events between 2013 and 2017, training at the Boxingfit Gym in Port Melbourne.

He won the WBA interim light-flyweight title against Walter Tello via seventh-round technical knockout in Shanghai, China, in front of 15,000 strong crowd on a Top Rank promoted card with Hall of Fame promoter Bob Arum ringside. Audience member, fellow Filipino boxer Manny Pacquiao, jumped into the ring when Petalcorin won the WBA interim title to congratulate him.

Petalcorin trained in Melbourne using a high altitude training scheme with his co-sponsors Altitude Services, led by Rod Cedaro.

On 24 April 2015 in Beijing, he won his title fight against Ma Yi Ming by first-round knockout at 1 minute and 45 seconds.

On 10 November 2017 Randy won his fight in the first round by knockout against Oscar Raknafa at Malvern Town Hall in Melbourne.

== Professional boxing record ==
37 fights	32 wins	4 losses
By knockout	23	3
By decision	8	1
By disqualification	1	0
Draws	1	

No.	Result	Record	Opponent	Type	Round, time	Date	Location	Notes
37	Win	32–4–1	Jayar Diama	UD	6	9 Mar 2023	Norala, Cotabato del Sur, Philippines	
36	Loss	31–4–1	Kenshiro Teraji	TKO	4 (12), 1:08	23 Dec 2019	Arena, Yokohama, Kanagawa, Japan	For WBC Light flyweight title.
35	Win	31–3–1	Reymark Taday	UD	8	20 Oct 2019	Robinson’s Mall, General Santos City, Cotabato del Sur, Philippines	
34	Win	30–3–1	Worawatchai Boonjan	TKO	3 (8) 1:28	9 Jun 2019	Tv5 Studio, Novaliches, Quezon City, Metro Manila, Philippines	
33	Loss	29–3–1	Felix Alvarado	TKO	7 (12), 2:04	29 Oct 2018	Midas Hotel and Casino, Pasay, Metro Manila, Philippines	For vacant IBF Light Flyweight title
32	Win	29–2–1	Jade Yagahon	KO	1 (6) 1:44	19 May 2018	Polomolok Gym, Polomolok, Philippines	
31	Win	28–2–1	Oscar Raknafa	TKO	1 (10) 2:59	10 Nov 2017	Town Hall, Malvern, Victoria, Australia	
30	Win	27–2–1	Jetly Purisima	TKO	6 (6) 0:27	9 Sep 2017	Polomolok Gym, Polomolok, Philippines	
29	Win	26–2–1	Mark Anthony Florida	RTD	6 (8) 3:00	26 Feb 2017	Lagao Gym, General Santos, Philippines	
28	Win	25–2–1	Arnold Garde	UD	10	4 Dec 2016	Robinson’s Mall Atrium, General Santos, Philippines	Won vacant IBF Pan Pacific Light Flyweight title
27	Win	24–2–1	Donny Mabao	UD	10	27 Sep 2016	Barangay Saint Felomina, Iligan City, Lanao del Norte, Philippines	
26	Loss	23–2–1	Omari Kimweri	SD	12	15 Apr 2016	The Melbourne Pavilion, Flemington, Victoria, Australia	For vacant WBC Silver Flyweight title.
25	Win	23–1–1	Ma Yiming	TKO	1 (12)	24 Apr 2015	Capital Gym, Beijing, China	Retained interim WBA Light Flyweight title.
24	Win	22–1–1	Walter Tello	TKO	7 (12)	26 Aug 2014	Mercedes-Benz Arena, Shanghai, China	Won interim WBA Light Flyweight title.
23	Win	21–1–1	Samransak Singmanasak	TKO	2 (10), 1:04	28 Mar 2014	Town Hall, Malvern, Victoria, Australia	
22	Win	20–1–1	Samransak Singmanasak	TKO	3 (12), 1:14	8 Nov 2013	Town Hall, Malvern, Victoria, Australia	
21	Draw	19–1–1	Rene Patilano	TD	8 (12), 2:23	16 Feb 2013	PAGCOR Grand Theatre, Parañaque, Metro Manila, Philippines	Retained PABA Light Flyweight title.
20	Win	19–1	Jovel Romasasa	TKO	3 (8), 1:45	8 Dec 2012	Central Market, Iligan, Lanao del Norte, Philippines	
19	Win	18–1	Michael Bastasa	UD	8	30 Sep 2012	MLCBA Gym, Iligan, Lanao del Norte, Philippines	
18	Win	17–1	Wittawas Basapean	UD	12	21 Apr 2012	Mandaluyong Gym, Mandaluyong, Metro Manila, Philippines	Won vacant PABA Light Flyweight title.
17	Win	16–1	Jherald Tuyor	TKO	2 (6), 2:55	23 Oct 2011	Buug Public Market, Buug, Zamboanga Sibugay, Philippines	
16	Win	15–1	Arnel Tadena	UD	10	24 Sep 2011	MSU-IIT Gym, Iligan, Lanao del Norte, Philippines	
15	Win	14–1	Michael Rodriguez	DQ	8 (12), 1:39	6 Aug 2011	Mandaue City Sports and Cultural Complex, Mandaue, Cebu, Philippines	Won interim PABA Light Flyweight title.
14	Win	13–1	Yodchingchai Sithkonnapha	KO	1 (12), 1:03	11 Jun 2011	Lagao Gym, General Santos, South Cotabato, Philippines	Won vacant ABC Continental Light Flyweight title.
13	Win	12–1	Juanito Tumugsok	TKO	2 (6), 2:51	25 Apr 2011	Salug Gym, Salug, Zamboanga del Norte, Philippines	
12	Win	11–1	Rogen Flores	TKO	5 (10), 2:17	26 Feb 2011	Lagao Gym, General Santos, South Cotabato, Philippines	Retained PBF Flyweight title.
11	Win	10–1	Allan Doronilla	KO	2 (10), 1:08	4 Dec 2010	Glan Municipal Gym, Glan, Sarangani, Philippines	Won PBF Flyweight title.
10	Win	9–1	Rey Morano	TKO	1 (6), 2:22	6 Oct 2010	Glan Municipal Gym, Glan, Sarangani, Philippines	
9	Win	8–1	Charlie Cabilla	KO	8 (10), 1:15	5 Sep 2010	Polomolok Gym, Polomolok, South Cotabato, Philippines	
8	Win	7–1	Allan Doronilla	TKO	2 (10), 2:52	23 Jul 2010	Ipil, Zamboanga Sibugay, Philippines	Won MinProBA Light Flyweight title.
7	Win	6–1	Michael Bastasa	UD	8	15 Jul 2010	Barangay San Jose, Aurora, Zamboanga del Sur, Philippines	
6	Loss	5–1	Marlon Tapales	TKO	2 (8), 2:50	23 Jan 2010	Cuneta Astrodome, Pasay, Metro Manila, Philippines	
5	Win	5–0	Ricardo Claveria	TKO	4 (8), 1:48	31 Oct 2009	Polomolok Gym, Polomolok, South Cotabato, Philippines	
4	Win	4–0	Wennie Bartiquel	TKO	2 (6), 2:23	3 Sep 2009	Polomolok Gym, Polomolok, South Cotabato, Philippines	
3	Win	3–0	Jherom Tuyor	TKO	3 (6), 1:41	27 Jul 2009	Polanco, Zamboanga del Norte, Philippines	
2	Win	2–0	Rolando Palac	TKO	2 (4), 1:47	28 May 2009	Maasim Municipal Gymnasium, Maasim, Sarangani, Philippines	
1	Win	1–0	Sherwin McDo Lungay	TKO	1 (4), 1:25	28 Mar 2009	Oval Gym, General Santos, South Cotabato, Philippines	Professional debut.

== See also ==
- List of southpaw stance boxers

Sporting positions
World boxing titles
Vacant Title last held by Alberto Rossel	WBA light flyweight champion Interim title August 26, 2014 – April 15, 2016; Vacated	Vacant Title next held by Daniel Matellon
