= Trunk Monkey =

Viral ad campaign from 2003

Trunk Monkey is a concept originally created in January, 2000 by Sean Sosik-Hamor for the automotive group of Subaru enthusiasts in the New England Subaru Impreza Club, or NESIC. The original concept of a "Trunk Monkey" was a small stuffed animal placed in the trunk of a vehicle which came alive and jumped from side to side to help distribute weight during "spirited driving maneuvers".

The Trunk Monkey television ads, loosely based on this concept, were created in 2003 by the advertising agency R\West in Portland, Oregon. Originally created for the Suburban Auto Group of Sandy, Oregon, the spots have also been syndicated to multiple dealerships across the country.

== Premise ==
The commercials focus on the Trunk Monkey, a fictional dealer-installed car option. The optional feature consists of a live chimpanzee inside the trunk and a special button in the passenger compartment. The button is pressed in situations not found in the user's manual such as handling irate drivers in traffic, dealing with unruly children throwing eggs at the car, negotiating with highway patrol officers after being pulled over, helping deliver a child when a nearby hospital is not accessible, or dispatching a gang in the parking lot. The Trunk Monkey is also portrayed as an effective theft deterrent, as seen in one commercial where the chimpanzee knocks out a would-be car thief and throws him off a bridge. The chimpanzee also administers first aid to the driver after an accident. In addition, its security abilities are effective during a driver's daughter's first date or an alien invasion.

== As slang ==
Among private military companies, a rear gunner in an SUV is often referred to as a trunk monkey. The term is also used loosely in military circles for mechanized infantry, especially when dismounted from their vehicles.
