= Spring Stakes (NJC) =

NJC 3YO Spring Stakes
- Class: Group 3
- Location: Broadmeadow Racecourse, Newcastle, New South Wales
- Inaugurated: 1984
- Race type: Thoroughbred - flat
- Sponsor: New Zealand Bloodstock (2019-2026)

Race information
- Distance: 1,600 metres
- Surface: Turf
- Track: Right-handed
- Qualification: Three-year-olds
- Weight: Set weights
- Purse: A$250,000 (2026)

The NJC 3YO Spring Stakes is a Newcastle Jockey Club Group 3 Thoroughbred horse race for three-year-olds at set weights, over a distance of 1600 metres, held annually at Broadmeadow Racecourse, Newcastle, New South Wales, Australia in November.

== History ==
Due to the reconstruction of the Broadmeadow Racecourse in 2016 the event was rescheduled for February 2017 and held at Randwick Racecourse.

=== Grade ===
- 1984–1998 - Listed race
- 1999 onwards - Group 3

== Winners ==
The following are past winners of the race.

- 2026 - Katoto
- 2025 - Green Spaces
- 2024 - Snitzanova
- 2023 - Genzano
- 2022 - Pierossa
- 2021 - Festival Dancer
- 2020 - The Elanora
- 2019 - Asiago
- 2018 - Aramayo
- 2017 (September) - Astoria
- 2017 (February) - ‡Invincible Gem
- 2015 - Devil Hawk
- 2014 - Sweynesse
- 2013 - Savvy Nature
- 2012 - Proisir
- 2011 - Darci Be Good
- 2010 - Ilovethiscity
- 2009 - Lovemelikearock
- 2008 - Sousa
- 2007 - †race not held
- 2006 - Mearas
- 2005 - Hotel Grand
- 2004 - Lotteria
- 2003 - Allgunadoit
- 2002 - Clangalang
- 2001 - Magic Albert
- 2000 - Universal Prince
- 1999 - Shogun Lodge
- 1998 - Dracula
- 1997 - Encounter
- 1996 - Ebony Grosve
- 1995 - Vernal
- 1994 - Obsessed
- 1993 - Mistador
- 1992 - Coronation Day
- 1991 - Enjoy Dancing
- 1990 - Bright Kite
- 1989 - Procol Harum
- 1988 - Royal Pardon
- 1987 - All Ashore
- 1986 - Imprimatur
- 1985 - Easter
- 1984 - Blazing Devil

† Not held because of outbreak of equine influenza
‡ Due to the reconstruction of the Broadmeadow Racecourse in 2016 the event was rescheduled for 11 February 2017 and held at Randwick Racecourse.

== See also ==
- List of Australian Group races
- Group races
