= Tibbie Stakes =

- Class: Group 3
- Location: Broadmeadow Racecourse, Newcastle, New South Wales, Australia
- Race type: Thoroughbred
- Sponsor: NZB (2025 & 2026)

Race information
- Distance: 1,400 metres
- Surface: Turf
- Track: Right-handed
- Qualification: Fillies and mares, three year old and older
- Weight: Set weights with penalties
- Purse: $250,000 (2026)

The Tibbie Stakes, is a Newcastle Jockey Club Group 3 Thoroughbred horse race for fillies and mares, at set weights with penalties, over a distance of 1400 metres, held at Broadmeadow Racecourse, Newcastle, New South Wales, Australia in September.

== History ==
=== Distance ===
- 2005–2015 – 1400 metres
- 2016 – 1350 metres
- 2017 onwards – 1400 metres

=== Grade ===
- 2005–2012 – Listed Race
- 2013 onwards – Group 3

== Winners ==
The following are past winners of the race.

- 2026 - Perfumist
- 2025 – Oh Diamond Lil
- 2024 – Terra Mater
- 2023 – Banana Queen
- 2022 – Hope In Your Heart
- 2021 – Madam Legend
- 2020 – All Saints' Eve
- 2019 – Sweet Deal
- 2018 – Princess Posh
- 2017 – Zanbagh
- 2016 – Spirit Bird
- 2015 – She's Clean
- 2014 – Fine Bubbles
- 2013 – Vaquera
- 2012 – Nocturnelle
- 2011 – More Strawberries
- 2010 – Vintedge
- 2009 – Moti
- 2008 – Miss Pageantry
- 2007 – †race not held
- 2006 – Yolo
- 2005 – Shalimar Sky

† Not held because of outbreak of equine influenza

== See also ==
- Cameron Handicap
- Newcastle Gold Cup
- List of Australian Group races
- Group races
