= Australian Automotive Aftermarket Association =

Australia automotive parts industry organisation

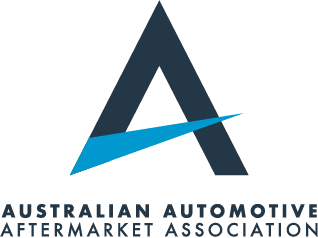
- Formation: 1980
- Headquarters: Melbourne, Victoria, Australia
- Members: 2,350+
- Chairman: Mark Pedder
- Key people: Stuart Charity, CEO
- Website: www.aaaa.com.au

The Australian Automotive Aftermarket Association (AAAA) is an automotive industry association that represents the automotive aftermarket parts and accessories industry and companies that are involved in manufacturing, re-manufacturing, wholesaling, distributing and retailing of vehicle parts, tools, equipment, accessories and services. Established in 1980, the AAAA represents the interests of businesses in this particular market segment on a national level.

The association is a not-for-profit organisation and provides members with access to a number of services and business development initiatives. The AAAA now represents over 2,300 members through a range of advocacy activities to promote their interests within Australia and overseas.

== Advocacy ==
The AAAA represents the automotive aftermarket industry before federal, state and local governments and other regulatory bodies. The AAAA actively participates in more than 20 Standards Australia committees, liaises with international automotive aftermarket industry associations and attends major international automotive aftermarket events.

The AAAA operates special interest groups dedicated to prominent sectors in the Australian automotive aftermarket. The first launched in late 2005 was the Performance, Racing and Tuning Council and in November 2006, the Australian 4WD Industry Council was launched. In 2015, the AAAA launched the Australian Automotive Product Manufacturers and Exporters Council to support parts-makers beyond the exit of vehicle manufacturers Ford, Holden and Toyota in 2016 and 2017. Each of these special interest groups promotes and advocates on behalf of their sector, and provides specialist advice to government and regulators. Membership is restricted to businesses involved in the relevant sectors.

The AAAA launched its Choice of Repairer campaign in 2009, with the intention of promoting choice and competition in vehicle repair, servicing, replacement parts and accessories sector by eliminating any technical or legal barriers that impact on Australian consumers' right to have their vehicle serviced, maintained and repaired at the workshop of their choice. After several years of advocacy by the AAAA, a major inquiry into data sharing was undertaken the Commonwealth Consumer Affairs Advisory Council in 2012. Following the publication of this report, a voluntary agreement was reached between AAAA and four other industry associations on the sharing of essential service and repair data.

== Business Development ==
The AAAA actively promotes the automotive aftermarket industry throughout Australia and overseas. Working with Government agencies, trade show promoters and international automotive aftermarket associations, the AAAA regularly leads delegations of exhibitors and buyers to international trade shows and events. The AAAA's own trade show, the Australian Auto Aftermarket Expo, provides a forum for industry to promote its products and services and develop new business, both locally and internationally. In 2007, the Collision Repair Expo was launched in conjunction with the Australian Auto Aftermarket Expo.

In March 2012 the AAAA was appointed the main auspice body for Australian Automotive Week by the Victorian Government and coordinated a comprehensive program to promote the industry's products and services to local and export markets.
