= Show County Quality =

Australian horse race

- Class: Group 3
- Location: Randwick Racecourse, Sydney, Australia
- Inaugurated: 1993
- Race type: Thoroughbred
- Sponsor: Hyland Race Colours (2025 & 26)

Race information
- Distance: 1,200 metres
- Surface: Turf
- Track: Right-handed
- Qualification: Horses three years old and older
- Weight: Quality; Minimum weight – 53 kg Maximum weight – 61 kg
- Purse: $250,000 (2026)

The Show County Quality is an Australian Turf Club Group 3 Thoroughbred horse race for three-year-olds and older, run as a quality handicap over a distance of 1200 metres at Randwick Racecourse, Sydney, Australia in August.

== History ==
The race is named in honour of the versatile sprinter Show County, who as a two-year-old and three year old in 1988 and 1989 won the following races:

- Breeders' Plate
- Silver Slipper Stakes
- Maribyrnong Plate
- Skyline Stakes
- Stan Fox Stakes
- San Domenico Stakes
- Roman Consul Stakes.

=== Grade ===
- 1993–2012 - Listed race
- 2013 onwards - Group 3

=== Venue ===
- 1993–1994 - Randwick Racecourse
- 1995–1999 - Warwick Farm Racecourse
- 2000 - Canterbury Park Racecourse
- 2001–2004 - Warwick Farm Racecourse
- 2005–2006 - Randwick Racecourse
- 2008 onwards - Warwick Farm Racecourse
- 2009 - Randwick Racecourse
- 2010–2013 - Warwick Farm Racecourse
- 2014 onwards - Randwick Racecourse

== Winners ==
Previous winners of the race are:

- 2026 - Midnight In Tokyo
- 2025 - Lazzura
- 2024 - Joliestar
- 2023 - Buenos Noches
- 2022 - Showmanship
- 2021 - Private Eye
- 2020 - Roheryn
- 2019 - Deprive
- 2018 - Le Romain
- 2017 - Deploy
- 2016 - Tycoon Tara
- 2015 - Decision Time
- 2014 - Terravista
- 2013 - Rebel Dane
- 2012 - Moment of Change
- 2011 - Skytrain
- 2010 - Kenny's World
- 2009 - Swift Alliance
- 2008 - Bank Robber
- 2007 - †race not held
- 2006 - Primus
- 2005 - Lotteria
- 2004 - Athelnoth
- 2003 - Sportsman
- 2002 - Presently
- 2001 - Kingsgate
- 2000 - Stanzaic
- 1999 - Upright
- 1998 - Siddinghausen
- 1997 - Might And Power
- 1996 - Winning Hand
- 1995 - Identikit
- 1994 - Remouche
- 1993 - Big Dreams

† Not held because of outbreak of equine influenza

== See also ==
- Premier's Cup (ATC)
- Toy Show Quality
- Silver Shadow Stakes
- Winx Stakes
- List of Australian Group races
- Group races
