= Winx Stakes =

Winx Stakes registered as the Warwick Stakes
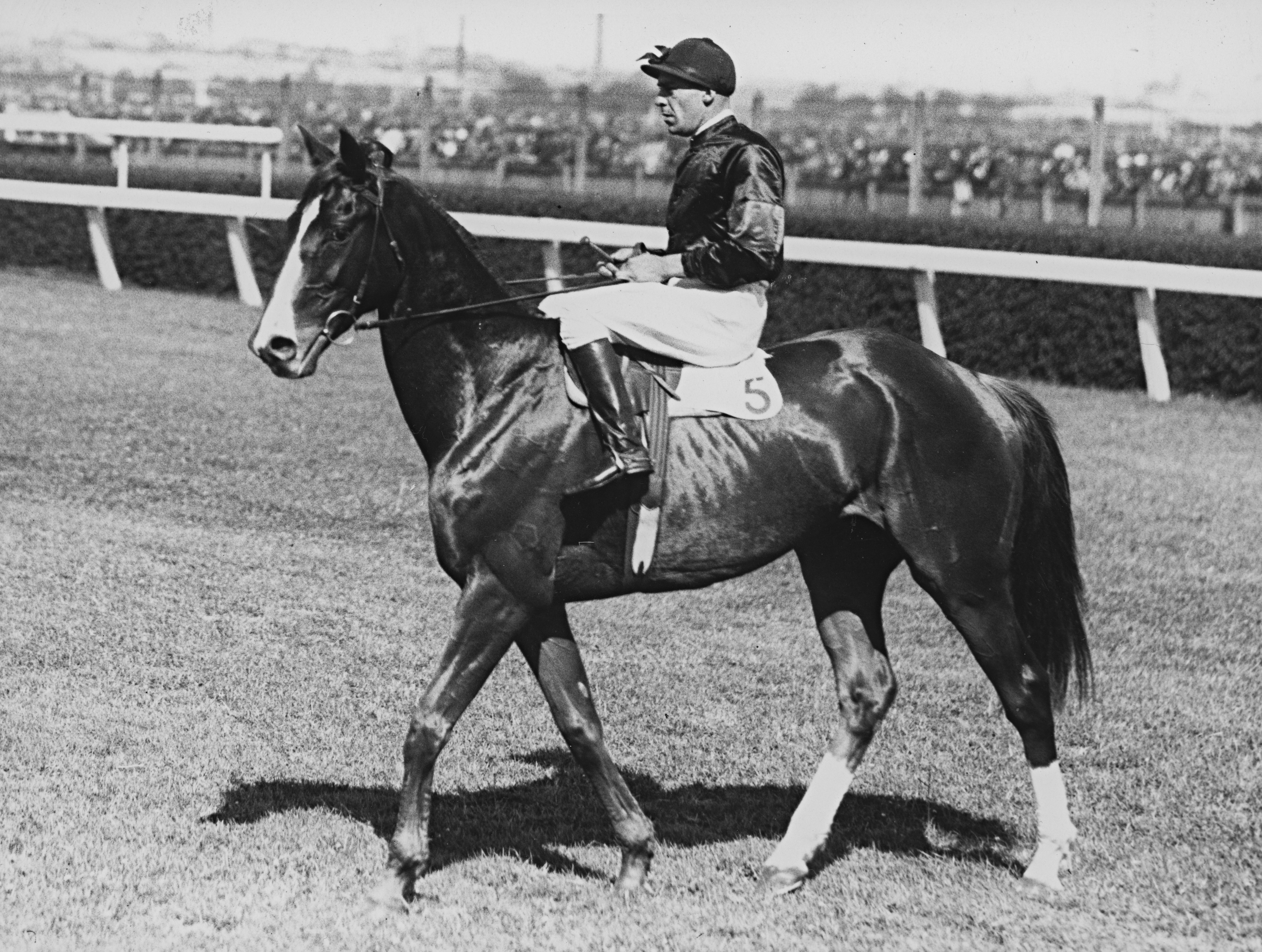
- Rogilla, 1935 DH winner
- Class: Group 1
- Location: Randwick Racecourse; Sydney, Australia
- Inaugurated: 1923
- Race type: Thoroughbred

Race information
- Distance: 1,400 metres
- Surface: Turf
- Track: Right-handed
- Qualification: Three year olds and older
- Weight: Weight for Age
- Purse: $1,000,000 (2026)

The Winx Stakes, registered as the Warwick Stakes, is a Group 1 Australian Turf Club thoroughbred horse race at Weight for Age, for three-year-olds and older over a distance of 1400 metres at Randwick Racecourse, Sydney, Australia in August.

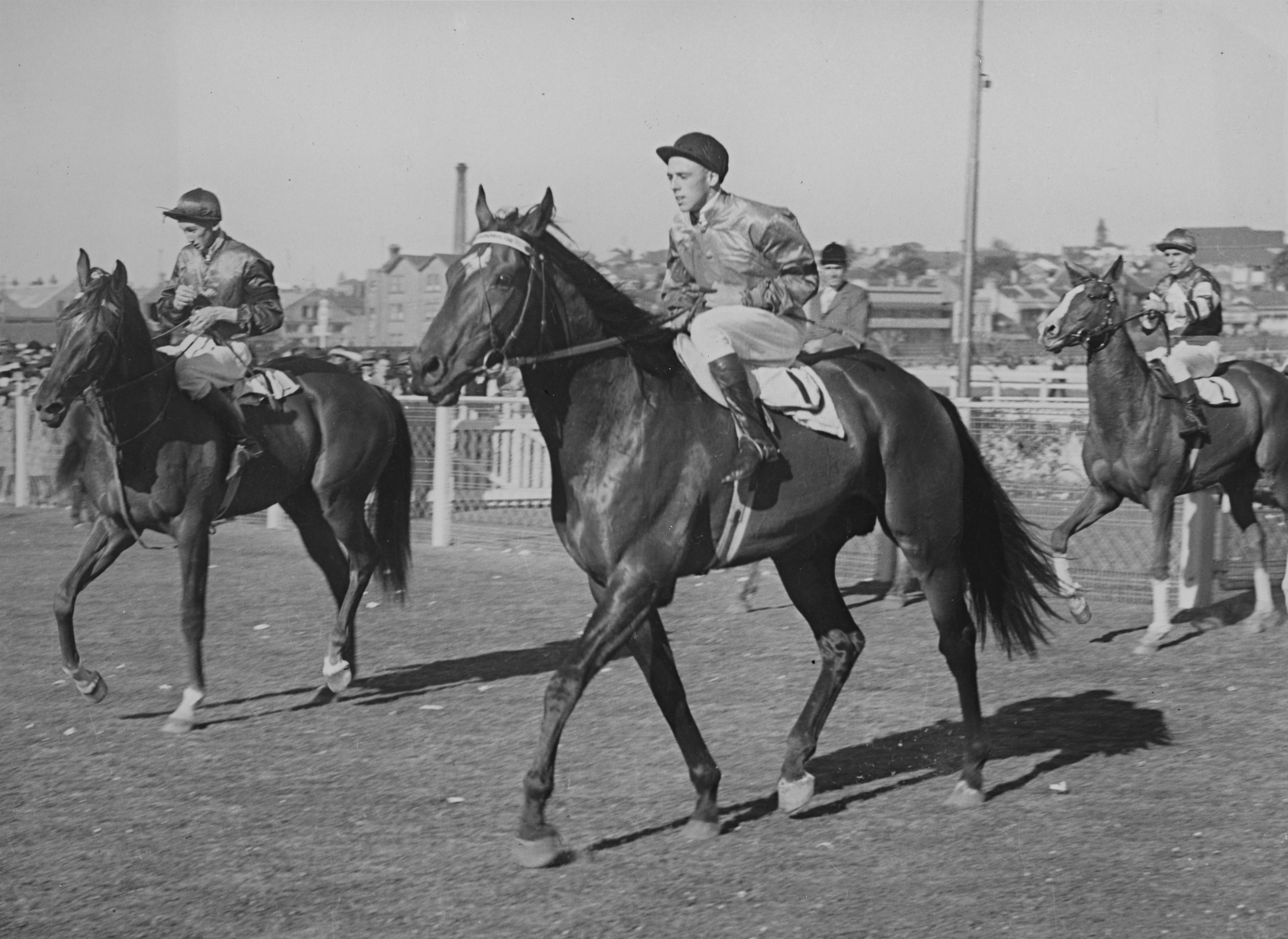
Bernborough, 1946 winner

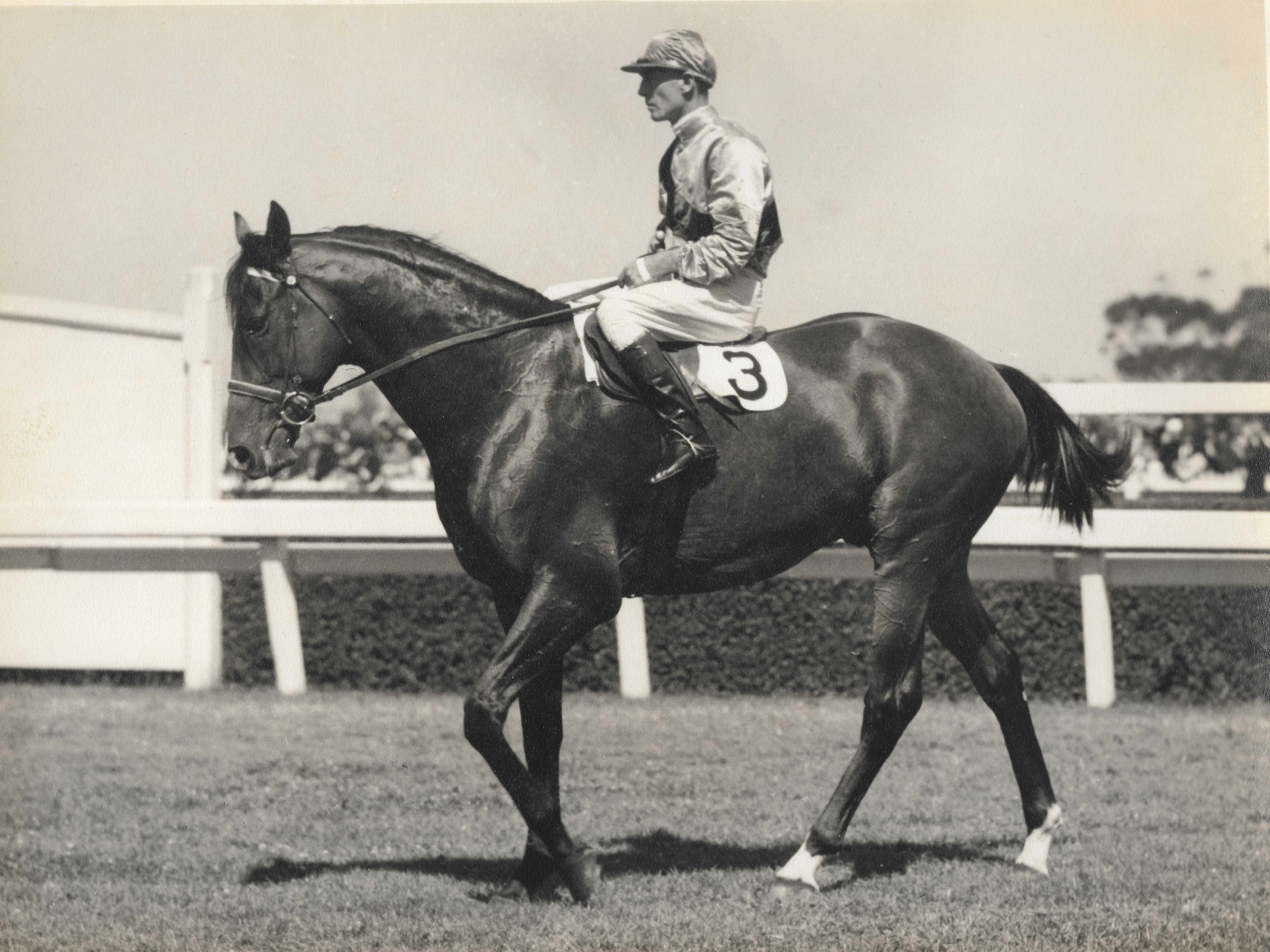
High Caste, 1941 winner

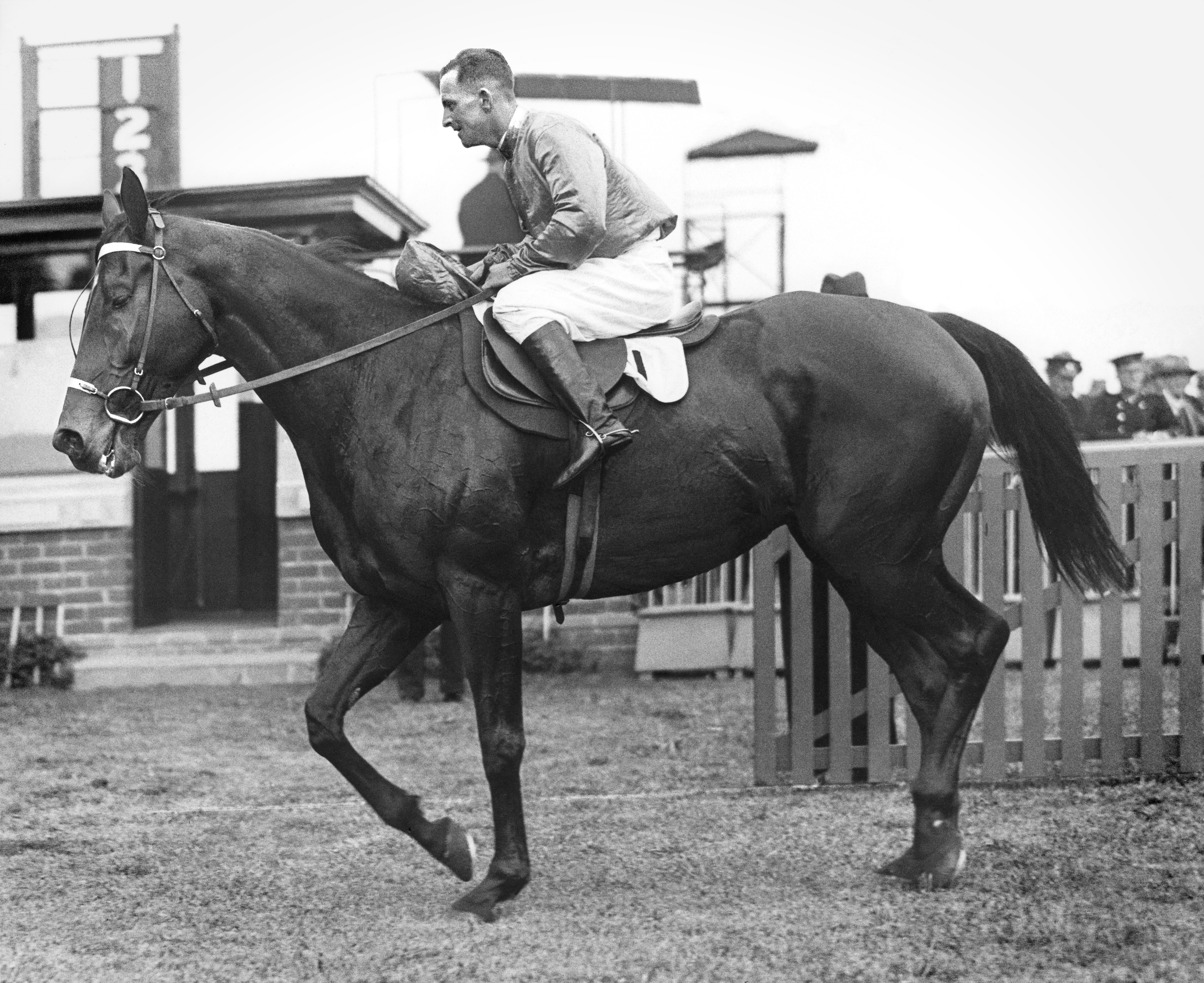
Amounis, 1930 winner

== History ==
=== Name ===
In 2018 the race was renamed to the Winx Stakes, in honour of the champion Australian racehorse.

=== Records ===
- Record time for the 1300 metres was set by Al Mansour (2000) in 1:14.77.
- Jockey Darby Munro won six Warwick Stakes with Rogilla (1935), Allunga (1937), Beaulivre (1940), Katanga (1943), Removal (1945) and Tarien (1954).

=== Distance ===
- 1923–1929 - 7 furlongs
- 1930–1937 - 1 mile
- 1938–1971 - 7 furlongs
- 1972–1999 – 1400 metres
- 2000–2001 – 1300 metres
- 2002 onwards - 1400 metres

=== Grade ===
- Prior to 1978 - Principal race
- 1979–2017 - Group 2
- 2018 onwards - Group 1

The prizemoney has increased significantly. In 2015 the stake was increased from $175,000 to $250,000 and in 2018 to $500,000. The 2022 event was for $750.000 and increased to $1,000,000 the following year.

=== Venue ===
- 1923–1939 - Warwick Farm Racecourse
- 1940–1950 - Randwick Racecourse
- 1951–1992 - Warwick Farm Racecourse
- 1993 - Randwick Racecourse
- 1994–1999 - Warwick Farm Racecourse
- 2000 - Canterbury Park Racecourse
- 2001–2002 - Warwick Farm Racecourse
- 2003 - Randwick Racecourse
- 2004 - Warwick Farm Racecourse
- 2005–2006 - Randwick Racecourse
- 2008 - Warwick Farm Racecourse
- 2009 - Randwick Racecourse
- 2010–2013 - Warwick Farm Racecourse
- 2014 onwards - Randwick Racecourse

=== Gallery of noted winners ===
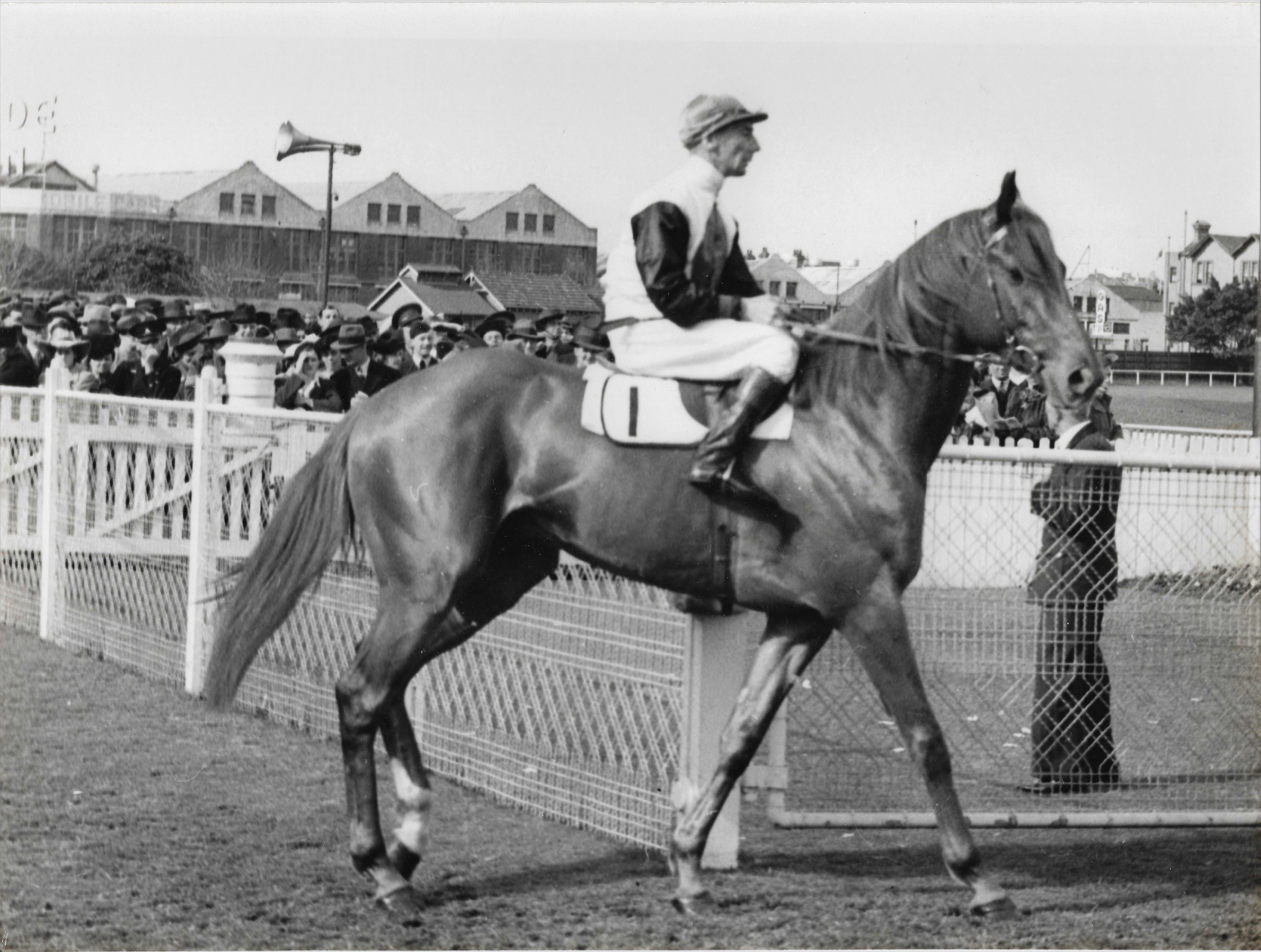
Yaralla, 1942 winner

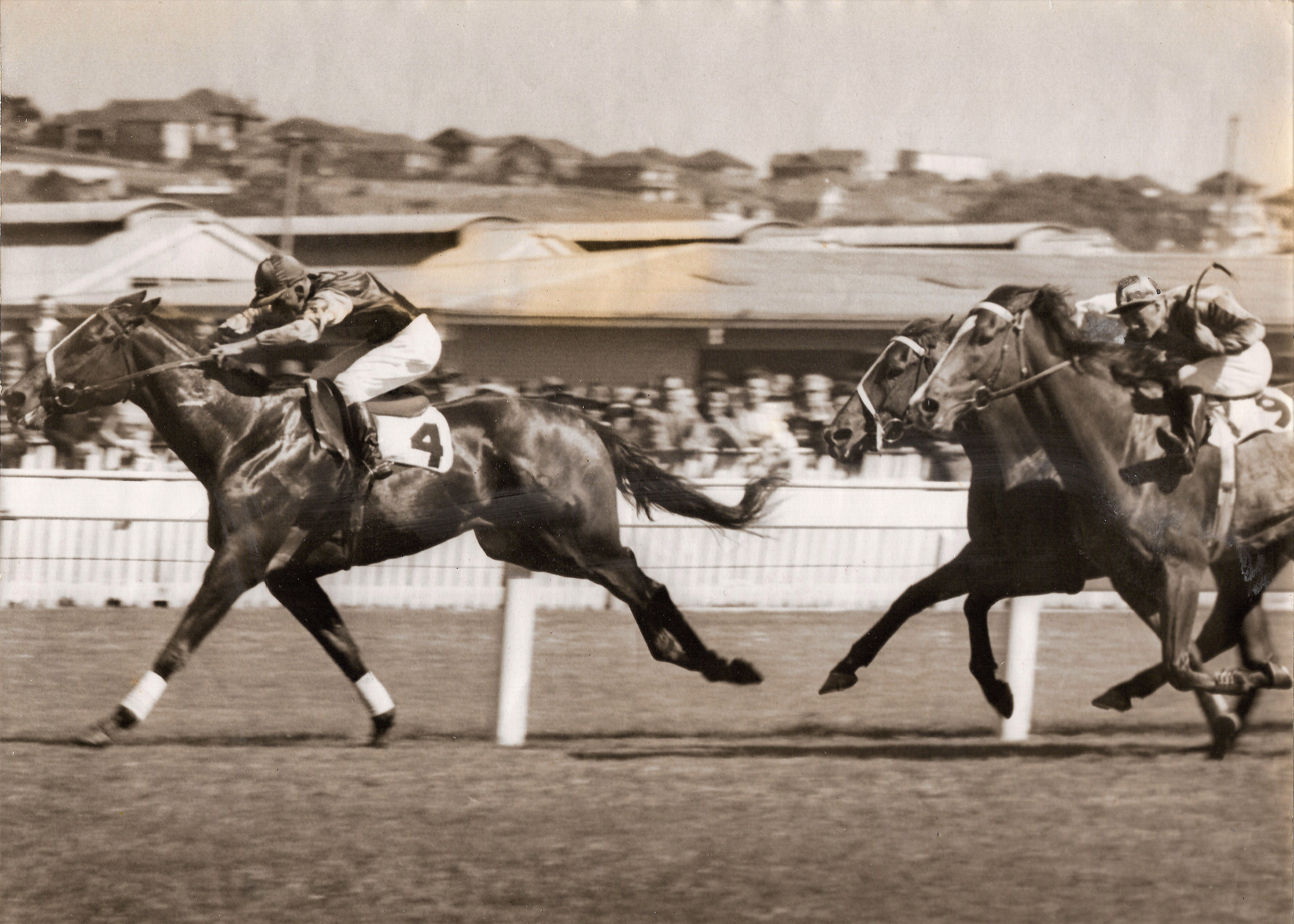
San Domenico, 1950 & 1951 winner

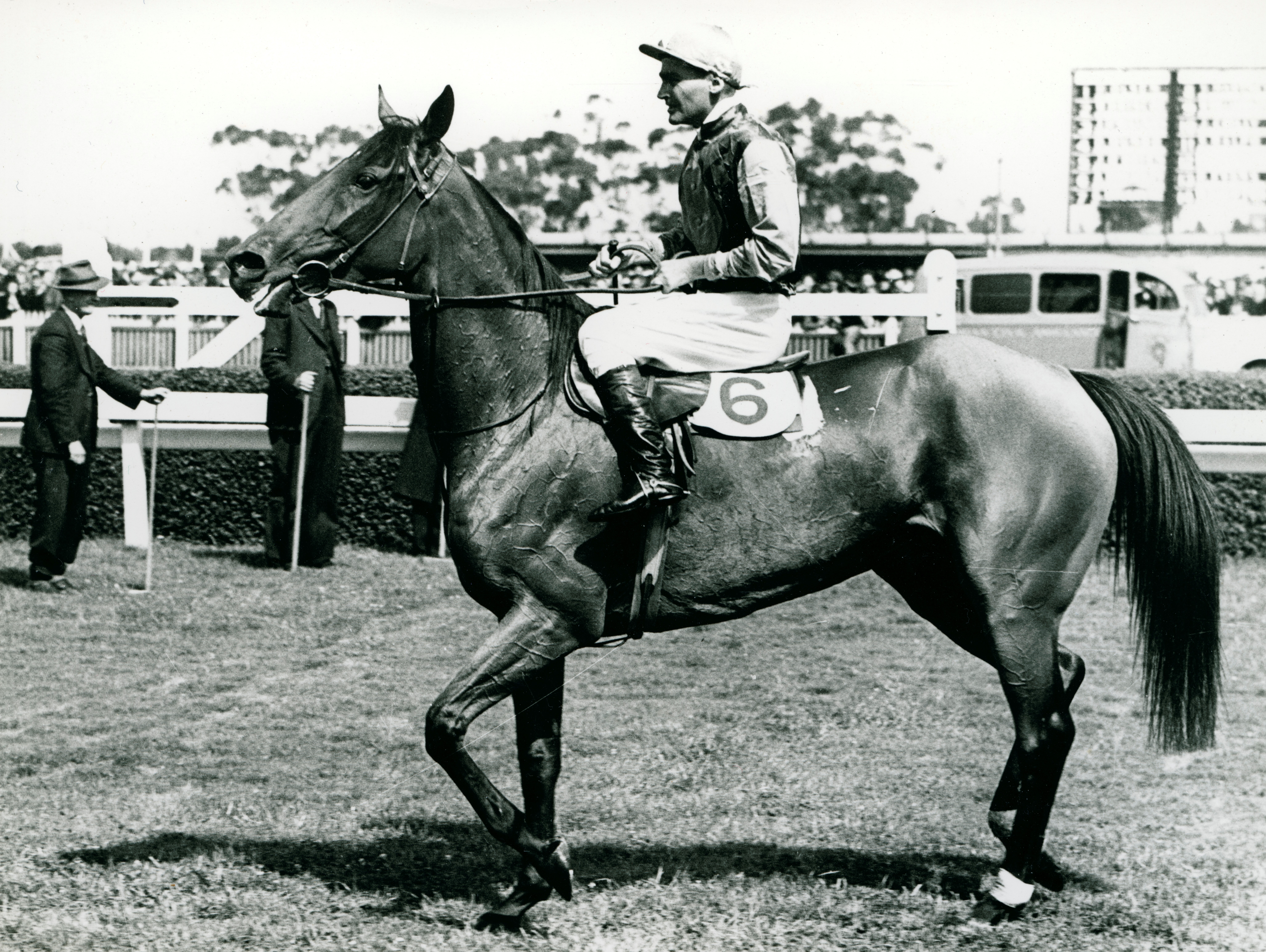
Flight, 1944 winner

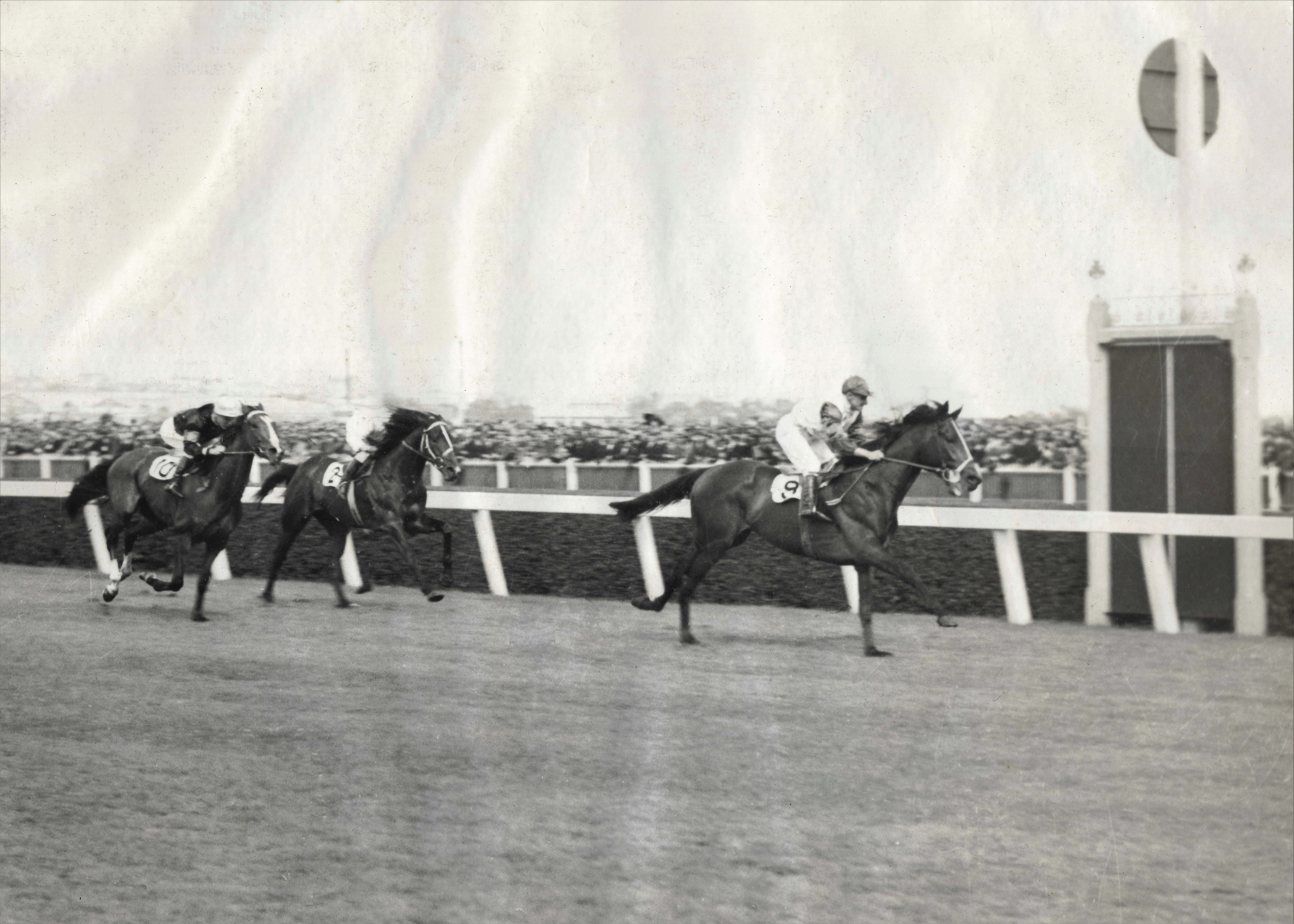
Talking, 1936 winner

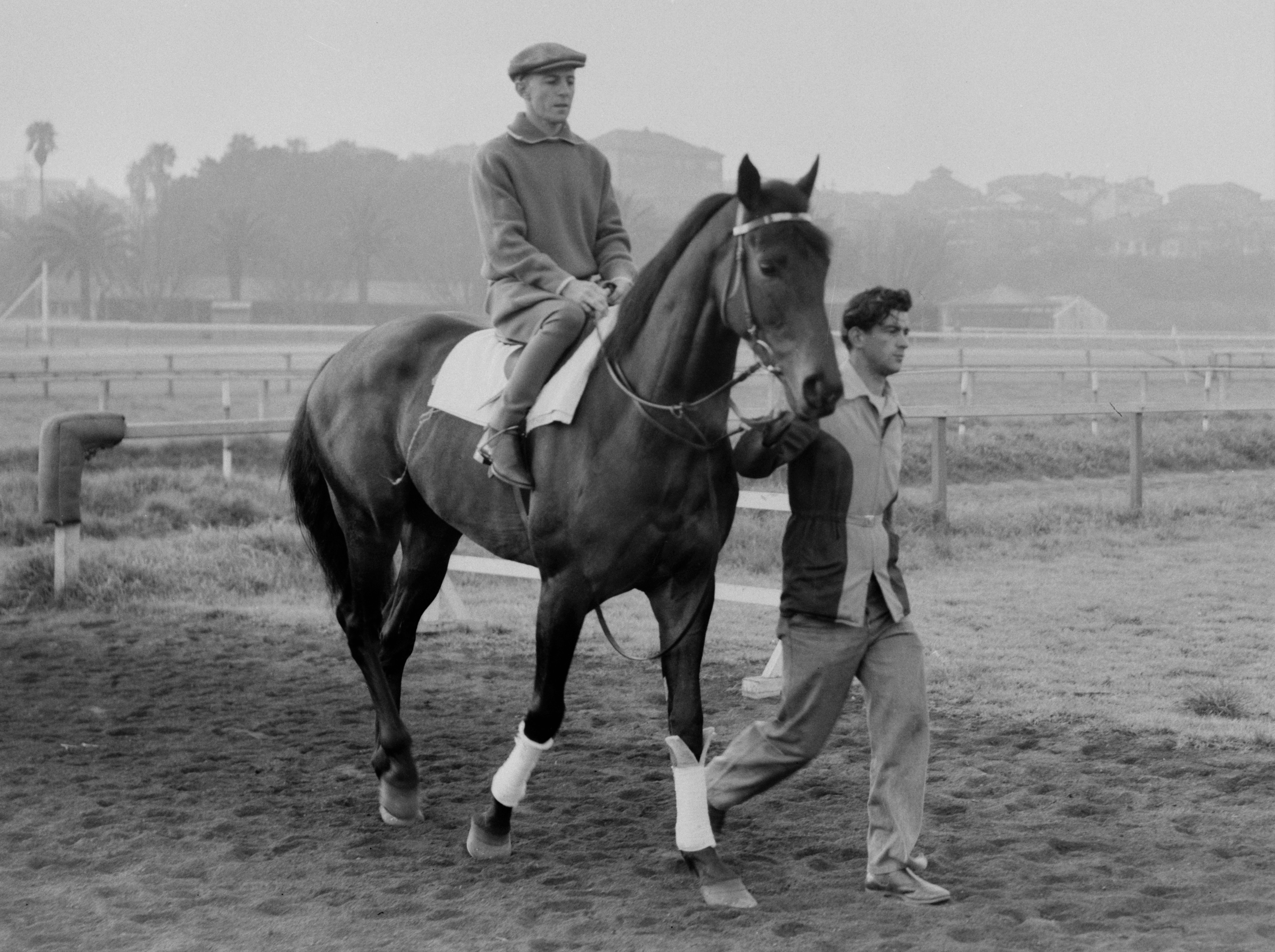
Prince Cortauld, 1955 winner

== 1946 racebook ==
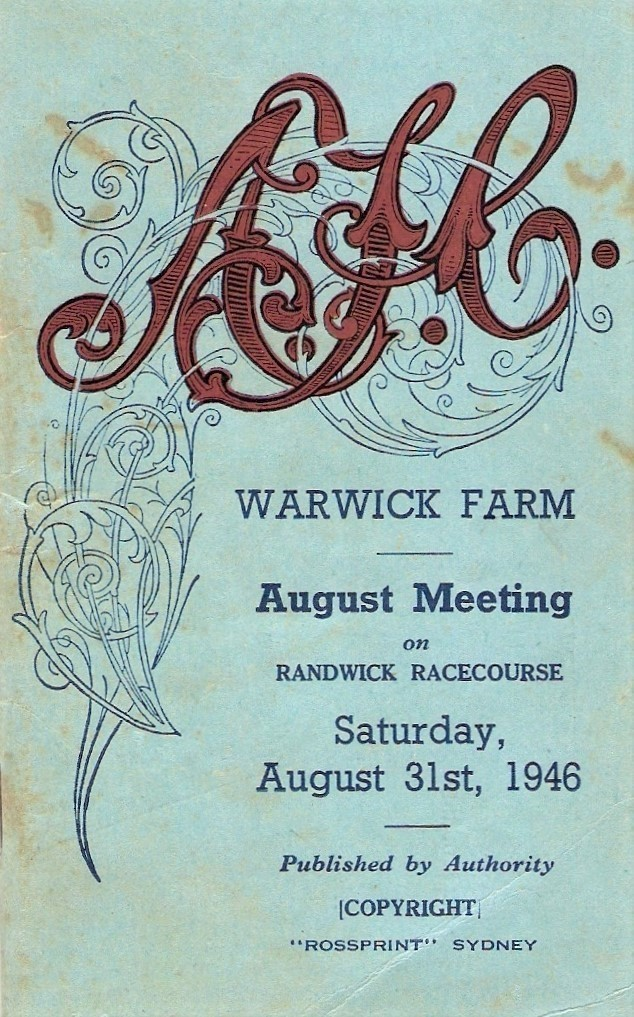
1946 AJC Warwick Stakes racebook front cover

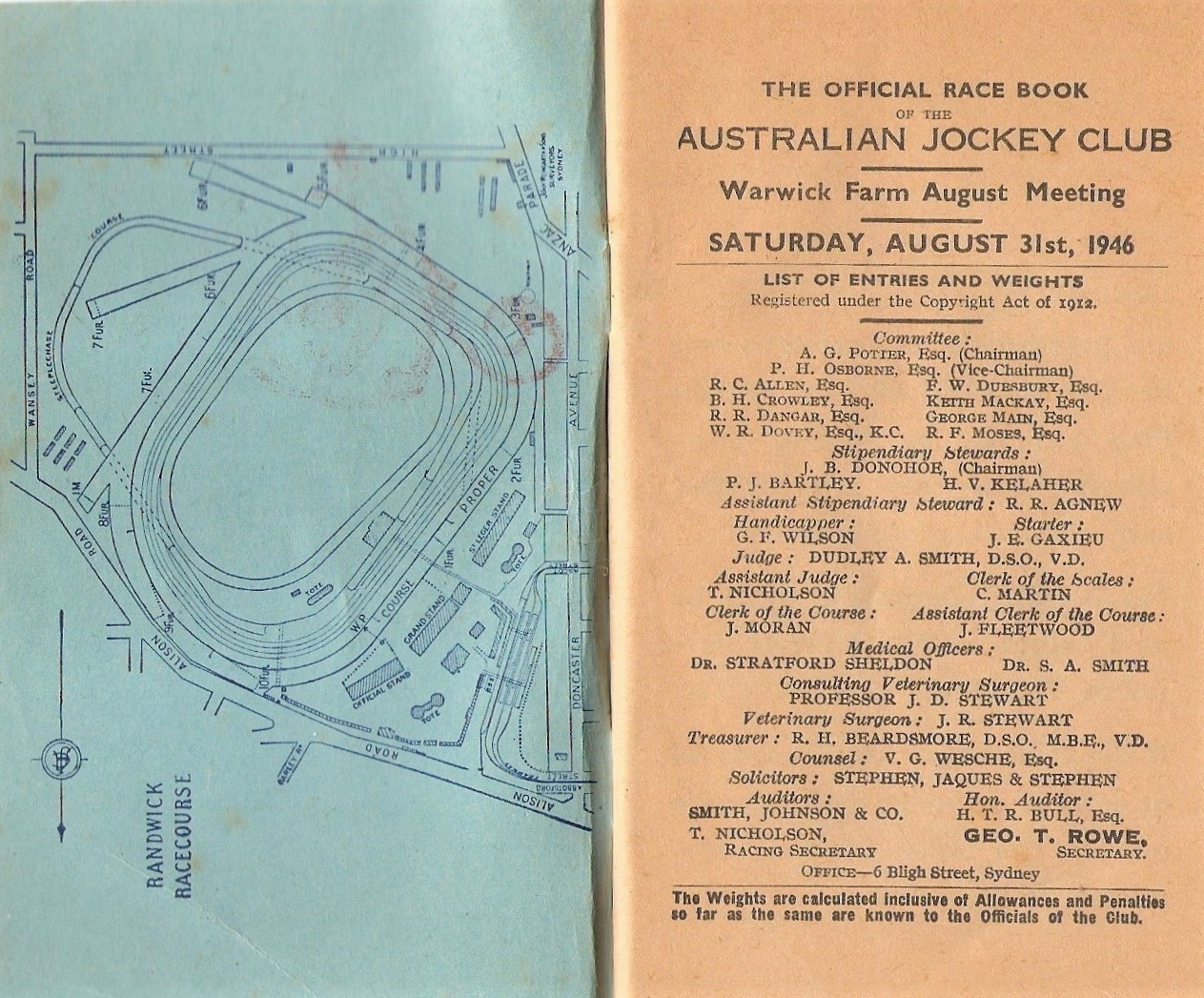
1946 AJC Warwick Stakes showing raceday officials

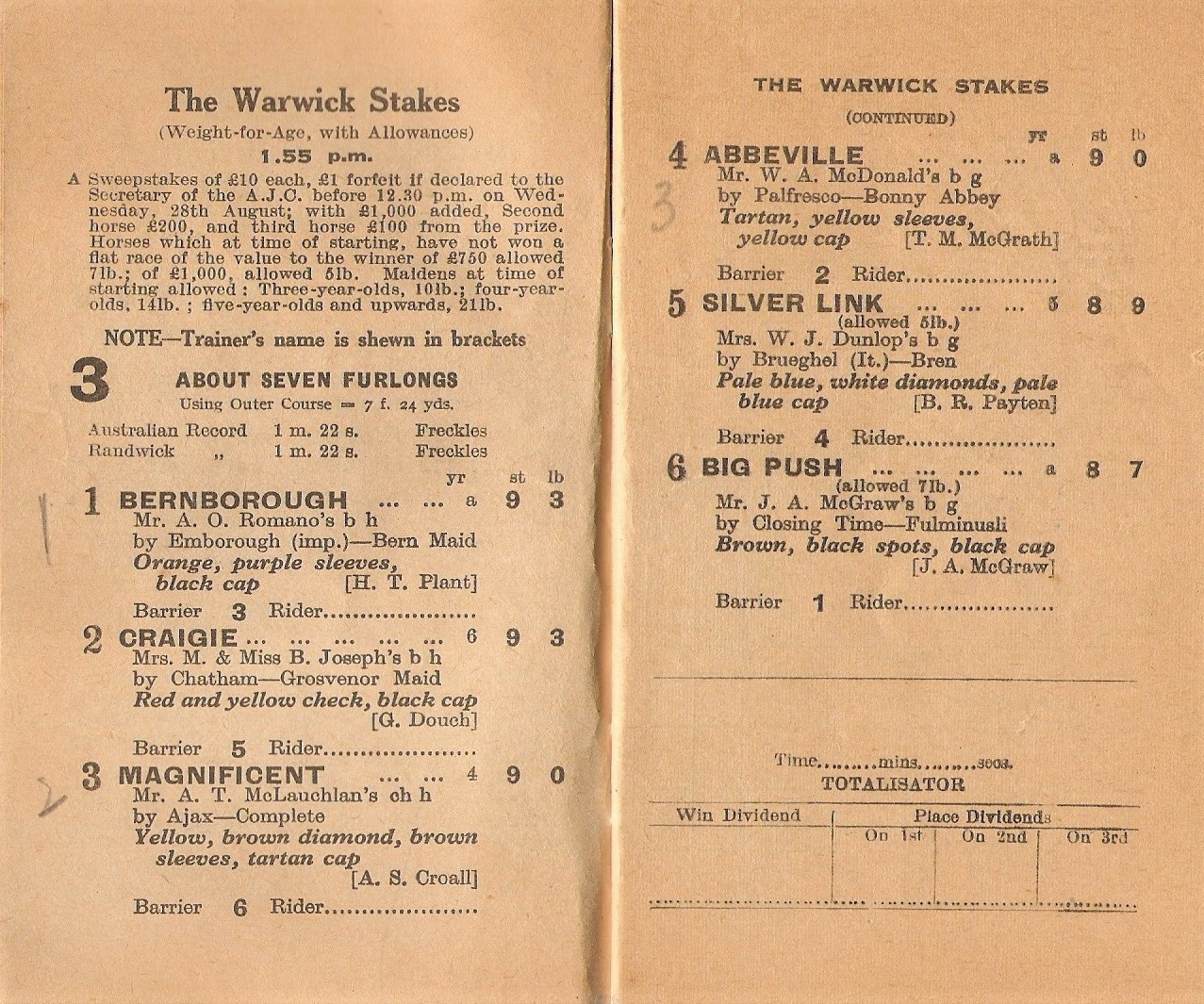
1946 AJC Warwick Stakes showing the winner, Bernborough

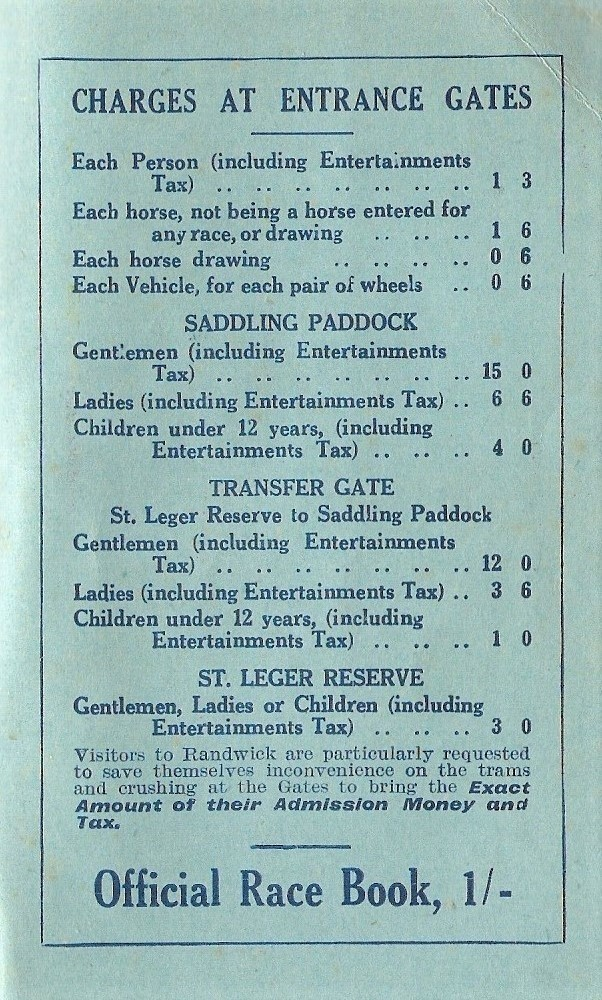
Back cover showing charges at the entrance gates

== Winners ==
The following are past winners of the race.

- 2026 - Autumn Glow
- 2025 - Via Sistina
- 2024 - Via Sistina
- 2023 - Fangirl
- 2022 - Anamoe
- 2021 - Mo'unga
- 2020 - Verry Elleegant
- 2019 - Samadoubt
- 2018 - Winx
- 2017 - Winx
- 2016 - Winx
- 2015 - Royal Descent
- 2014 - Tiger Tees
- 2013 - Veyron
- 2012 - Pinwheel
- 2011 - Pinwheel
- 2010 - Metal Bender
- 2009 - Trusting
- 2008 - Racing To Win
- 2007 - †race not held
- 2006 - Court's In Session
- 2005 - Sir Dex
- 2004 - Private Steer
- 2003 - Lonhro
- 2002 - Defier
- 2001 - Lonhro
- 2000 - Al Mansour
- 1999 - Sunline
- 1998 - What Can I Say
- 1997 - Filante
- 1996 - Filante
- 1995 - Star Dancer
- 1994 - March Hare
- 1993 - Prince Of Praise
- 1992 - Shaftesbury Avenue
- 1991 - Super Impose
- 1990 - Super Impose
- 1989 - Groucho
- 1988 - Flotilla
- 1987 - Pablo's Pulse
- 1986 - Riverdale
- 1985 - Castanillia
- 1984 - Phillip
- 1983 - Yoyangamble
- 1982 - Kingston Town
- 1981 - Kingston Town
- 1980 - Kingston Town
- 1979 - Gypsy Kingdom
- 1978 - Party's Pride
- 1977 - Proficient
- 1976 - Purple Patch
- 1975 - Silver Shadow
- 1974 - Jenarkol
- 1973 - Longfella
- 1972 - Nippon
- 1971 - Ricochet
- 1970 - Royal Show
- 1969 - Fair Law
- 1968 - Swift Peter
- 1967 - Gay Gauntlet
- 1966 - Prince Max
- 1965 - Gay Gauntlet
- 1964 - Reveille
- 1963 - Cele's Image
- 1962 - Sky High
- 1961 - Sky High
- 1960 - Sparkler
- 1959 - Up And Coming
- 1958 - Grey Ghost
- 1957 - Tulloch
- 1956 - El Khobar
- 1955 - Prince Cortauld
- 1954 - Tarien
- 1953 - Tarien
- 1952 - Foreign Exchange
- 1951 - San Domenico
- 1950 - San Domenico
- 1949 - The Groom
- 1948 - Septet
- 1947 - Victory Lad
- 1946 - Bernborough
- 1945 - Removal
- 1944 - Flight
- 1943 - Katanga
- 1942 - Yaralla
- 1941 - High Caste
- 1940 - Beaulivre
- 1939 - Defaulter
- 1938 - Stretto
- 1937 - Allunga
- 1936 - Talking
- 1935 - ‡Rogilla/Silver King
- 1934 - Chatham
- 1933 - Chatham
- 1932 - Johnnie Jason
- 1931 - Johnnie Jason
- 1930 - Amounis
- 1929 - Limerick
- 1928 - Limerick
- 1927 - Limerick
- 1926 - Windbag
- 1925 - Whittier
- 1924 - Glentruin
- 1923 - Sunburst

† Not held because of outbreak of equine influenza
‡ Dead heat

=== Recent multiple winners ===
Trainers

- Chris Waller- 2010, 2015, 2016, 2017, 2018, 2020, 2023, 2024, 2025

Jockeys

- James McDonald- 2020, 2022, 2023, 2025
- Hugh Bowman - 2015, 2016, 2017, 2018
- Kerrin McEvoy - 2011, 2012, 2024

== See also ==
- Premier's Cup (ATC)
- Show County Quality
- Silver Shadow Stakes
- Toy Show Quality
- Winx Guineas
- List of Australian Group races
- Group races
