= Silver Shadow Stakes =

- Class: Group 2
- Location: Randwick Racecourse, Sydney, Australia
- Inaugurated: 1980
- Race type: Thoroughbred
- Sponsor: HKJC World Pool (2026)
- Website: https://www.sintoro.com.au/

Race information
- Distance: 1,200 metres
- Surface: Turf
- Track: Right-handed
- Qualification: Three year old fillies
- Weight: Set weights with penalties
- Purse: $300,000 (2026)

The Silver Shadow Stakes is an Australian Turf Club Group 2 Thoroughbred horse race for three-year-old fillies, run at set weights with penalties, over a distance of 1200 metres at Randwick Racecourse, Sydney, Australia in August.

== History ==
The race is named in honour of the 1975 Warwick Stakes winner Silver Shadow. The race is held on the same racecard as the Warwick Stakes now known as the Winx Stakes.

=== Distance ===
- 1980–1988 – 1200 metres
- 1989 – 1160 metres
- 1990 onwards - 1200 metres

=== Grade ===
- 1980–1992 - Group 3
- 1993–2004 - Group 2
- 2005–2012 - Group 3
- 2013 onwards - Group 2

=== Venue ===
- 1980–1992 - Warwick Farm Racecourse
- 1993 - Randwick Racecourse
- 1994–1999 - Warwick Farm Racecourse
- 2000 - Canterbury Park Racecourse
- 2001–2004 - Warwick Farm Racecourse
- 2005–2006 - Randwick Racecourse
- 2008 onwards - Warwick Farm Racecourse
- 2009 - Randwick Racecourse
- 2010–2013 - Warwick Farm Racecourse
- 2014 onwards - Randwick Racecourse

== Winners ==
The following are past winners of the race.

- 2026 - Pembrey
- 2025 - Savvy Hallie
- 2024 - Ameena
- 2023 - Autumn Ballet
- 2022 - Zougotcha
- 2021 - Swift Witness
- 2020 - Dame Giselle
- 2019 - Libertini
- 2018 - Fiesta
- 2017 - Formality
- 2016 - Omei Sword
- 2015 - Speak Fondly
- 2014 - Bring Me The Maid
- 2013 - Thump
- 2012 - Nechita
- 2011 - Pane In The Glass
- 2010 - Parables
- 2009 - Deer Valley
- 2008 - Samantha Miss
- 2007 - †race not held
- 2006 - Gold Edition
- 2005 - Mnemosyne
- 2004 - Our Sweet Moss
- 2003 - Regimental Gal
- 2002 - Victory Vein
- 2001 - Ha Ha
- 2000 - Ateates
- 1999 - Katima
- 1998 - Crimson Flight
- 1997 - Adeewin
- 1996 - Cashier
- 1995 - Seika
- 1994 - Aragen
- 1993 - Angst
- 1992 - Skating
- 1991 - Pipiwar
- 1990 - Triscay
- 1989 - Spirited Way
- 1988 - Startling Lass
- 1987 - Soda Springs
- 1986 - Diamond Shower
- 1985 - Shankhill Lass
- 1984 - Satin Sand
- 1983 - Purpose
- 1982 - Rosebrook
- 1981 - Black Shoes
- 1980 - Moabite

† Not held because of outbreak of equine influenza

== See also ==
- Premier's Cup (ATC)
- Show County Quality
- Toy Show Quality
- Winx Stakes
- List of Australian Group races
- Group races
