= Toy Show Quality =

- Class: Group 3
- Location: Randwick Racecourse, Sydney, Australia
- Inaugurated: 1995
- Race type: Thoroughbred
- Sponsor: Schweppes (2026)

Race information
- Distance: 1,100 metres
- Surface: Turf
- Track: Right-handed
- Qualification: Horses three years old and older
- Weight: Quality; Minimum weight – 53 kg Maximum weight – 61 kg
- Purse: $250,000 (2026)

The Toy Show Quality is an Australian Turf Club Group 3 Thoroughbred horse race for three-year-old fillies and older mares, run as a quality handicap over a distance of 1100 metres at Randwick Racecourse, Sydney, Australia in August.

== History ==
The race is named in honour of the champion filly Toy Show, who won the 1975 Golden Slipper Stakes, The Thousand Guineas and the 1976 Newmarket Handicap.

=== Distance ===
- 1995–1999 – 1400 metres
- 2000–2001 – 1300 metres
- 2002–2010 – 1400 metres
- 2011–2018 - 1300 metres
- 2019 onwards - 1100 metres

=== Grade ===
- 1995–2012 - Listed race
- 2013 onwards - Group 3

=== Venue ===
- 1995–1996 - Randwick Racecourse
- 1997–1999 - Warwick Farm Racecourse
- 2000 - Canterbury Park Racecourse
- 2001–2004 - Warwick Farm Racecourse
- 2005–2006 - Randwick Racecourse
- 2008 - Warwick Farm Racecourse
- 2009 - Randwick Racecourse
- 2010–2013 - Warwick Farm Racecourse
- 2014 onwards - Randwick Racecourse

== Winners ==
The following are past winners of the race.

- 2026 - Prima Bella
- 2025 - Autumn Glow
- 2024 - Kimochi
- 2023 - Parisal
- 2022 - Zapateo
- 2021 - Fituese
- 2020 - Sweet Deal
- 2019 - Mizzy
- 2018 - Egyptian Symbol
- 2017 - Sweet Redemption
- 2016 - Pearls
- 2015 - Amicus
- 2014 - My Sabeel
- 2013 - Hidden Kisses
- 2012 - Dystopia
- 2011 - Red Tracer
- 2010 - Illuminates
- 2009 - Moti
- 2008 - Kishkat
- 2007 - †race not held
- 2006 - Walk Alone
- 2005 - Nevis
- 2004 - Catreign
- 2003 - Arrabeea
- 2002 - Youhadyourwarning
- 2001 - Winona
- 2000 - Chiming Lass
- 1999 - Fairytales
- 1998 - Sash
- 1997 - Captivating
- 1996 - Macrosa
- 1995 - Joie Denise

† Not held because of outbreak of equine influenza

== See also ==
- Premier's Cup (ATC)
- Show County Quality
- Silver Shadow Stakes
- Winx Stakes
- List of Australian Group races
- Group races
