= Premier's Cup =

Premier's Cup may refer to:

- Premier's Cup (BRC), a Brisbane Racing Club Group 3 Thoroughbred horse race
- Premier's Cup (ATC), an Australian Turf Club Group 3 Thoroughbred quality handicap horse race

== See also ==
- Manchester United Premier Cup, a global youth football tournament
