= Amounis =

Australian-bred Thoroughbred racehorse

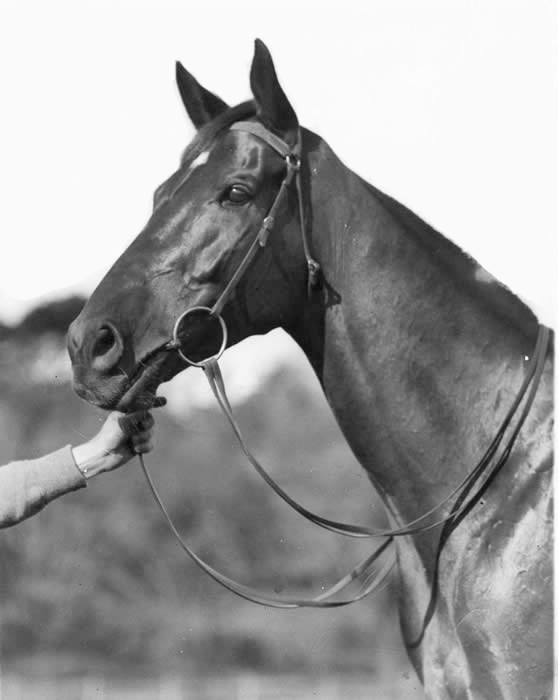
- Sire: Magpie (GB)
- Grandsire: Dark Ronald
- Dam: Loved One
- Damsire: Duke of Melton (GB)
- Sex: Gelding
- Foaled: 1922
- Country: Australia
- Colour: Brown
- Breeder: Percy Miller
- Owner: 1. J.W. Cook; 2. Paddy Wade; 3. William Pearson
- Trainer: J.W. Cook before 8 August 1925, Frank McGrath after 8 August 1925
- Record: 79: 33-11-8
- Earnings: AU £48,297/10/-

Major wins
- Hobartville Stakes (1925); Rosehill Guineas (1925); Epsom Handicap (1926, 1928); Cantala Stakes (1926, 1929); Linlithgow Stakes (1926, 1927, 1929); Chipping Norton Stakes (1927); W. S. Cox Plate (1927); Essendon Stakes (1928, 1930); Tramway Stakes (1928); Craven Plate (1928); Williamstown Cup (1928); Canterbury Stakes (1929); C.B.Fisher Plate (1929); St George Stakes (1930); Futurity Stakes (1930); C M Lloyd Stakes (1930); All Aged Stakes (1930); Warwick Stakes (1930); October Stakes (1930); Caulfield Stakes (1930); Caulfield Cup (1930)

Honours
- Australian Racing Hall of Fame (2006)
- Last updated on 1 September 2009

Amounis was an Australian Thoroughbred Hall of Fame racehorse. He won 33 races over distances ranging from 6 to 12 furlongs (1,200 to 2,400 metres). Of these wins, 27 were in "Principal Races" (equivalent to today's Group races or "Black Type" races), 16 of these races have since been promoted to Group One (G1) status. In winning the AJC Epsom Handicap he established a new Australasian record time.

== Breeding ==
He was a brown gelding bred by Percy Miller and foaled in 1922 at his Kia Ora Stud, Scone, New South Wales. Amounis was by the racehorse and sire, Magpie (GB), his dam Loved One was a racehorse and broodmare by Duke of Melton (GB). Loved One produced 14 foals, of which 8 raced and 5 of these were winners.

== Racing career ==
Amounis was sold as a yearling to a Sydney trainer, J.W. Cook. He started twice as a two-year-old, without success. During a spell (rest) while he was recuperating from a leg injury, he was gelded. Amounis then was sold to Paddy Wade for 2,500 guineas. Wade raced him for a short season when he ran fourth to Manfred in the AJC and Victorian Derbies. Amounis was sold again when Wade left Australia. This time he was purchased by trainer, Frank McGrath on behalf of William Pearson for 1,800 guineas.

As a three-year-old in 1925-26, he started 13 times for 6 wins including the AJC Hobartville Stakes and Rosehill Guineas.

As a four-year-old in 1926-27, he started 12 times for 6 wins including the Epsom Handicap (in Australasian record time), VRC Cantala Stakes, Chipping Norton Stakes, W. S. Cox Plate, and 1926 Linlithgow Stakes.

As a five-year-old in 1927-28, he started 19 times for 3 weight for age (wfa) wins, including the W. S. Cox Plate and 1927 VRC Linlithgow Stakes.

As a six-year-old in 1928-29, he started eight times for four wins including the Craven Plate, AJC Epsom Handicap, Tatt's NSW Tramway Handicap, and WmtnRC Williamstown Cup.

Amounis competed as a seven- and eight-year-old against Phar Lap in great form, as a three- and four-year-old. As a seven-year-old in 1929-30, Amounis started 16 times for 10 wins including the CPRC Canterbury Stakes (with a record weight), VRC CB Fisher Plate, VRC Cantala Stakes, VRC Linlithgow Stakes, Rosehill Stakes, VATC Futurity Stakes, VATC St George Stakes, 1930 VRC C.M. Lloyd Stakes, VRC Essendon Stakes, and 1930 AJC All-Aged Stakes.

As an eight-year-old in 1930-31, he started eight times for four wins including the 1930 Warwick Stakes, VATC Caulfield Cup, carrying 9 st 8 lbs (61 kilograms), VATC Caulfield Stakes, and VRC October Stakes. In the 1930 Warwick Stakes, he defeated Phar Lap by a short head. Before this race, Phar Lap had won nine consecutive races and after it, he scored another 14 consecutive wins.

=== 1930 racebook ===
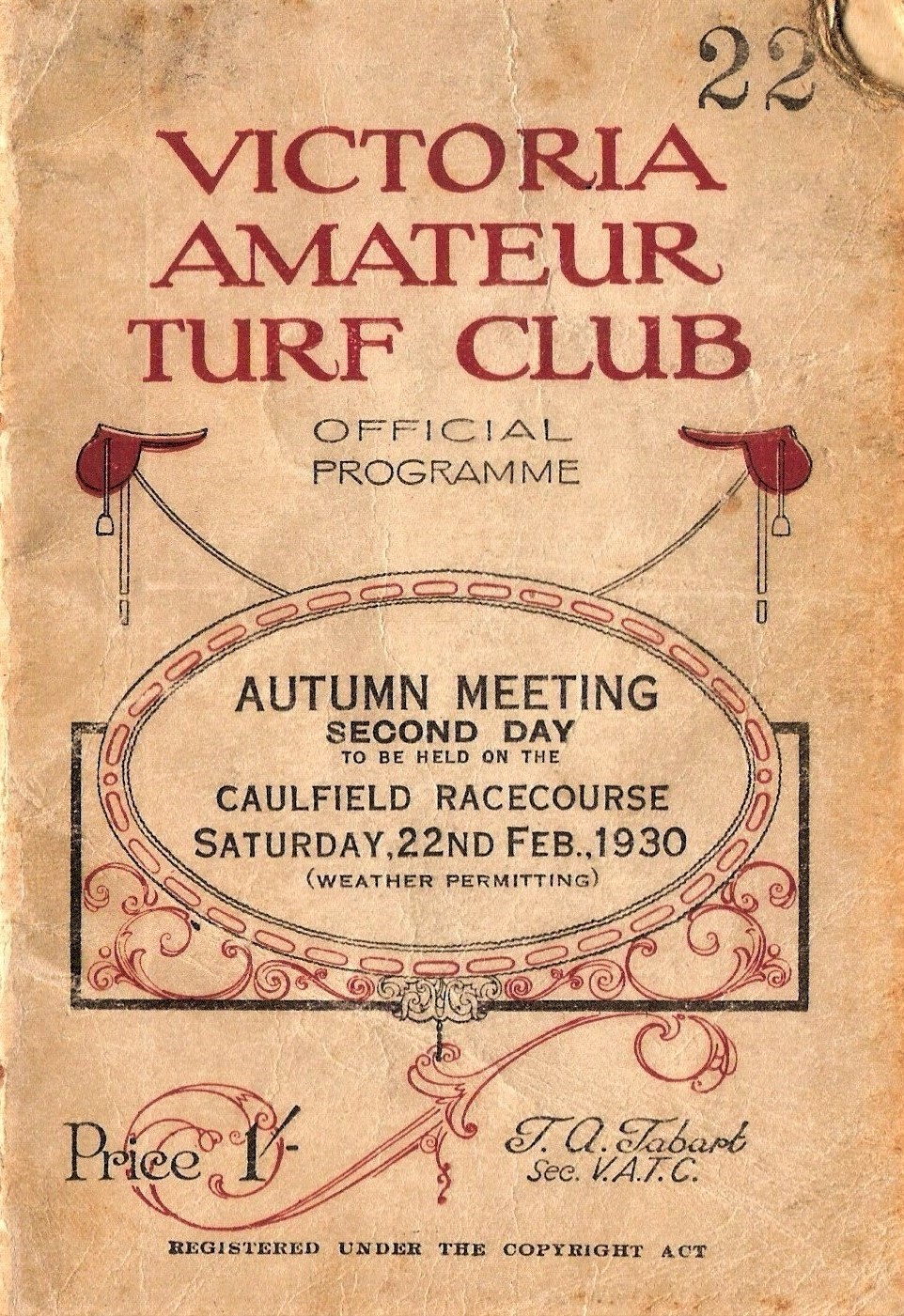
1930 VATC Futurity Stakes racebook front cover

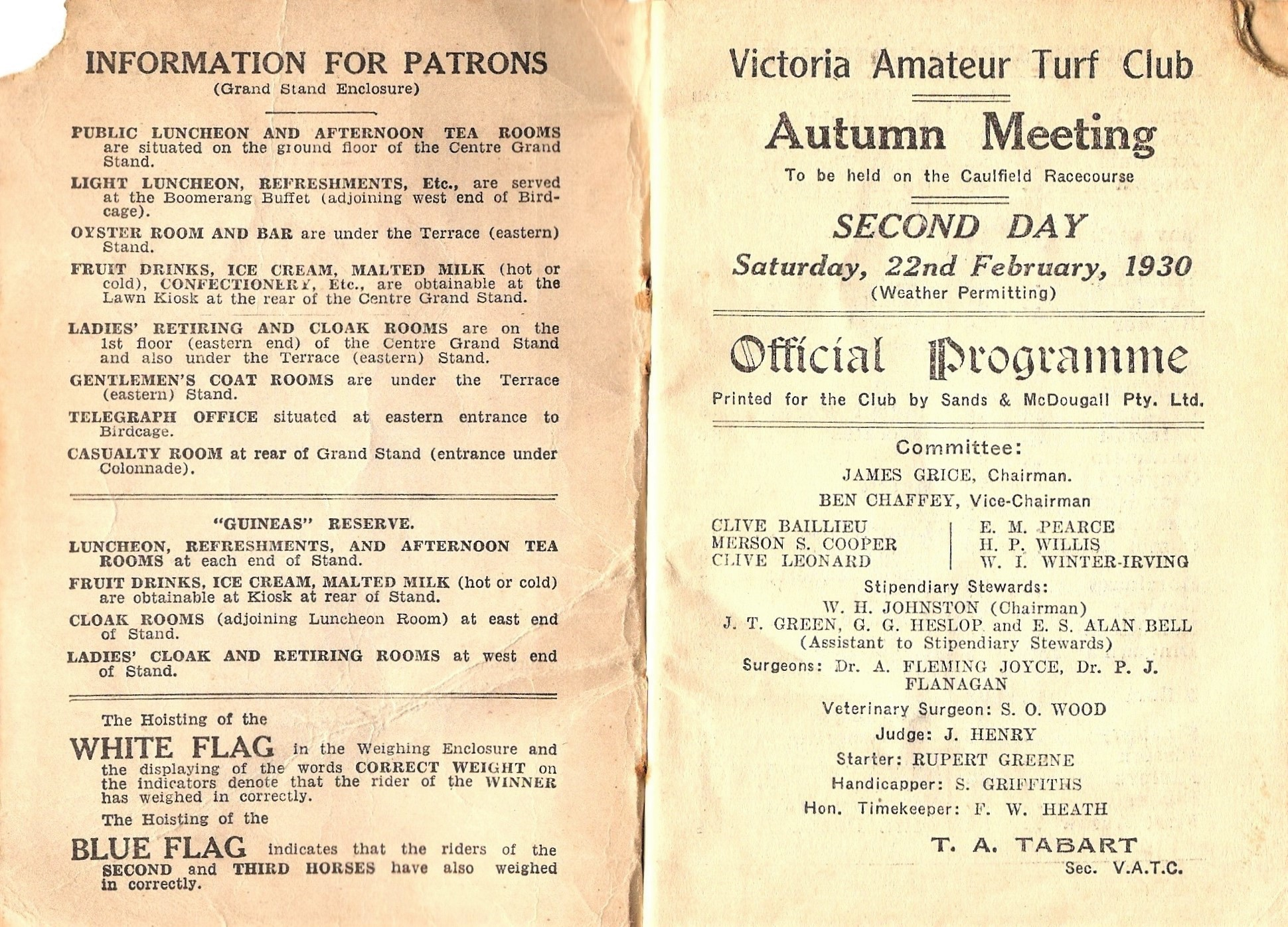
1930 VATC Futurity Stakes showing raceday officials

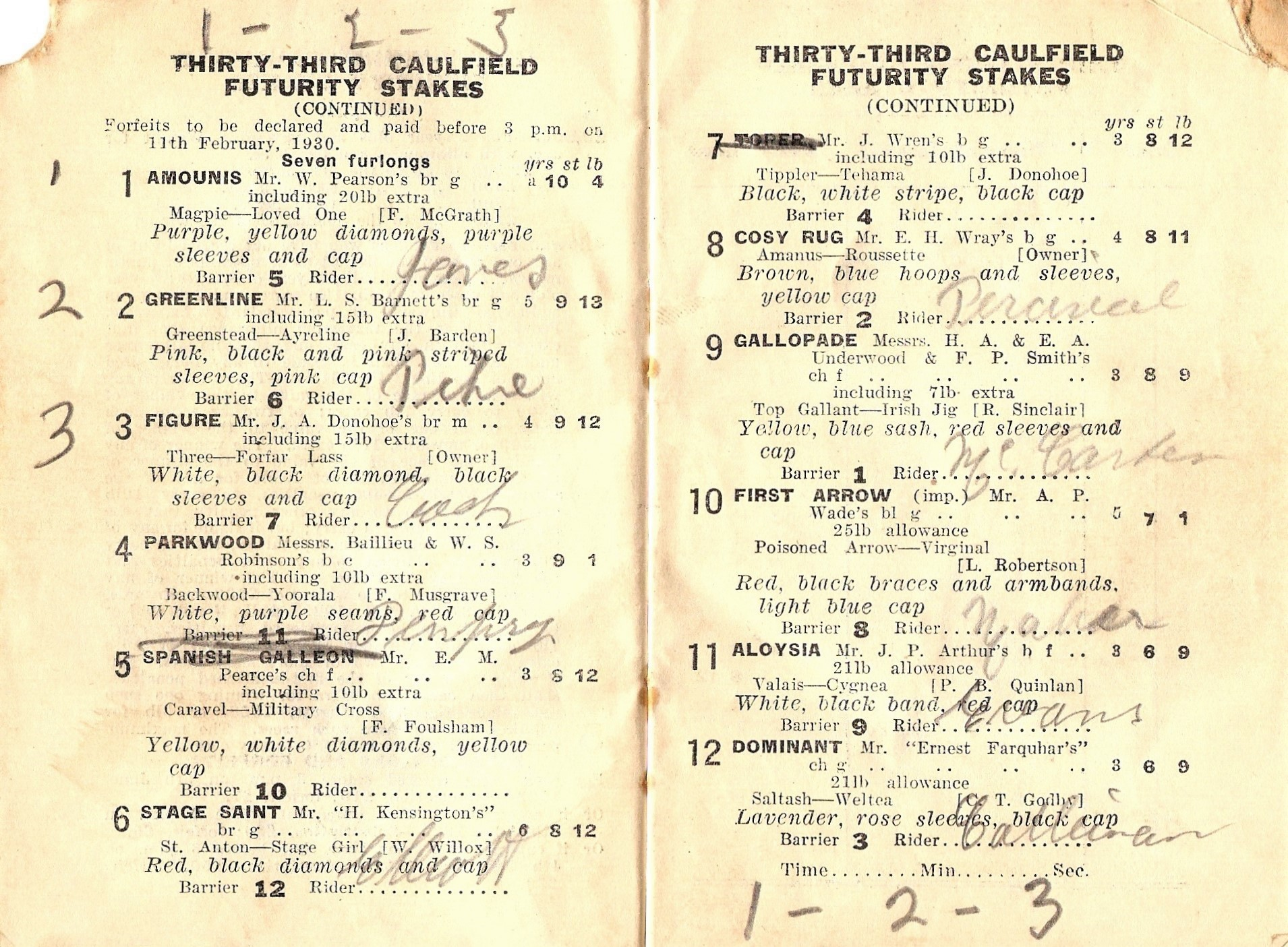
1930 VATC Futurity Stakes showing the winner, Amounis

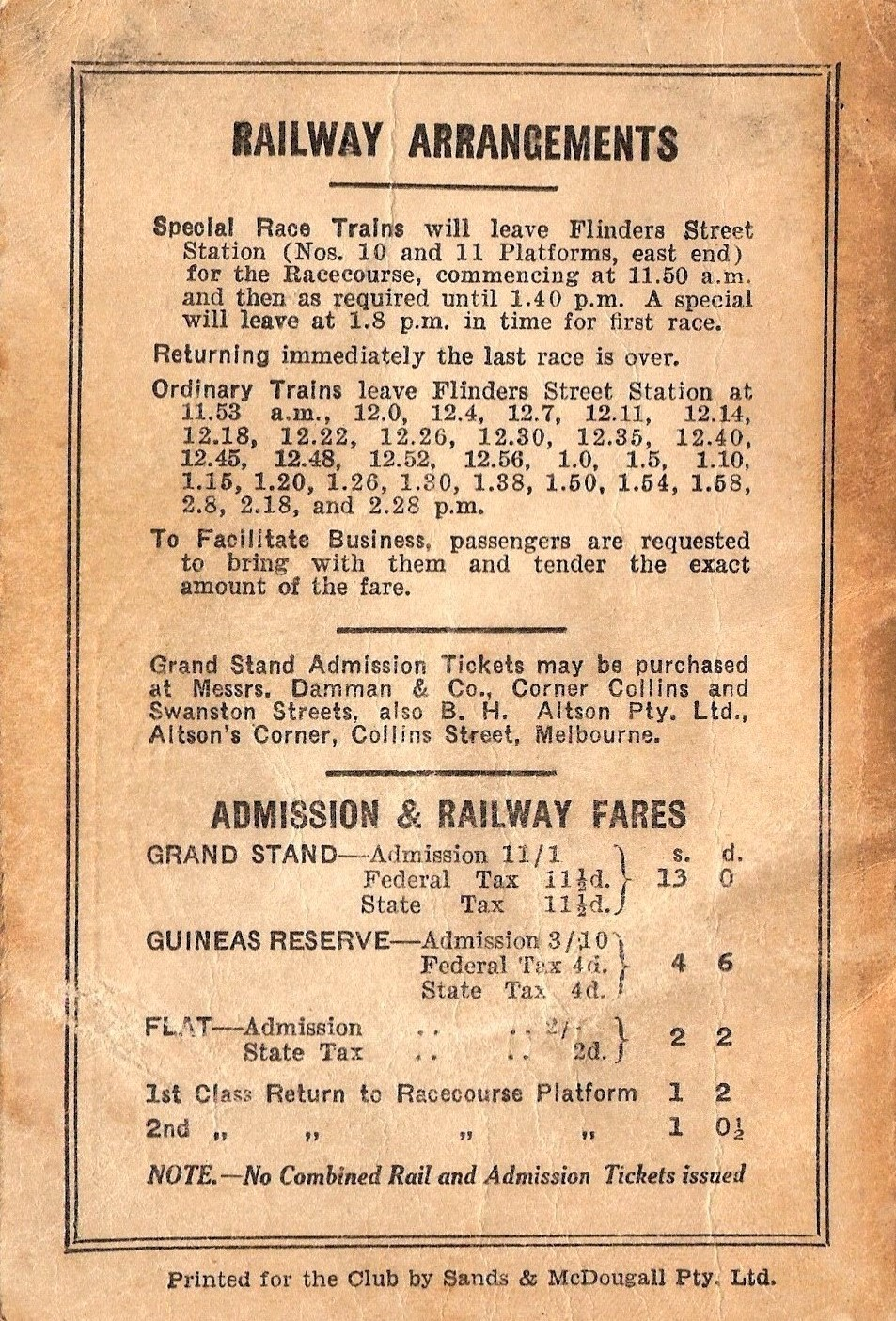
1930 VATC Futurity Stakes showing entrance & railway charges

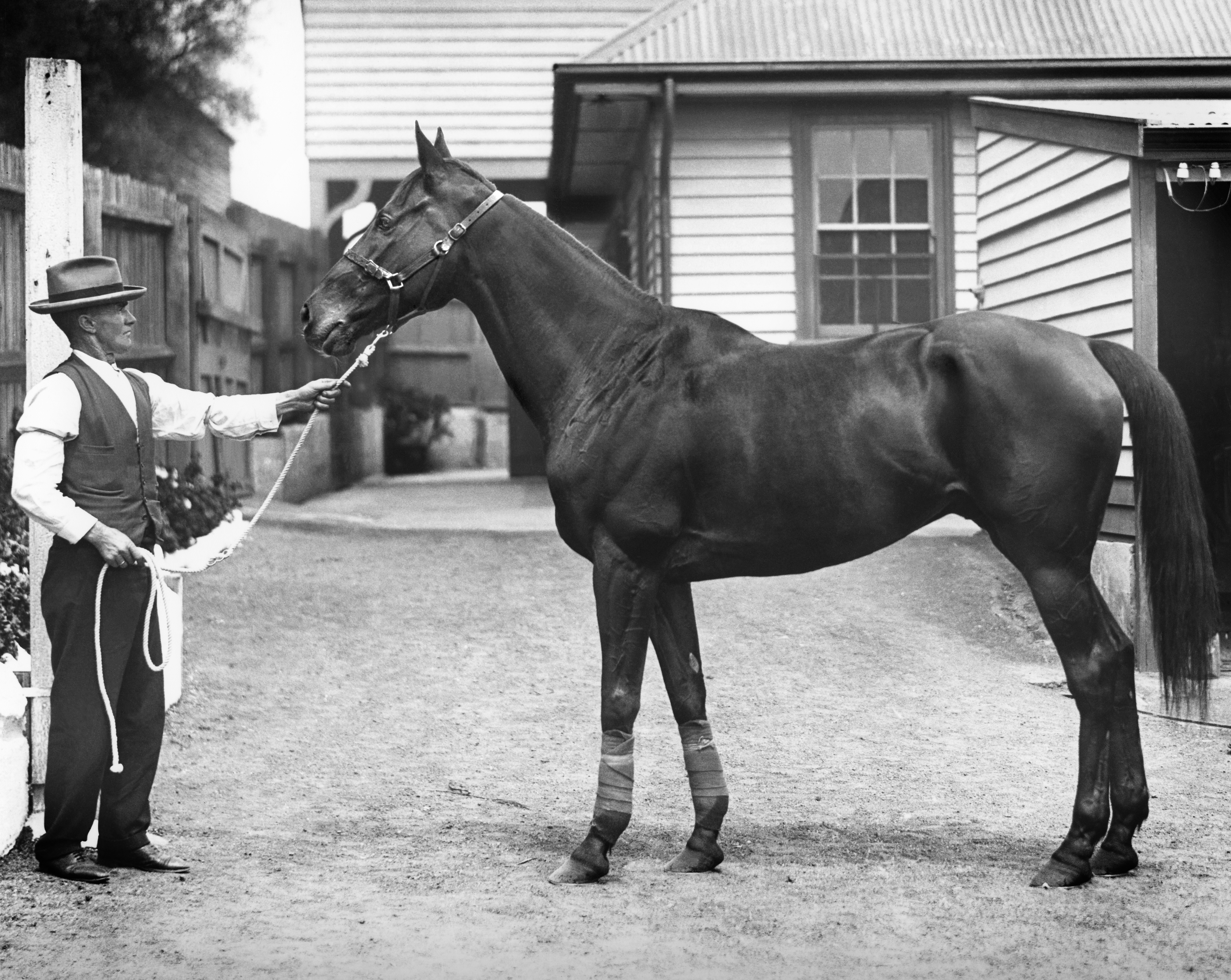
Amounis, 1926 Strapper George Phillips

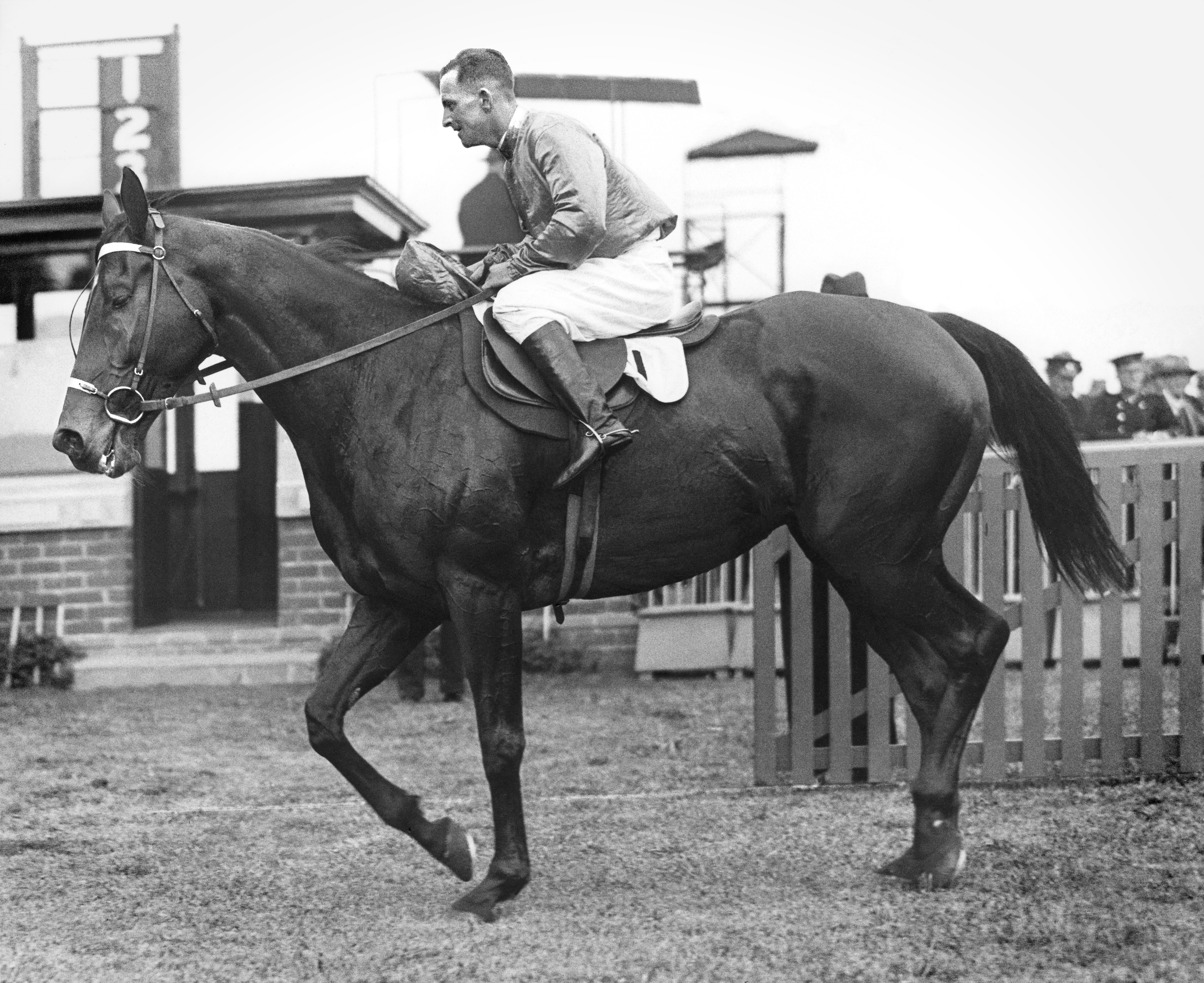
Amounis, 1930 Jockey Harold Jones up

== Race record ==
At two years: 1924-25
Result	Date	Race	Venue	Distance	Weight (st)	Time	Margin	Winner/2nd
Unpl	-	CPRC Juvenile Stakes	Canterbury Park Racecourse	6 furlongs (4,000 ft; 1,200 m)	7.2	1:17	-	Baverlin 1st
Unpl	-	RRC Granville Stakes	Rosehill Racecourse	7 furlongs (4,600 ft; 1,400 m)	7.12	1:27.75	-	Sweet Tress 1st

At three years: 1925-26
Result	Date	Race	Venue	Distance	Weight (st)	Time	Margin	Winner/2nd
Won	-	Moorefield RC Three Year Old Handicap	Moorefield Racecourse	6 furlongs (4,000 ft; 1,200 m)	7.1	1:16.5	2 lengths, 1 lengths	Sunrock 2nd
Won	-	RRC Three Year Old Handicap	Rosehill Racecourse	6 furlongs (4,000 ft; 1,200 m)	7.12	1:14.25	1 1/2 lengths, 1l	Somnolent 2nd
Won	1925	AJC Hobartville Stakes	Randwick Racecourse	7 furlongs (4,600 ft; 1,400 m)	8.10	1:28	1 1/2 lengths, head	Vaals 2nd
Won	1925	RRC Rosehill Guineas	Rosehill Racecourse	9 furlongs (5,900 ft; 1,800 m)	8.5	1:54.5	Neck, 3 lengths	Vaals 2nd
Unpl	1925	AJC Australian Derby	Randwick Racecourse	12 furlongs (7,900 ft; 2,400 m)	8.10	2:35.25	-	Manfred 1st
Unpl	1925	AJC Metropolitan Handicap	Randwick Racecourse	13 furlongs (8,600 ft; 2,600 m)	7.2	-	-	Bard of Avon 1st
Unpl	1925	Victoria Derby	Flemington Racecourse	12 furlongs (7,900 ft; 2,400 m)	8.10	2:31.5	-	Manfred 1st
Won	-	VRC Batman Stakes	Flemington Racecourse	8 furlongs (5,300 ft; 1,600 m)	8.11	1:41	Neck, head	Hampden 2nd
Unpl	-	RRC Railway Handicap	Rosehill Racecourse	7 furlongs (4,600 ft; 1,400 m)	8.5	1:25	-	Lausanne 1st
Unpl	-	AJC Liverpool Handicap	Warwick Farm Racecourse	6 furlongs (4,000 ft; 1,200 m)	8.7	-	-	Robespierre 1st
Unpl	-	AJC Rous Handicap	Randwick Racecourse	7 furlongs (4,600 ft; 1,400 m)	9.13	1:25.75	-	Lovebox 1st
Unpl	-	Newcastle Mile	Broadmeadow Racecourse	8 furlongs (5,300 ft; 1,600 m)	9.5	1:40	-	The Epicure 1st
Won	-	AJC Exeter Handicap	Randwick Racecourse	8 furlongs (5,300 ft; 1,600 m)	10.6	1:40.25	2 lengths, 3/4 lengths	Kalloni 2nd

At four years: 1926-27
Result	Date	Race	Venue	Distance	Weight (st)	Time	Margin	Winner/2nd
Won	-	RRC Dundas Handicap	Rosehill Racecourse	7 furlongs (4,600 ft; 1,400 m)	8.13	1:25	1/2 length, 3 lengths	Fuji San 2nd
Won	1926	AJC Epsom Handicap	Randwick Racecourse	8 furlongs (5,300 ft; 1,600 m)	8.11	1:31.25 (Aust/NZ rec)	3 lengths, 3/4 lengths	Fuji San 2nd
Unpl	-	AJC Craven Plate (wfa)	Randwick Racecourse	10 furlongs (6,600 ft; 2,000 m)	8.11	2:4.25	-	Windbag 1st
Won	1926	VRC Cantala Stakes	Flemington Racecourse	8 furlongs (5,300 ft; 1,600 m)	9.8	1:37.25 (Race rec)	1/2 lengths, long neck	Preposterer 2nd
Won	1926	VRC Linlithgow Stakes (wfa)	Flemington Racecourse	8 furlongs (5,300 ft; 1,600 m)	8.11	1:38.5	2 lengths, 2 lengths	Valicare 2nd
3rd	-	VRC CB Fisher Plate (wfa)	Flemington Racecourse	12 furlongs (7,900 ft; 2,400 m)	8.11	2:36	1 length, 3/4 lengths	Pantheon 1st
Unpl	-	VRC Newmarket Handicap	Flemington Racecourse	6 furlongs (4,000 ft; 1,200 m)	9.13	1:12.5	-	Gothic (GB) 1st
Unpl	-	RRC Rawson Stakes (wfa)	Rosehill Racecourse	9 furlongs (5,900 ft; 1,800 m)	8.11	1:51.25	-	Limerick 1st
Won	-	AJC Chipping Norton Stakes	Warwick Farm Racecourse	10 furlongs (6,600 ft; 2,000 m)	9.4	2:5.5	3/4 length, 1 1/4 lengths	Limerick 2nd
Unpl	-	AJC Doncaster Handicap	Randwick Racecourse	8 furlongs (5,300 ft; 1,600 m)	9.12	1:42.25	-	Don Moon 1st
3rd	-	AJC All Aged Stakes (wfa)	Randwick Racecourse	8 furlongs (5,300 ft; 1,600 m)	8.11	1:38.75	2 lengths, 2 1/2 lengths	Fuji San 1st
Won	-	Murrumbidgee Wagga Gold Cup	Wagga Wagga Racecourse	10 furlongs (6,600 ft; 2,000 m)	10.5	2:5	1 3/4 lengths, 2 lengths	Lady Tattler 2nd

At five years: 1927-28
Result	Date	Race	Venue	Distance	Weight (st)	Time	Margin	Winner/2nd
2nd	-	AJC Warwick Stakes (wfa)	Warwick Farm Racecourse	8 furlongs (5,300 ft; 1,600 m)	9.0	1:38	Head, head	Limerick 1st
3rd	-	RRC Hill Stakes (wfa)	Rosehill Racecourse	8 furlongs (5,300 ft; 1,600 m)	9.0	1:39	2 lengths, 2 lengths	Limerick 1st
Unpl	-	AJC Epsom Handicap	Randwick Racecourse	8 furlongs (5,300 ft; 1,600 m)	9.10	1:38.5	-	Vaals 1st
Unpl	-	AJC Metropolitan	Randwick Racecourse	13 furlongs (8,600 ft; 2,600 m)	9.3	2:53.5	-	Murillo 1st
Won	1927	MVRC W. S. Cox Plate (wfa)	Moonee Valley Racecourse	9 1/2 furlongs (6,300 ft; 1,900 m)	9.1	2:0.5	Nk, 1 length	Avant Courier 2nd
2nd	-	VRC Melbourne Stakes (wfa)	Flemington Racecourse	10 furlongs (6,600 ft; 2,000 m)	9.1	2:5	Head, 1/2 lengths	Silvius (Ire) 1st
Won	1927	VRC Linlithgow Stakes (wfa)	Flemington Racecourse	8 furlongs (5,300 ft; 1,600 m)	8.13	1:38.25	Long neck, 1/2 lengths	Vaals 2nd
2nd	-	VRC CB Fisher Plate (wfa)	Flemington Racecourse	12 furlongs (7,900 ft; 2,400 m)	9.1	2:34.5	2 lengths, 2 1/2 lengths	Silvius (Ire) 1st
3rd	-	Williamstown Cup	Williamstown racecourse	12 furlongs (7,900 ft; 2,400 m)	9.5	2:31	1/2 head, neck	Star d'Or 1st
Unpl	-	AJC Flying Handicap	-	6 furlongs (4,000 ft; 1,200 m)	9.11	1:11.25	-	Killarney 1st
Unpl	-	VATC St George Stakes	Caulfield racecourse	9 furlongs (5,900 ft; 1,800 m)	9.9	1:55.5	-	Black Duchess 1st
Unpl	-	VATC Futurity Stakes	Caulfield racecourse	7 furlongs (4,600 ft; 1,400 m)	10.4	1:26	-	Gothic (GB) 1st
Won	-	VRC Essendon Stakes (wfa)	-	10 furlongs (6,600 ft; 2,000 m)	8.13	2:7.25	3/4 lengths, 1/2 lengths	Spearset 2nd
2nd	-	VRC CM Lloyd Stakes (wfa)	-	8 furlongs (5,300 ft; 1,600 m)	8.12	1:37.25	1 length, 2 lengths	Gothic (GB) 1st
2nd	-	RRC Rawson Stakes (wfa)	Rosehill Racecourse	9 furlongs (5,900 ft; 1,800 m)	8.13	1:53.75	2 lengths, short head	Limerick 1st
Unpl	-	AJC Doncaster Handicap	Randwick Racecourse	8 furlongs (5,300 ft; 1,600 m)	9.10	1:45.25	-	Simeon's Fort (Ire) 1st
Unpl	-	AJC All-Aged Stakes (wfa)	Randwick Racecourse	8 furlongs (5,300 ft; 1,600 m)	8.12	1:39.25	-	Limerick 1st
Unpl	-	AJC King's Cup	Randwick Racecourse	12 furlongs (7,900 ft; 2,400 m)	8.9	2:32.5	-	Limerick 1st
Unpl	-	Murrumbidgee Wagga Gold Cup	Wagga Wagga	10 furlongs (6,600 ft; 2,000 m)	10.0	2:5.8	-	Charlot 1st

At six years: 1928-29
Result	Date	Race	Venue	Distance	Weight (st)	Time	Margin	Winner/2nd
Won	-	Tatts Club (NSW) Tramway Handicap	-	7 furlongs (4,600 ft; 1,400 m)	9.4	1:2.25	Head, length	Habashow 2nd
Won	-	AJC Epsom Handicap	-	8 furlongs (5,300 ft; 1,600 m)	9.7	1:37.25	1/2 length, 1 1/2 lengths	Sion 2nd
Won	-	AJC Craven Plate (wfa)	-	10 furlongs (6,600 ft; 2,000 m)	9.1	2:26.25	1 1/2 length, 1 1/2 lengths	Fourth Hand 2nd
2nd	-	VATC Caulfield Stakes (wfa)	-	9 furlongs (5,900 ft; 1,800 m)	9.1	1:53	1 length, 3 lengths	Gothic (GB) 1st
Unpl	-	MVRC W. S. Cox Plate (wfa)	-	9 1/2 furlongs (6,300 ft; 1,900 m)	9.1	1:6.75	-	Highland 1st
2nd	-	VRC Melbourne Stakes (wfa)	-	10 furlongs (6,600 ft; 2,000 m)	9.0	2:8.75	Long neck, 3/4 lengths	Gothic (GB) 1st
2nd	-	VRC Linlithgow Stakes (wfa)	-	8 furlongs (5,300 ft; 1,600 m)	8.13	1:38.75	1 1/2 length, 1/2 head	Gothic (GB) 1st
Won	-	Williamstown Cup	-	12 furlongs (7,900 ft; 2,400 m)	9.5	2:32.5	3/4 length, 1 1/2 lengths	Bombard 2nd

At seven years: 1929-30
Result	Date	Race	Venue	Distance	Weight (st)	Time	Margin	Winner/2nd
Won	-	CPRC Canterbury Stakes	-	6 furlongs (4,000 ft; 1,200 m)	9.6	1:13	Short head, 3/4 lengths	Paganelli 2nd
Unpl	-	RRC Hill Stakes (wfa)	-	8 furlongs (5,300 ft; 1,600 m)	9.0	1:38.5	-	Winalot 1st
3rd	-	AJC Spring Stakes (wfa)	-	12 furlongs (7,900 ft; 2,400 m)	9.3	2:30.75	2 lengths, 3 lengths	Winalot 1st
3rd	-	AJC Craven Plate (wfa)	-	10 furlongs (6,600 ft; 2,000 m)	9.1	2:11.25	4 lengths, 10 lengths	Phar Lap 1st
2nd	-	VATC Caulfield Cup	-	12 furlongs (7,900 ft; 2,400 m)	9.5	2:30.5	2 lengths, 1 1/2 lengths	High Syce 1st
Won	-	VRC Cantala Stakes	-	8 furlongs (5,300 ft; 1,600 m)	9.12	1:38.25	3/4 lengths, 1 1/4 lengths	Merab 2nd
Won	-	VRC Linlithgow Stakes (wfa)	-	8 furlongs (5,300 ft; 1,600 m)	8.13	1:36.25	1 length, 1 1/4 lengths	Highland 2nd
Won	-	VRC CB Fisher Plate (wfa)	-	12 furlongs (7,900 ft; 2,400 m)	9.2	2:30.75	1 3/4 lengths, 2 1/3 lengths	High Syce 2nd
Won	-	RRC Rosehill Stakes	-	8 furlongs (5,300 ft; 1,600 m)	9.9	1:39	2 1/2 lengths, 2 1/4 lengths	Gay Ballerina 2nd
Won	-	VATC St George Stakes	-	9 furlongs (5,900 ft; 1,800 m)	9.9	1:53.75	1/2 lengths, neck	Parsee 2nd
Won	-	VATC Futurity Stakes	-	7 furlongs (4,600 ft; 1,400 m)	10.4	1:27.75	1 length, neck	Greenline 2nd
Won	-	VRC Essendon Stakes (wfa)	-	10 furlongs (6,600 ft; 2,000 m)	8.13	2:4.75	1 1/2 lengths, 6 lengths	High Syce 2nd
Won	-	VRC CM Lloyd Stakes (wfa)	-	8 furlongs (5,300 ft; 1,600 m)	8.13	1:38.5	1 length, 3 1/2 lengths	Greenline 2nd
2nd	-	AJC Chipping Norton Stakes (wfa)	-	10 furlongs (6,600 ft; 2,000 m)	9.6	2:6	2 lengths, neck	Phar Lap 1st
2nd	-	AJC Autumn Stakes (wfa)	-	12 furlongs (7,900 ft; 2,400 m)	9.0	2:33.25	Short head, 1/2 lengths	Nightmarch 1st
Won	-	AJC All-Aged Stakes (wfa)	-	8 furlongs (5,300 ft; 1,600 m)	8.12	1:37	1 length, 3/4 lengths	Nightmarch 2nd

At eight years: 1930-31
Result	Date	Race	Venue	Distance	Weight (st)	Time	Margin	Winner/2nd
Won	-	AJC Warwick Stakes (wfa)	-	8 furlongs (5,300 ft; 1,600 m)	9.0	1:38	Short head, 3 lengths	Phar Lap 2nd
2nd	-	VATC Memsie Stakes	-	9 furlongs (5,900 ft; 1,800 m)	9.8	1:54.25	1/2 head, 3 lengths	Wise Force 1st
Unpl	-	VRC Quality Handicap	-	7f 50yds	9.0	1:29.5	-	Wise Force 1st
Won	-	VRC October Stakes (wfa)	-	8 furlongs (5,300 ft; 1,600 m)	9.0	1:37.25	1 length, 5 lengths	Rigadoon 2nd
Won	-	VATC Caulfield Stakes (wfa)	-	9 furlongs (5,900 ft; 1,800 m)	9.1	1:55.25	1/2 length, 3/4 lengths	Carradale 2nd
Won	-	VATC Caulfield Cup	-	12 furlongs (7,900 ft; 2,400 m)	9.8	2:34.25	1/2 length, 2 lengths	Solution 2nd
3rd	-	VATC Melbourne Stakes (wfa)	-	10 furlongs (6,600 ft; 2,000 m)	9.0	2:4.5	3 lengths, 4 lengths	Phar Lap 1st
Unpl	-	VRC Linlithgow Stakes (wfa)	-	8 furlongs (5,300 ft; 1,600 m)	8.13	1:37	-	Phar Lap 1st

At nine years: 1931-32 Did not race

At ten years: 1932-33
Result	Date	Race	Venue	Distance	Weight (st)	Time	Jockey	Winner/2nd
Unpl	-	AJC Warwick Stakes (wfa)	-	8 furlongs (5,300 ft; 1,600 m)	9.0	-	-	Johnnie Jason 1st

== Pedigree ==
Pedigree of Amounis (AUS), brown gelding, 1922
Sire Magpie (GB) 1914	Dark Ronald (GB); 1905	Bay Ronald (GB)	Hampton (GB)*
Sire Magpie (GB) 1914	Dark Ronald (GB); 1905	Bay Ronald (GB)	Black Duchess (GB)
Sire Magpie (GB) 1914	Dark Ronald (GB); 1905	Darkie (GB)	Thurio (GB)
Sire Magpie (GB) 1914	Dark Ronald (GB); 1905	Darkie (GB)	Insignia (GB)
Sire Magpie (GB) 1914	Popinjay (GB); 1905	St Frusquin (GB)	St Simon (GB)
Sire Magpie (GB) 1914	Popinjay (GB); 1905	St Frusquin (GB)	Isabel (GB)
Sire Magpie (GB) 1914	Popinjay (GB); 1905	Chelandry (GB)	Goldfinch (GB)
Sire Magpie (GB) 1914	Popinjay (GB); 1905	Chelandry (GB)	Illuminata (GB)
Dam Loved One (Aus) 1912	Duke of Melton (GB); 1903	Melton (GB)	Master Kildare (GB)
Dam Loved One (Aus) 1912	Duke of Melton (GB); 1903	Melton (GB)	Violet Melrose (GB)
Dam Loved One (Aus) 1912	Duke of Melton (GB); 1903	La Petite Duchess (GB)	Endurance (GB)
Dam Loved One (Aus) 1912	Duke of Melton (GB); 1903	La Petite Duchess (GB)	Cherry Duchess (GB)
Dam Loved One (Aus) 1912	Bul Bul (Aus); 1906	Simile (GB)	St Simon (GB)
Dam Loved One (Aus) 1912	Bul Bul (Aus); 1906	Simile (GB)	Mimi (GB)
Dam Loved One (Aus) 1912	Bul Bul (Aus); 1906	Chand Beebee (GB)	Royal Hampton (GB)*
Dam Loved One (Aus) 1912	Bul Bul (Aus); 1906	Chand Beebee (GB)	Missy Baba (GB) (Family: 5)

* Amounis is inbred 4S x 4D to the stallion St Simon, meaning that he appears fourth generation on the sire side of his pedigree, and fourth generation on the dam side of his pedigree.

* Amounis is inbred 4S x 5D to the stallion Hampton, meaning that he appears fourth generation on the sire side of his pedigree, and fifth generation (via Royal Hampton) on the dam side of his pedigree.

== See also ==
- Glossary of Australian and New Zealand punting
