= Avilius (horse) =

British-bred Thoroughbred racehorse

- Sire: Pivotal (GB)
- Grandsire: Polar Falcon (USA)
- Dam: Alessandria (GB)
- Damsire: Sunday Silence (USA)
- Sex: Gelding
- Foaled: 22 May 2014
- Country: United Kingdom
- Colour: Bay
- Breeder: Darley
- Owner: Godolphin
- Trainer: André Fabre (2017); James Cummings (2018–2021)
- Record: 39: 11–3–6
- Earnings: A$ 3,698,985

Major wins
- Premier's Cup (2018); Kingston Town Stakes (2018); The Bart Cummings (2018); Carlyon Cup (2019); Peter Young Stakes (2019); Ranvet Stakes (2019); Tancred Stakes (2019); George Main Stakes (2019)

Avilius (foaled 22 May 2014) is a retired British bred thoroughbred racehorse that won multiple Group 1 races in Australia.

== Background ==
Avilius is a son of Pivotal and was bred at Darley Stud.

== Racing career ==
Originally trained by André Fabre in France, Avilius won a 2400m maiden at Chantilly and the Listed Prix de Suresnes at Maisons-Laffitte. Avilius also had placings in the Prix Eugène Adam and the Prix Guillaume d'Ornano.

Avilius was then transferred to Godolphin's Australian stable of James Cummings where he was gelded. Avilius has won 9 races in Australia, including the Ranvet Stakes, Tancred Stakes and the George Main Stakes which are at Group 1 level.

It was announced in July 2021 that Avilius would be retired from racing and become part of the Godolphin Lifetime Care program, where he would be retrained, most likely as a show horse.

== Pedigree ==
Pedigree of Avilius (GB) 2014
Sire Pivotal (GB) 1993	Polar Falcon (USA); 1987	Nureyev	Northern Dancer
Sire Pivotal (GB) 1993	Polar Falcon (USA); 1987	Nureyev	Special
Sire Pivotal (GB) 1993	Polar Falcon (USA); 1987	Marie D'Argonne	Jefferson
Sire Pivotal (GB) 1993	Polar Falcon (USA); 1987	Marie D'Argonne	Mohair
Sire Pivotal (GB) 1993	Fearless Revival (GB); 1987	Cozzene	Caro
Sire Pivotal (GB) 1993	Fearless Revival (GB); 1987	Cozzene	Ride The Trails
Sire Pivotal (GB) 1993	Fearless Revival (GB); 1987	Stufida	Bustino
Sire Pivotal (GB) 1993	Fearless Revival (GB); 1987	Stufida	Zerbinetta
Dam Alessandria (GB) 2003	Sunday Silence (USA); 1986	Halo	Hail To Reason
Dam Alessandria (GB) 2003	Sunday Silence (USA); 1986	Halo	Cosmah
Dam Alessandria (GB) 2003	Sunday Silence (USA); 1986	Wishing Well	Understanding
Dam Alessandria (GB) 2003	Sunday Silence (USA); 1986	Wishing Well	Mountain Flower
Dam Alessandria (GB) 2003	Tereshkova (USA); 1992	Mr. Prospector	Raise a Native
Dam Alessandria (GB) 2003	Tereshkova (USA); 1992	Mr. Prospector	Gold Digger
Dam Alessandria (GB) 2003	Tereshkova (USA); 1992	Lypatia	Lyphard
Dam Alessandria (GB) 2003	Tereshkova (USA); 1992	Lypatia	Hypatia
