= Premier's Cup (ATC) =

- Hydrogen, 1952 winner
- Class: Group 3
- Location: Randwick Racecourse; Sydney, New South Wales, Australia
- Inaugurated: 1947 (as Rosehill Cup)
- Race type: Thoroughbred – Flat racing
- Sponsor: Gold Coast Turf Club (2026)

Race information
- Distance: 2,000 metres
- Surface: Turf
- Track: Right-handed
- Qualification: Three years old and older
- Weight: Quality handicap
- Purse: $250,000 (2026)

The Premier's Cup is an Australian Turf Club Group 3 Thoroughbred quality handicap horse race, for horses aged three years old and older, over a distance of 2,000 metres, held annually in August.

Since 2022 it has been raced at Randwick Racecourse, Sydney, Australia but previously it was held at Rosehill. The 2021 edition was raced at Kembla Grange due to Covid-19 protocols.

A notable winner was Hydrogen who would go on to win the Cox Plate in 1953 and 1954.

== History ==
=== Name ===
- 1947–1988 - Rosehill Cup
- 1989–1998 - Premier's Cup
- 1999–2004 - Premier's Quality Cup
- 2005 onwards - Premier's Cup

=== Distance ===
- 1947–1951 - 1 1/2 miles (~2400 metres)
- 1952–1955 - 1 1/4 miles (~2000 metres)
- 1956 - 1 1/8 miles (~1800 metres)
- 1957–1971 - 1 1/4 miles (~2000 metres)
- 1972–1986 – 2,000 metres
- 1987 - 1,900 metres
- 1988 - 2,000 metres
- 1989–2002 – 1,900 metres
- 2003–2015 – 1,800 metres
- 2016 - 2021 - 1,900 metres
- 2022 onwards - 2,000 metres

=== Grade ===
- 1947–1978 - Principal Race
- 1979–2017 - Listed Race
- 2018 onwards - Group III

== Winners ==
The following are past winners of the race.

- 2026 - Boniface
- 2025 - Nellie Leylax
- 2024 - Eliyass
- 2023 - Hosier
- 2022 - Arapaho
- 2021 (Kembla Grange) - Harpo Marx
- 2020 - Mugatoo
- 2019 - Wu Gok
- 2018 - Avilius
- 2017 - Dee I Cee
- 2016 - Sense Of Occasion
- 2015 - Magic Hurricane
- 2014 - Greatwood
- 2013 - Less Is More
- 2012 - Glencadam Gold
- 2011 - Break Card
- 2010 - Snow Alert
- 2009 - Emperor Bonaparte
- 2008 - Red Lord
- 2007 - †race not held
- 2006 - Activation
- 2005 - Railings
- 2004 - Bush Honey
- 2003 - Domine
- 2002 - Gamesman
- 2001 - Mulan Princess
- 2000 - Super Revenir
- 1999 - Catapult
- 1998 - Joss Sticks
- 1997 - Ask The Waiter
- 1996 - ‡Meeting abandoned
- 1995 - Ardeed
- 1994 - Century Reign
- 1993 - O'Hara
- 1992 - Donegal Mist
- 1991 - Hammond
- 1990 - Kessem
- 1989 - Port Kingdom
- 1988 - Natural Habit
- 1987 - Northern Plain
- 1986 - Fix The Date
- 1985 - Colour Page
- 1984 - Just For Tristram
- 1983 - Tulsa Knight
- 1982 - Bourbon Boy
- 1981 - Coe
- 1980 - Diamond Park
- 1979 - In Luck
- 1978 - Leonotis
- 1977 - Such Fun
- 1976 - Northbridge Lad
- 1975 - Americano
- 1974 - Broadway Hit
- 1973 - Drum Roll
- 1972 - Red God
- 1971 - Oncidon
- 1970 - Tails
- 1969 - Tails
- 1968 - By Gee
- 1967 - Tupaki
- 1966 - Victory Roll
- 1965 - Duo
- 1964 - Striking Force
- 1963 - Alpensea
- 1962 - Tamure
- 1961 - Gemstone
- 1960 - Boorala
- 1959 - Bardshah
- 1958 - Caranna
- 1957 - Turkestan
- 1956 - Regal Forest
- 1955 - Talisman
- 1954 - El Ziet
- 1953 - Maynard
- 1952 - Hydrogen
- 1951 - Amused
- 1950 - Hurry Up
- 1949 - Dark Marne
- 1948 - Paktong
- 1947 - Courier

† The 2007 race was not held because of outbreak of equine influenza
‡ Meeting was abandoned due to weather

== See also ==
- Show County Quality
- Silver Shadow Stakes
- Toy Show Quality
- Winx Stakes
- Premier's Cup (BRC)
- List of Australian Group races
- Group races
