= Shahzada (horse race) =

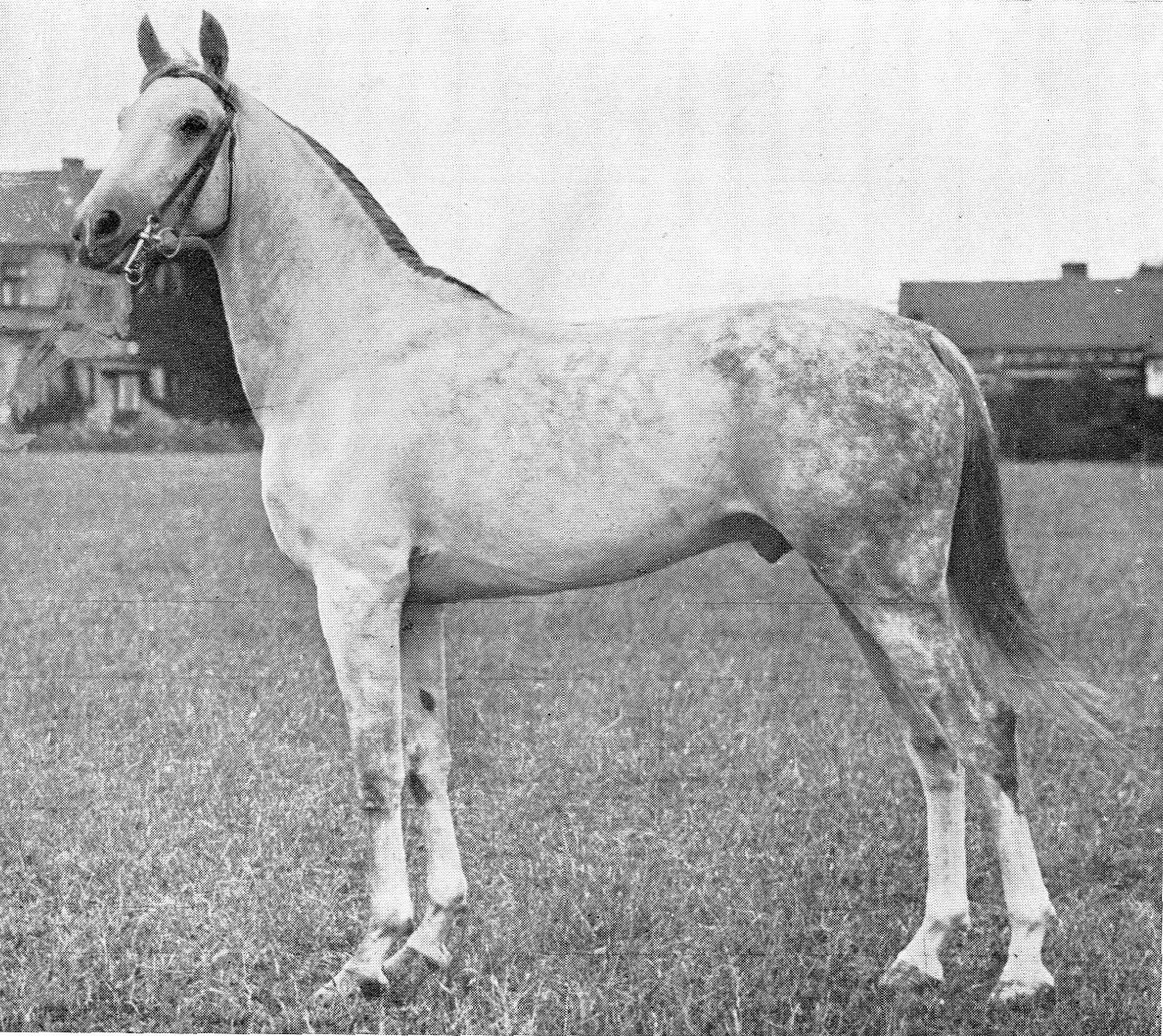
Shahzada the horse that this race is named after.

The Shahzada Memorial Endurance Test is a horse race that has been held annually at St. Albans, New South Wales, Australia since 1981.

It is an endurance race, where competitors must complete a 400-kilometre (250 mi) cross-country route. The race is described as the longest endurance race in the world.

It is named after a purebred Arabian stallion Shahzada (GB) foaled in 1913, winner of two 300 mile endurance races carrying 13½ stone. He was imported to Australia from England in 1925.

== Winners ==
- 1981- Conradclo, Darren Slattery - 29:30
- 1982- Dunwingeri Djharda, Darren Slattery - 30:46
- 1983- Cyclone, Paul Chandler - 26:44
- 1984- Cyclone, Paul Chandler - 28:35
- 1985- =Cyclone, Paul Chandler & Arabian Park Amierr, Alan MacKinder - 26:57
- 1986- Andarra Shareef, Campbell Wood 26:01
- 1987- Cedar Ridge Rob Roy, Mark Freeman 26:42
- 1988- Merridown Tasha, Bill McMillan 29:28
- 1989- Abbeline Lady Rebecca, June Petersen 27:22
- 1990- Kintamani Fosta, Alan Lindsay 31:22
- 1991- Richard, Allan Caslick 26:40
- 1992- Cedar Ridge Rob Roy, Mark Freeman 29:33
- 1993- Kejome Komet, Geoff Hurt 28:53
- 1994- Kintamani Fosta, Helen Lindsay 32:20
- 1995- =Kim Dande Tara, Anne Jones & =Pilgrim Star, Len Law 35:09
- 1996- Hawkesbury Impala, Robert Ward 27:32
- 1997- Hawkesbury Impala, Robert Ward 25:18
- 1998- Hawkesbury Impala, Robert Ward 25:58
- 1999- Ralvon Reflex, Jennifer Gilbertson 28:31
- 2000- Sawaan Rose, Philip (Jock) Haworth 30:01
- 2001- Flash-Lite, Stuart Hitchcock 26:47
- 2002- Jasmine Minstrel, Rex Cox 30:28
- 2003- Flash-Lite, Stuart Hitchcock 31:56
- 2004- Jasmine Minstrel, Melanie Finch 34:27
- 2005- El Jannah Rafiq, Dianne Luker 35:28
- 2006- Evonglen Holmgaard, Brad Dillon 31:44
- 2007- EVENT NOT RUN
- 2008- Phoenix Park Epona, Ken Bradley 35:00
- 2009- Cedar Ridge Magnetic, Courtney Freeman 36:34
- 2010- Sasam, Marion Lengronne 32:19
- 2011- Girilambone Orion, Linda Jonkers 35:06
- 2012- Diamond R Boston, Kim Hagon 34:00
- 2013- =Blake’s Heaven Bombora, Talea hasko-Stewart, =Wantley Kaliph Fia Hasko-Stewart, =Blakes Heaven Summer Reign, Ian Curtis, 34:29
- 2014- Blake's Heaven Summer Wind, Ian Curtis, 35:02
- 2015- =Ra Silver Dancer, Matthew Gadsby, =Kalkadoon Vienna, Marion Lengronne, 34:08
- 2016- Melissa Longhurst Pioneer Park Wings of Sudan, 38: 00
- 2017- Melissa Longhurst Pioneer Park Wings of Sudan, 38: 56
- 2018- Tammy Woodgate Castlebar Galaxy, 41.21
- 2019- Fia Hasko-Stewart Blake's Heaven Adventuress, 35.16
- 2024- Fia Hasko-Stewart Blake's Heaven Adventuress, 37.35
