= 2007 Australian equine influenza outbreak =

Horse disease outbreak in Australia

Location of initial outbreak, 24 August 2007

An outbreak of equine influenza (EI) in Australia was confirmed by the Department of Primary Industries (New South Wales) on 24 August 2007 in Sydney. Also known as "horse flu" and "A1 influenza", the rapid outbreak was of the Influenza A virus strain of subtype H3N8. While the virus is highly contagious, it rarely kills adult horses but the performance of thoroughbred racing horses can be affected for several weeks. It can be fatal to young foals and debilitated horses.

Because of strict quarantine procedures to reduce the risk of exotic pests and diseases entering Australia, this was the first outbreak of equine influenza in Australia. Horses in Australia had not been exposed to the virus and, not being vaccinated, were fully susceptible.

A combination of control measures was successful in combating the outbreak. The last new infected property was identified on 22 December 2007. The zones which had been instituted to permit and restrict movements according to risk were progressively lifted from areas of New South Wales and Queensland. Following the provisional declaration of EI-free status for New South Wales and Queensland, ongoing surveillance and tracking measures are required until the international community recognises that the disease has been eradicated from Australia.

== Outbreak ==
Location of NSW infections by 26 August 2007
Location of Queensland infections by 27 August 2007
Location of NSW infections by 29 August 2007
Location of Queensland infections by 30 August 2007

Four Japanese racing stallions had arrived at Eastern Creek Quarantine Station earlier in August 2007, soon after an outbreak of EI in Japan. By Tuesday 21 August, several horses at Eastern Creek showed symptoms of a viral infection and subsequently tested positive for equine influenza. On the same day, several recreational horses at Centennial Parklands Equestrian Centre also displayed symptoms of infection. There was no direct contact between horses at Eastern Creek and horses at Centennial Park and investigations are underway.

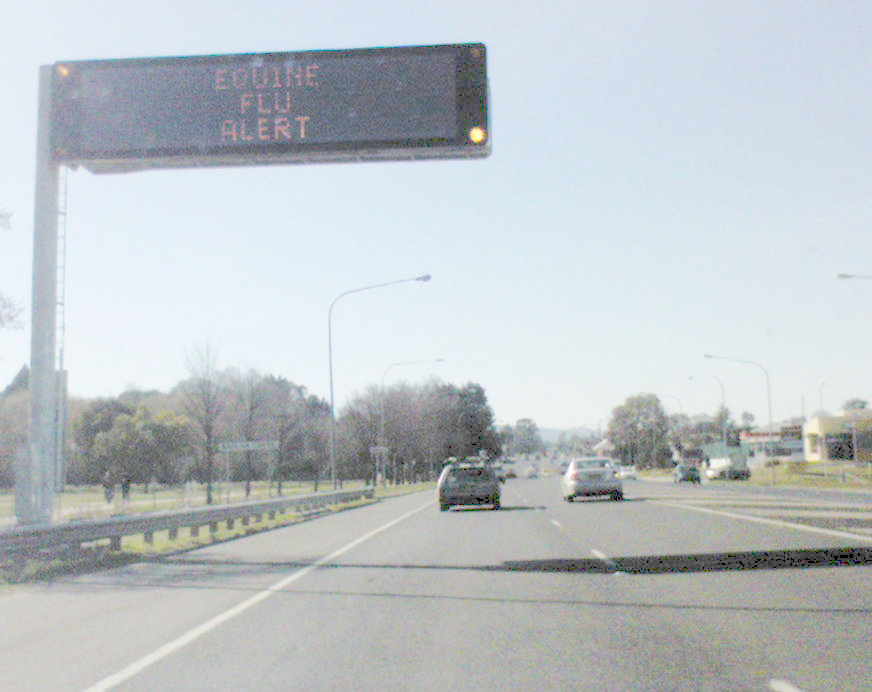
Highway emergency message: EQUINE FLU ALERT

The first case of EI in Australia was confirmed in a stallion at Eastern Creek on 24 August. The positive test resulted in the lockdown of approximately 60 horses at the Eastern Creek and Spotswood quarantine stations (in Sydney and Melbourne respectively). 16 horses at Eastern Creek and at Centennial Parklands tested positive for EI virus while another six exhibited symptoms. By the next day, there were over 80 suspected cases. All horses were isolated and a 72-hour national standstill on the movement of horses was declared.

By 26 August 161 of the 165 horses at Centennial Parklands and other horses at Parkes, Moonbi, Berry, Wilberforce, Cattai and Wyong were confirmed as being infected. Most of the infected horses at Centennial Park were found to have been together at a One Day Event at Maitland the previous week.

On 26 August 2007 about 300 horses were released from the Narrabri Showground where campdraft competitions were held.

By 27 August, more than 400 horses on 50 properties in New South Wales had been quarantined after showing symptoms. A horse trials event at the Morgan Park Equestrian Centre near Warwick in Queensland was locked down after 20 infections were confirmed. Horses at Gatton tested positive on 27 August. Also on 27 August, New South Wales police confirmed that six police horses had tested positive and the police stables were placed under quarantine for two months. Police horses were suspected of being infected after some police riders attended the Maitland gymkhana. Infections were confirmed and quarantine zones established at Mount Hunter, Moree, Aberdeen and Anambah.

On 29 August, a racecourse at Hamilton in Victoria went into lockdown when a horse began to exhibit signs of influenza however, the flu tests were negative.

Additional quarantine zones were declared at Lake Macquarie, Terry Hie Hie, East Maitland, Warwick, Timbumburi, Eagleton (near Raymond Terrace) and some areas of Kenthurst following further positive flu tests. In Queensland, numerous detections of EI were found at an equestrian event at Morgan Park in Warwick in the Southern Downs area.The airborne nature of the virus saw multiple local properties confirmed as infected in proceeding weeks.

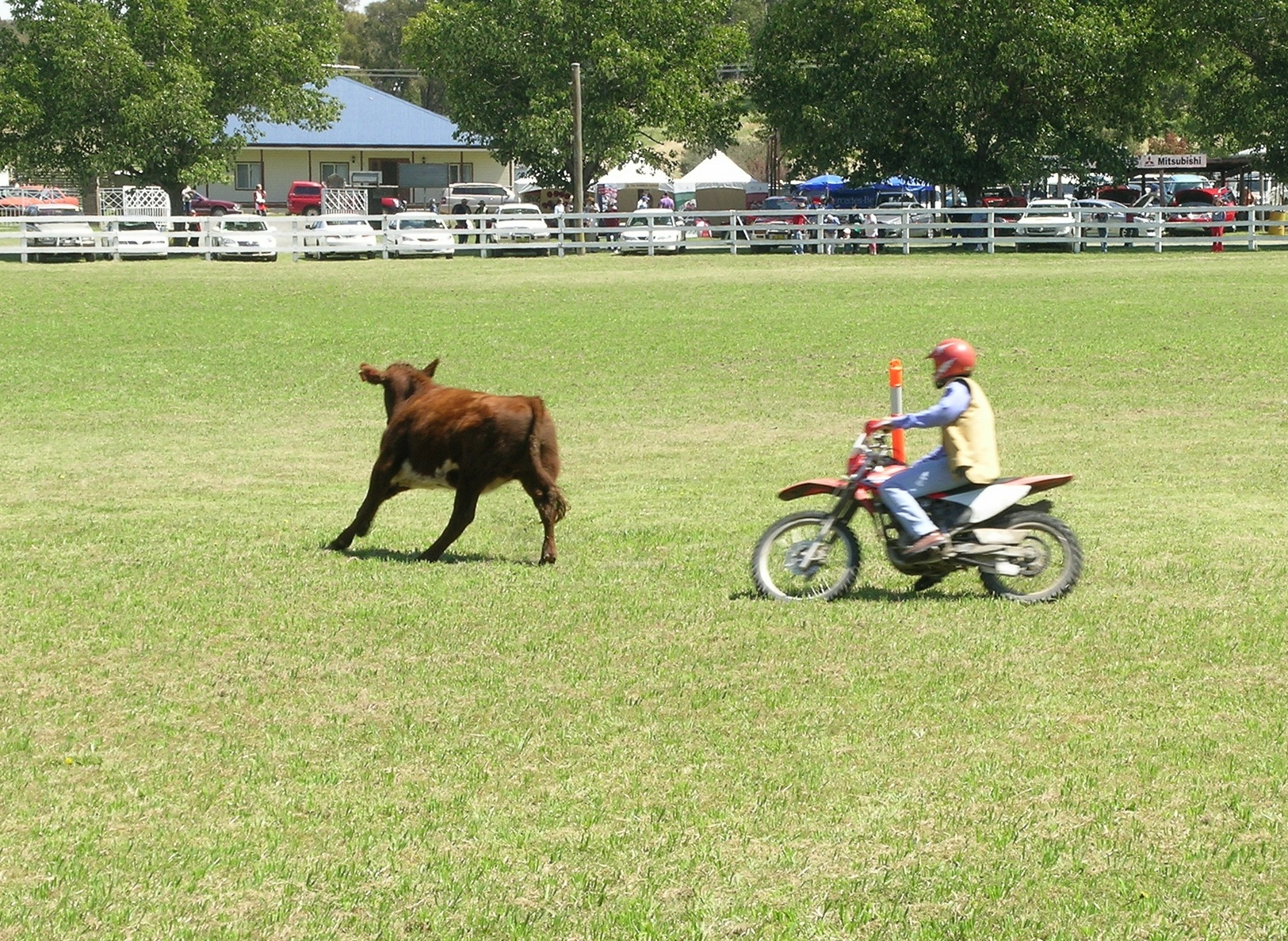
Campdrafting on motorcycle instead of horse, per restrictions

On 30 August, a thoroughbred racehorse at Randwick Racecourse returned a preliminary positive test for EI, although did not have any symptoms of infection. Track work was cancelled and the stables were locked down. Tests confirmed that eight race horses in the stable had EI and the racecourse was quarantined for two months. This brought the number of confirmed infections to 488 on 41 properties, plus another 1,646 suspected infections on 100 properties. The first infection in Brisbane was confirmed, increasing the number of quarantine zones in Queensland to five, with direct linkages to the Morgan Park event.

In early November, it was announced that a new outbreak of EI occurred about 4 kilometres (2.5 mi) south of Walcha.

By early December, the number of new cases had declined and it appeared that the outbreak had been effectively contained. On 22 December a substantial part of the New South Control one was promoted to a provisionally free status.

By mid February 2008 it was increasingly clear that the outbreak had been successfully controlled and, on 28 February, the NSW Government declared victory against EI, lifting most of the remaining movement restrictions on horses.

== Cause ==
There had been no direct contact between the horses at Eastern Creek and Centennial Parklands. Veterinary surgeons suggested the virus must have been transmitted between the two locations by human error. The NSW Government blamed the Eastern Creek quarantine station and demanded the Federal Government hold an inquiry into the "biosecurity breach".

Federal Agriculture Minister Peter McGauran denied any quarantine breach and said the Maitland event "seems to be where the spread of the infection occurred".

A subsequent independent inquiry found that,

In August 2007 there was an intake of 52 horses into the Eastern Creek Quarantine Station in New South Wales and 27 horses into the Spotswood Quarantine Station in Victoria. Thirteen of the horses were from Japan. They arrived at Tullamarine Airport in Melbourne on 8 August. Nine of them were received into Spotswood; the remaining four were taken to Sydney (Kingsford Smith) Airport and from there were transported to Eastern Creek.

Subsequent analyses of blood samples taken from the horses at Eastern Creek and Spotswood established that one of the four Japanese horses at Eastern Creek and seven of the Japanese horses at Spotswood had become infected with equine influenza at some stage before 13 August, when blood samples were first taken while they were in post-arrival quarantine.

...

There are four 'most likely' scenarios that might explain where and how the virus escaped into the general horse population— by airborne spread from Sydney (Kingsford Smith) Airport; by contaminated people, equipment or vehicles associated with the arrival of the horses at that airport and their transport to Eastern Creek Quarantine Station; by airborne spread from Eastern Creek; or by contaminated people or equipment or by some other means from that Quarantine Station. Two other means suggested in evidence were cross-infection by dogs or birds or by some vector such as straw carried by a bird.

The Inquiry concluded that the most likely cause was the arrival of an infected horse or horses from Japan and then that the virus escaped from Eastern Creek on the person, clothing or equipment of a groom, veterinarian, farrier or other person who had contact with an infected horse and who then left the Eastern Creek Quarantine Station without cleaning or disinfecting adequately or at all.

== Response and precautions ==
A 10 km (6 mi) quarantine zone was declared around Eastern Creek Quarantine Station and the Centennial Parklands Equestrian Centre, where the first infections were identified, on 24 August. Quarantine zones were then placed around each new infection site.

A national standstill was decided by the National Committee for Exotic Animal Disease to begin at 1pm on Saturday 25 August. Each state and territory was responsible for enacting the legal instrument within their borders. All horse movements were halted within New South Wales on 25 August, initially for 72 hours. The Control Order was made under the Exotic Diseases of Animals Act 1991 making it illegal to move horses. The Australian Capital Territory, contained wholly within New South Wales, was also declared a quarantine zone with no horse movements permitted across the border. The whole of Victoria was declared a Control Area on 25 August; shortly after, movement bans within Victoria were lifted, but bans on the import of horses and equine gear into Victoria remained until 15 January 2008. Western Australia imposed a 72-hour standstill. Biosecurity Queensland declared the entire state an Equine Standstill Zone from 25 August. with confirmed detections soon after this date from horses that moved from NSW to an equestrian event in Warwick. The Northern Territory government placed a 72-hour ban on horse movements from 27 August.

Sydney's Randwick Racecourse was locked down on 27 August after two horses presented with flu symptoms. Federal Primary Industries Minister Senator Ian Macdonald extended the 72-hour ban on horse movement by 7 days. The New South Wales government subsequently made the ban on horse movements and race meetings indefinite.

Federal Opposition Leader Kevin Rudd called for an independent inquiry into the Australian quarantine system.

The NSW Department of Primary Industries warned horse owners against buying EI vaccine online as the importation of vaccines is illegal.

The Agricultural Societies Council banned horses from agricultural shows at Grenfell, Narromine, Barmedman, Lake Cargelligo, Finley, Manildra, Minto and Woodstock.

The Werribee Open Range Zoo cancelled its rhinoceros tour as a precaution, banned human contact with its zebras and took its horses and donkeys off public display.

On 2 September, the Australian Prime Minister at the time, John Howard, ordered a public inquiry into the outbreak of EI in Australia. He appointed retired former High Court judge Ian Callinan to conduct the inquiry. The Prime Minister stated that Justice Callinan would have sweeping powers to investigate "every aspect" of the crisis. 250 people were questioned in the inquiry, which centred on the Eastern Creek quarantine station in Sydney's western suburbs.

== International reaction ==
New Zealand biosecurity authorities announced that all imports of horses from Australia would be halted indefinitely, and all horses that had arrived since 1 August are being identified. The New Zealand TAB altered meeting times on Sunday 26 August to provide some racing for the Australian betting market and have temporarily suspended early betting on the Australian Spring racing carnival.

Japanese horses were reported as being unlikely to travel to Australia for the Melbourne Spring Racing Carnival. The trainer of defending Melbourne Cup winner Delta Blues and second placegetter Pop Rock confirmed that both horses would not be returning to Australia in 2007.

The Philippines banned imports of Australian racehorses as a precautionary measure, but praised Australia for "acting responsibly and banning the movement of horses".

== Effect ==
James Gilkerson, President of the Australian Equine Veterinarians Association, said the horse racing and breeding industries could come to a standstill if horse flu took hold. John Messara, President of Australian Thoroughbred Breeders, said the industry would lose hundreds of millions of dollars in lost gambling revenue and stallion servicing fees. Federal Treasurer Peter Costello said "when you take into account breeders, trainers, jockeys and race meetings the outbreak will affect the economy."

Peter McGauran called for the Melbourne Cup to be postponed. Racing Victoria Limited admitted the outbreak would affect the Melbourne Spring Racing Carnival but vowed to defy the call to postpone the Melbourne Cup. Several betting agencies temporarily suspended betting on the Melbourne Cup.

New South Wales police said the ban on horse movements could affect crowd control at the APEC Australia 2007 summit where mounted police were planned to be used. Mounted police patrols for APEC were cancelled on 28 August after all NSW police horses were quarantined.

By noon on 27 August, police had stopped over 100 people transporting horses in violation of the ban, and plans to bring police horses from Victoria for APEC had been scrapped.

The Parkes Show was cancelled after several horses in the area were diagnosed with EI and the showground was quarantined. For the second time in its 125-year history, the Birdsville Races were called off as Queensland Racing Minister Andrew Fraser cancelled all horse racing in the state.

The Australian Racing Board agreed to move the breeding season forward by six days to ease anticipated congestion of servicing bookings once the movement ban was lifted.

The Randwick Trainers' Association ceased negotiations with the Catholic Church and the NSW Government over plans to hold a World Youth Day Papal mass at Randwick Racecourse in July 2008. Trainer John O'Shea said holding the mass at Randwick was now "out of the question" as the disruption and damage to the racecourse would multiply the damage of the EI outbreak. However, the mass went ahead, with all horses being removed from the track starting 13 June 2008 in preparation for construction work needed for the event.

The outbreak forced the cancellation of a 3-day qualifying event for the 2008 Summer Olympics scheduled to be held in Sydney on 13 September.

Cattle mustering in Queensland, which is often carried out on horseback, was halted due to the ban on horse movements.

The Sydney spring racing carnival was cancelled following the outbreak at Randwick racecourse. NSW horses will be prevented from travelling to Melbourne for the Melbourne Cup.

The Equine Influenza has also had an ongoing effect on the Largest National Equine Endurance Event The Shahzada which was to be held at St Albans NSW from 27 to 31 August. All horses at the event were locked down for over a week, with many competitors travelling from interstate. It has been a disaster, with many not being able to bring their highly trained animals home. Many of these horses have had to be left on properties within New South Wales.

On 23 January 2008 The Keeper of the Australian Stud Book, Michael Ford, reported that "To date, 23,305 mares have recorded coverings by 679 stallions, a decrease of 13% on last year’s 26,800 coverings." However, Mr Ford expected the gap to be narrowed to 10% after late lodgements and paddock services were received later in the season. "A depleted foal crop will have an effect on racing in two years, lasting for several years" explained Mr Ford. "It also impacts on future foal crops in six years' time when horses from that crop go to stud."

New South Wales was declared free of equine influenza by the state Primary Industries Minister, Ian Macdonald on 29 February 2008. Queensland, the only other state affected by the outbreak, has no infected properties and is expected to be declared EI free within a few weeks.

== Callinan Report ==
Former judge Ian Callinan was commissioned to undertake an investigation into the EI outbreak. His findings were released on 12 June 2008 in a scathing report, in which Australia's quarantine system was described as "inefficient, underfunded and lacking diligence". The new Agriculture Minister Tony Burke promised that all 38 of the report's recommendations would be implemented, and that a "massive change" in the culture of the quarantine service should occur. The federal government also appointed Professor Peter Shergold to oversee the implementation of the report's recommendations over 2009–2010.
