= Canterbury Park Racecourse =

Horse racing facility in Sydney, Australia

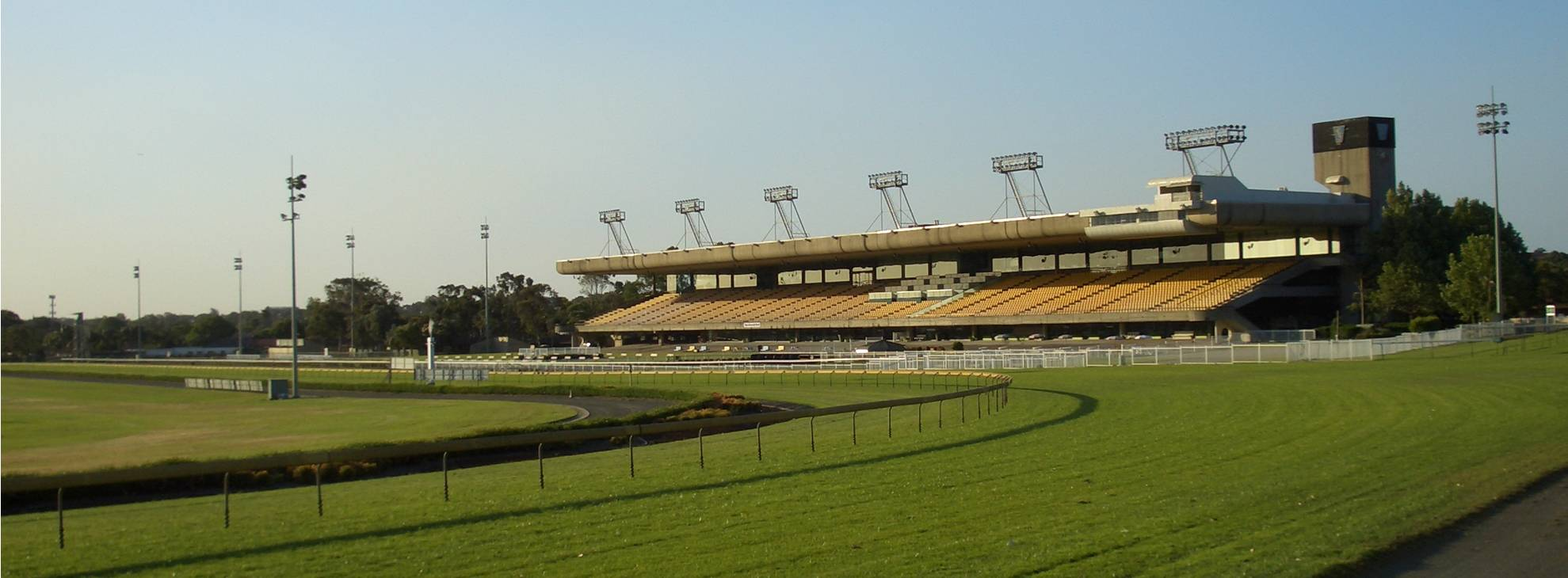
- Canterbury Park Racecourse
- Location: Sydney, New South Wales, Australia
- Coordinates: 33°54′25″S 151°06′55″E
- Owned by: Australian Turf Club
- Date opened: 1871

Canterbury Park Racecourse is a racecourse for horse racing in Sydney, New South Wales, Australia. It is located 11 km (7 mi) from the Sydney Central Business District, in King Street in the suburb of Canterbury, adjacent to Canterbury railway station. The racecourse is operated by the Australian Turf Club.

== History ==
The first horse racing in Canterbury was in 1852 when Cornelius Proud cleared part of his property for use as a racecourse, this was used regularly by locals. In 1871, after a few years with no race meetings being held, Frederick Clissold and Thomas Austen Davis held a race meeting on land that had been leased by Davis close to the existing racecourse. In 1884 the site was leased as the headquarters of Canterbury Park Race Club. A racetrack, 700 person grandstand and recreational park was constructed and held its first meeting on 19 January 1884. In 1886, 53 acres (21 ha) of the leased land was purchased by Davis for use by the club.

Up until World War I there was a zoo located on site that housed animals such as kangaroos, wallabies, emus, brolgas, curlews, pheasants and kookaburras.

The Sydney Turf Club (STC) acquired the racecourse and held its first meeting in January 1945. The STC held the racecourse until 2011 when the Sydney Turf Club and Australian Jockey Club merged to become the Australian Turf Club. The Australian Turf Club are the current owners and operators of Canterbury Park Racecourse.
