= Grand Lodge (horse) =

American-bred Thoroughbred racehorse

- Racing silks of Lord Howard de Walden
- Sire: Chief's Crown
- Grandsire: Danzig
- Dam: La Papagena
- Damsire: Habitat
- Sex: Stallion
- Foaled: 6 March 1991
- Died: 24 December 2003 (aged 12)
- Country: United States
- Colour: Chestnut
- Breeder: Lord Howard de Walden
- Owner: Lord Howard de Walden
- Trainer: William Jarvis
- Record: 13: 4-2-3
- Earnings: £449,174

Major wins
- Somerville Tattersall Stakes (1993); Dewhurst Stakes (1993); St James's Palace Stakes (1994)
- Last updated on June 22, 2007

Grand Lodge (foaled 6 March 1991, died 24 December 2003) was an American-bred, British-trained Thoroughbred racehorse. He was officially rated the best European two-year-old 1993. He won two Group One races; the Dewhurst Stakes in 1993 and the St James's Palace Stakes in 1994. He is best known as a successful sire. At the time of his death he was standing at the Woodlands Stud, Denman, New South Wales.

== Background ==
Grand Lodge was bred by his owner John Scott-Ellis, 9th Baron Howard de Walden, who also owned and bred The Derby winner Slip Anchor and the champion miler Kris

He was sired by Chief's Crown out of Lord Howard de Walden's unraced mare La Papagena. Chief's Crown won the 1984 Breeders' Cup Juvenile and was voted the Eclipse Award for Outstanding Two-Year-Old Male Horse. He sired several other important horses including Chief Bearheart and Erhaab. La Papagena, a daughter of the Cheveley Park Stakes and Coronation Stakes winner Magic Flute, produced several other winners, the best of them probably being the Listed stakes winner La Persiana.

Grand Lodge was trained throughout his career by William "Willie" Jarvis at the Phantom House stables at Newmarket, Suffolk. When Grand Lodge ran, Jarvis often wore an apricot-coloured rose as a button-hole, to match the silks of Lord Howard de Walden.

== Racing career ==
=== 1993: two-year-old season ===
Grand Lodge won three of his four races as a two-year-old. On his debut he won the Granville Maiden Stakes at Ascot by six lengths. A month later at York he was beaten when odds-on favourite for the Listed Acomb Stakes, finishing third to Concordial.

At Newmarket in October he won the Somerville Tattersall Stakes, leading a furlong out and going clear to beat Colonel Collins by three and a half lengths, and was then moved up to Group One class for the Dewhurst Stakes over the same course and distance two weeks later. He was made 9/4 favourite and led inside the final furlong to beat Stonehatch and Nicolotte in a driving finish. Jarvis emphasised the care that he would take with his best horse by saying 'You ought to start buying shares in cotton wool because that's what this horse is going to be wrapped in."

=== 1994: three-year-old season ===
Despite what his trainer had said, Grand Lodge was given a demanding schedule in 1994, running nine times, eight of them in Group One company.

His only win came at Royal Ascot where he ran on under a strong ride from Michael Kinane to beat Distant View by a head in the St James's Palace Stakes. After the race Jarvis called him "a very easy horse to train...Even I can't bugger him up." In other starts he was beaten a short head in both the 2000 Guineas and the Champion Stakes, finished third in the Sussex Stakes and Irish Champion Stakes and was fourth in the Irish 2,000 Guineas and the International Stakes.

On his last start he ran one of his few bad races, finishing unplaced behind Concern in the Breeders' Cup Classic on his only race on dirt.

== Assessment ==
In the International Classification for 1993, he was rated the best two-year-old colt in Europe on a mark of 120. Despite this he was beaten in the voting for the Cartier Racing Award by the Middle Park Stakes winner First Trump.

At three, he was rated on 125, making him the seventh-best three-year-old in Europe, five pounds behind the filly Balanchine and three pounds below the leading colt, Distant View.

== Stud career ==
Grand Lodge was retired to stand as a stallion for the Coolmore Stud, being shuttled between their main base in Ireland, Lord Howard de Walden's Plantation Stud in England and the Woodlands Stud in Australia. Grand Lodge proved to be an extremely popular stallion: between 1998 and 2003 he was covering an average of more than 300 mares a year. He sired the winners of more than six hundred races including Sinndar, Grandera, Queen's Logic, Grand Couturier (Sword Dancer Invitational Handicap), Indian Lodge and Shogun Lodge (Epsom Handicap).

=== Notable progeny ===
Throughout his career Grand Lodge sired 12 individual Group One winners for a total of 25 Group One races:

c = colt, f = filly, g = gelding

Foaled	Name	Sex	Major Wins
1996	Freemason	g	T J Smith Stakes, Queensland Derby, Mercedes Classic
1996	Indian Lodge	c	Prix du Moulin de Longchamp, Prix de la Forêt
1996	Shogun Lodge	g	George Main Stakes, Epsom Handicap, Queen Elizabeth Stakes
1997	Lovelorn	f	VRC Oaks
1997	Sinndar	c	National Stakes, Epsom Derby, Irish Derby, Prix de l'Arc de Triomphe
1998	Grandera	c	Singapore Airlines International Cup, Prince of Wales's Stakes, Irish Champion Stakes
1999	Queen's Logic	f	Cheveley Park Stakes
2000	Grand Zulu	g	The BMW
2000	Ambulance	g	Sires' Produce Stakes
2002	Hotel Grand	c	Spring Champion Stakes, Randwick Guineas
2002	Shamdala	f	Gran Premio di Milano
2003	Grand Couturier	c	Sword Dancer Stakes (twice), Joe Hirsch Turf Classic Stakes

== Death ==
On 4 September 2003, Grand Lodge suffered a knee injury in the paddock of the Woodlands Stud. The injury did not respond to treatment and he was euthanized on 24 December. He was buried at the Woodlands Stud. At the time of his death his stud fee for 2004 had already been set at €50,000.

== Pedigree ==
Pedigree of Grand Lodge (USA), chestnut stallion, 1991
Sire Chief's Crown (USA) 1982	Danzig; 1977	Northern Dancer	Nearctic
Sire Chief's Crown (USA) 1982	Danzig; 1977	Northern Dancer	Natalma
Sire Chief's Crown (USA) 1982	Danzig; 1977	Pas De Nom	Admiral's Voyage
Sire Chief's Crown (USA) 1982	Danzig; 1977	Pas De Nom	Petitioner
Sire Chief's Crown (USA) 1982	Six Crowns; 1976	Secretariat	Bold Ruler
Sire Chief's Crown (USA) 1982	Six Crowns; 1976	Secretariat	Somethingroyal
Sire Chief's Crown (USA) 1982	Six Crowns; 1976	Chris Evert	Swoon's Son
Sire Chief's Crown (USA) 1982	Six Crowns; 1976	Chris Evert	Miss Carmie
Dam La Papagena (GB) 1983	Habitat; 1966	Sir Gaylord	Turn-To
Dam La Papagena (GB) 1983	Habitat; 1966	Sir Gaylord	Somethingroyal
Dam La Papagena (GB) 1983	Habitat; 1966	Little Hut	Occupy
Dam La Papagena (GB) 1983	Habitat; 1966	Little Hut	Savage Beauty
Dam La Papagena (GB) 1983	Magic Flute; 1968	Tudor Melody	Tudor Minstrel
Dam La Papagena (GB) 1983	Magic Flute; 1968	Tudor Melody	Matelda
Dam La Papagena (GB) 1983	Magic Flute; 1968	Filigrana	Niccolo dell'Arca
Dam La Papagena (GB) 1983	Magic Flute; 1968	Filigrana	Gamble in Gold (family 14-b)
