= Freemason (horse) =

Australian-bred Thoroughbred racehorse

- Sire: Grand Lodge
- Grandsire: Chief's Crown
- Dam: Sashed
- Damsire: Sir Tristram
- Sex: Gelding
- Foaled: 1996
- Country: Australia
- Colour: Bay
- Owner: Woodlands Stud
- Trainer: John Hawkes
- Record: 62:7-7-7
- Earnings: $3,492,540

Major wins
- T.J. Smith Stakes (1999); Frank Packer Plate (2000); Queensland Derby (2000); Winning Edge Presentations Stakes (2001); Labour Day Cup (2002); The BMW (2003)
- Last updated on 12 November 2017

Freemason was an Australian racehorse from the early 2000s. He was owned by the Inghams and trained by John Hawkes. His most famous win was the 2003 BMW Stakes where he raced neck and neck down the straight with Northerly and just prevailed. He won A$3,482,440.
