= Indian Lodge =

Irish-bred Thoroughbred racehorse

- Sire: Grand Lodge
- Grandsire: Chief's Crown
- Dam: Repetitious
- Damsire: Northfields
- Sex: Stallion
- Foaled: 20 April 1996
- Country: Ireland
- Colour: Bay
- Breeder: Roy Strudwick
- Owner: Seymour Cohn & Eric Parker
- Trainer: Amanda Perrett
- Record: 19: 8-1-3
- Earnings: £257,214

Major wins
- Joel Stakes (1999); Darley Stakes (1999); Earl of Sefton Stakes (2000); Sandown Mile (2000); Prix du Moulin (2000); Prix de la Forêt (2000)

Indian Lodge (20 April 1996 – ca. 2006) was an Irish-bred, British-trained Thoroughbred racehorse and sire. He failed to win as a two-year-old in 1998 but made steady progress in the following year, taking two minor races in spring and ending the season with victories in the Joel Stakes and Darley Stakes. He reached his peak as a four-year-old in 2000 when he won the Earl of Sefton Stakes, Sandown Mile, Prix du Moulin and Prix de la Forêt. He had little success as a breeding stallion.

== Background ==
Indian Lodge was a bay or brown horse bred in County Kilkenny, Ireland by Roy and Belinda Strudwick. He was bought as a foal by Eric Parker. As a yearling in 1997 he was consigned by Parker's Crimbourne Stud to the Tattersalls Houghton sale and was bought back for 40,000 guineas by the bloodstock agency BBA (England), which was acting on Parker's behalf. The colt entered the ownership of Seymour Cohn although Parker retained a substantial interest. He was sent into training with Amanda Perrett at Pulborough, West Sussex.

He was sired from the first crop of foals sired by Grand Lodge the winner of the Dewhurst Stakes and the St. James's Palace Stakes. His other foals included Sinndar, Grandera, Shogun Lodge and Queen's Logic. Indian Lodge's dam Repetitious was a high-class sprinter who recorded her biggest win in the Stewards' Cup. She was a great-granddaughter of the British broodmare Nearly, whose other descendants have included Derring-Do, Doyoun, Alexandrova and Rekindling.

Indian Lodge was at his best on soft or heavy ground and was described as a "mud lover".

== Racing career ==
=== 1998: two-year-old season ===
Indian Lodge was ridden in all three of his races a juvenile by Seb Sanders. On his racecourse debut he started at odds of 14/1 for a maiden race over seven furlongs at Leicester Racecourse on 8 September and finished third behind Culzean and Lover's Leap, beaten six lengths by the winner. Three weeks later he came home eighth of the twenty-six runners in a sales race over the same distance at Newmarket Racecourse. On his final run of the year he finished sixth behind Dubai Millennium in an eighteen-runner maiden race at Yarmouth Racecourse.

=== 1999: three-year-old season ===
On his three-year-old debut the Indian Lodge was partnered by Michael Roberts in a maiden, over a mile at Newbury Racecourse on 14 May and recorded his first success as he won by six lengths from the Queen's colt Daytime. With Roberts in the saddle he followed up at Yarmouth twelve days later, starting the 9/4 second favourite and winning "comfortably" by a neck from Zarfoot. In the summer of 1999 Indian Lodge was campaigned in handicap races. He finished sixth in the Britannia Stakes at Royal Ascot in June and third in a more valuable event when matched against older horses at Goodwood Racecourse in July. He was dropped back to seven furlongs at Ascot on 7 August but ran moderately and came home fourteenth of the twenty-seven runners.

On 11 September Indian Lodge ran second to the Barry Hills-trained Calcutta in a handicap at Doncaster Racecourse. At the end of the month the colt was stepped up in class for the Listed Joel Stakes at Newmarket and started at odds of 7/1 in a thirteen-runner field. Ridden by Roberts he took the lead approaching the final furlong and kept on well to win by half a length. Kieren Fallon took the ride when Indian Lodge started at 9/2 for the Darley Stakes over eight and a half furlongs at the same track on 15 October. After looking outpaced in the last quarter mile he rallied strongly, caught the leader Maidaan on the line, and won by a head.

=== 2000: four-year-old season ===
Indian Lodge began his third campaign in the Group 3 Earl of Sefton Stakes over nine furlongs at Newmarket on 19 April with the ride going to Mick Kinane. Shiva started favourite ahead of Bomb Alaska (Ben Marshall Stakes) and Mujahid with Indian Lodge the 10/1 fourth choice in the betting. He raced close to the leaders from the start, gained the advantage is the last quarter mile, went clear of his opponent, and won by two and a half lengths. Nine days later the colt was dropped in distance but moved up in class for the Group 2 Sandown Mile and started the 9/4 favourite in a six-runner field which also included Handsome Ridge (the winner of the race in 1998), Almushtarak (winner in 1999), Trans Island (Prix du Rond Point), Mujahid and Warningford (Leicestershire Stakes). Ridden by Kinane he raced in second place before taking the lead a quarter mile from the finish and won "readily" by two lengths and a neck from Trans Island and Almushtarak. In May he stepped up to Group 1 class for the Lockinge Stakes at Newbury and finished third of the seven runners behind Aljabr and Trans Island. In the Queen Anne Stakes at Royal Ascot in June he finished seventh of the eleven runners behind Kalanisi, fading badly in the closing stages after being in contention until the last quarter mile.

After a two and a half month break, Indian Lodge returned to the track in France and started at odds of 11.3/1 for the Prix du Moulin over 1600 metres at Longchamp Racecourse on 3 September in which seven opponents included Dansili, Diktat and Fly to the Stars. Ridden by Cash Asmussen he raced in second place behind Fly to the Stars before taking the lead 200 metres from the finish and keeping on strongly to win by two lengths from Kingsalsa. At Ascot three weeks later the colt started second favourite for the Queen Elizabeth II Stakes but never looked likely to win and came home seventh of the twelve runner behind Observatory.

On 15 October Indian Lodge returned to Longchamp on 15 October for the Prix de la Forêt over 1400 metres in which he was partnered by the veteran Pat Eddery. He started the 3.6/1 second choice in the betting behind Dansili in an eleven-runner field which also included Zarkiya (Prix de Sandringham), Touch of the Blues (Critérium de Maisons-Laffitte), Tran Island, Danzigaway (Prix Perth) and Sugarfoot (Park Stakes). Indian Lodge exited the final turn in third place, took the lead 200 metres from the finish and accelerated away from the field to win by two and a half lengths from Dansili. Amanda Perrett commented "Seven furlongs is probably short of his best. However, with conditions right for him today everything has gone perfectly". For his final race, Indian Lodge was sent to the United States to contest the Breeders' Cup Mile at Churchill Downs on 4 November in which he finished unplaced behind War Chant.

In the 2000 International Classification (the forerunner of the World Thoroughbred Racehorse Rankings) Indian Lodge was given a rating of 123, making him the 21st best racehorse in the world.

== Stud record ==
After his retirement from racing Indian Lodge became a breeding stallion at the Rathbarry Stud in Ireland. He later stood in Sweden and Chile before moving to the Hedgeholme Stud in England. He sired many minor winners but top-class performers. His last foals were born in 2007.

== Pedigree ==
Pedigree of Indian Lodge (IRE), bay or brown stallion, 1996
| Sire Grand Lodge (USA) 1991 | Chief's Crown; 1982 | Danzig | Northern Dancer (CAN) |
| Sire Grand Lodge (USA) 1991 | Chief's Crown; 1982 | Danzig | Pas de Nom |
| Sire Grand Lodge (USA) 1991 | Chief's Crown; 1982 | Six Crowns | Secretariat |
| Sire Grand Lodge (USA) 1991 | Chief's Crown; 1982 | Six Crowns | Chris Evert |
| Sire Grand Lodge (USA) 1991 | La Papagena (GB); 1983 | Habitat (USA) | Sir Gaylord |
| Sire Grand Lodge (USA) 1991 | La Papagena (GB); 1983 | Habitat (USA) | Little Hut |
| Sire Grand Lodge (USA) 1991 | La Papagena (GB); 1983 | Magic Flute | Tudor Melody |
| Sire Grand Lodge (USA) 1991 | La Papagena (GB); 1983 | Magic Flute | Filigrana |
| Dam Repetitious (IRE) 1977 | Northfields (USA); 1968 | Northern Dancer (CAN) | Nearctic |
| Dam Repetitious (IRE) 1977 | Northfields (USA); 1968 | Northern Dancer (CAN) | Natalma (USA) |
| Dam Repetitious (IRE) 1977 | Northfields (USA); 1968 | Little Hut | Occupy |
| Dam Repetitious (IRE) 1977 | Northfields (USA); 1968 | Little Hut | Savage Beauty |
| Dam Repetitious (IRE) 1977 | Nanette (GB); 1961 | Worden (FR) | Wild Risk |
| Dam Repetitious (IRE) 1977 | Nanette (GB); 1961 | Worden (FR) | Sans Tares (GB) |
| Dam Repetitious (IRE) 1977 | Nanette (GB); 1961 | Claudette | Chanteur (FR) |
| Dam Repetitious (IRE) 1977 | Nanette (GB); 1961 | Claudette | Nearly (Family: 21-a) |

- Indian Lodge was inbred 3 × 4 to both Northern Dancer and Little Hut, meaning that these horses appear in both the third and fourth generations of his pedigree.
