= John Hawkes (horseman) =

Australian racehorse trainer

Personal information
- Born: 1949 (age 76–77) Australia
- Occupation: Racehorse trainer

Horse racing career
- Sport: Horse racing

Racing awards
- Australian Racing Hall of Fame

John Hawkes is an Australian Thoroughbred racehorse trainer who is notable for heading:

- the national trainers' premiership ten times
- the Sydney premiership nine times (1993/94, 94/95, 95/96, 97/98, 98/99, 99/2000, 2003/04, 05/06, 06/07)
- leading Group One trainer six times
- leading stakes-winning trainer nine times.

Hawkes started in the racing industry in Adelaide as an apprentice jockey.

From 1989 to the mid-2000s, John Hawkes managed stables in Adelaide, Brisbane, Sydney and Melbourne for Bob and Jack Ingham.

In 2004 Hawkes was inducted into the Australian Racing Hall of Fame. He is also inducted into the South Australian Racing Hall of Fame.

In 2007 Hawkes left the Ingham operation and has subsequently trained in partnership with his sons Michael and Wayne.

== Notable horses and victories ==
Hawkes has trained, or co-trained, a large number of high-class horses, including:

- Accomplice, winner of the 1997 Doomben 10,000
- All Too Hard, winner of the 2012 Caulfield Guineas and 2013 All Aged Stakes
- Arena, winner of the 1998 Victoria Derby
- Cameronic, winner of the 1988 Goodwood Handicap
- Chautauqua
- Cross Swords, winner of the 1994 Sydney Cup
- Divine Profit, winner of the 2016 Caulfield Guineas
- Fiumicino, winner of the 2009 The BMW
- Freemason, winner of the 2000 Queensland Derby and 2003 The BMW
- Galena Boy, winner of the 1975 Victoria Derby
- Inference, winner of the 2017 Randwick Guineas
- Leebaz, winner of the 2015 and 2016 A D Hollindale Stakes and 2016 Easter Cup
- Little Papoose, winner of the 1972 South Australian Oaks
- Lonhro, Australian Horse of the Year in 2003/04 and winner of 11 Group One races including the 2001 Caulfield Guineas, 2002 Yalumba Stakes, the 2003 and 2004 George Ryder Stakes and the 2004 Australian Cup
- Lord Galaxy, winner of the 1986 Goodwood Handicap
- Love Conquers All, winner of the 2010 Missile Stakes, 2011 Betfair Stakes and 2011 The Shorts (ATC)
- Maluckyday, winner of the 2010 Lexus Stakes and runner up in the 2010 Melbourne Cup
- Mentality
- Messene
- Mighty Manitou, winner of the 1982 AJC Sires Produce Stakes
- Mossfun, winner of the 2014 Golden Slipper Stakes
- New Logic
- Niello
- Niwot, winner of the 2012 Sydney Cup
- Octagonal, Australian Horse of the Year in 1995/96 and winner of 10 Group One races including the 1995 Cox Plate, 1996 Australian Derby, Tancred Stakes
- Over
- Paratroopers
- Pride Of Ingenue
- Railings, winner of the 2005 Caulfield Cup
- Real Saga
- Runyon, winner of the 1975 Perth Cup
- Star Turn
- Toltrice, winner of the 1972 The Thousand Guineas, Wakeful Stakes and VRC Oaks
- Toulouse Lautrec, winenr of the 2004 Queensland Derby
- Viscount

== See also ==
- Thoroughbred racing in Australia
