= Kingsford-Smith Cup =

Kingsford-Smith Cup registered as BTC Cup
- Class: Group 1
- Location: Eagle Farm Racecourse; Brisbane, Australia
- Inaugurated: 1964 (as J.T. Delaney Quality Handicap)
- Race type: Thoroughbred - Flat racing
- Sponsor: Ladbrokes (2026)

Race information
- Distance: 1,300 metres
- Surface: Turf
- Track: Right-handed
- Qualification: Three year old and older
- Weight: Weight for Age
- Purse: A$1,000,000 (2026)

The Kingsford-Smith Cup, registered as the BTC Cup is a Brisbane Racing Club Group 1 Thoroughbred Weight for Age horse race, run over a distance of 1,300 metres (4,300 ft) at Eagle Farm Racecourse, Brisbane, Australia during the Queensland Winter Racing Carnival.

== History ==
The race has been growing in status and was elevated to Group 1 in 2006 and has been won by some notable sprinters such as Apache Cat and Black Caviar.

The original race name was named in honour of former long time committeeman of the Brisbane Amateur Turf Club, J.T. Delaney.

In 2017 the Brisbane Racing Club moved the race from Doomben Racecourse to Eagle Farm Racecourse and renamed the race after Australian aviator Charles Kingsford Smith.

=== Name ===
- 1964–1982 - J.T. Delaney Quality Handicap
- 1983 - Power Hotels Quality
- 1984 - Stefan Sprint
- 1985–1990 - Tourist Minister's Cup
- 1991–1994 - Robin's Kitchen Cup
- 1995–1997 - Foster's Cup
- 1998–2000 - Carlton Cup
- 2001 - Carlton Draught Cup
- 2002–2003 - Wyndham Estate Cup
- 2004–2016 - BTC Cup
- 2017 - Kingsford-Smith Cup

=== Grade ===
- 1964–1979 - Principal Race
- 1980–1982 - Listed Race
- 1983–1986 - Group 3
- 1987–2005 - Group 2
- 2006 onwards - Group 1 race

=== Distance ===
- 1964–1972 - 7 furlongs (~1400 metres)
- 1973–1979 – 1200 metres
- 1980–1990 – 1350 metres
- 1991–2016 – 1200 metres
- 2017 – 1300 metres
- 2018 – 1350 metres
- 2019 – 1300 metres

=== Venue ===
- Prior to 2013 - Doomben Racecourse
- 2013 - Eagle Farm Racecourse
- 2014–2016 - Doomben Racecourse
- 2017 - Eagle Farm Racecourse
- 2018 - Doomben Racecourse
- 2019 - Eagle Farm Racecourse

== Winners ==
The following are past winners of the race.

- 2026 - Headley Grange
- 2025 - Joliestar
- 2024 - I Wish I Win
- 2023 - Think About It
- 2022 - Apache Chase
- 2021 - Vega One
- 2020 - ‡race not held
- 2019 - The Bostonian
- 2018 - Impending
- 2017 - Clearly Innocent
- 2016 - Malaguerra
- 2015 - Hot Snitzel
- 2014 - Famous Seamus
- 2013 - Your Song
- 2012 - Sea Siren
- 2011 - Black Caviar
- 2010 - Albert The Fat
- 2009 - Duporth
- 2008 - Apache Cat
- 2007 - Bentley Biscuit
- 2006 - Gee I Jane
- 2005 - Spark Of Life
- 2004 - Thorn Park
- 2003 - Falvelon
- 2002 - Lord Essex
- 2001 - Fritz
- 2000 - Falvelon
- 1999 - Staging
- 1998 - General Nediym
- 1997 - Accomplice
- 1996 - Chief De Beers
- 1995 - Seawinne
- 1994 - Buck's Pride
- 1993 - Buck's Pride
- 1992 - Barrosa Boy
- 1991 - St. Jude
- 1990 - Gypsy Rogue
- 1989 - High Regard
- 1988 - Cool Report
- 1987 - Broad Reach
- 1986 - Goldorme
- 1985 - Sports Ruler
- 1984 - Mr. Illusion
- 1983 - Strawberry Road
- 1982 - Todonic
- 1981 - Grand Rocky
- 1980 - Vinegar Joe
- 1979 - Stylee
- 1978 - March Legend
- 1977 - Innisfree
- 1976 - Ima Shadow
- 1975 - Martindale
- 1974 - Tontonan
- 1973 - Triton
- 1972 - Charlton Boy
- 1971 - Ricochet
- 1970 - Cabochon
- 1969 - Dual Control
- 1968 - Prince Gauntlet
- 1967 - Eye Liner
- 1966 - Flying Fancy
- 1965 - Todwana
- 1964 - Rashlore

‡ Not held because of the COVID-19 pandemic

== See also ==
- Fred Best Classic
- Lord Mayor's Cup (BRC)
- Moreton Cup
- Premier's Cup (BRC)
- Queensland Derby
- Queensland Oaks
- Sires' Produce Stakes (BRC)
- List of Australian Group races
- Group races
