= Tramway Stakes =

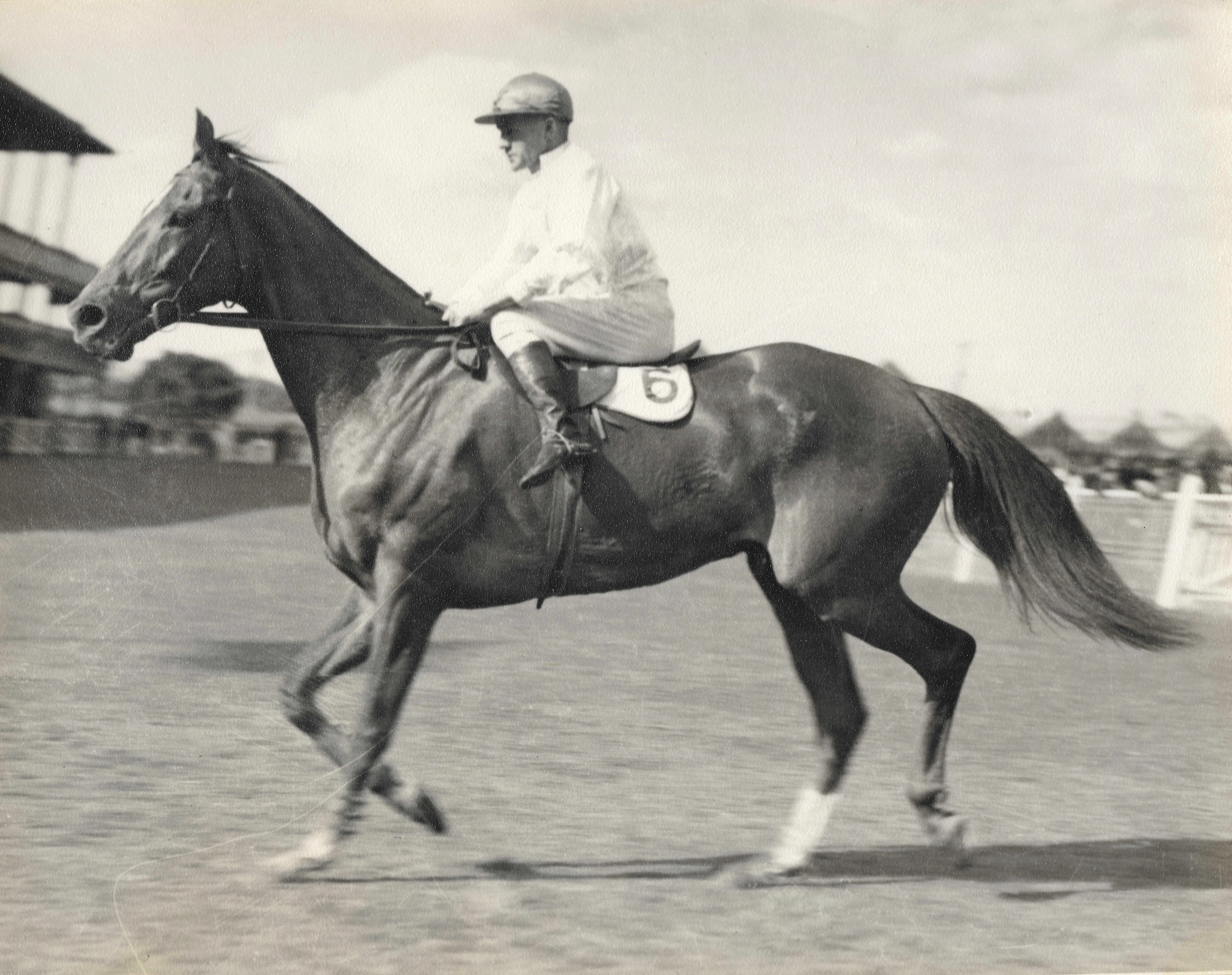
- Lough Neagh, & Fred Shean 1935 & 1937
- Class: Group 2
- Location: Randwick Racecourse, Sydney, Australia
- Inaugurated: 1886
- Race type: Thoroughbred - flat
- Sponsor: Myplates (2026)

Race information
- Distance: 1,400 metres
- Surface: Turf
- Track: Right-handed
- Qualification: Horses three years old and older
- Weight: Set weights with penalties
- Purse: A$300,000 (2026)

The Tramway Stakes, registered as the Tramway Handicap, is a City Tattersalls Club Group 2 Thoroughbred horse race for horses three years old and older run with set weights and penalties, over a distance of 1400 metres at Randwick Racecourse, Sydney, Australia in September.

== History ==
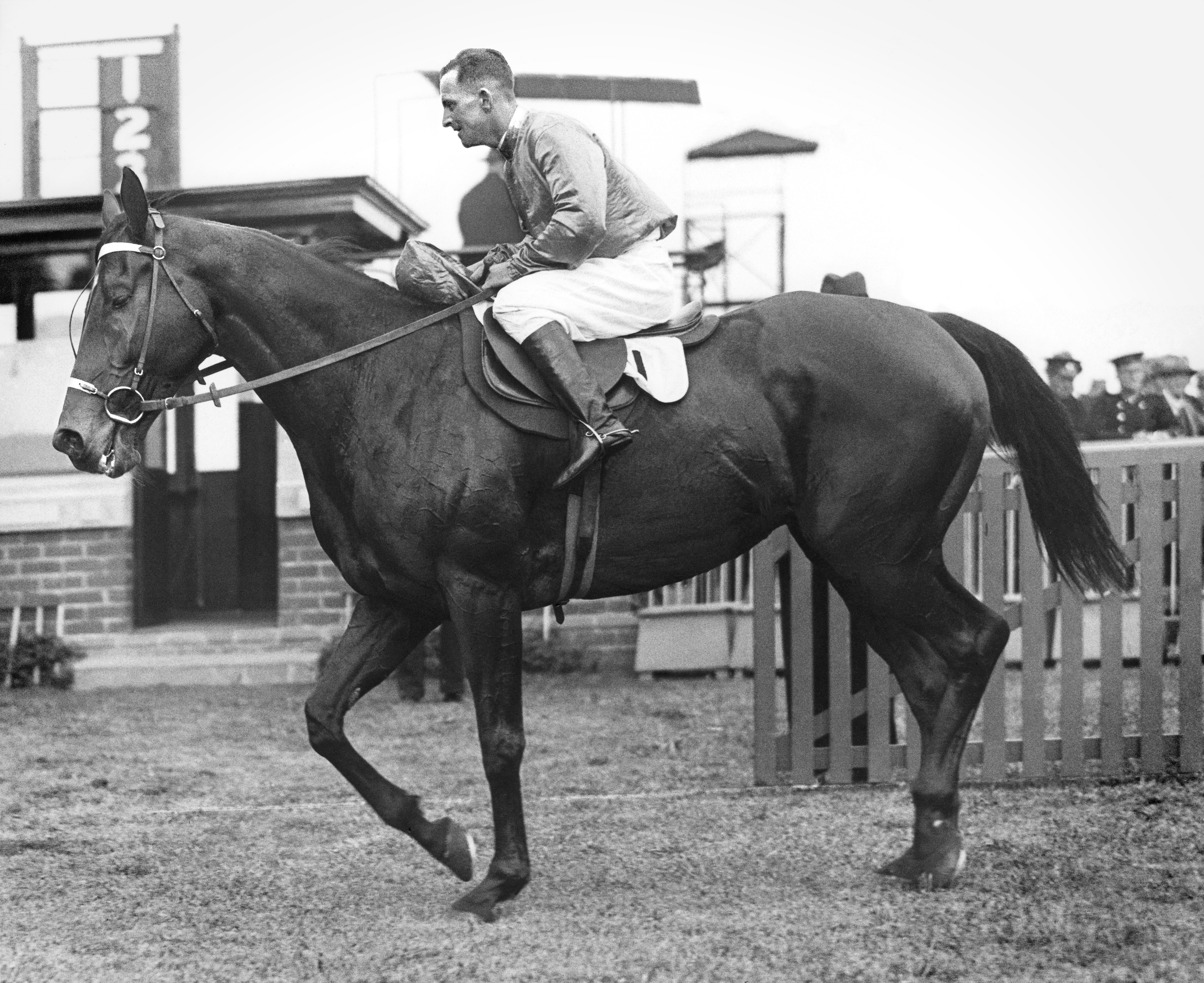
Amounis, 1928 winner, Harold Jones up

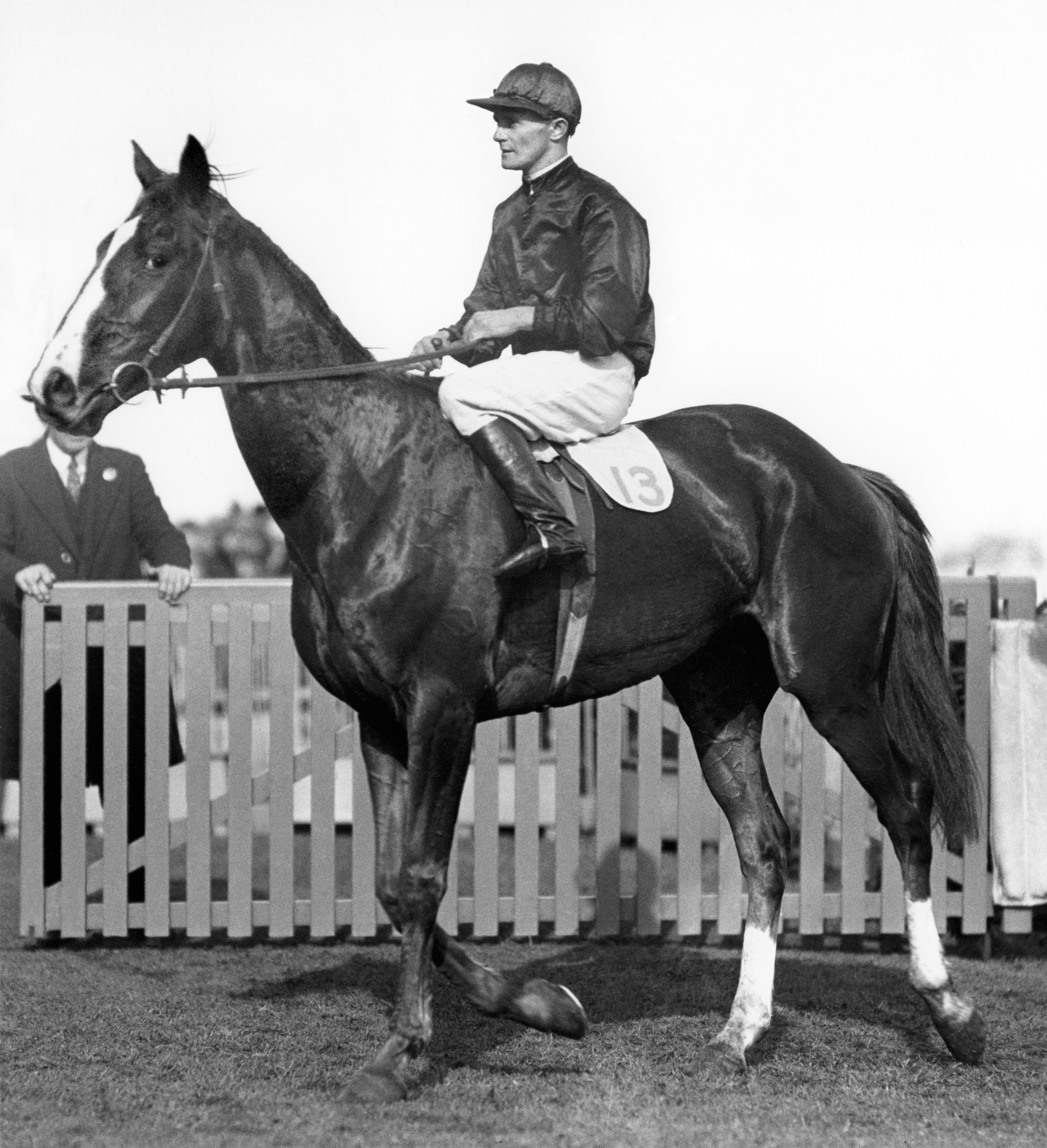
Rogilla, 1932 winner, George Robinson up

=== Grade ===
- 1886–1978 - Principal Race
- 1979–1983 - Listed Race
- 1984–1983 - Group 3
- 2014 onwards - Group 2

=== Venue ===
- 1984–1999 - Randwick
- 2000 - Rosehill
- 2001–2003 - Randwick
- 2004 - Warwick Farm
- 2005–2010 - Randwick
- 2011–2012 - Warwick Farm
- 2013 onwards - Randwick

=== Distance ===
- 1886–1971 - 7 furlongs (~1400 metres)
- 1972–1999 – 1400 metres
- 2000 – 1350 metres
- 2001 – 1300 metres
- 2002 onwards - 1400 metres

=== 1926 and 1945 racebooks ===
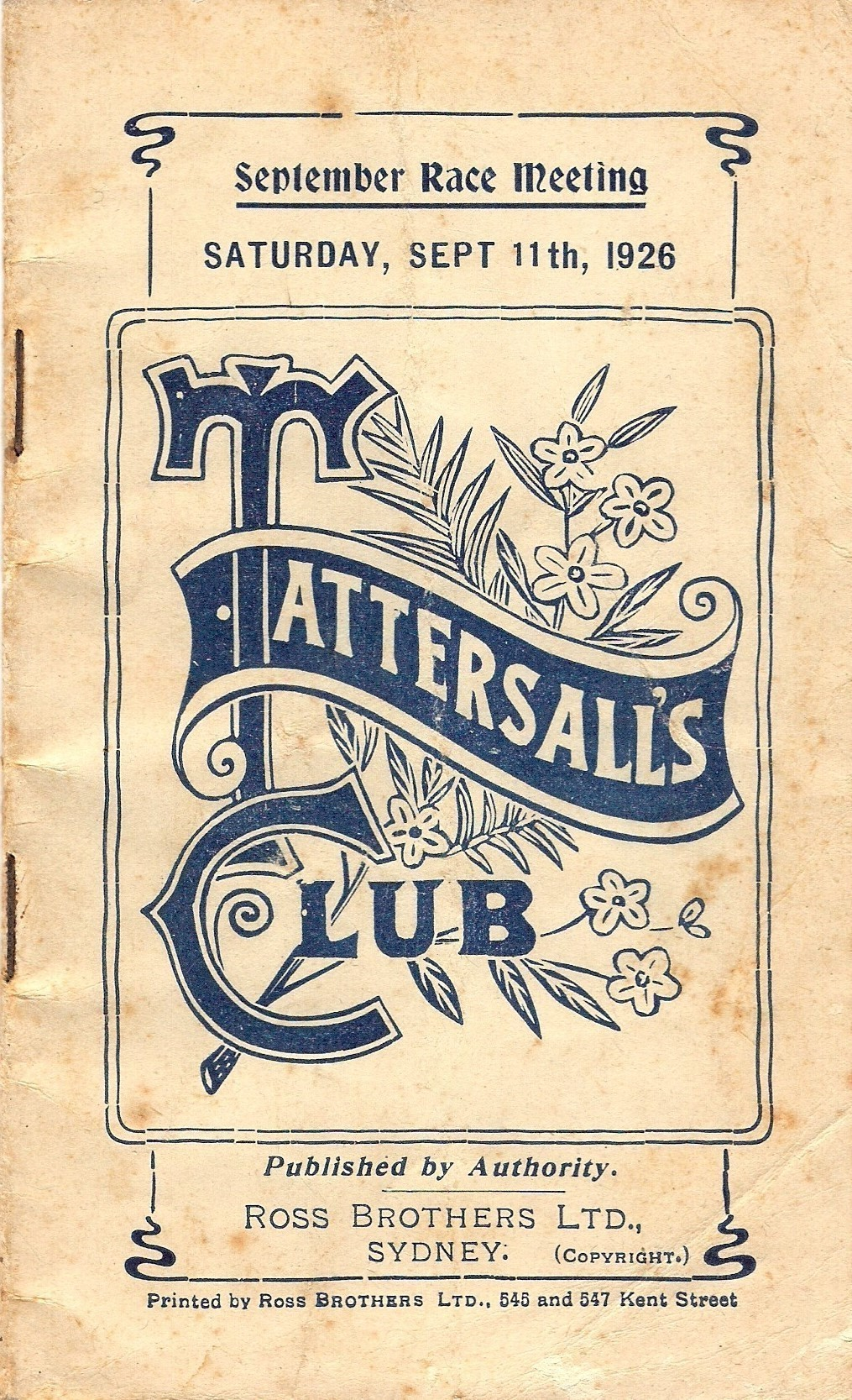
1926 Tatts Tramway Handicap racebook front cover

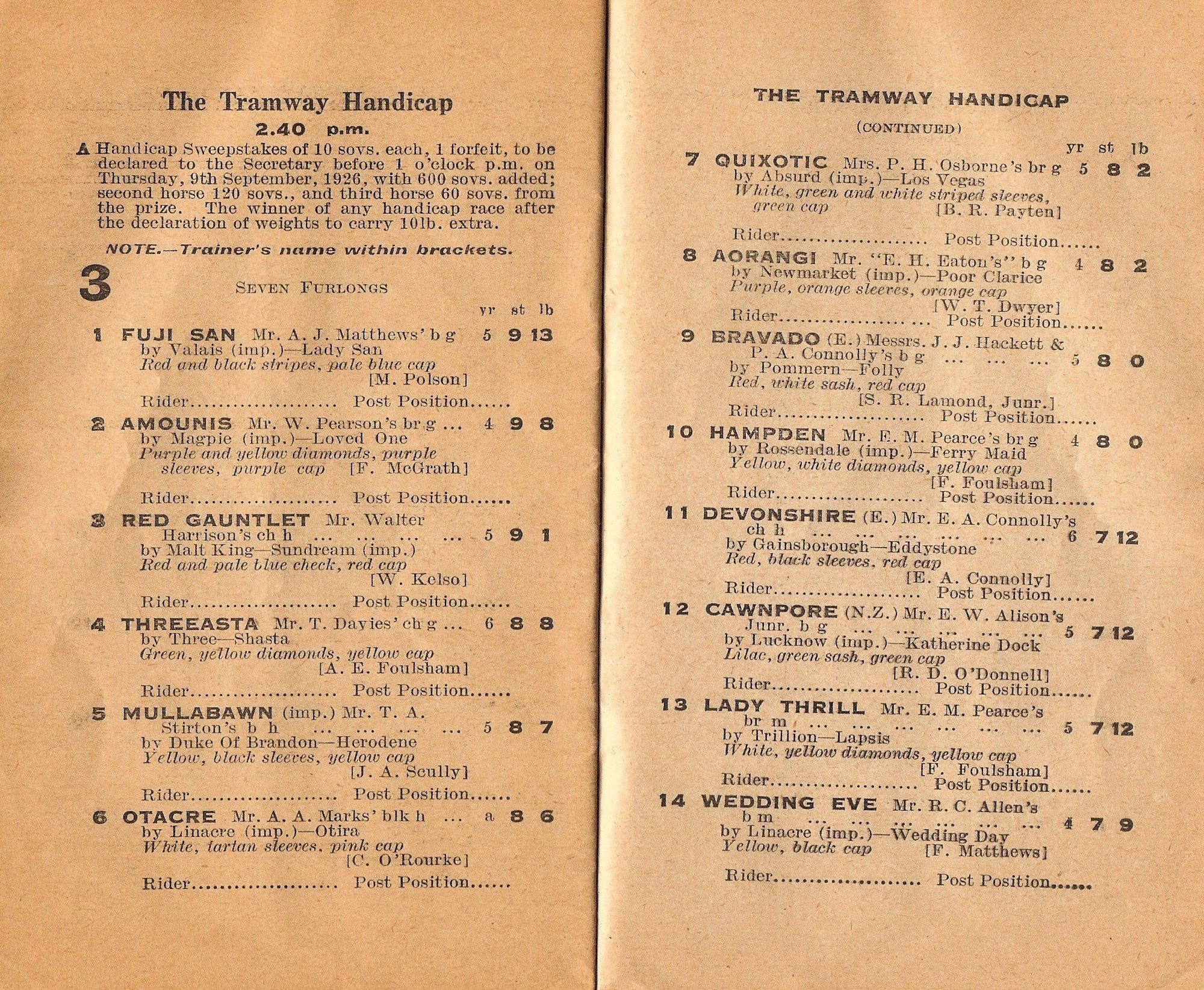
1926 Tatts Tramway Handicap showing the winner, Fuji San

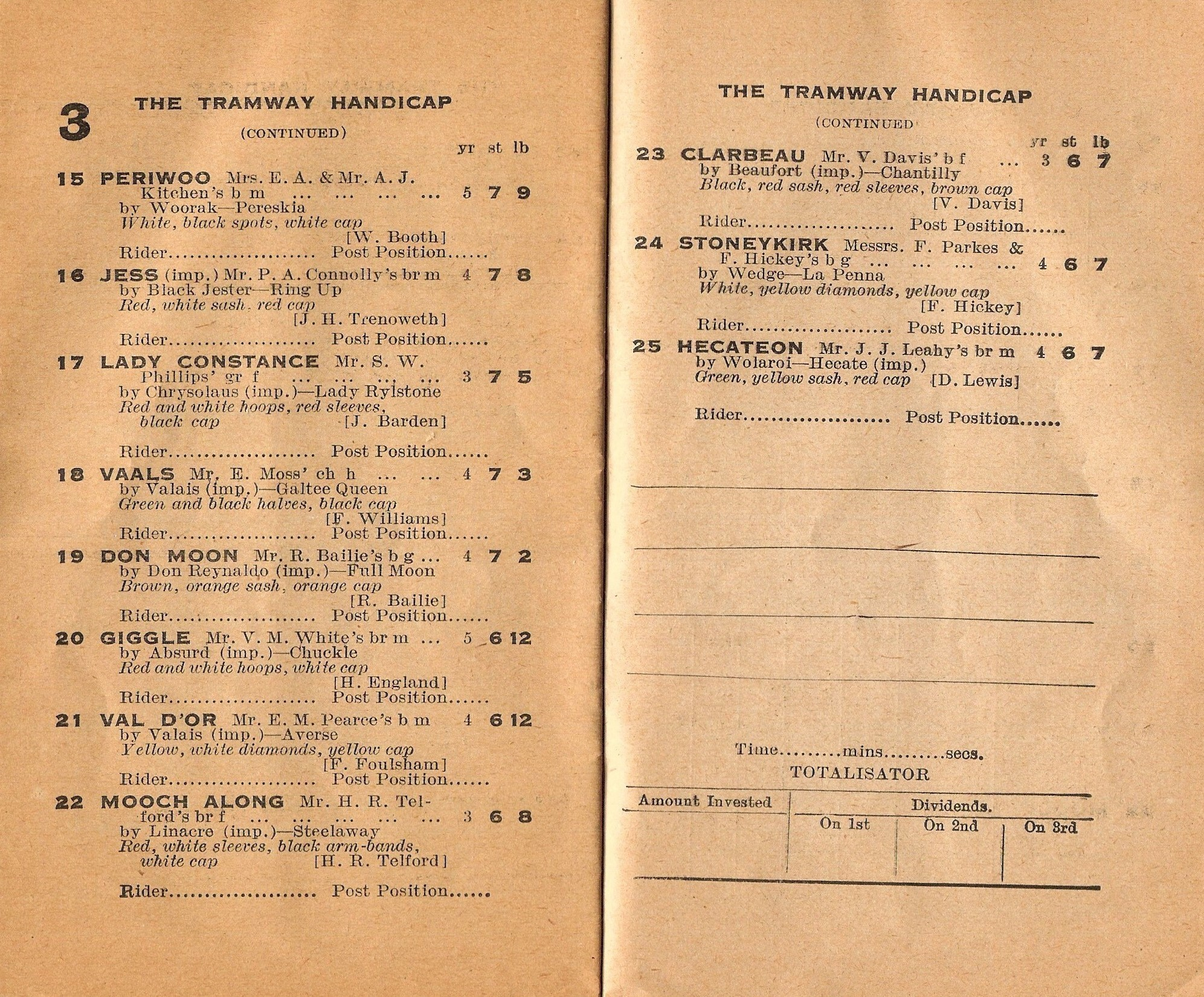
1926 Tatts Tramway Handicap starters and results

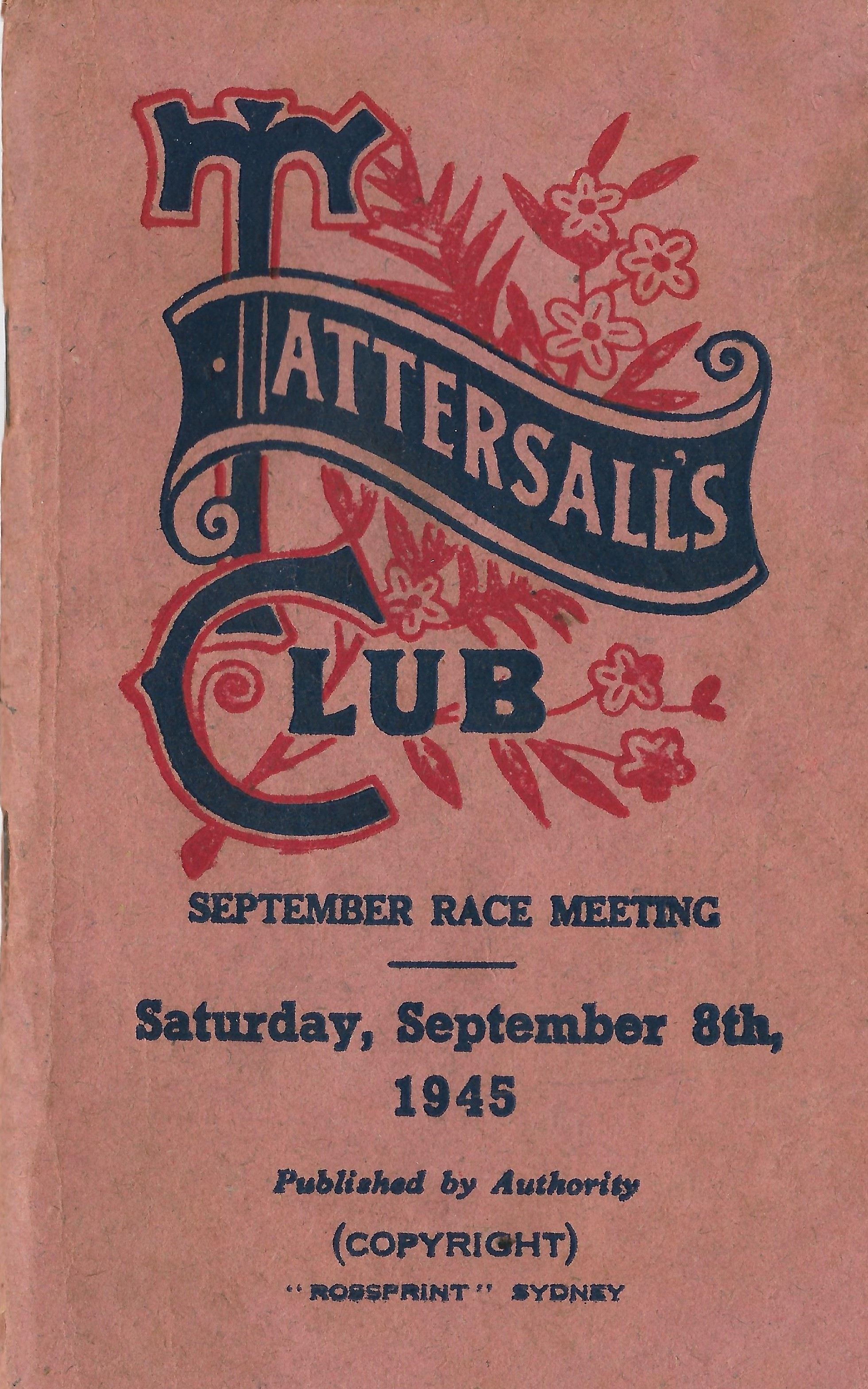
1945 Tatts Tramway Handicap racebook front cover

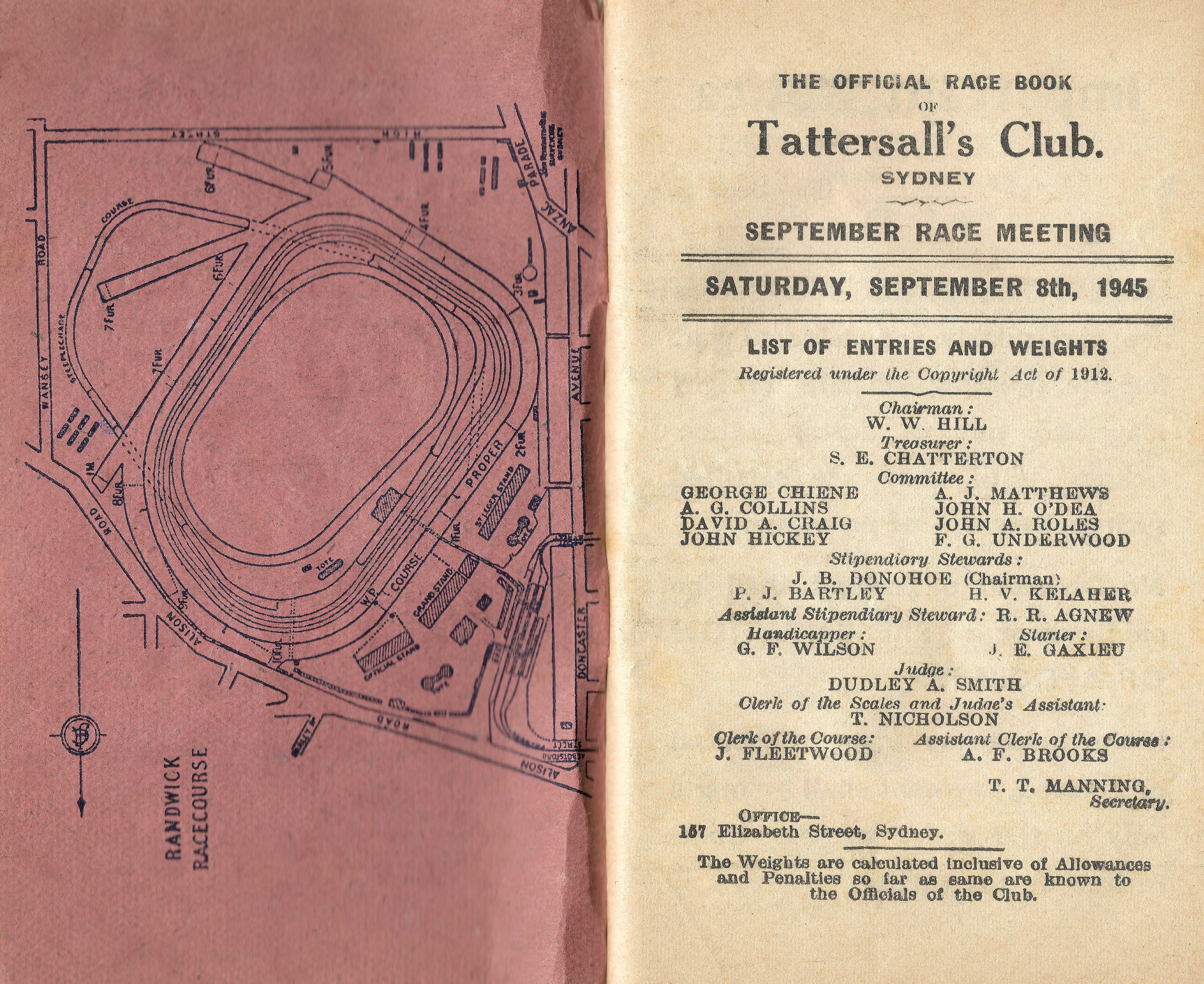
1945 Tatts Tramway Handicap raceday officials

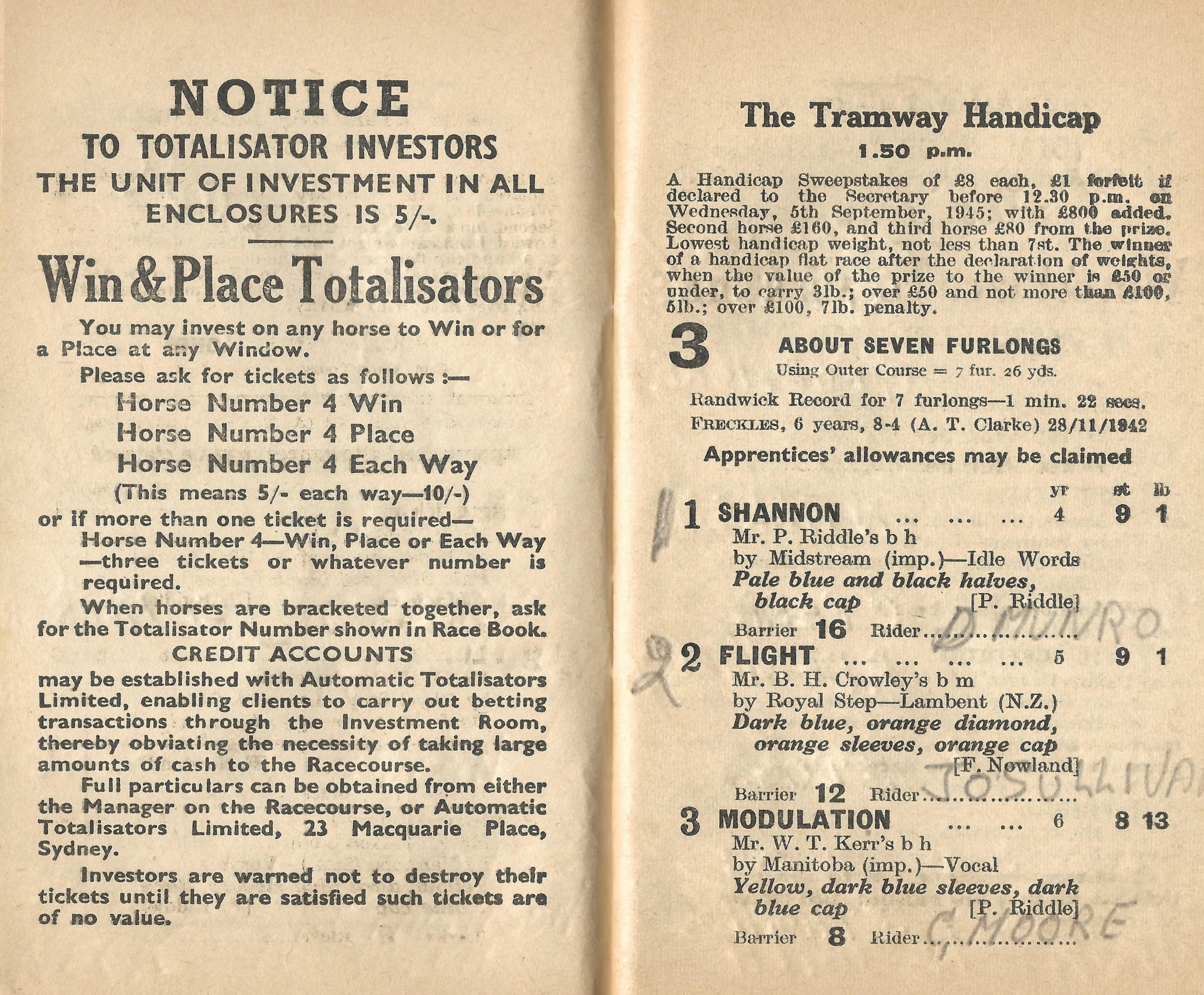
1945 Tatts Tramway Handicap showing the winner, Shannon

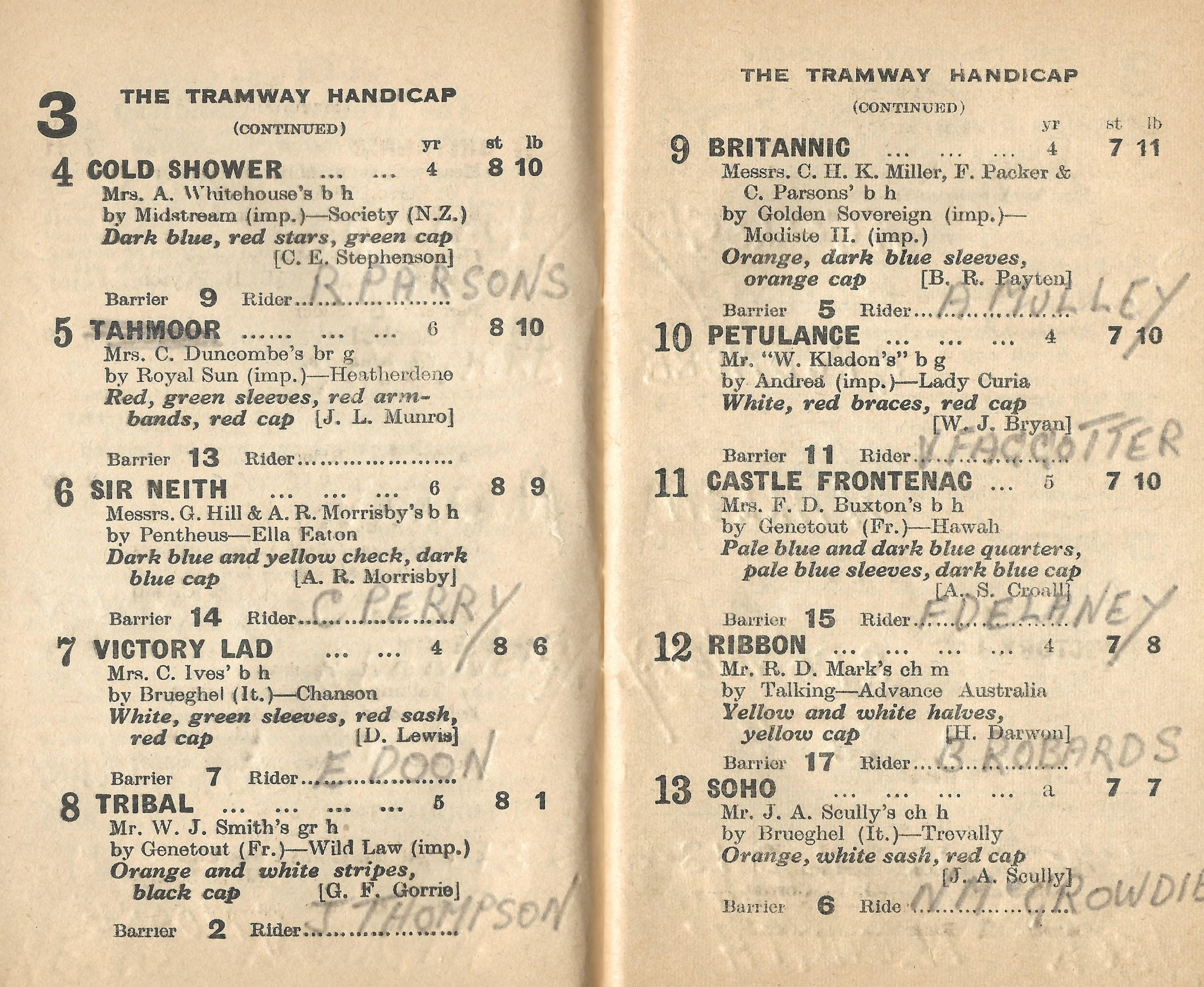
1945 Tatts Tramway Handicap starters and results

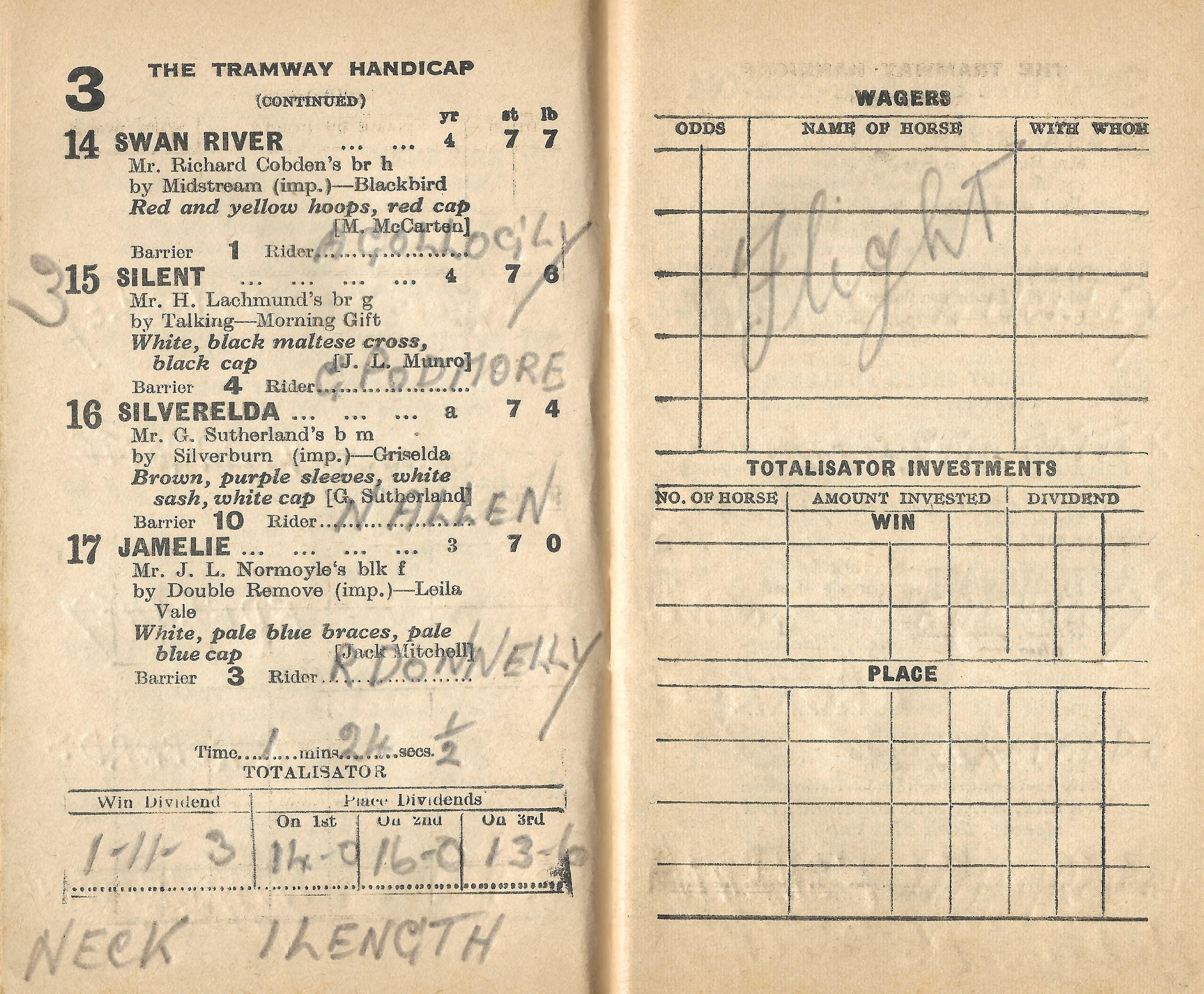
1945 Tatts Tramway Handicap starters and results

== Winners ==
The following are past winners of the race.

- 2026 - Headley Grange
- 2025 - Pericles
- 2024 - Royal Patronage
- 2023 - Pericles
- 2022 - Zaaki
- 2021 - Zaaki
- 2020 - Dreamforce
- 2019 - Dreamforce
- 2018 - Comin' Through
- 2017 - Happy Clapper
- 2016 - Hauraki
- 2015 - Hooked
- 2014 - Lucia Valentina
- 2013 - Malavio
- 2012 - Tagus
- 2011 - Sincero
- 2010 - Neeson
- 2009 - Rangirangdoo
- 2008 - Bank Robber
- 2007 - ♯race not held
- 2006 - Primus
- 2005 - Shania Dane
- 2004 - Nips
- 2003 - Sportsman
- 2002 - Gordo
- 2001 - Diamond Dane
- 2000 - Mr. Innocent
- 1999 - Kinzaffra
- 1998 - Corporate James
- 1997 - Galactic Valley
- 1996 - Peruzzi
- 1995 - Rembetica
- 1994 - Big Dreams
- 1993 - Ghost Story
- 1992 - Cobbora
- 1991 - Moville Peter
- 1990 - Shaftesbury Avenue
- 1989 - Cole Diesel
- 1988 - Gold Trump
- 1987 - Wong
- 1986 - Chanteclair
- 1985 - Double Dandy
- 1984 - Tandrio
- 1983 - Secret Romance
- 1982 - Tuna Too
- 1981 - Winter's Dance
- 1980 - Tullmax
- 1979 - Imposing
- 1978 - Bernard
- 1977 - Party's Pride
- 1976 - Hamden
- 1975 - Summer Fantasy
- 1974 - Navaho Brave
- 1973 - Big Circle
- 1972 - Charlton Boy
- 1971 - Cast Iron
- 1970 - Bermudez
- 1969 - Black Onyx
- 1968 - Royal Rene
- 1967 - Shakedown
- 1966 - Autumn Boy
- 1965 - Uriel
- 1964 - Farnworth
- 1963 - King Brian
- 1962 - Bogan Road
- 1961 - Wenona Girl
- 1960 - Grenoble
- 1959 - Grenoble
- 1958 - Amanullah
- 1957 - Landy
- 1956 - Teranyan
- 1955 - Compound
- 1954 - Bronze Peak
- 1953 - Spearby
- 1952 - High Law
- 1951 - French Cavalier
- 1950 - Humming Top
- 1949 - Buzmark
- 1948 - De La Salle
- 1947 - Clipper
- 1946 - Puffham
- 1945 - Shannon
- 1944 - Prince
- 1943 - Dewar
- 1942 - Gundagai
- 1941 - Evergreen
- 1940 - Tel Asur
- 1939 - Adios
- 1938 - Mohican
- 1937 - Lough Neagh
- 1936 - The Marne
- 1935 - Lough Neagh
- 1934 - Roman Spear
- 1933 - Turbine
- 1932 - ‡Sir Duninald
- 1932 - †‡Rogilla/Chatham
- 1931 - ‡Waugoola
- 1931 - ‡Pentheus
- 1930 - Killarney
- 1929 - Ceremony
- 1928 - Amounis
- 1927 - Mullabawn
- 1926 - Fujisan
- 1925 - Irish Prince
- 1924 - Julia Grey
- 1923 - Vaccine
- 1922 - Rostrum
- 1921 - Beauford
- 1920 - Remmon
- 1919 - Wolaroi
- 1918 - Panacre
- 1917 - Ardrossan
- 1916 - Polycrates
- 1915 - First Principle
- 1914 - Royal Laddie
- 1913 - Gigandra
- 1912 - Gigandra
- 1911 - Grist
- 1910 - Malt King
- 1909 - Parsee
- 1908 - Melodrama
- 1907 - Legation
- 1906 - Pompous
- 1905 - Machine Gun
- 1904 - Mimer
- 1903 - Marvel Loch
- 1902 - Baccarat
- 1901 - Ruskin
- 1900 - Bange
- 1899 - Felicity
- 1898 - The Tola
- 1897 - Blue Vest
- 1896 - Amiable
- 1895 - Blue Cap
- 1894 - Wakawatea
- 1893 - Lullaby
- 1892 - Victor Hugo
- 1891 - Bedtime
- 1890 - Paddy
- 1889 - Merriment
- 1888 - Lady Marion
- 1887 - Glen Elgin
- 1886 - Burrilda

† Dead heat
‡ Run in Divisions
♯ Not held because of outbreak of equine influenza

== See also ==
- Chelmsford Stakes
- Concorde Stakes (Australia)
- Furious Stakes
- List of Australian Group races
- Group races
