= Winning Colors (horse) =

American race horse

- Winning Colors at 1988 Kentucky Derby
- Sire: Caro
- Grandsire: Fortino
- Dam: All Rainbows
- Damsire: Bold Hour
- Sex: Mare
- Foaled: March 14, 1985
- Died: February 17, 2008 (aged 22)
- Country: United States
- Color: Gray
- Breeder: Echo Valley Farm (Donald & Shirley Sucher)
- Owner: Eugene V. Klein
- Trainer: D. Wayne Lukas
- Record: 19: 8-3-1
- Earnings: $1,526,837

Major wins
- La Centinela Stakes (1988); Santa Anita Oaks (1988); Santa Anita Derby (1988); Turfway Breeders' Cup Stakes (1989) Triple Crown race wins: Kentucky Derby (1988)

Awards
- U.S. Champion 3-Yr-Old Filly (1988)

Honors
- United States Racing Hall of Fame (2000); Winning Colors Stakes at Churchill Downs
- Last updated on November 23, 2021

Winning Colors (March 14, 1985 – February 17, 2008) was an American Hall of Fame Champion Thoroughbred racehorse and one of only three fillies to ever win the Kentucky Derby. Though she was registered as roan, she was, in fact, a gray with a white blaze on her face.

== Background ==
Winning Colors was bred by Echo Valley Farm near Georgetown, Kentucky owned by Donald & Shirley Sucher. The couple had previously bred the Hall of Fame filly, Chris Evert. During her racing career she was owned by Eugene V. Klein and trained by D. Wayne Lukas.

Her sire, Caro, was a top-class performer (rated 133 by Timeform), whose wins included the Poule d'Essai des Poulains, Prix Ganay and Prix d'Ispahan, before becoming a very successful breeding stallion. Caro's other progeny included Madelia, Crystal Palace, Cozzene, Theia and Siberian Express. Winning Colors dam, All Rainbows won seven races and finished third in the Delaware Oaks. and was also a half-sister to Chris Evert.

== Racing career ==
=== 1987: two-year-old season ===
Racing on the West Coast of the United States for trainer D. Wayne Lukas, Winning Colors won both of her starts at age two.

=== 1988: three-year-old season ===
Winning Color's Kentucky Derby trophy

In the spring of 1988, the large filly won the Santa Anita Derby, defeating colts her age by 7½ lengths. Sent to Churchill Downs for the 1988 Kentucky Derby, she was up against a stellar field of colts including Risen Star, Seeking the Gold, Forty Niner, Regal Classic, and co-favorite Private Terms. As was her habit, Winning Colors broke fast and raced to the lead. Although Forty Niner made a charge in the homestretch, she held him off to win by a neck.

In the Preakness Stakes, the second leg of the U.S. Triple Crown, Winning Colors finished third to Risen Star, who then won the 1½ mile Belmont Stakes by fifteen lengths while Winning Colors finished out of the money.

In the fall of 1988, Winning Colors finished second to Ogden Phipps' filly Personal Ensign in the Maskette Stakes. The two fillies next met in the Breeders' Cup Distaff at Churchill Downs. Winning Colors had the lead with 10 yards to go when Personal Ensign, who had struggled throughout the race because of the sloppy track, rallied and won by what the U.S. Racing Hall of Fame describes as a "lip." After the race, Winning Colors' trainer, D. Wayne Lukas, said that she had run the best race of her career.

=== 1989: four-year-old season ===
In 1989 Winning Colors raced in her final campaign at age four and won two of her seven races and came ninth in the Breeders Cup Distaff, in a season hampered by breathing difficulties and surgery.

== Assessment and honors ==
Winning Colors was voted the 1988 Eclipse Award for Outstanding 3-Year-Old Filly.

In 2000, Winning Colors was inducted into the United States' National Museum of Racing and Hall of Fame.

== Retirement ==
As a broodmare, Winning Colors produced ten foals and six winners:

- Shbakni, a brown filly, foaled in 1991, sired by Mr Prospector. Failed to win in 14 races.
- Minden Rose, gray filly, 1992, by Mr Prospector. Won one race.
- Golden Colors, bay filly, 1993, by Mr Prospector. Won three races.
- Danzig Colors, bay filly, 1994, by Danzig. Won three races.
- Stormin Winnie, gray filly, 1995, by Storm Cat. Unraced.
- Will Will Win, chestnut colt, 1996, by Rahy. Won three races in South Africa.
- Northwest Colors, bay filly, 1998, by Broad Brush. Won one race.
- Dr Litin, gray colt, 1999, by Broad Brush. Failed to win in three races.
- Ocean Colors, gray filly, 2006, by Orientate. Won three races.
- Silver Colors, gray filly, 2007, by Mr Greeley. Failed to win in four races. Dam of Eskimo Kisses, winner of the 2018 Alabama Stakes.

Winning Colors was euthanized February 17, 2008, at the age of 23 as a result of complications from colic. She was in foal to Mr. Greeley. She is buried at Greentree Farm, a division of Gainesway Farm near Lexington, Kentucky.

== Pedigree ==
Pedigree of Winning Colors (USA), grey mare, 1985
Sire Caro (IRE) 1967	Fortino (FR); 1959	Grey Sovereign	Nasrullah
Sire Caro (IRE) 1967	Fortino (FR); 1959	Grey Sovereign	Kong
Sire Caro (IRE) 1967	Fortino (FR); 1959	Ranavalo	Relic
Sire Caro (IRE) 1967	Fortino (FR); 1959	Ranavalo	Navarra
Sire Caro (IRE) 1967	Chambord (GB); 1955	Chamossaire	Precipitation
Sire Caro (IRE) 1967	Chambord (GB); 1955	Chamossaire	Snowberry
Sire Caro (IRE) 1967	Chambord (GB); 1955	Life Hill	Solario
Sire Caro (IRE) 1967	Chambord (GB); 1955	Life Hill	Lady of the Snows
Dam All Rainbows (USA) 1973	Bold Hour (USA); 1964	Bold Ruler	Nasrullah
Dam All Rainbows (USA) 1973	Bold Hour (USA); 1964	Bold Ruler	Miss Disco
Dam All Rainbows (USA) 1973	Bold Hour (USA); 1964	Seven Thirty	Mr Music
Dam All Rainbows (USA) 1973	Bold Hour (USA); 1964	Seven Thirty	Time To Dine
Dam All Rainbows (USA) 1973	Miss Carmie (USA); 1966	T V Lark	Indian Hemp
Dam All Rainbows (USA) 1973	Miss Carmie (USA); 1966	T V Lark	Miss Larksfly
Dam All Rainbows (USA) 1973	Miss Carmie (USA); 1966	Twice Over	Ponder
Dam All Rainbows (USA) 1973	Miss Carmie (USA); 1966	Twice Over	Twosy (Family: 23-b)

== See also ==
- List of racehorses
