= Premier's Cup (BRC) =

- Class: Group 3
- Location: Eagle Farm Racecourse; Brisbane, Australia
- Inaugurated: 2006
- Race type: Thoroughbred - Flat racing
- Sponsor: Living Turf (2022-26)

Race information
- Distance: 2,400 metres
- Surface: Turf
- Track: Right-handed
- Qualification: Three year old and older
- Weight: Quality handicap Minimum weight 54 kg
- Purse: A$200,000 (2026)

The Premier's Cup is a Brisbane Racing Club Group 3 Thoroughbred horse race for horses aged three years old and older, over a distance of 2400 metres under handicap conditions held at Eagle Farm Racecourse, Brisbane, Australia as part of the Queensland Winter Racing Carnival.

== History ==
The inaugural running of the race was in 2006. The race is considered a major prep lead up race to the Brisbane Cup which is held several weeks after this race in June.

=== Distance ===
- 2006–2014 – 2200 metres
- 2015 – 2020 metres
- 2016-2020 - 2200 metres

=== Other venues ===
- Prior to 2016 - Doomben Racecourse
- 2018 - Doomben Racecourse
- 2020 - Doomben Racecourse

== Winners ==
The following are past winners of the race.

- 2026 - Alalcance
- 2025 - Campaldino
- 2024 - Hezashocka
- 2023 - Kukeracha
- 2022 - Splendiferous
- 2021 - Spirit Ridge
- 2020 - Another Dollar
- 2019 - The Candy Man
- 2018 - Rising Red
- 2017 - Kaiser Franz
- 2016 - Real Love
- 2015 - Faust
- 2014 - Zephyron
- 2013 - Precedence
- 2012 - Fantastic Blue
- 2011 - Shuffle The Cash
- 2010 - Tabulate
- 2009 - Reggie
- 2008 - Rezone
- 2007 - Theseo
- 2006 - Coalesce

== See also ==
- Fred Best Classic
- Kingsford-Smith Cup
- Lord Mayor's Cup (BRC)
- Premier's Cup (ATC)
- Queensland Derby
- Sires' Produce Stakes (BRC)
- List of Australian Group races
- Group races
