= Fred Best Classic =

- Class: Group 3
- Location: Eagle Farm Racecourse or Doomben Racecourse; Brisbane, Australia
- Inaugurated: 1984 (as Courier Mail 2YO Stakes)
- Race type: Thoroughbred - Flat racing
- Sponsor: Mullins Lawyers (2021-26)

Race information
- Distance: 1,400 metres
- Surface: Turf
- Track: Right-handed
- Qualification: Three year old
- Weight: Set Weights; Colts and geldings – 57 kg Fillies – 55 kg
- Purse: A$300,000 (2026)
- Bonuses: Winner exempt from ballot for Stradbroke Handicap

The Fred Best Classic is a Brisbane Racing Club Group 3 Thoroughbred horse race for horses aged three years old, at set weights, held annually at either Eagle Farm Racecourse over 1400m or at Doomben Racecourse over 1350m, Brisbane, Australia during the Queensland Winter Racing Carnival.

== History ==
The race is named in honour of former top trainer Fred Best (died 1990), who dominated Brisbane racing for 20 years into the 1970s.

The race has its beginnings from the sponsor, Brisbane's newspaper The Courier-Mail, which sponsored a two-year-old race in 1984. The race was not sponsored again by the newspaper until 1987, when the race was run for three-year-olds. The race has seen many name changes.

Trainer Peter Snowden holds the record with four wins in this race (2008, 2010, 2012 and 2019).

The race record for the 1350m journey is held by 2007 winner Gold Edition, who won in 1.17.52. In 2019 Military Zone won in 1:22.06 over the 1400m at Eagle Farm.

=== Name ===
- 1984 - Courier Mail 2YO Stakes
- 1986 - Channel Seven 2YO Classic
- 1987–2001 - Courier Mail Classic
- 2002 - Powerhouse Classic
- 2003 – Wyndham Estate Classic
- 2004–2005 – Richmond Grove Classic
- 2006–2009 – BTC Classic
- 2010 onwards – Fred Best Classic

=== Grade ===
- 1996–2002 – Listed race
- 2003 onwards – Group 3

=== Other venues ===
Doomben Racecourse

- 1984–2016 (1350m)
- 2018 (1350m)
- 2020 (1350m)
- 2025 (1350m)

== Winners ==
The following are past winners of the race.

- 2026 - Regal Award
- 2025 - Spicy Martini
- 2024 - Roll On High
- 2023 - Hawaii Five Oh
- 2022 - Vilana
- 2021 - Apache Chase
- 2020 - Dawn Passage
- 2019 - Military Zone
- 2018 - Perast
- 2017 - Niccanova
- 2016 - Counterattack
- 2015 - Najoom
- 2014 - Havana
- 2013 - Platinum Kingdom
- 2012 - Mental
- 2011 - Skilled
- 2010 - Stryker
- 2009 - Court
- 2008 - El Cambio
- 2007 - Gold Edition
- 2006 - La Montagna
- 2005 - Gumnuts
- 2004 - Gallieni
- 2003 - Proudly Agro
- 2002 - Tellson
- 2001 - Marlina
- 2000 - Cryptavia
- 1999 - Mr Innocent
- 1998 - Staging
- 1997 - Crafty Beau
- 1996 - Proud Player
- 1995 - Chief De Beers
- 1994 - Ferragamo
- 1993 - Affirmed Star
- 1992 - Social Rule
- 1991 - Committal
- 1990 - Jonaron
- 1989 - Spot The Rock
- 1988 - race not held
- 1987 - Mirraben
- 1986 - Christopher
- 1985 - race not held
- 1984 - Bonne Princess

== See also ==
- Kingsford-Smith Cup
- Lord Mayor's Cup (BRC)
- Premier's Cup (BRC)
- Queensland Derby
- Sires' Produce Stakes (BRC)
- Stradbroke Handicap
- List of Australian Group races
- Group races
