= Lough Neagh (horse) =

Australian-bred Thoroughbred racehorse

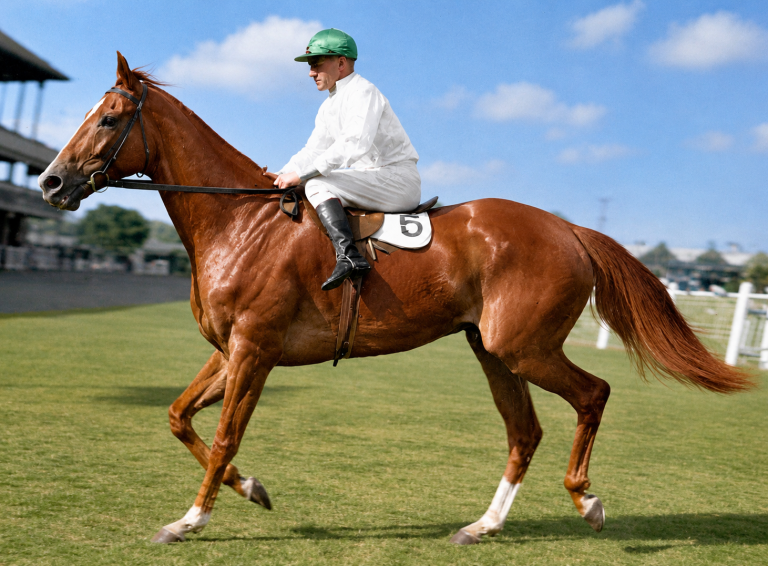
- Lough Neagh and Fred Shean
- Sire: Bachelor's Persse (IRE)
- Grandsire: Bachelor's Double (IRE)
- Dam: Terentia (AUS)
- Damsire: Bezonian (GB)
- Sex: Gelding
- Foaled: 1928
- Country: Australia
- Colour: Chestnut
- Breeder: W. Glasson
- Owner: Tim Brosnan
- Trainer: Tim Brosnan
- Record: 127: 32,23,21
- Earnings: £19,871

Major wins
- Queensland Derby (1931); Queensland Guineas (1931); QTC Sires Produce Stakes (1931); QTC Tattersall's Cup (1932); AJC Randwick Plate (1932); Rawson Stakes (1933, 1936 & 1937); Chipping Norton Stakes (1933, 1936 & 1937); Doomben Newmarket Handicap (1934); Canterbury Stakes (1934); Tramway Handicap (1935 &1937); Brisbane Cup (1936); AJC Cumberland Plate (1937)

Honours
- Lough Neagh Stakes, Doomben Racecourse

Lough Neagh (1928-1945) was an Australian chestnut Thoroughbred gelding, developed into an 'Iron Horse' of the Australian turf by Brisbane trainer and owner Tim Brosnan raced from a two-year-old to a ten-year-old winning on wet or dry tracks recording 32 wins from 5 furlongs to 2 miles with regular jockey's being Ted Tanwan and Fred Shean.

== Breeding ==
Lough Neagh was bred by Bill Glasson of Manapouri Stud on the Darling Downs, Queensland by the unraced sire Bachelor's Persse (IRE) was purchased at the Brisbane yearling sales for 100 guineas and was imported as a yearling by Mr De Burgh Persse in 1914. Dam Terentia (AUS) was bred at the Lyndhurst Stud at Warwick, Queensland by the stud's then owner C.E. McDougall one of Australia's greatest studmasters.

== Racing career ==
Lough Neagh raced between 1930 -1938 during a golden era of the Australian turf and raced for nine seasons winning many major races and defeated the champions Nightmarch, Peter Pan, Rogilla and Hall Mark and holds a rare distinction of being a triple major race winner of the Rawson Stakes and Chipping Norton Stakes. Lough Neagh always spelled in the stables of his trainer and his racing colours were white jacket and green cap also carried to victory by jockey George Moore on The Diver winning the 1948 AJC Doncaster Handicap.

Tim Brosnan's Brisbane stables were located at Charlton Street Ascot, Brisbane he was also the original trainer of the champion Australian sprinter Winooka.

Lough Neagh's racing record: 127 starts for 32 wins, 23 seconds, 21 thirds

== Image gallery ==
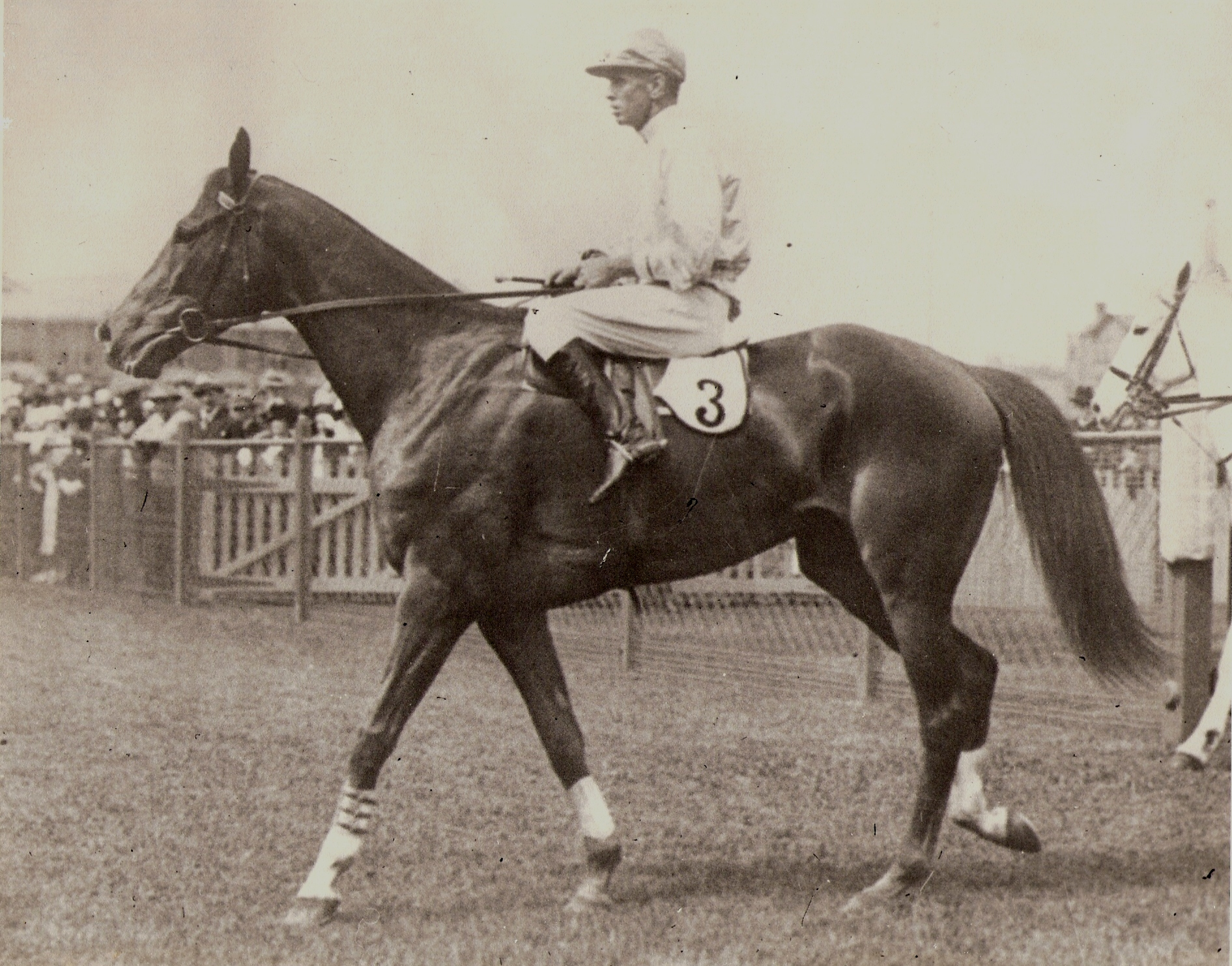
Lough Neagh returning to scale at Randwick Racecourse.

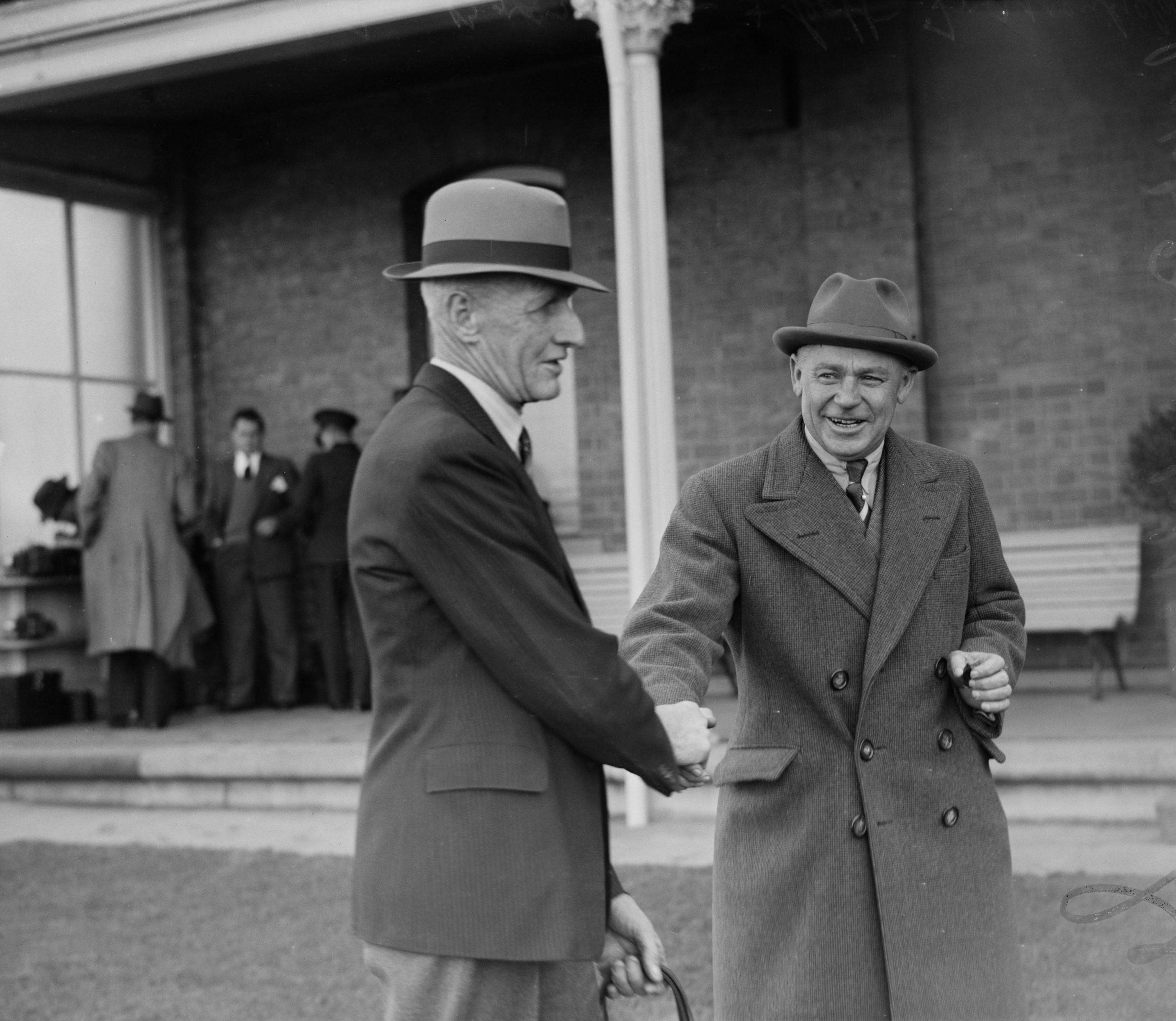
Tim Brosnan Trainer (left) Randwick Racecourse.
