= 1988 Kentucky Derby =

Horse race

114th Kentucky Derby
- Kentucky Derby
- Grade I stakes race
- Location: Churchill Downs
- Date: May 7, 1988
- Winning horse: Winning Colors
- Jockey: Gary Stevens
- Trainer: D. Wayne Lukas
- Owner: Eugene V. Klein
- Conditions: Fast
- Surface: Dirt
- Attendance: 137,694

The 1988 Kentucky Derby was the 114th running of the Kentucky Derby. The race took place on May 7, 1988, with 137,694 people in attendance.

== Full results ==
| Finished | Pgm | Horse | Jockey | Trainer | Owner | Time / behind |
|---|---|---|---|---|---|---|
| 1st | 8 | Winning Colors | Gary Stevens | D. Wayne Lukas | Eugene V. Klein | 2:02.20 |
| 2nd | 1a | Forty Niner | Pat Day | Woody Stephens | Claiborne Farm | |
| 3rd | 3 | Risen Star | Eddie Delahoussaye | Louie J. Roussel III | Louis J. Roussell III & Ronnie Lamarque | |
| 4th | 9 | Proper Reality | Jerry Bailey | Robert E. Holthus | Mrs. James Winn | |
| 5th | 12 | Regal Classic | Laffit Pincay, Jr. | Jim Day | Sam-Son Farm, Windfields Farm | |
| 6th | 5 | Brian's Time | Ángel Cordero Jr. | John M. Veitch | Mr. & Mrs. James W. Phillips | |
| 7th | 11 | Seeking the Gold | Randy Romero | Claude R. McGaughey III | Ogden Phipps | |
| 8th | 8 | Cefis | Eddie Maple | Woody Stephens | Ryehill Farm & Robert Kirkham | |
| 9th | 1a | Private Terms | Chris Antley | Charles Hadry | Locust Hill Farm (Stuart S. & Barbara Phipps Janney Jr.) | |
| 10th | 10 | Jim's Orbit | Shane Romero | Clarence E. Picou | James Cottrell | |
| 11th | 6 | Granacus | Jacinto Vásquez | Patrick Collins | Steve Stavro | |
| 12th | 4 | Lively One | Willie Shoemaker | Charles E. Whittingham | Thomas J. Curnes | |
| 13th | 2 | Din's Dancer | John Lively | Jack Van Berg | Kenneth Opstein, Ward D. & Geraldine Theisen | |
| 14th | 15 | Kingpost | Jorge Velazquez | Dianne Carpenter | Mark Warner | |
| 15th | 2 | Intensive Command | Julio Pezua | John P. Campo | Thomas J. Curnes | |
| 16th | 15 | Purdue King | Kent Desormeaux | Barry Wexler | Bob Starnes | |
| 17th | 14 | Sea Trek | Patrick Johnson | Gary Hartlage | Diana Stables, Inc. | |

== Payout ==
| Post | Horse | Win | Place | Show |
|---|---|---|---|---|
| 8 | Winning Colors | US$8.80 | 5.20 | 4.60 |
| 1a | Forty Niner | | 5.20 | 4.60 |
| 3 | Risen Star | | | 5.40 |

- $2 Exacta: (8–1) Paid $63.40
