= Sires' Produce Stakes (BRC) =

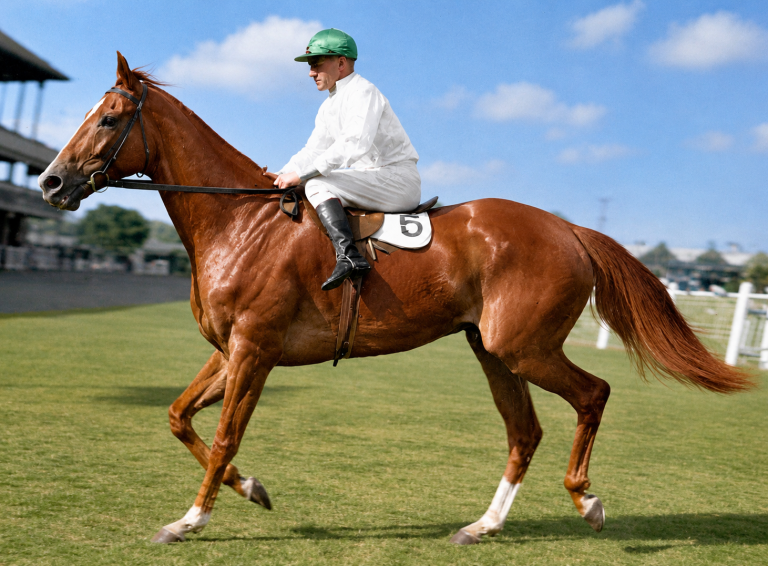
- Lough Neagh, 1931 winner
- Class: Group 2
- Location: Eagle Farm Racecourse; Brisbane, Australia
- Inaugurated: 1882
- Race type: Thoroughbred - Flat racing
- Sponsor: The Straight (2026)

Race information
- Distance: 1,400 metres
- Surface: Turf
- Track: Right-handed
- Qualification: Two year old
- Weight: Set Weights colts and geldings – 57 kg fillies – 55 kg
- Purse: A$1,000,000 (2026)

The Sires' Produce Stakes is a Brisbane Racing Club Group 2 Thoroughbred horse race for two-year-olds run at set weights over 1400 metres, at Eagle Farm Racecourse, Brisbane, Australia during the Queensland Winter Racing Carnival.

== History ==
The race was always held at Eagle Farm Racecourse until 2013 when the BRC scheduled it at Doomben Racecourse for the first time with a slightly shorter distance of 1350 metres.

The following horses attained the Sires' Produce Stakes (ATC) – Sires' Produce Stakes (BRC) double: Tulloch (1957), Man of Iron (1958), Fine and Dandy (1958), Luskin Star (1977), Karaman (1978) and Zephyr Zip (1979).

=== Grade ===
- 1882–1979 - Principal Race
- 1980–1986 - Group 2
- 1987–2005 - Group 1
- 2006 onwards - Group 2

=== Distance ===
- 1882–1972 - 7 furlongs (~1400 metres)
- 1973–2012 – 1400 metres
- 2013–2016 – 1350 metres
- 2017 - 1400 metres
- 2018 – 1350 metres
- 2019 onwards - 1400 metres

=== Venue ===
- prior 2013 - Eagle Farm Racecourse
- 2013–2016 - Doomben Racecourse
- 2017 - Eagle Farm Racecourse
- 2018 - Doomben Racecourse
- 2019 - Eagle Farm Racecourse

== Winners ==
The following are past winners of the race.

- 2026 - Berzelius
- 2025 - Cool Archie
- 2024 - Broadsiding
- 2023 - Cifrado
- 2022 - Sheeza Belter
- 2021 - Tiger Of Malay
- 2020 - ‡race not held
- 2019 - Strasbourg
- 2018 - Lean Mean Machine
- 2017 - Melody Belle
- 2016 - Attention
- 2015 - Look To The Stars
- 2014 - Time For War
- 2013 - Zoustar
- 2012 - Sizzling
- 2011 - Hot Snitzel
- 2010 - Pressday
- 2009 - Shoot Out
- 2008 - Fravashi
- 2007 - Masked Assassin
- 2006 - Danleigh
- 2005 - Virage De Fortune
- 2004 - Star Shiraz
- 2003 - †Ambulance
- 2002 - Lovely Jubly
- 2001 - Juanmo
- 2000 - Reenact
- 1999 - race not held
- 1998 - Dracula
- 1997 - Al Mansour
- 1996 - Anthems
- 1995 - Shame
- 1994 - Aragen
- 1993 - Mahogany
- 1992 - Slight Chance
- 1991 - Chortle
- 1990 - The Guida
- 1989 - Zamoff
- 1988 - race not held
- 1987 - Flotilla
- 1986 - Mr. Shannon
- 1985 - True Version
- 1984 - Red Anchor
- 1983 - Vite Cheval
- 1982 - Star Of The Knight
- 1981 - Faustina
- 1980 - Royal Paree
- 1979 - Zephyr Zip
- 1978 - Karaman
- 1977 - Luskin Star
- 1976 - Romantic Dream
- 1975 - Skirnir
- 1974 - Definite
- 1973 - Zahedi
- 1972 - Merry Minstrel
- 1971 - Charlton Boy
- 1970 - Mr. Consistency
- 1969 - Heroic Isle
- 1968 - Rajah
- 1967 - Prince Gauntlet
- 1966 - Regal Adventure
- 1965 - Maybe Lad
- 1964 - Todwana
- 1963 - Kiwanis
- 1962 - Joliffe
- 1961 - Ivanhoe
- 1960 - Refulgent
- 1959 - Fine And Dandy
- 1958 - Man Of Iron
- 1957 - Tulloch
- 1956 - Duchesne
- 1955 - Malarno
- 1954 - Thurlow
- 1953 - Prince Morvi
- 1952 - Sea Sovereign
- 1951 - Friar's Frolic
- 1950 - Coniston
- 1949 - Mr. Sunray
- 1948 - Real Step
- 1947 - Rayland
- 1946 - Gay Stand
- 1942–45 - race not held
- 1941 - Gartilla
- 1940 - Condor
- 1939 - Brisbane River
- 1938 - Seven Fifty
- 1937 - Spear Chief
- 1936 - Jovial Monk
- 1935 - Auto Buz
- 1934 - Regular Bachelor
- 1933 - Soft Step
- 1932 - Brown Paddy
- 1931 - Lough Neagh
- 1930 - Rhonite
- 1929 - Great Idea
- 1928 - Royal Flavour
- 1927 - High Syce
- 1926 - Budgerigah
- 1925 - Wee Glen
- 1924 - Mountain Song
- 1923 - Ardglen
- 1922 - Lord Highfield
- 1921 - Malt Chimes
- 1920 - Bonnie Wasa
- 1919 - Stable Girl
- 1918 - Sweet Lady
- 1917 - Star Robe
- 1916 - Lord Vindex
- 1889 - Grand Chester
- 1888 - Foreman
- 1882 - Goldfinder

† raced as Lightning Star in Hong Kong

‡ Not held because of the COVID-19 pandemic

== See also ==
- Fred Best Classic
- Kingsford-Smith Cup
- Lord Mayor's Cup (BRC)
- Premier's Cup (BRC)
- Queensland Derby
- Sires' Produce Stakes (ATC)
- Sires' Produce Stakes (SAJC)
- Sires' Produce Stakes (WA)
- Sires' Produce Stakes (VRC)
- List of Australian Group races
- Group races
