= Chris Evert (horse) =

American-bred Thoroughbred racehorse

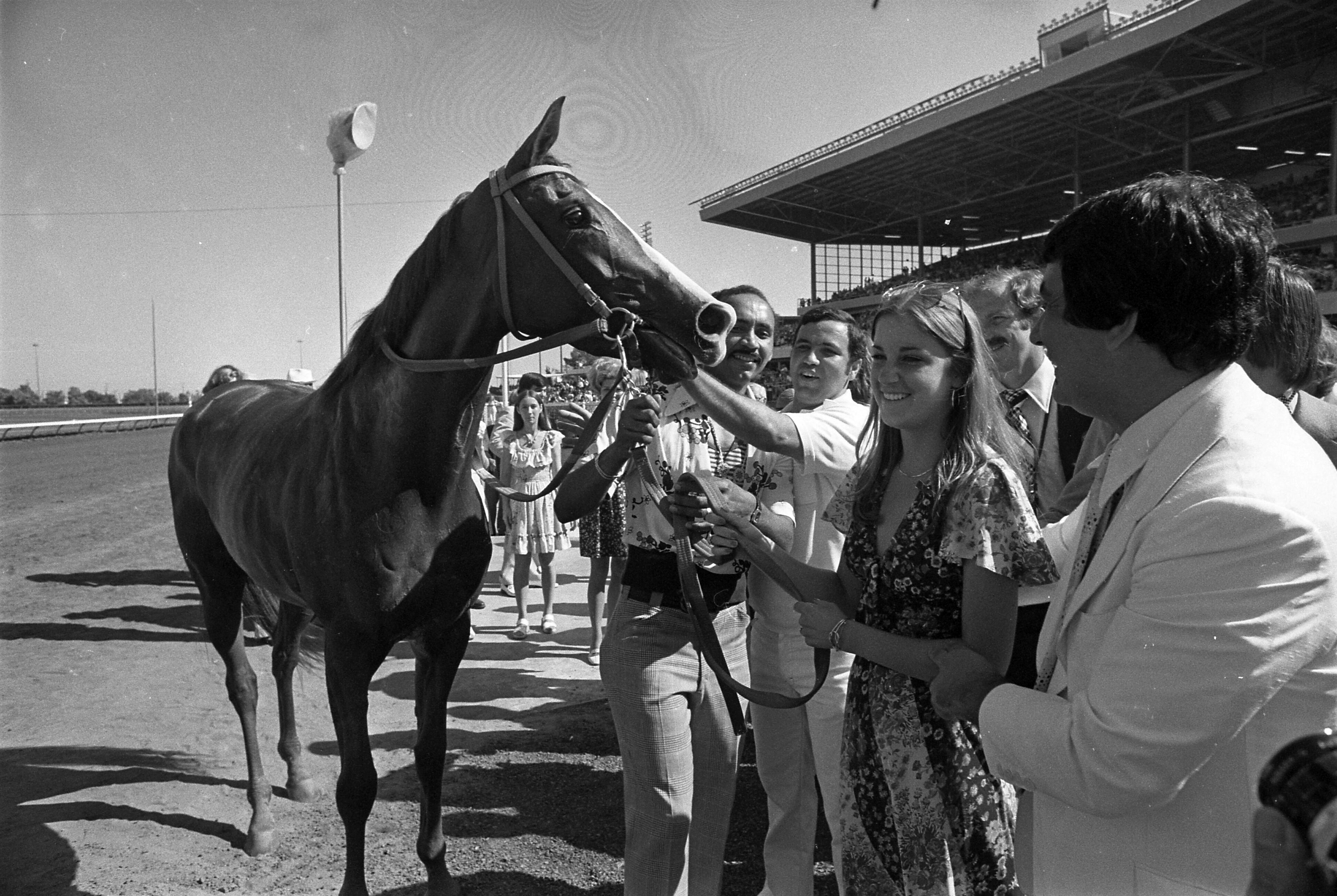
- Chris Evert meeting Chris Evert, 1975
- Sire: Swoon's Son
- Grandsire: The Doge
- Dam: Miss Carmie
- Damsire: T.V. Lark
- Sex: Filly
- Foaled: 1971
- Country: United States
- Colour: Chestnut
- Breeder: Echo Valley Farm (Donald & Shirley Sucher)
- Owner: Carl Rosen
- Trainer: Joseph A. Trovato
- Record: 15: 10-2-2
- Earnings: $679,475

Major wins
- Demoiselle Stakes (1973); Golden Rod Stakes (1973); Acorn Stakes (1974); Mother Goose Stakes (1974); Coaching Club American Oaks (1974); La Cañada Stakes (1975)

Awards
- 3rd U.S. Filly Triple Crown Champion (1974); U.S. Champion 3-Yr-Old Filly (1974)

Honours
- United States Racing Hall of Fame (1988)
- Last updated on November 25, 2006

Chris Evert (February 14, 1971 – January 8, 2001) was an American Hall of Fame Champion Thoroughbred racehorse, winning the U.S. Filly Triple Crown in 1974 and earning the Eclipse Award for Outstanding 3-Year-Old Filly.

== Background ==
Chris Evert was bred by Echo Valley Farm near Georgetown, Kentucky, owned by Donald & Shirley Sucher. The couple would later breed Winning Colors, another Hall of Fame filly and winner of the 1988 Kentucky Derby. Carl Rosen (1918–1983), owner of clothing manufacturer Puritan Fashions Corp., purchased the unnamed filly at a Keeneland yearling sale. He named her for the tennis player Chris Evert, whom he had signed to endorse his company's line of sportswear.

== Racing career ==
Chris Evert began racing at age two. Of her five starts, she won four and finished second in the other. At age three she dominated her class, winning the U.S. Filly Triple Crown and earning the Eclipse Award for Outstanding 3-Year-Old Filly.

In 1974, Aaron Jones, the owner of the West Coast-based filly Miss Musket, issued a challenge to Chris Evert's owner for their horses to meet in a match race. Miss Musket's record included winning the Hollywood Oaks, and her confident owner offered to put up $100,000 if Chris Evert's owner would match it. Hollywood Park Racetrack offered another $150,000 to the winner-take-all race, which it would host and would bill as the Hollywood Special Stakes. Rosen accepted the offer for a match race to be held on July 20, 1974. Chris Evert won by 50 lengths, and the large purse significantly contributed to her becoming 1974's leading money earner in U.S. Thoroughbred racing.

At age four, Chris Evert won two more times but was retired early after competing in only four races. Rosen decided to use her as the foundation mare to establish his own horse breeding operation at Three Chimneys Farm in Midway, Kentucky.

== Breeding record ==
As a broodmare, Chris Evert produced graded stakes race winners Wimbledon Star and the filly Six Crowns, who was sired by Secretariat. Six Crowns in turn produced Eclipse Award and Breeders' Cup Juvenile winner Chief's Crown. Pensioned in 1990, at age 30 Chris Evert was euthanized on January 8, 2001, due to the infirmities of old age. She was buried at Three Chimneys Farm's broodmare cemetery.

== Honors ==
Chris Evert was inducted into the National Museum of Racing and Hall of Fame in 1988.

== Pedigree ==
Pedigree of Chris Evert, chestnut mare, foaled February 14, 1971
Sire Swoon's Son bay 1953	The Doge br. 1942	Bull Dog dkb/br. 1927	Teddy
Sire Swoon's Son bay 1953	The Doge br. 1942	Bull Dog dkb/br. 1927	Plucky Liege
Sire Swoon's Son bay 1953	The Doge br. 1942	My Auntie b. 1933	Busy American
Sire Swoon's Son bay 1953	The Doge br. 1942	My Auntie b. 1933	Babe K.
Sire Swoon's Son bay 1953	Swoon ch. 1942	Sweep Like b. 1931	Sweep
Sire Swoon's Son bay 1953	Swoon ch. 1942	Sweep Like b. 1931	Lady Braxted
Sire Swoon's Son bay 1953	Swoon ch. 1942	Sadie Greenock br. 1933	Greenock
Sire Swoon's Son bay 1953	Swoon ch. 1942	Sadie Greenock br. 1933	Silk Lady
Dam Miss Carmie bay 1966	T.V. Lark b. 1957	Indian Hemp ch. 1949	Nasrullah
Dam Miss Carmie bay 1966	T.V. Lark b. 1957	Indian Hemp ch. 1949	Sabzy
Dam Miss Carmie bay 1966	T.V. Lark b. 1957	Miss Larksfly br. 1948	Heelfly
Dam Miss Carmie bay 1966	T.V. Lark b. 1957	Miss Larksfly br. 1948	Larksnest
Dam Miss Carmie bay 1966	Twice Over dkb/br. 1956	Ponder dkb/br. 1946	Pensive
Dam Miss Carmie bay 1966	Twice Over dkb/br. 1956	Ponder dkb/br. 1946	Miss Rushin
Dam Miss Carmie bay 1966	Twice Over dkb/br. 1956	Twosy b. 1942	Bull Lea
Dam Miss Carmie bay 1966	Twice Over dkb/br. 1956	Twosy b. 1942	Two Bob (Family 23-b)
