= Lord Mayor's Cup (BRC) =

- Class: Group 3
- Location: Eagle Farm Racecourse; Brisbane, Australia
- Inaugurated: 1956 (known as the BATC Labour Day Cup)
- Race type: Thoroughbred - Flat racing
- Sponsor: Sky Racing (2021-25)

Race information
- Distance: 1,800 metres
- Surface: Turf
- Track: Right-handed
- Qualification: Horses three years old and older
- Weight: Weight for Age
- Purse: A$200,000 (2026)

The Lord Mayor's Cup is a Brisbane Racing Club Group 3 Thoroughbred horse race for horses three years old and older, run under Weight for Age conditions over a distance of 1800 metres at Eagle Farm Racecourse, Brisbane, Australia during the Queensland Winter Racing Carnival.

== History ==
The first time the race was run as the Labour Day Cup was on 7 May 1956 as a 10 furlong event on a seven race meeting at Doomben and was held on Labour Day which at the time was the first Monday in May. The race was upgraded to a Listed race in 1979. The race continued to be held on Labour Day until 2003 when it was rescheduled for late April with the name change to Doomben Carnival Cup. In 2005 the race was set to the current name Lord Mayor's Cup and since 2006 the race is on the Doomben Cup racecard. The race has had several changes in the running distance.

=== Name ===
- 1956–1985 - Labour Day Cup
- 1986 - Seven National News Handicap
- 1987–1989 - Carnival Handicap
- 1990–2002 - Labour Day Cup
- 2003–2004 - Doomben Carnival Cup
- 2005 onwards - Lord Mayor's Cup
- 2020 only - Eagle Farm Mile

=== Grade ===
- 1979–1999 - Listed Race
- 2000 onwards - Group 3

=== Distance ===
- 1956–1972 - 1 1/4 miles (~2000 metres)
- 1973–1985 – 2200 metres
- 1986–1987 – 2020 metres
- 1988 – 2026 metres
- 1989 – 2031 metres
- 1990 – 2037 metres
- 1991 – 2025 metres
- 1992 – 2045 metres
- 1993 – 2043 metres
- 1994 – 2046 metres
- 1995 – 2037 metres
- 1998 – 2030 metres
- 1999–2004 – 2040 metres
- 2005 – 2020 metres
- 2006–2011 – 1615 metres
- 2012–2013 – 1600 metres
- 2014 – 1615 metres
- 2015 – 1600 metres
- 2016 – 1615 metres
- 2017 – 1600 metres
- 2018 – 1630 metres
- 2019–2020 – 1600 metres

=== Other venues ===
- Prior to 2016 - Doomben Racecourse
- 2018 - Doomben Racecourse

== Winners ==
The following are past winners of the race.

- 2026 - Athanatos
- 2025 - New Endeavour
- 2024 - Just Folk
- 2023 - Without a Fight
- 2022 - Bigboyroy
- 2021 - Reloaded
- 2020 - Gaulois
- 2019 - Order Again
- 2018 - Duca Valentinois
- 2017 - Col 'N' Lil
- 2016 - Mighty Lucky
- 2015 - Strawberry Boy
- 2014 - Angel Of Mercy
- 2013 - Solzhenitsyn
- 2012 - Solzhenitsyn
- 2011 - Firebolt
- 2010 - Rothesay
- 2009 - Rampant Lion
- 2008 - Rum Dum
- 2007 - Headturner
- 2006 - Cog Hill
- 2005 - Tickle
- 2004 - This Manshood
- 2003 - Restless
- 2002 - Freemason
- 2001 - Sky Heights
- 2000 - Integrate
- 1999 - Joss Sticks
- 1998 - Only A Lady
- 1997 - race not held
- 1996 - race not held
- 1995 - Arborea
- 1994 - Tusk Hunter
- 1993 - Coolong Road
- 1992 - Cool Credit
- 1991 - Comrade
- 1990 - Red Chiffon
- 1989 - Cav Lon
- 1988 - Miss Stephenson
- 1987 - Stars Are Easy
- 1986 - Just Now
- 1985 - Our Compromise
- 1984 - Concord Stage
- 1983 - †race not held
- 1982 - Keep Safe
- 1981 - Sovereign Khan
- 1980 - Our Cavalier
- 1979 - Pay The Purple
- 1978 - Miner's Inn
- 1977 - Rhalif
- 1976 - Our Cavalier
- 1975 - Zasu
- 1974 - El Karpe
- 1973 - All Fashion
- 1972 - Buon Giorno
- 1971 - Gunsynd
- 1970 - Cachondeo
- 1969 - Earlmark
- 1968 - Snatchem
- 1967 - Pavement
- 1966 - Voir Tout
- 1965 - New Zealand
- 1964 - Flash Hero
- 1963 - Emperor's Flight
- 1962 - Brother Mac
- 1961 - Near Light
- 1960 - Drumcondra
- 1959 - Murray Grand
- 1958 - Book Link
- 1957 - Ermis
- 1956 - Cool Gent

† Race meeting was abandoned due to rain.

== See also ==
- Fred Best Classic
- Kingsford-Smith Cup
- Premier's Cup (BRC)
- Queensland Derby
- Sires' Produce Stakes (BRC)
- List of Australian Group races
- Group races
