= Chief's Crown =

American-bred Thoroughbred racehorse

- Chief's Crown's grave at Three Chimneys Farm
- Sire: Danzig
- Grandsire: Northern Dancer
- Dam: Six Crowns
- Damsire: Secretariat
- Sex: Stallion
- Foaled: 1982
- Country: United States
- Colour: Bay
- Breeder: Carl Rosen
- Owner: Star Crown Stable (Andrew Rosen, et al.)
- Trainer: Roger Laurin
- Record: 21: 12-3-3
- Earnings: $2,191,168

Major wins
- Saratoga Special Stakes (1984); Hopeful Stakes (1984); Cowdin Stakes (1984); Norfolk Stakes (1984); Swale Stakes (1985); Blue Grass Stakes (1985); Flamingo Stakes (1985); Travers Stakes (1985); Marlboro Cup Invitational Handicap (1985); Breeders' Cup wins: Breeders' Cup Juvenile (1984)

Awards
- United States Champion 2-year-old Colt
- Last updated on November 29, 2006

Chief's Crown (April 7, 1982 – April 29, 1997) was an American-bred Thoroughbred race horse who won the 1984 Breeders' Cup Juvenile and was voted the Eclipse Award for Outstanding Two-Year-Old Male Horse. He later became a successful sire.

== Background ==
Chief's Crown was a son of leading sire Danzig and Six Crowns, who was by Secretariat and out of the 1974 U.S. Filly Triple Crown winner Chris Evert. He was owned by the Star Crown Stable of the family of the late Carl Rosen, who had owned Chris Evert. They syndicated a half-interest in Chief's Crown to Three Chimneys Farm prior to his Breeders' Cup victory plus another quarter-interest to Claiborne Farm on his retirement.

== Racing career ==
Chief's Crown is the only horse in history to lose all three U.S. Triple Crown races while being the betting favorite for each race. He finished 3rd to Spend A Buck in the Kentucky Derby, then in the Preakness Stakes set a record for the fastest first mile but finished a head behind Tank's Prospect. In the Belmont Stakes, Chief's Crown finished 3rd to Creme Fraiche. He came back later that year to win the Travers Stakes and the Marlboro Cup Invitational Handicap.

== Stud career ==
At the end of the 1985 racing season, Chief's Crown was retired to stand at stud at Three Chimneys Farm in Kentucky, where he died in 1997. He served two seasons in Australia in the 1990s, where he sired 93 foals, including 11 stakes winners with 20 stakes wins.

Among his progeny were the Canadian Horse Racing Hall of Fame colt, Chief Bearhart and the 1994 Epsom Derby winner Erhaab. He is also the grandsire of Sinndar, who in 2000 became the only horse to ever win The Derby, Irish Derby Stakes, and Prix de l'Arc de Triomphe in the same year.

== Pedigree ==
Pedigree of Chief's Crown, bay stallion, 1982
Sire Danzig	Northern Dancer	Nearctic	Nearco
Sire Danzig	Northern Dancer	Nearctic	Lady Angela
Sire Danzig	Northern Dancer	Natalma	Native Dancer
Sire Danzig	Northern Dancer	Natalma	Almahmoud
Sire Danzig	Pas de Nom	Admiral's Voyage	Crafty Admiral
Sire Danzig	Pas de Nom	Admiral's Voyage	Olympia Lou
Sire Danzig	Pas de Nom	Petitioner	Petition
Sire Danzig	Pas de Nom	Petitioner	Steady Aim
Dam Six Crowns	Secretariat	Bold Ruler	Nasrullah
Dam Six Crowns	Secretariat	Bold Ruler	Miss Disco
Dam Six Crowns	Secretariat	Somethingroyal	Princequillo
Dam Six Crowns	Secretariat	Somethingroyal	Imperatrice
Dam Six Crowns	Chris Evert	Swoon's Son	The Doge
Dam Six Crowns	Chris Evert	Swoon's Son	Swoon
Dam Six Crowns	Chris Evert	Miss Carmie	T.V. Lark
Dam Six Crowns	Chris Evert	Miss Carmie	Twice Over (family: 23-b)
