= Queensland Derby =

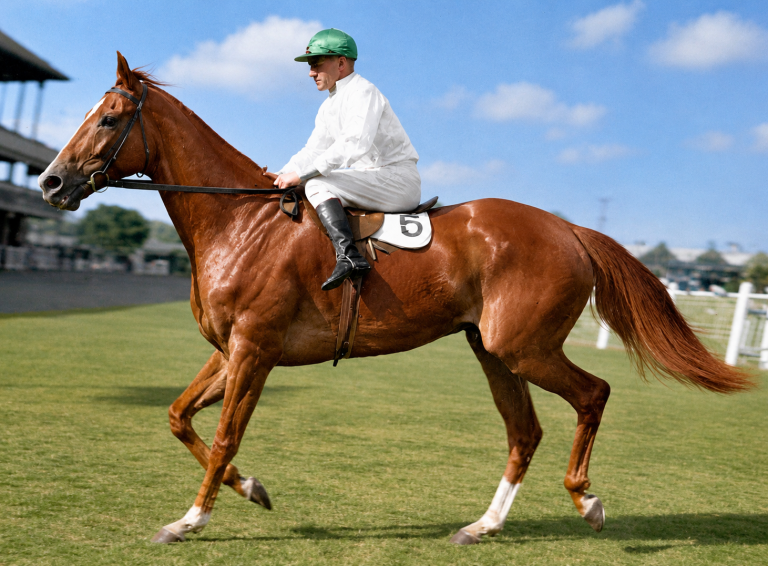
- Lough Neagh and Fred Shean
- Class: Group 1
- Location: Eagle Farm Racecourse; Brisbane, Australia
- Inaugurated: 1868
- Race type: Thoroughbred - Flat racing
- Sponsor: Sky Racing (2026)

Race information
- Distance: 2,400 metres
- Surface: Turf
- Track: Right-handed
- Qualification: Three year old
- Weight: Set Weights colts and geldings – 57 kg fillies – 55 kg
- Purse: A$1,000,000 (2026)

The Queensland Derby is a Brisbane Racing Club Group 1 Thoroughbred horse race for three-year-olds at, set weights, run over a distance of 2400 metres at Eagle Farm Racecourse, Brisbane, Australia in June during the Queensland Winter Racing Carnival.

== History ==
The race was first run at the Gayndah Racecourse in 1868, before moving to Eagle Farm in 1871. The race was held twice in 1870, Grafton winning both runnings.

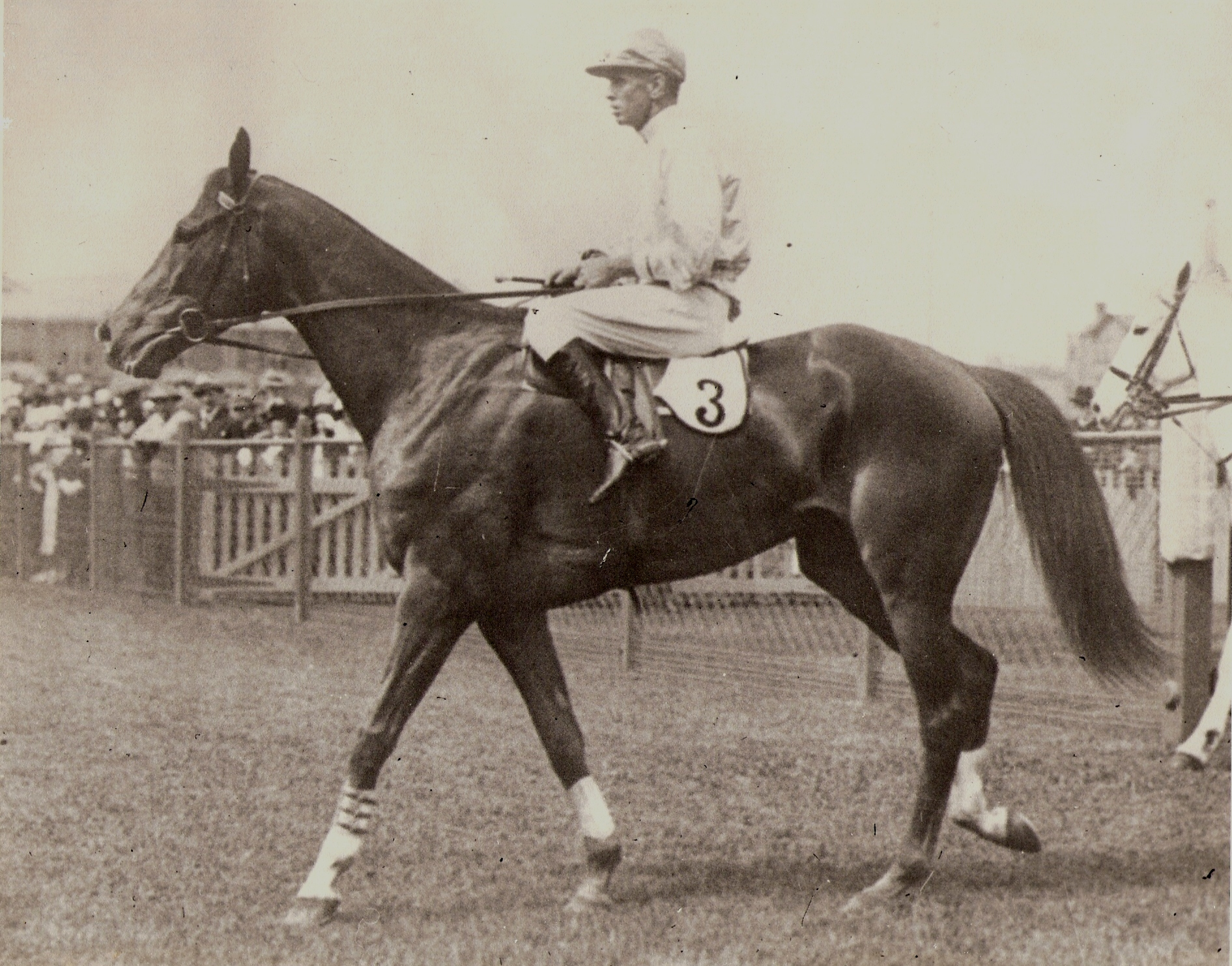
Lough Neagh, 1931 winner

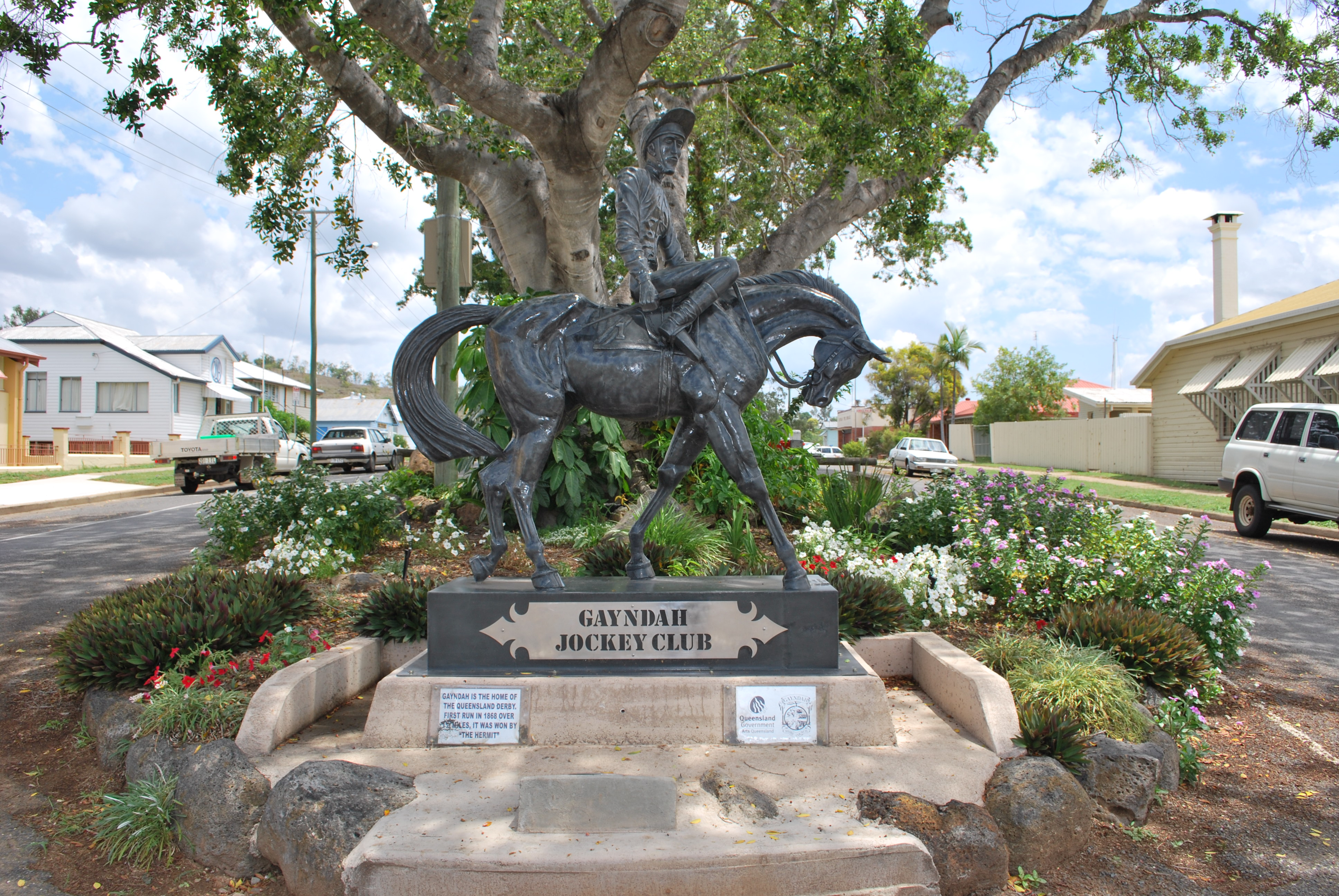
Statue recognising the first running of the Queensland Derby in Gayndah

=== Venue ===
Due to track reconstruction of Eagle Farm Racecourse for the 2014–15 racing season, the event was transferred to Doomben Racecourse with a shorter distance of 2200 metres.

- 2015 - Doomben Racecourse
- 2017 - Doomben Racecourse 2200m

== Winners ==
The following are past winners of the race.

- 2026 - Providence
- 2025 - Maison Louis
- 2024 - Warmonger
- 2023 - Kovalica
- 2022 - Pinarello
- 2021 - Kukeracha
- 2020 - ‡race not held
- 2019 - Mr Quickie
- 2018 - Dark Dream
- 2017 - Ruthven
- 2016 - Eagle Way
- 2015 - Magicool
- 2014 - Sonntag
- 2013 - Hawkspur
- 2012 - Brambles
- 2011 - Shootoff
- 2010 - Dariana
- 2009 - Court Ruler
- 2008 - Riva San
- 2007 - Empires Choice
- 2006 - Ice Chariot
- 2005 - Lachlan River
- 2004 - Toulouse Lautrec
- 2003 - Half Hennessy
- 2002 - County Tyrone
- 2001 - De Gaulle Lane
- 2000 - Freemason
- 1999 - Camarena
- 1998 - Dodge
- 1997 - Yippyio
- 1996 - Valance
- 1995 - Turridu
- 1994 - Tenor
- 1993 - Air Seattle
- 1992 - Royal Magic
- 1991 - Dorset Downs
- 1990 - Rough Habit
- 1989 - Hidden Rhythm
- 1988 - Bravery
- 1987 - Princess Gracious
- 1986 - Handy Proverb
- 1985 - Tristina
- 1984 - Librici
- 1983 - Strawberry Road
- 1982 - Our Planet
- 1981 - Mr. Cromwell
- 1980 - Kingston Town
- 1979 - Double Century
- 1978 - Lefroy
- 1977 - Florissa
- 1976 - Cheyne Walk
- 1975 - Bottled Sunshine
- 1974 - Count Rapier
- 1973 - Analie
- 1972 - race not held
- 1971 - Amby's Love
- 1970 - Silver Sharpe
- 1969 - Intrepid Clipper
- 1968 - Tails
- 1967 - Minto Crag
- 1966 - Dark Briar
- 1965 - Bahram Star
- 1964 - Royal Sovereign
- 1963 - Confidence
- 1962 - Honest Man
- 1961 - Raajpoot
- 1960 - Persian Lyric
- 1959 -Travel Boy
- 1958 - Earlwood
- 1957 - Tulloch
- 1956 - Book Link
- 1955 - Regal Dignity
- 1954 - The Wash
- 1953 - Castillo
- 1952 - Headstockman
- 1951 - Forest Beau
- 1950 - Basha Felika
- 1949 - Pocket Money
- 1948 - Blue Slipper
- 1947 - Sefiona
- 1946 - Te Tana
- 1942–45 - race not held
- 1941 - Lord Spear
- 1940 - Fearless Fox
- 1939 - Spearace
- 1938 - Hendra Lad
- 1937 - Spear Chief
- 1936 - Six Fifty
- 1935 - Auto Buz
- 1934 - Glen's Spear
- 1933 - Waikare
- 1932 - Braeburn
- 1931 - Lough Neagh
- 1930 - Monash Valley
- 1929 - Bernfield
- 1928 - Paddi Eve
- 1927 - High Syce
- 1926 - Kitty Paddington
- 1925 - Wee Glen
- 1924 - Serelot
- 1923 - Ardglen
- 1922 - Kingslot
- 1921 - Lawn Mower
- 1920 - Seremist
- 1919 - Boy Syce
- 1918 - Syce Lad
- 1917 - Symposium
- 1916 - Lord Acre
- 1915 - Rascasse
- 1914 - Fog Bell
- 1913 - Signal Lamp
- 1912 - King Cleo
- 1911 - Maritoria
- 1910 - Persian Jewel
- 1909 - Braw Laddie
- 1908 - Flaxen
- 1907 - Euroa
- 1906 - Togo
- 1905 - Alexis
- 1904 - Joyance
- 1903 - Fitz Grafton
- 1902 - Balfour
- 1901 - Narelle
- 1900 - Musket
- 1899 - Master Bernie
- 1898 - Boreas II
- 1897 - The Guard
- 1896 - Greyleg
- 1895 - Black Diamond
- 1894 - Czarina
- 1893 - Triton
- 1892 - Tridentate
- 1891 - Splendide
- 1890 - Garuda
- 1889 - Fernando
- 1888 - Greywing
- 1887 - Lord Headington
- 1886 - Fano
- 1885 - Elbe
- 1884 - Petronel
- 1883 - Wheatmeat
- 1882 - Goldfinder
- 1881 - Legerdemain
- 1880 - Waterloo
- 1879 - Elastic
- 1878 - Whisker
- 1873–77 - race not held
- 1872 - J.L.
- 1871 - Florence
- 1870 - Grafton
- 1870 - Grafton
- 1869 - Zambesi
- 1868 - Hermit

‡ Not held because of the COVID-19 pandemic in Australia

== See also ==
- Brisbane Cup
- Dane Ripper Stakes
- Fred Best Classic
- J. J. Atkins
- Kingsford-Smith Cup
- Lord Mayor's Cup (BRC)
- Moreton Cup
- Premier's Cup (BRC)
- Queensland Guineas
- Queensland Oaks
- Sires' Produce Stakes (BRC)
- Stradbroke Handicap
- List of Australian Group races
- Group races
