= Swoon's Son =

American-bred Thoroughbred racehorse

- Sire: The Doge
- Grandsire: Bull Dog
- Dam: Swoon
- Damsire: Sweep Like
- Sex: Stallion
- Foaled: 1953
- Country: United States
- Color: Bay
- Breeder: E. Gay Drake
- Owner: E. Gay Drake
- Trainer: Lex Wilson
- Record: 51: 30-10-3
- Earnings: $970,605

Major wins
- Arlington Futurity (1955); Washington Park Futurity (1955); Bashford Manor Stakes (1955); Charles W. Bidwill Memorial Handicap (1957); American Derby (1956); Arlington Classic (1956); Clark Handicap (1956); Warren Wright Memorial Handicap (1956, 1957); Churchill Downs Handicap (1957); Equipoise Mile Handicap (1957, 1958)

Honors
- U.S. Racing Hall of Fame (2007)

Swoon's Son (February 13, 1953 – 1977) is an American Hall of Fame Thoroughbred racehorse. He was bred and raced by E. Gay Drake, owner of Mineola Stock Farm in Lexington, Kentucky and a charter member of the Thoroughbred Club of America.

Ridden by jockey David Erb in all but one of his twenty-two stakes race wins, Swoon's Son set track records at a sprint distance at Keeneland Race Course in Lexington and in the seven-furlong Warren Wright Memorial Handicap at Chicago's Arlington Park. As well, he set a track record at a distance of around one mile on turf and dirt at Chicago's Washington Park Race Track and at 1 1/8 miles in the Charles W. Bidwill Memorial Handicap at Hawthorne Race Course. He raced for four years from 1955 through 1958 before being retired to stud duty at Mineola Stock Farm in January 1959. Of his offspring, the most famous is the filly Chris Evert who too would become a U.S. Racing Hall of Fame inductee.

Swoon's Son died at Mineola Stock Farm in 1977 and is buried there in the farm's equine cemetery. In 2007, his racing career was honored with induction in the National Museum of Racing and Hall of Fame.

== Pedigree ==
Pedigree of Swoon's Son, Bay Stallion, 1953
Sire The Doge	Bull Dog	Teddy	Ajax
Sire The Doge	Bull Dog	Teddy	Rondeau
Sire The Doge	Bull Dog	Plucky Liege	Spearmint
Sire The Doge	Bull Dog	Plucky Liege	Concertina
Sire The Doge	My Auntie	Busy American	North Star
Sire The Doge	My Auntie	Busy American	Breathing Spell
Sire The Doge	My Auntie	Babe K.	Leonardo
Sire The Doge	My Auntie	Babe K.	Cri de Coeur
Dam Swoon	Sweep Like	Sweep	Ben Brush
Dam Swoon	Sweep Like	Sweep	Pink Domino
Dam Swoon	Sweep Like	Lady Braxted	Braxted
Dam Swoon	Sweep Like	Lady Braxted	Frummenty
Dam Swoon	Sadie Greenock	Greenock	The Porter
Dam Swoon	Sadie Greenock	Greenock	Starella
Dam Swoon	Sadie Greenock	Silk Lady	Ormondale
Dam Swoon	Sadie Greenock	Silk Lady	Silk Maid (family: 12-b)
