= Darby Munro =

Australian jockey (1913–1966)

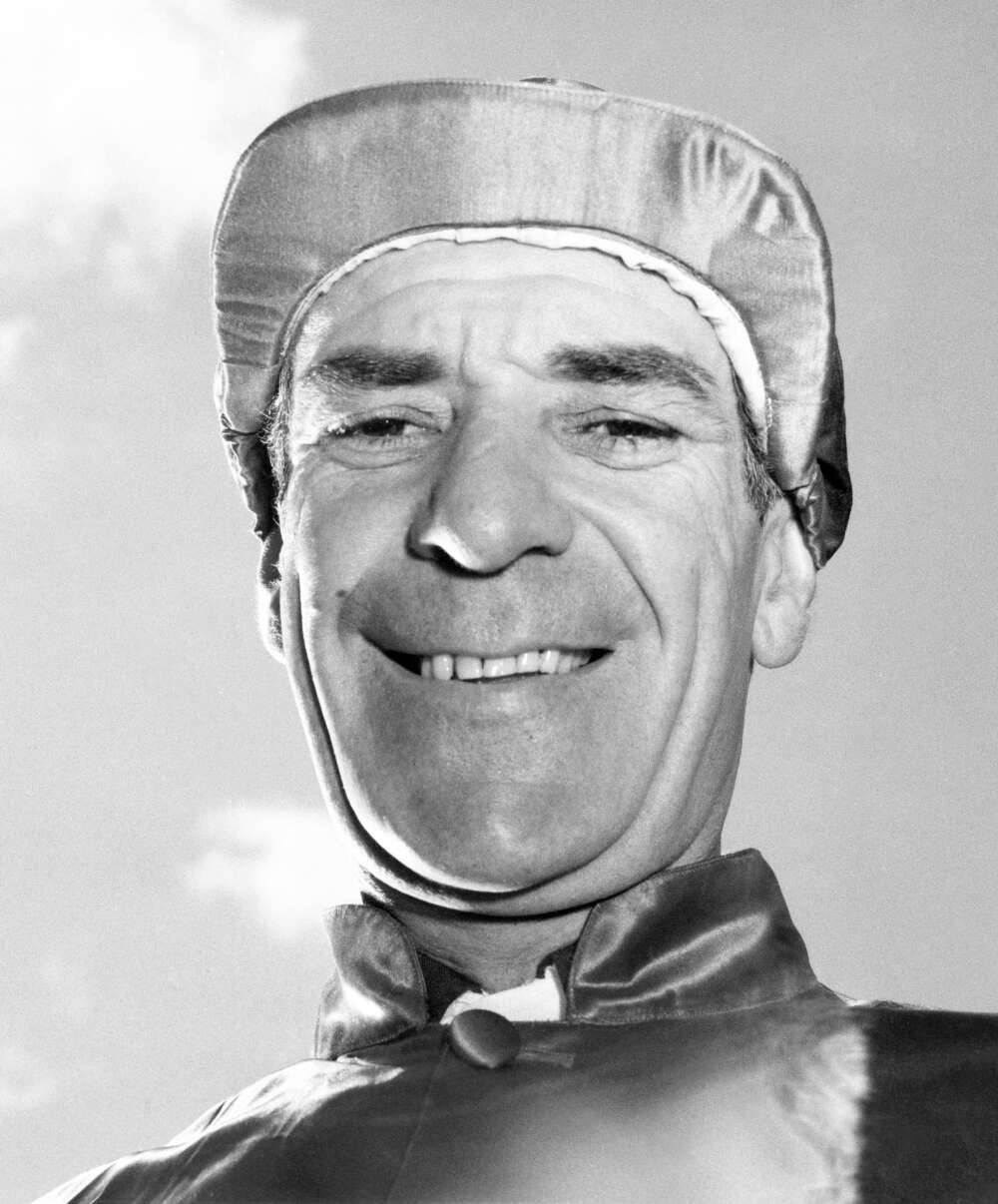
- Darby Munro, Randwick 1952

Personal information
- Nicknames: Brown Bomber, the Demon,
- Nationality: Australian
- Born: David Hugh Munro; 5 March 1913 Caulfield, Victoria, Australia
- Died: 3 April 1966 (aged 53) Sydney, Australia
- Education: Marist Brothers' College, Randwick
- Occupation: Jockey

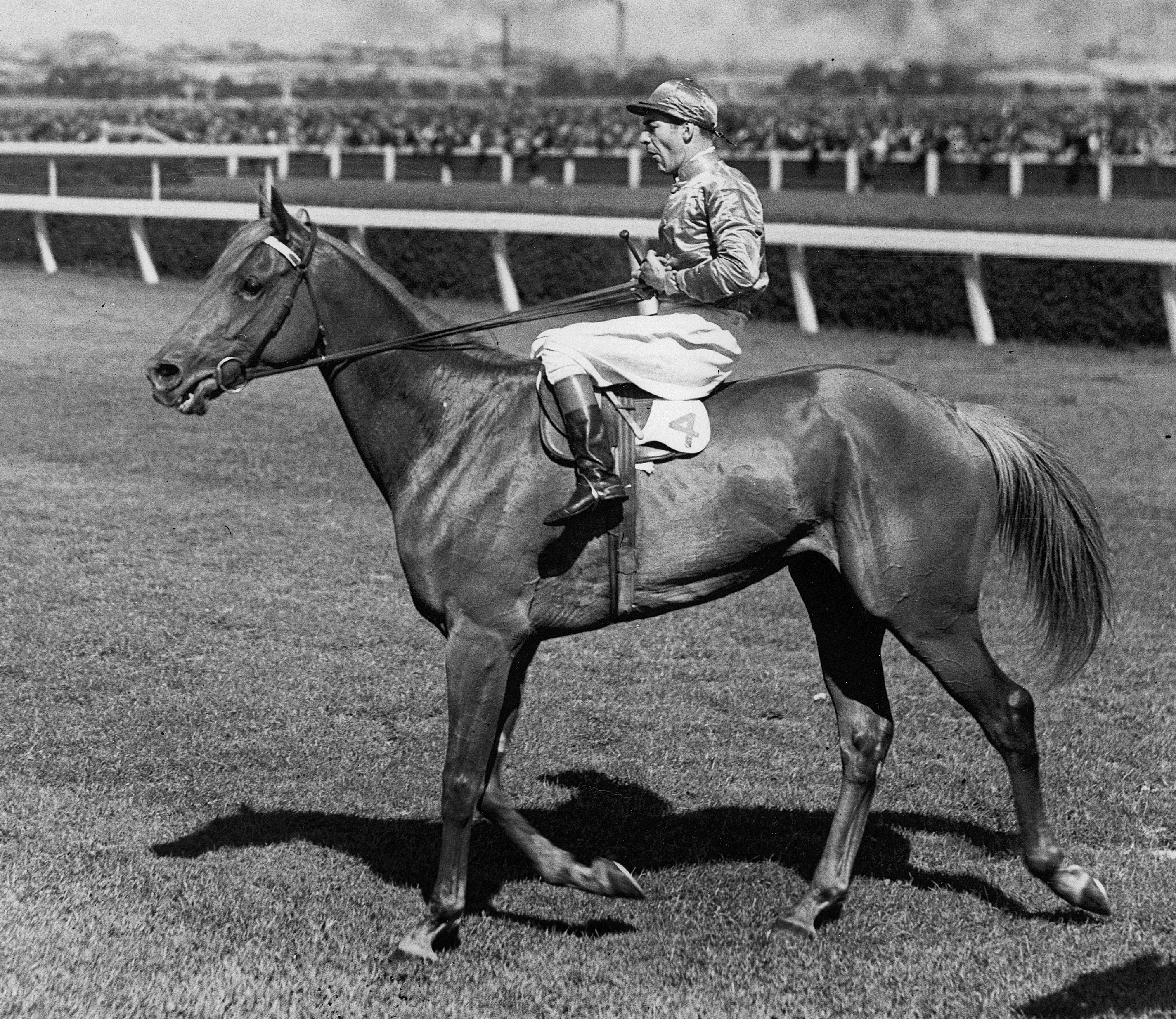
Peter Pan and Darby Munro, at Flemington.

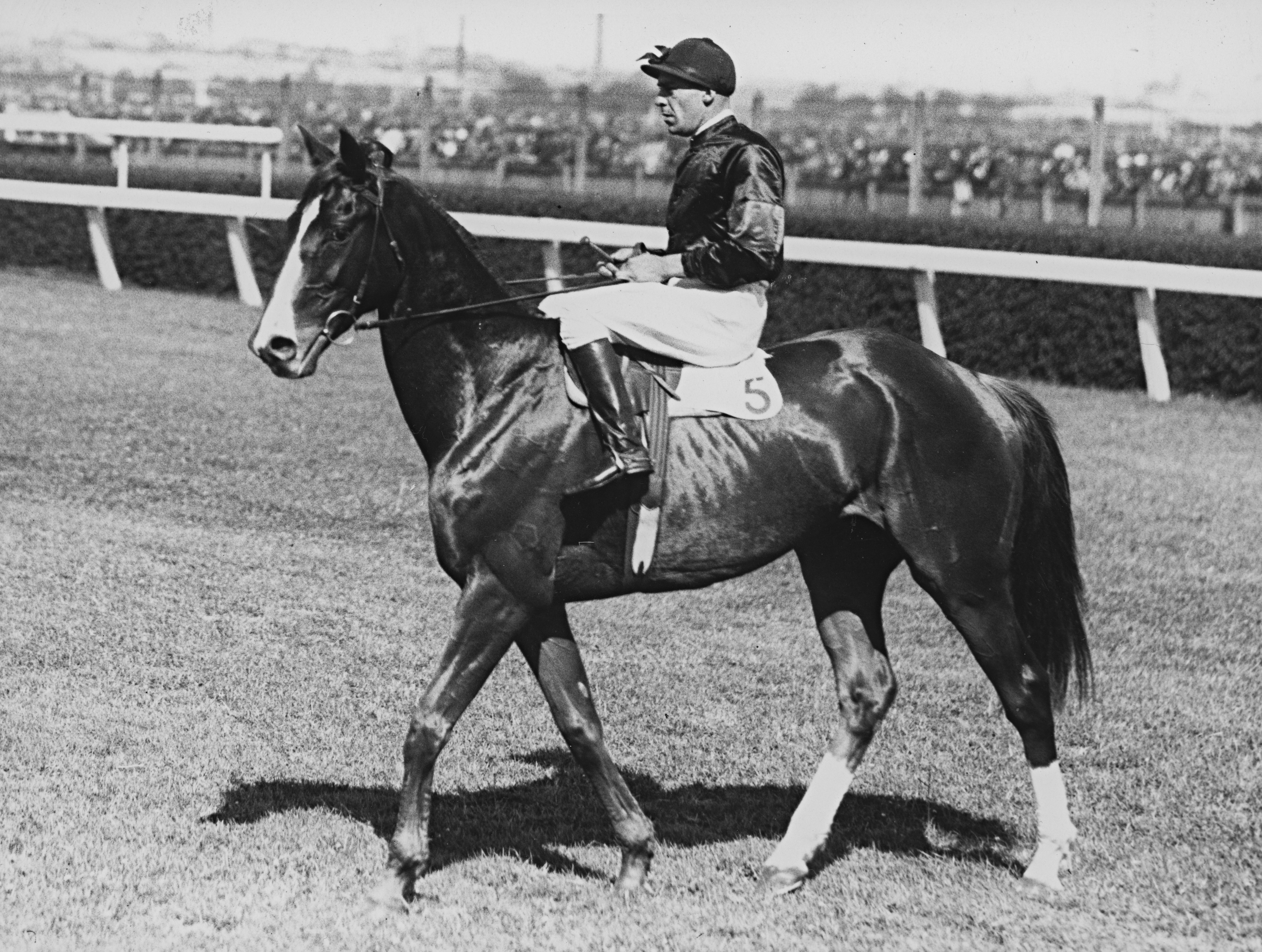
Rogilla and Darby Munro at Flemington.

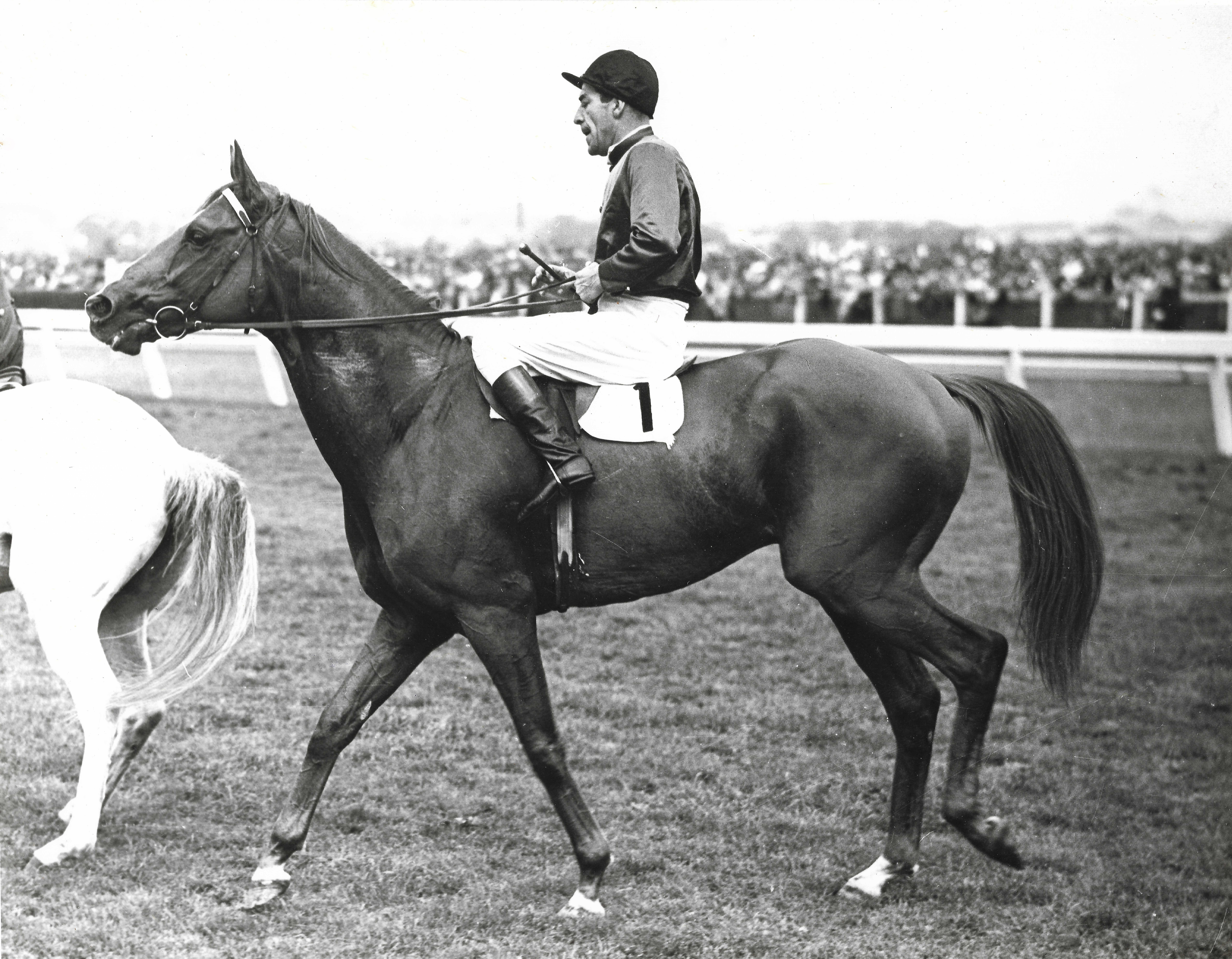
Russia and Darby Munro at Flemington.

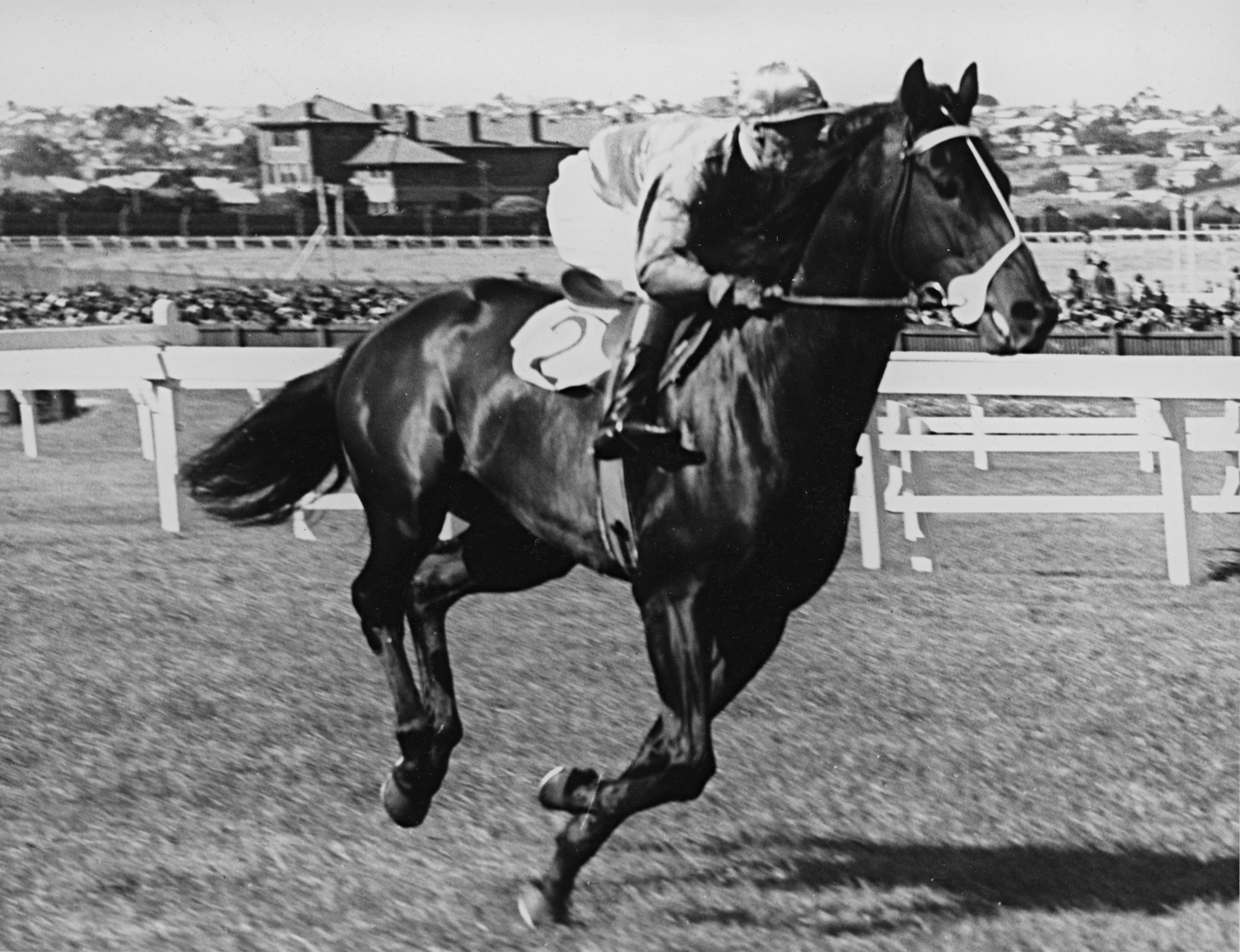
Beau Vite, 1941

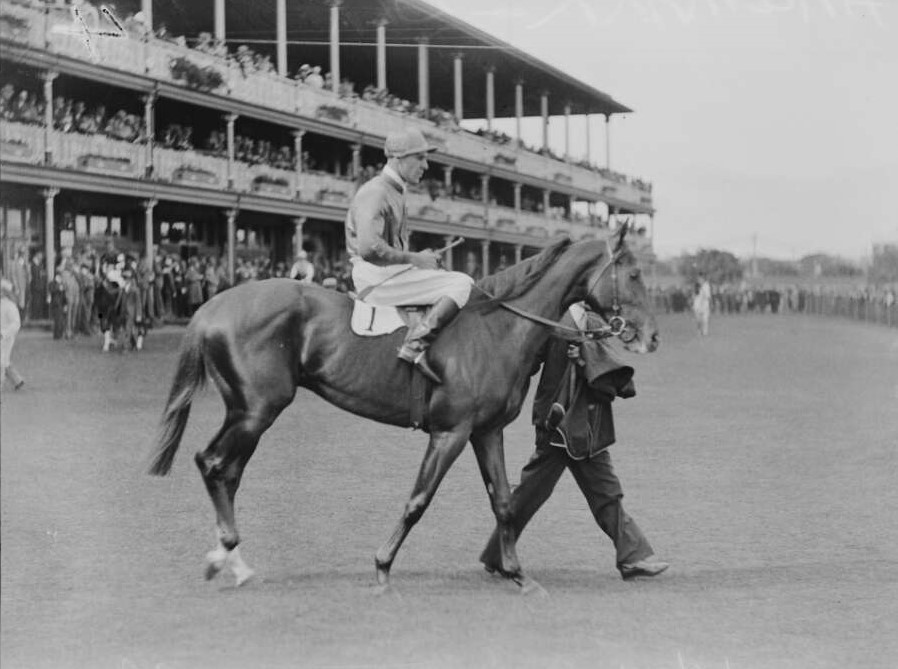
Hall Mark, 1934

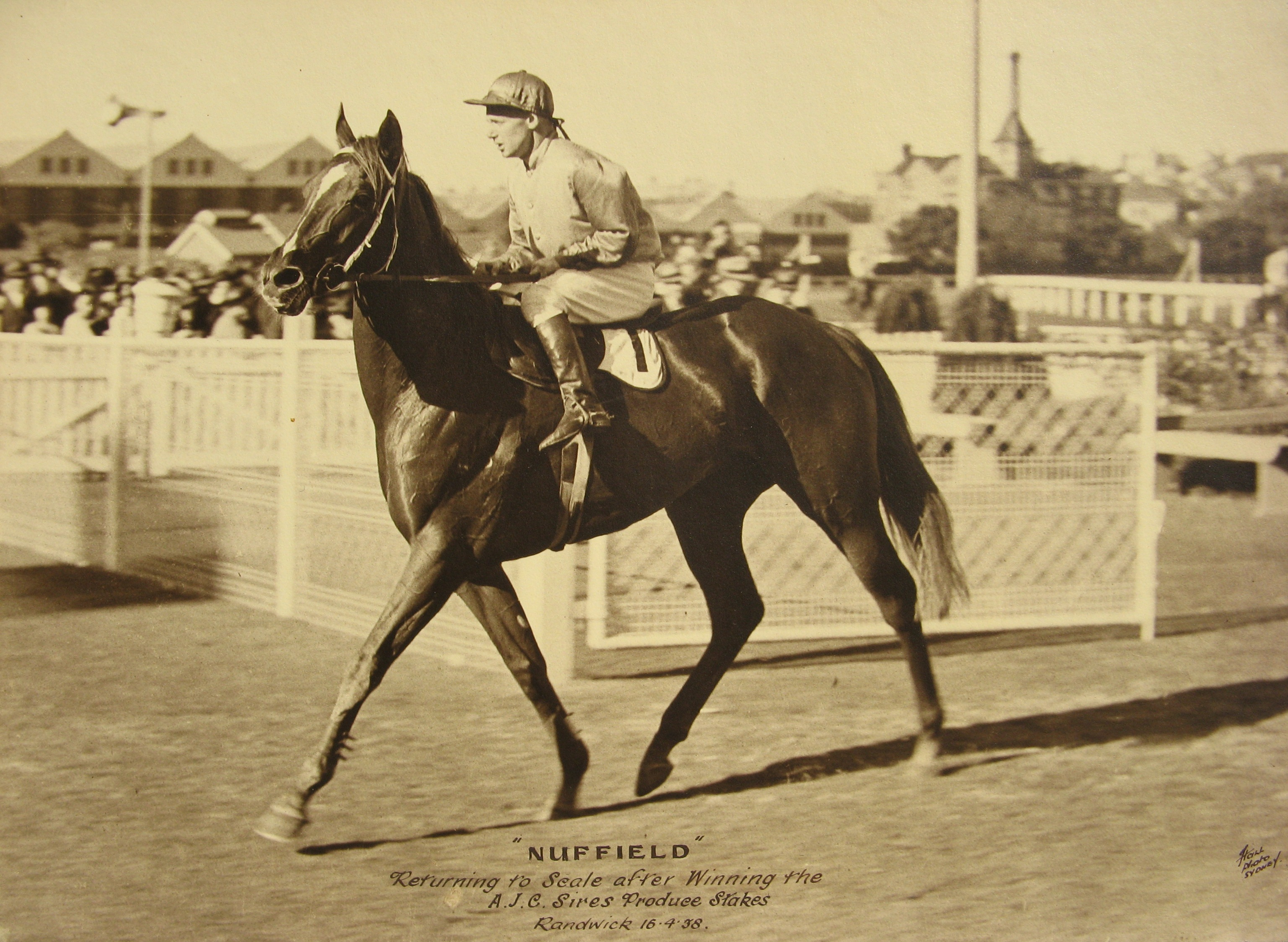
Nuffield, 1938

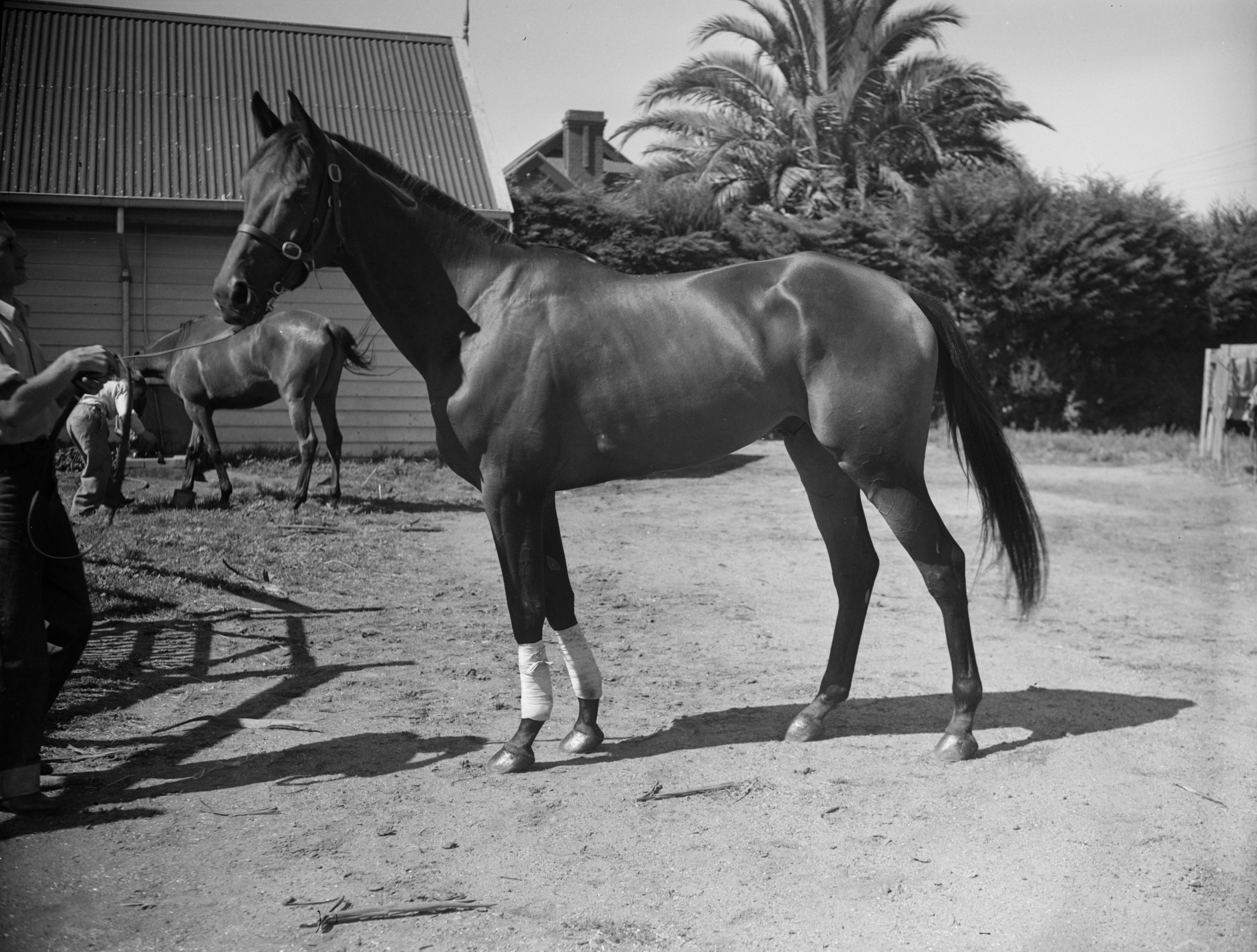
San Domenico, 1952

David Hugh "Darby" Munro (5 March 1913 – 3 April 1966), also known as "the Demon" or the "Brown Bomber", was an Aboriginal Australian jockey born in Caulfield. He was a three-time winner of the Melbourne Cup. He has been described as "arguably Australia’s greatest jockey".

== Early life ==
He was educated at Marist Brothers' College, Randwick, and served his apprenticeship as a jockey with his brother John. By another account, Munro was born on 23 March 1913 in Melbourne but grew up in Sydney, and was "discovered" by prominent Randwick trainer Jeremiah "Jerome" Carey (c. 1867 – 6 February 1952), and in 1925 or 1926 taken to Melbourne where he gained some experience riding Carey's horse Bicolor. This same article asserts that Darby got his jockey's ticket as his father's apprentice, but his first race was on Carey's Karuma in a Tattersall's Two-year-old Handicap on 21 May 1927, and was beaten by a horse named Rosso.

== Career ==
He trained with his father, Hugh Munro, from about age 10 and established himself as one of the best jockeys of the period. Munro came into prominence in May 1927 when he won the Prospect Handicap on Release, beating his famous brother Jim on Quixotic. Later that same day he won the May Handicap on Spring Days. His services were soon in demand by such famous trainers as Jackson "Jack" Holt "the Wizard of Mordialloc" (c. 1880–1951), Bailey Payten (c. 1896 – 9 September 1948), and Peter Riddle (c. 1885 – 29 June 1947).

== Style ==
Munro was noted for his vigorous riding, especially in a tight finish. Unlike many other outstanding jockeys, he was not interested in golf, but kept himself fit by riding and swimming, an exercise he enjoyed, and never dieted to keep his weight down, though he did have a problem later on. Though daring and energetic, he seldom fell from his mount, and was never seriously injured.

He was on several occasions invited to ride in England, but declined, preferring to remain in Australia. He was renowned for his stony poker face, which may have contributed to the ambivalent attitude of the public towards him: cheering his wins and booing his failures. His many fans may have considered him Australia's greatest jockey, but no-one would have denied he was the most colourful.

== Ancestry ==
Darby never publicly revealed his Aboriginal heritage. The details of his heritage are unclear. However, Munro is a prominent Aboriginal surname, and other Aboriginal riders were convinced he was Aboriginal. Due to his complexion he was referred to as the 'Brown Bomber'. He was also given the nickname "the Coon", a racist epithet which other Aboriginal sportspersons also were called.

== Later years ==
He appeared in cameo as himself in the 1941 comedy film Racing Luck.

In February 1941, his licence was revoked for six months after a race at Ascot. He enlisted with the Second AIF in 1942 and served until 1944 when he was discharged as medically unfit. A ride on Vagabond at Caulfield resulted in a two-year disqualification. His application for a permit to ride in England in 1953 was refused, but he made appearances in California and France that year.

== Retirement and death ==
He retired in 1955. In later years he suffered from diabetes and in 1964 his left leg had to be amputated. He died from cerebral haemorrhage, and his remains were buried in the Catholic section of Randwick cemetery.

== Legacy ==
- In 1981 a caricature of Darby Munro by Tony Rafty was featured on an Australian stamp issued by Australia Post.
- His name was in 2001 entered in the Australian Racing Hall of Fame.

== Notable wins ==
- Adrian Knox Stakes: Session (1941)
- All Aged Stakes: Katanga (1944); San Domenico (1952)
- Anniversary Handicap: Feminist (1941)
- Biraganbil Handicap: Katanga (1940)
- A.J.C. Challenge Stakes: Venetian Lady (1930)
- Chelmsford Stakes: Rogilla (1933) and (1934), beating Peter Pan, ridden by Jim Munro.
- Chipping Norton Stakes: Reading (1940); Katanga (1944) and (1945)
- Colin Stephen Quality Handicap previously Spring Stakes: Rogilla (1933) and (1934); Beau Vite (1941); Katanga (1942) and (1943)
- A.J.C. Derby/Australian Derby: Hall Mark (1933); Allunga (dead heat 1935); Nuffield (1938); Reading (1939); and Main Topic (1942)
- V.R.C. Derby/Victoria Derby: Hall Mark (1933); Hydrogen (1951)
- Doncaster Handicap: Venetian Lady (1930), his first important win; Mildura (1940)
- Duke of Gloucester Cup: Peter Pan
- Easter Plate: Session (1940)
- Epsom Handicap: Modulation (1944); and Shannon (1946), carrying 9 st. 9 lb. (61 kg)
- January Handicap: Feminist (1941)
- George Main Stakes: Shannon (1946) and (1947)
- Kings Cup (later known as Queen Elizabeth Stakes (ATC)): Rogilla (1934); Allunga (1937); Old Rowley (1938); Mosaic (1940); Katanga (1944); Russia (1947); Aristocrat (1952)
- Melbourne Cup: Peter Pan (1934); Sirius (1944); Russia (1946). The only riders with a better Melbourne Cup record were Bobby Lewis and Harry White, with four wins each.
- Melbourne Stakes (from 1937 known as LKS Mackinnon Stakes): Rogilla (1933); Peter Pan (1934); Beau Vite (1941)
- Paddington Handicap: Tuckerbox (1941)
- Phillip Handicap: Rylstone (1941)
- AJC St Leger: Reading (1940); Hydrogen (1952)
- AJC Sires' Produce Stakes: Dark Sky (1934); Reading (1939)
- Sydney Cup: Mosaic (1940); Abspear (1943); Veiled Threat (1944)
- Valicare Handicap: Astrid (1941)
- Victoria Derby: Hall Mark (1933); Nuffield (1938); Reading (1939); Beau Gem (1947); Hydrogen (1951)
- VRC St Leger: Reading (1940)
- Warwick Stakes: Rogilla (1935); Allunga (1937); Beaulivre (1940); Katanga (1943); Removal (1945) and Tarien (1954)
- Widden Handicap: Beau Port (1941)
- W S Cox Plate: Rogilla (1933); Young Idea (1937); Mosaic (1939); Beau Vite (1941); Hydrogen (1952)

Other notable mounts were Mosaic, Nuffield, Pantheon, Manrico, Mildura
