= Russia (horse) =

Australian Thoroughbred racehorse

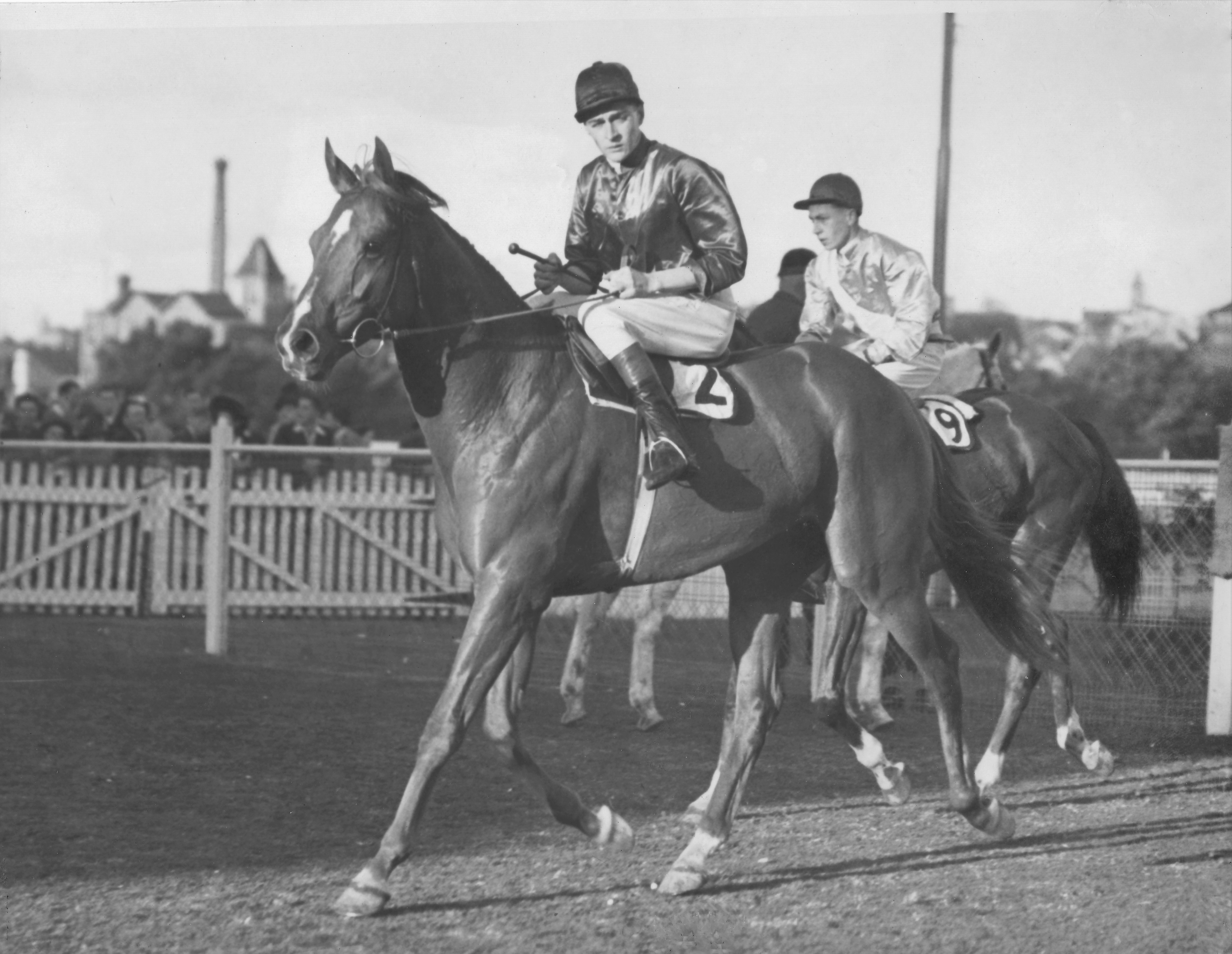
- Russia and Jack Thompson
- Sire: Excitement (IRE)
- Grandsire: Hurry On
- Dam: Lady March
- Damsire: Bonnement (GB)
- Sex: Stallion
- Foaled: 1940
- Country: Australia
- Colour: Chestnut
- Breeder: J. G. Leeds
- Owner: J. G. Leeds; Ted Hush; David J.Davis
- Trainer: Ted Hush; Frank McGrath Jnr
- Record: 89 starts: 22½-14-13
- Earnings: £39,273

Major wins
- Newcastle Gold Cup (1944); Colin Stephen Stakes (1945, 1947); Melbourne Cup (1946); Craven Plate (1947); Randwick Plate (1947); P J O'Shea Stakes (1947); AJC Plate (1947, 1948); AJC Cumberland Stakes (1948)
- Last updated on 10 September 2010

Russia was a hardy Australian bred Thoroughbred racehorse who won the 1946 Melbourne Cup and other staying races.

== Breeding ==
He was a chestnut stallion foaled in 1940 by the unplaced, but good sire, Excitement (IRE) from the unraced Lady March by the useful broodmare sire, Bonnement (GB). Lady March also had two sets of twins that died and Brazen March, a filly that did not race. Russia was bred at Trangie, New South Wales by J. G. Leeds and trained throughout his career by Ted Hush. During Russia's racing career Leeds gave Ted Hush a half share in Russia prior to his Melbourne Cup win.

== Racing record ==
A hardy competitor he competed for seven seasons over distances from 5 furlongs (1,000 metres) to 2¼ miles, starting 89 times for 22½ wins, which included victories in 19 principal races. Racing under weight for age (w.f.a.) conditions he won 12½ races and defeated Shannon and Flight when they were at the peak of their racing careers.

His biggest win was the 1946 VRC Melbourne Cup which he won by five lengths in a time of 3 minutes 21.25 seconds that equalled the then race record set by Wotan ten years earlier.

Russia won a further 10 races following his Melbourne Cup win. He won £39,273 during his racing career.

=== 1945 and 1946 racebooks ===
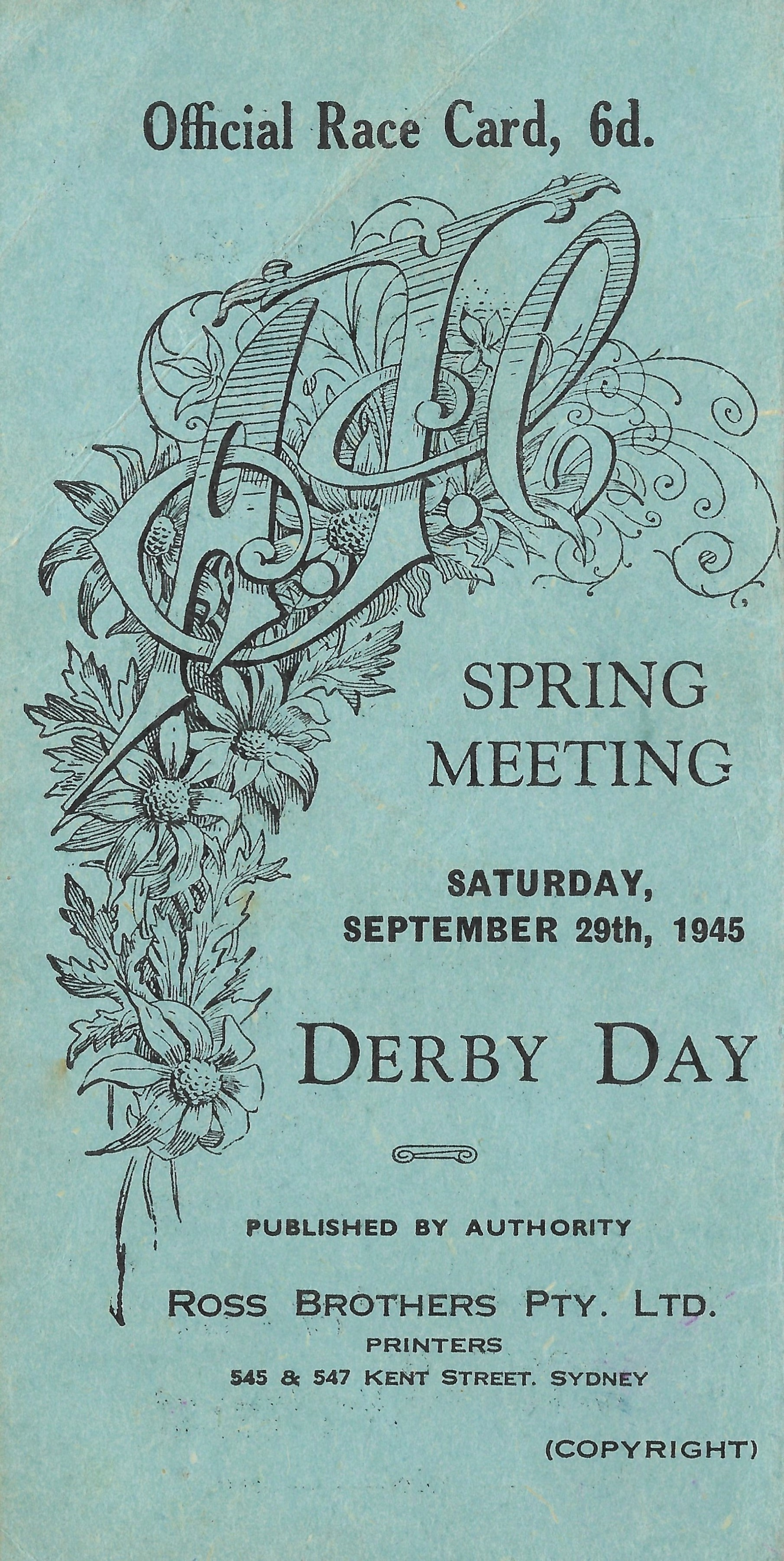
1945 AJC Colin Stephen Stakes racebook front cover

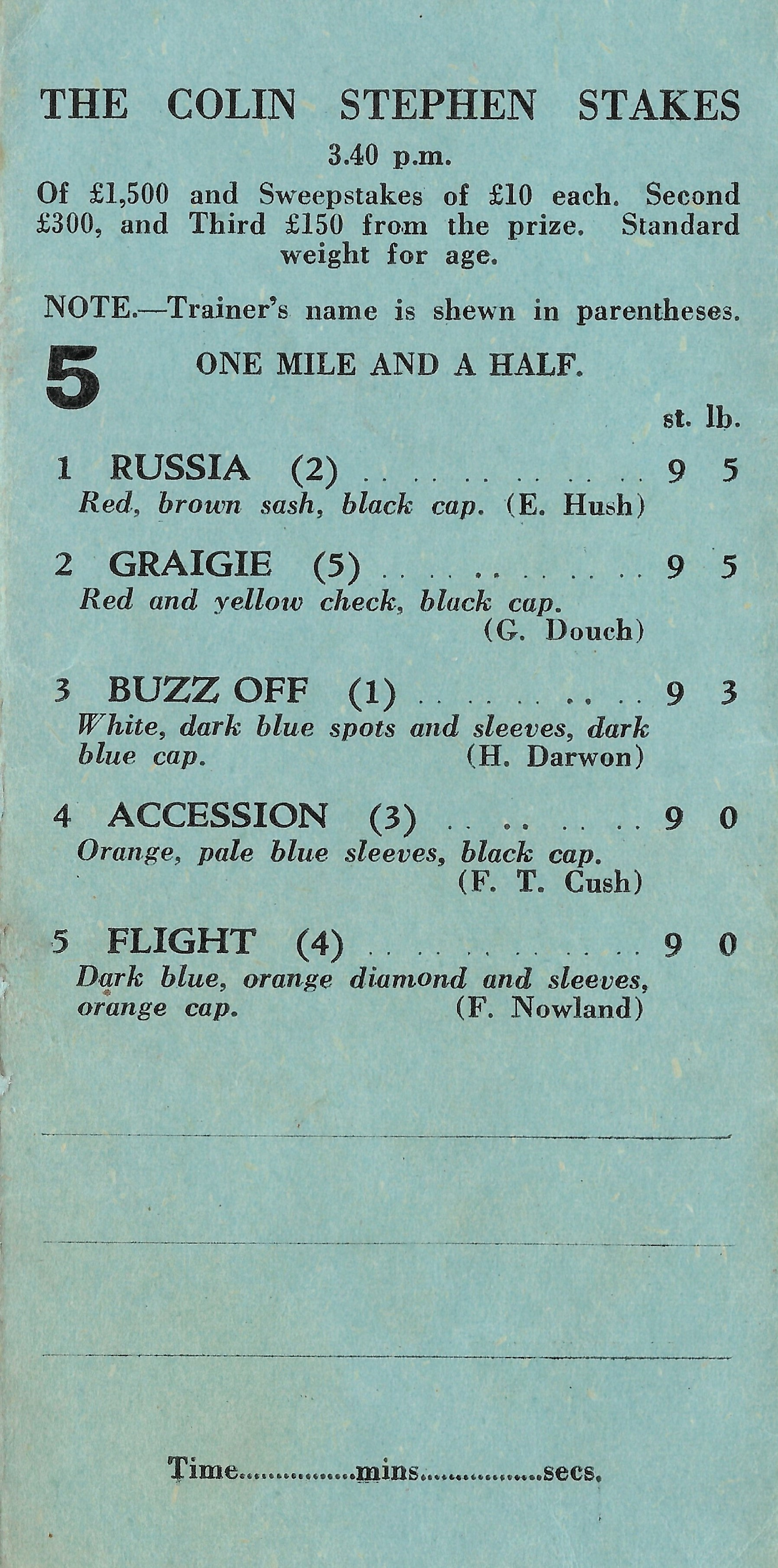
1945 AJC Colin Stephen Stakes page showing the winner, Russia

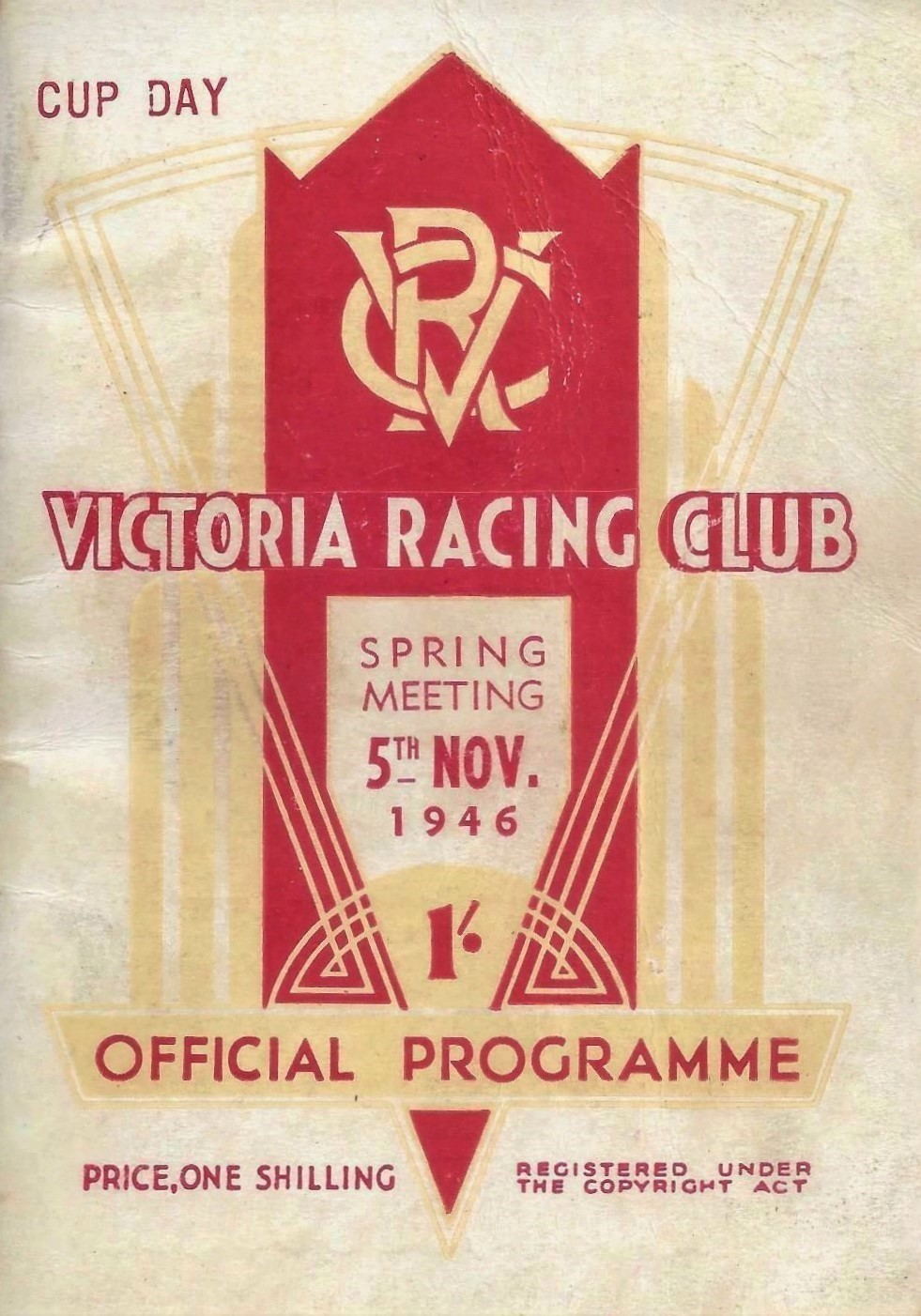
1946 VRC Melbourne Cup racebook front cover

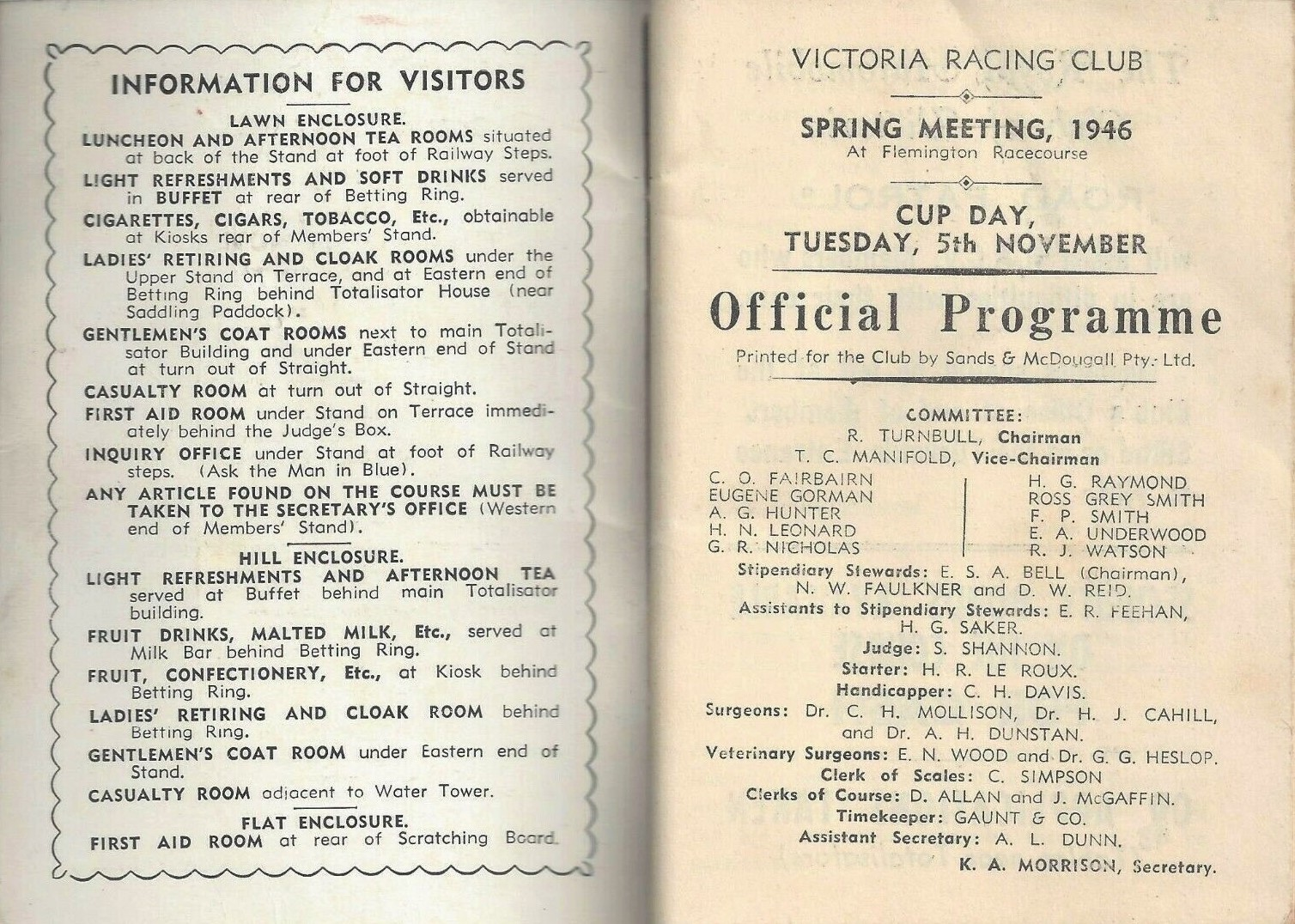
1946 VRC Melbourne Cup showing raceday officials

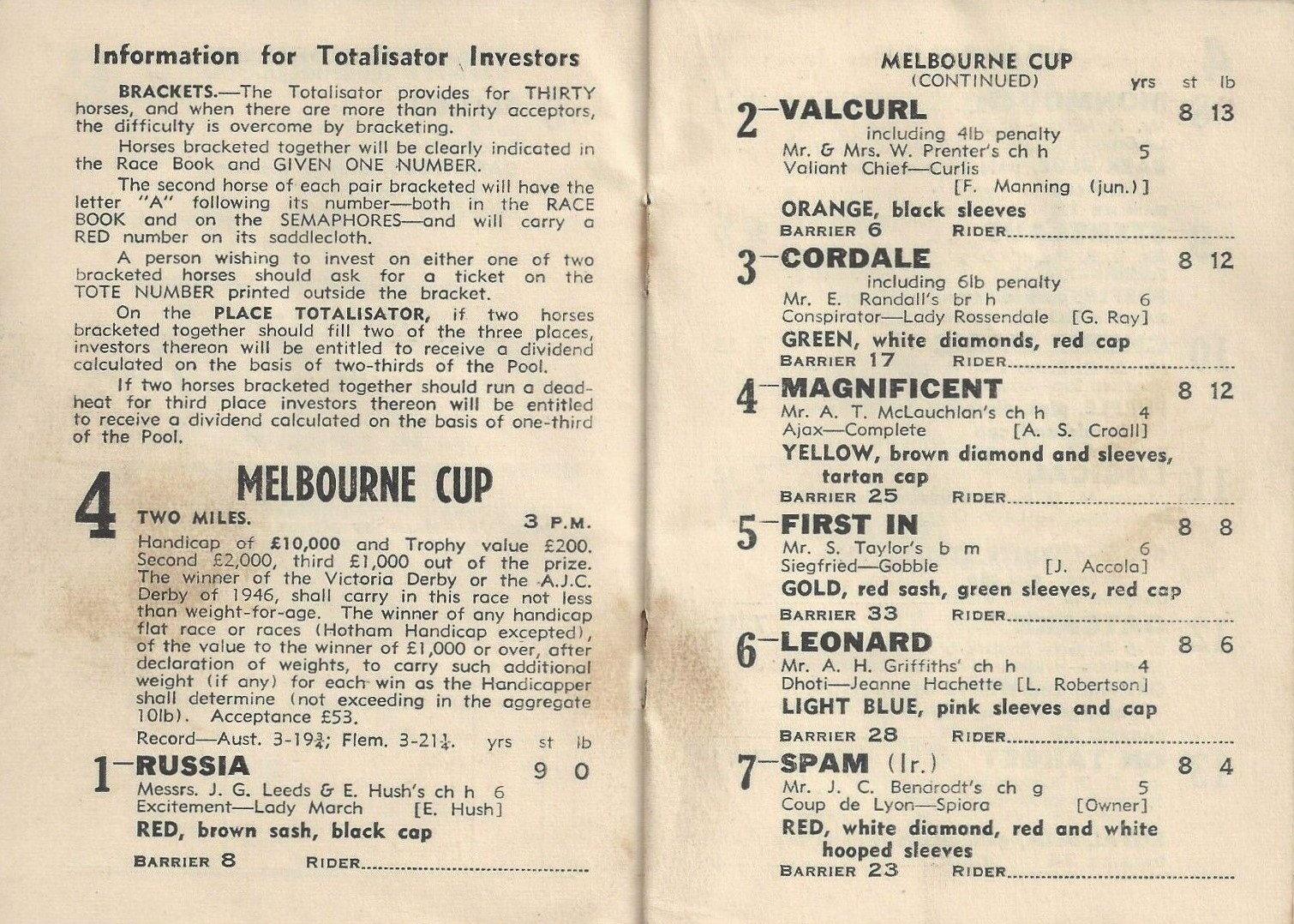
1946 VRC Melbourne Cup page showing the winner, Russia

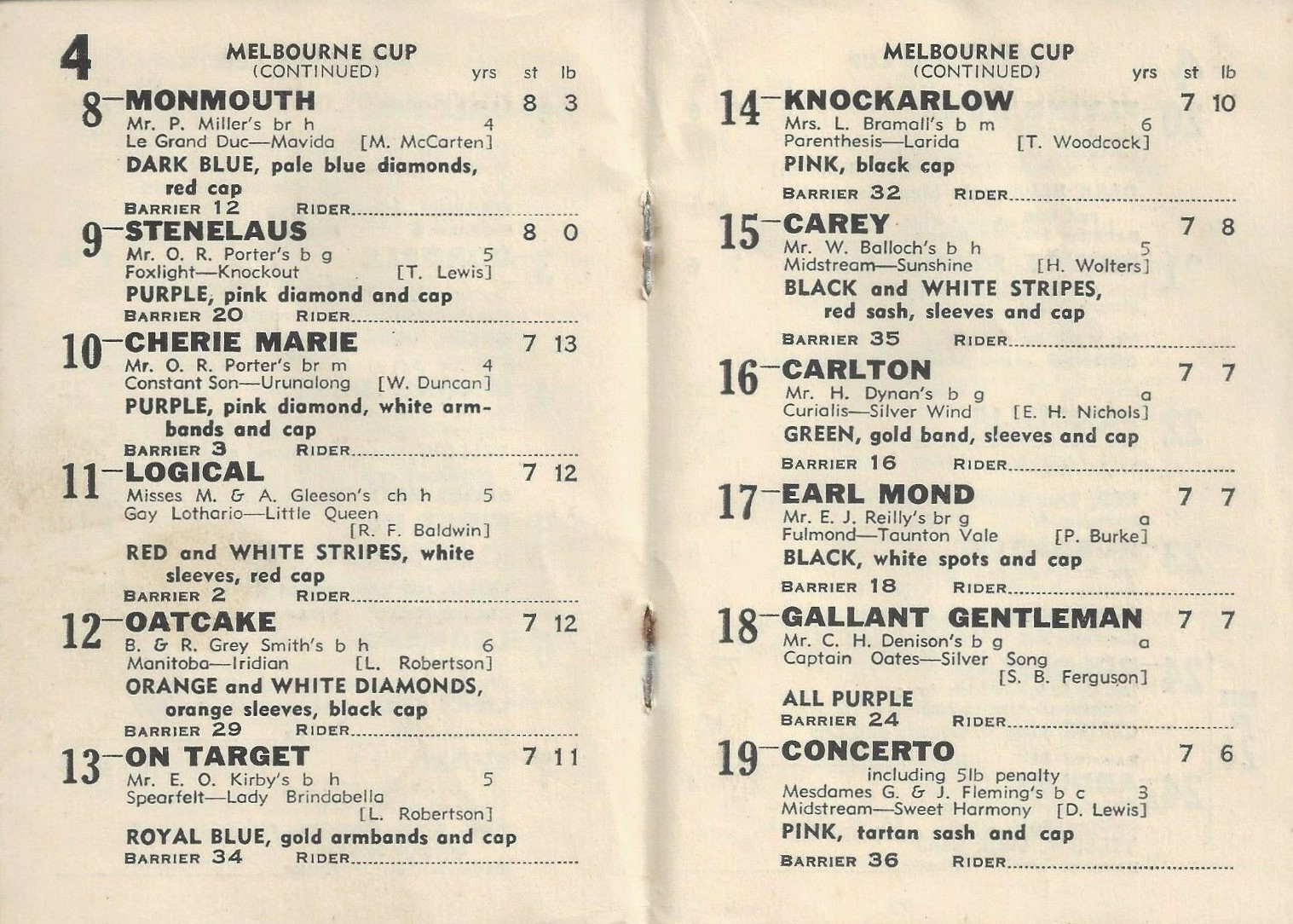
1946 VRC Melbourne Cup starters and results

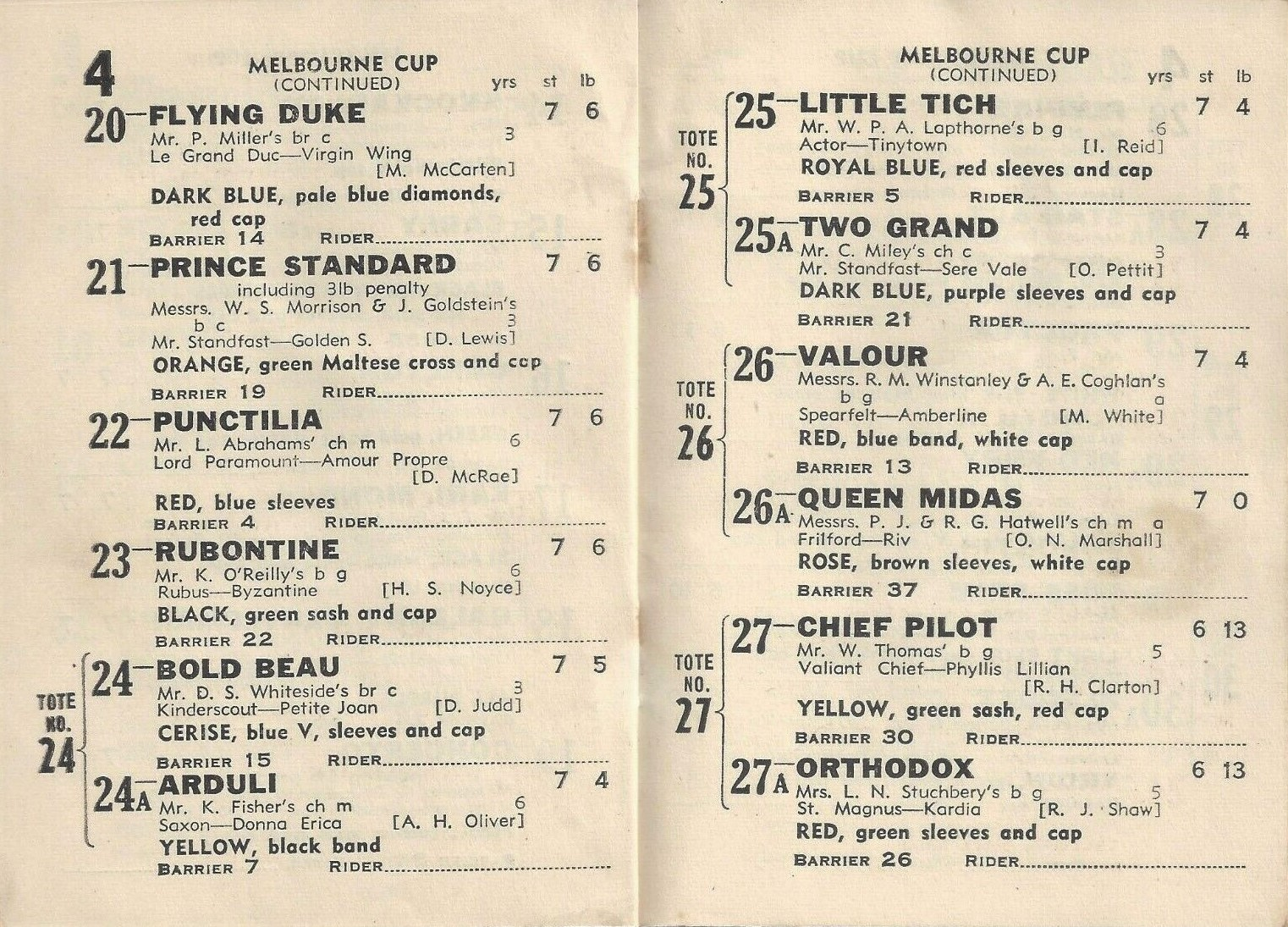
1946 VRC Melbourne Cup starters and results

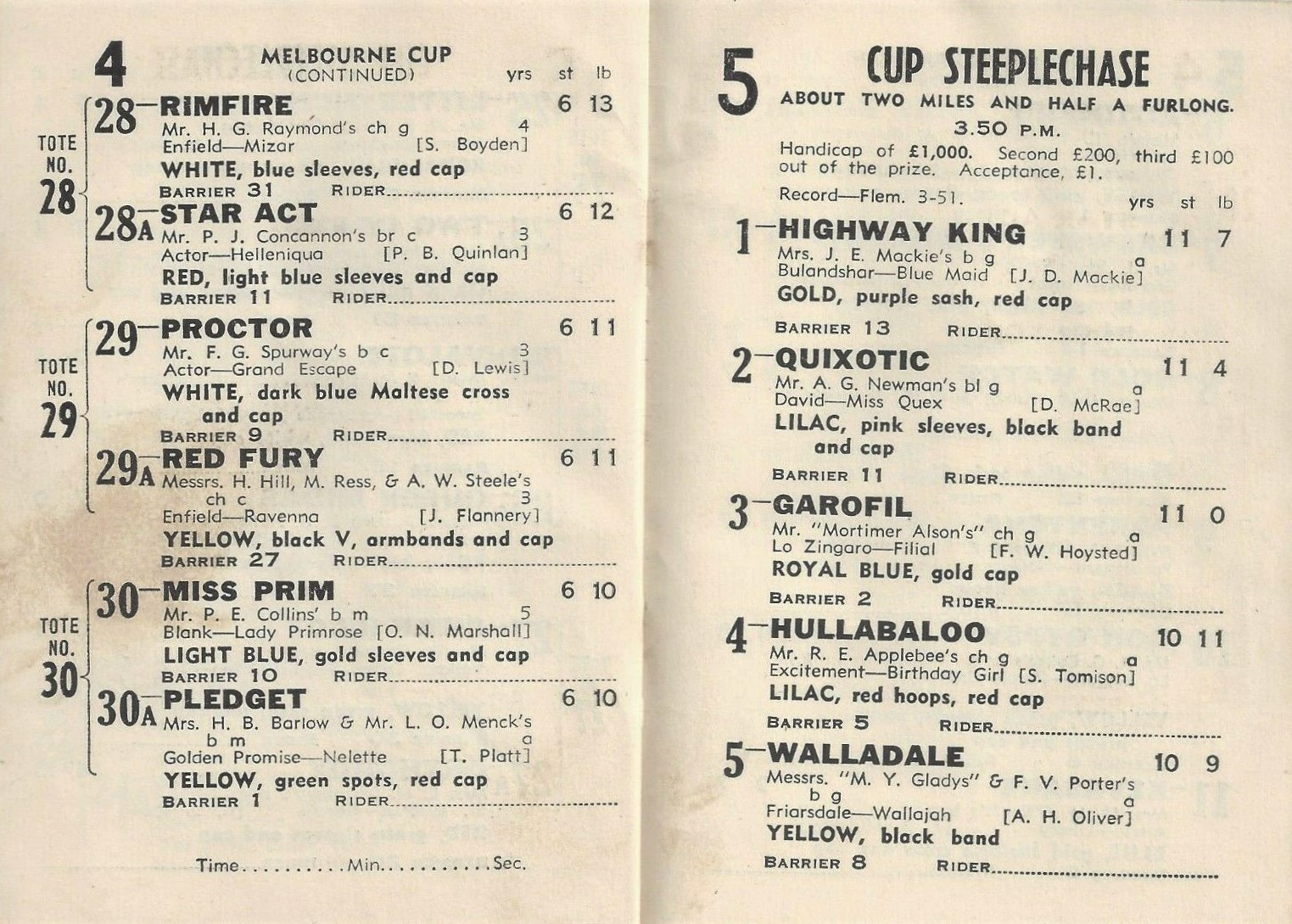
1946 VRC Melbourne Cup starters and results

== Image gallery ==
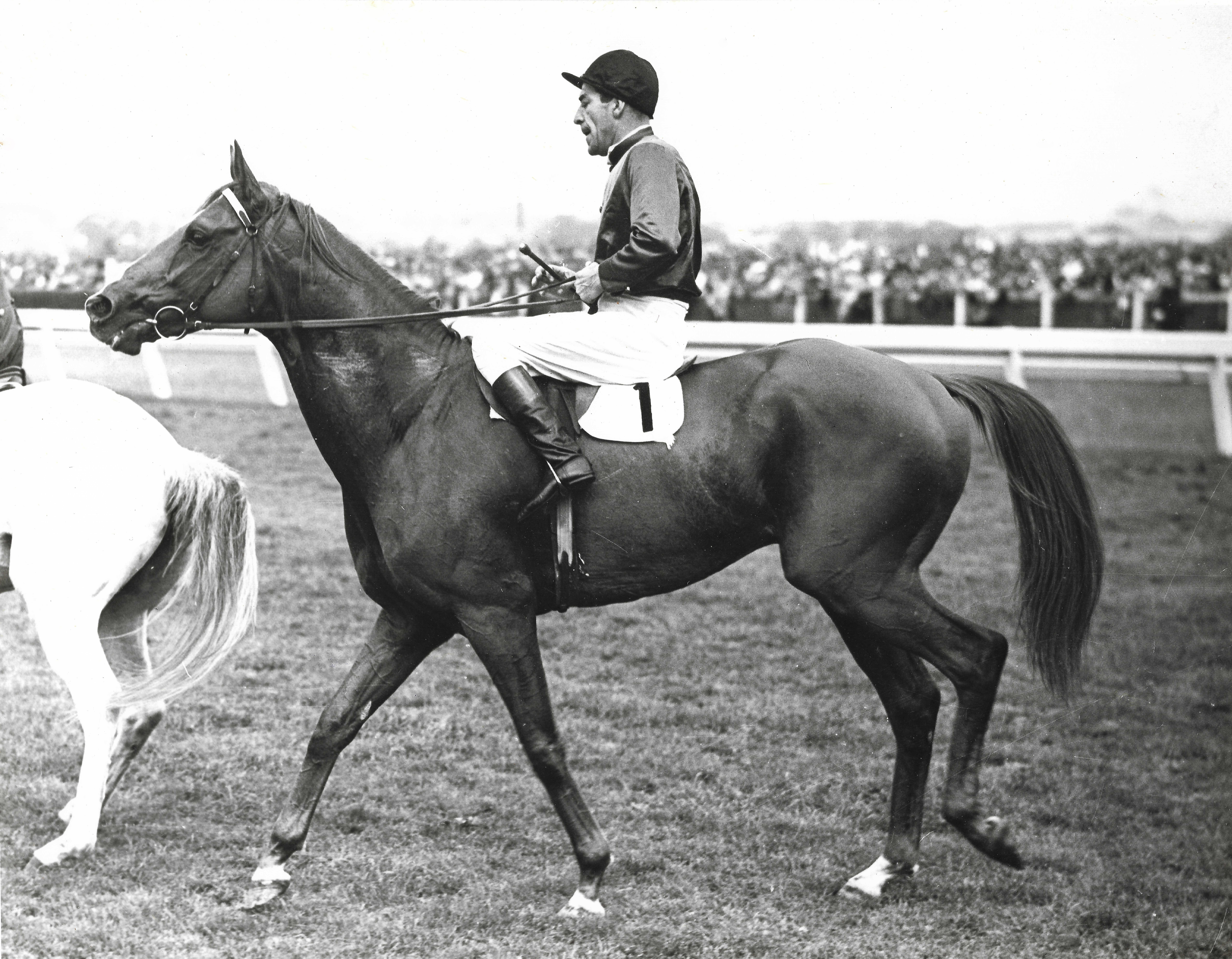
Russia and Darby Munro

Russia and Darby Munro 1946 VRC Melbourne Cup return to scale

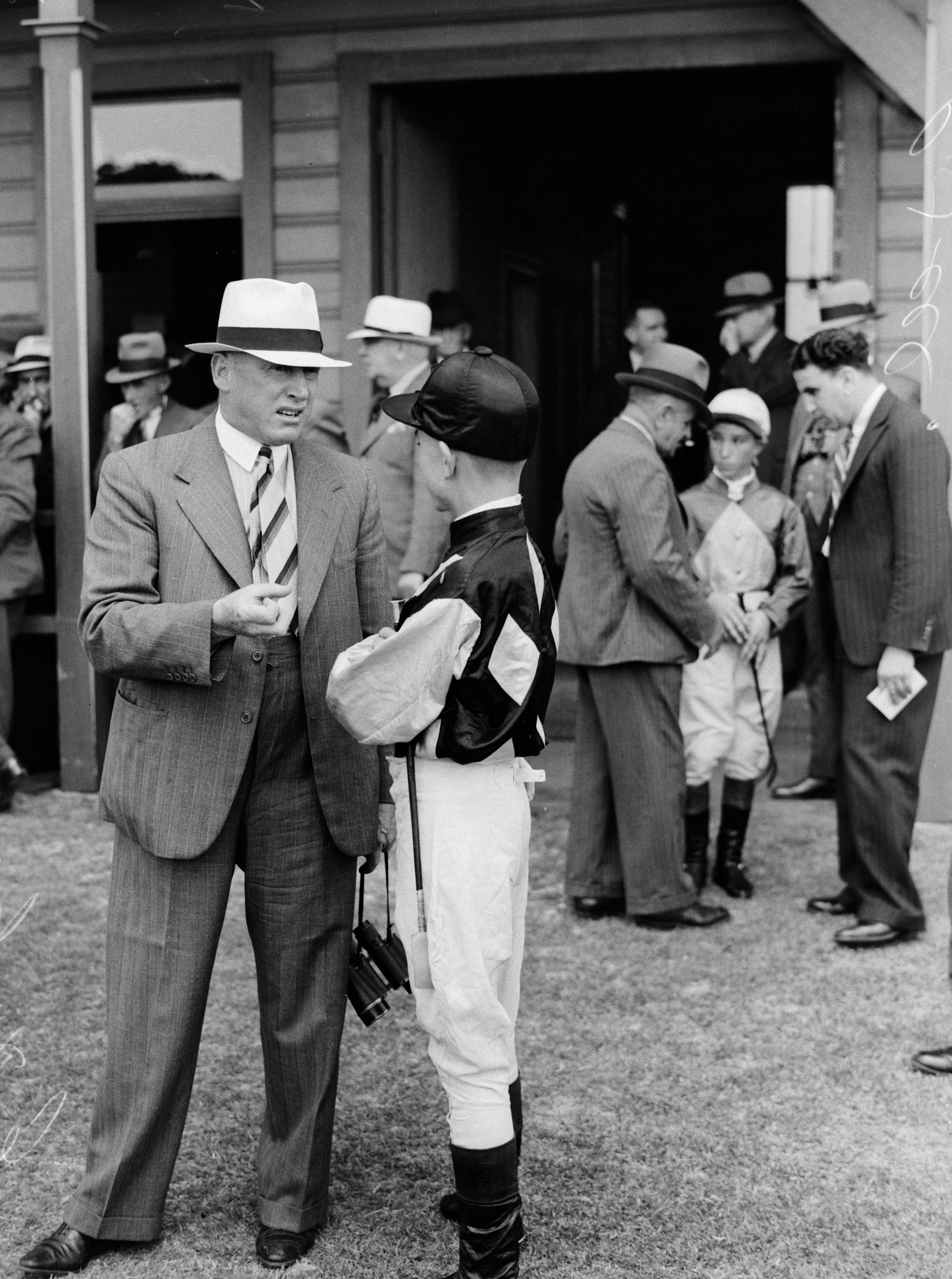
Ted Hush trainer at Kensington Racecourse

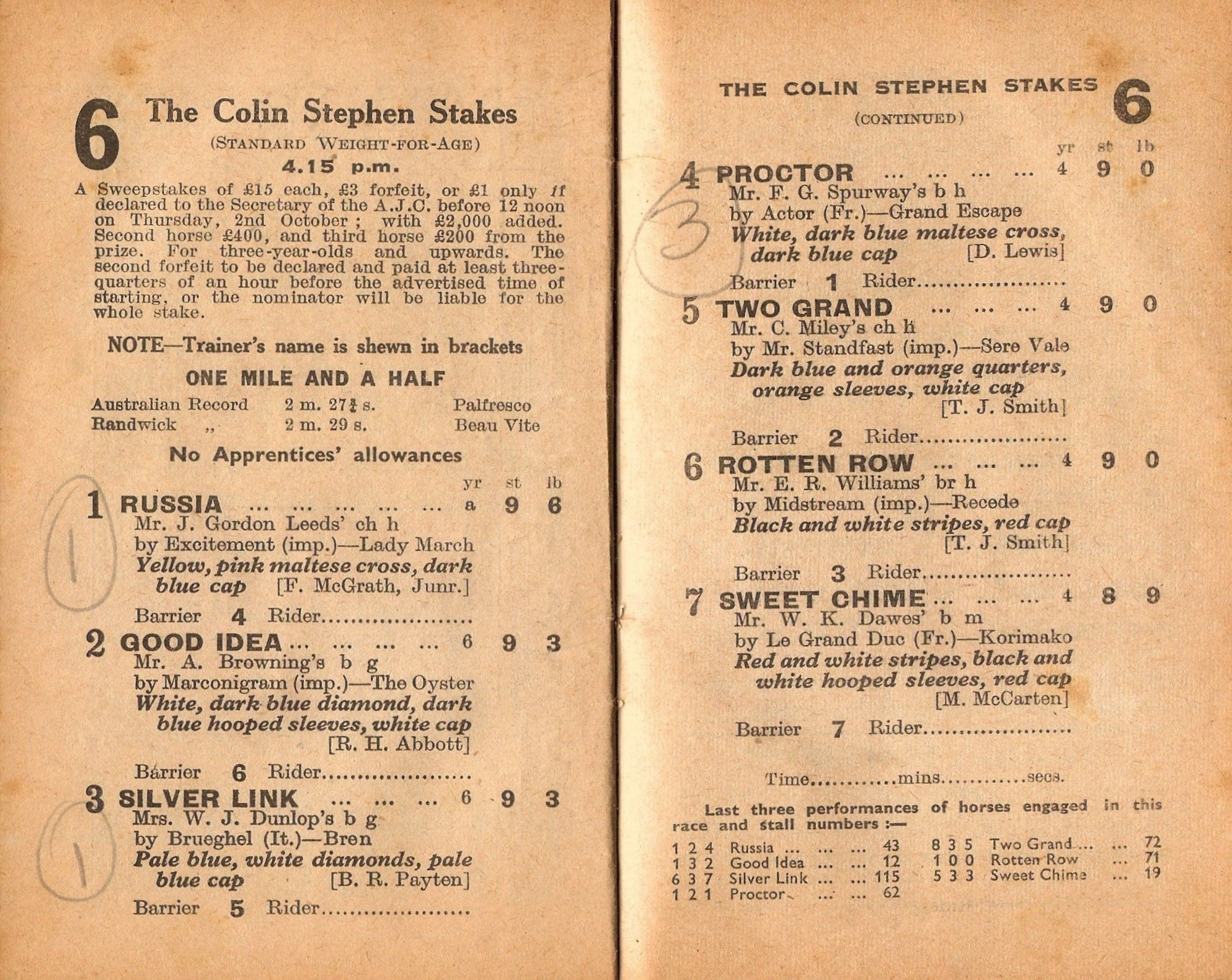
1947 AJC Colin Stephen Stakes racebook page showing the winner, Russia

== Stud record ==
Russia stood at stud in 1948 before he returned to racing in the autumn of 1949 for a short period. He was then sold to David J. Davis of Phar Lap fame, and lived in America after the conclusion of his racing career. Russia did not sire any principal race winners in Australia but did produce three stakes winners in the US, Carolas ($42,610), Georgie ($21,505) and Noredski ($72,410).
