= Hugh Munro (horse trainer) =

Hugh Munro was a racehorse trainer in Victoria, closely associated with the St Albans Stud of Geelong. He was the father of noted Sydney jockeys Jimmie Munro and Darby Munro.

== History ==
Hugh "Hughie" Munro (1861 – 2 June 1925) was trainer for W. R. Wilson at the Whittington, Victoria, St Albans Stud, managed by C. Leslie Macdonald. Hugh trained Revenue, winner of the 1901 Melbourne Cup; he also had Wakeful, a champion mare who ran second in 1903, and seven other placegetters in the Melbourne Cup. Munro had ambitions for his two younger sons, Jim and Darby, to land the big event. He would see Jim run second on Rivoli in 1923, but died before he made the great win on Windbag in 1925, and Statesman three years later. Hugh Munro always believed his youngest son Darby, who as a lad knew how to sit on a horse, would one day become one of Australia's most notable riders. Darby would win the Cup on Peter Pan in 1934.

The Munros moved to Randwick, Sydney, about 1916. Three sons were notable for their work in the racing industry:

=== Jack Munro ===
John Frederick "Jack" Munro ( – 1959 or earlier) was an A.R.C.-licensed trainer, based at Warwick Farm and racing stables at Liverpool. Among the racehorses he trained were: Contrast; Coinash; La Gloria; Allunga; 1935 *A.J.C. Derby/Australian Derby; Correct; Karingal. In May 1939 Munro and jockey H. Hughes were disqualified for 12 months after stewards considered Grand Hotel "had not been allowed to run on his merits". On appeal the ban was lifted.

He was in 1944 licensee of the Cootamundra Hotel in Cootamundra, later the New Zealand Hotel at the bottom of William Street, Sydney.

=== Jimmie Munro ===
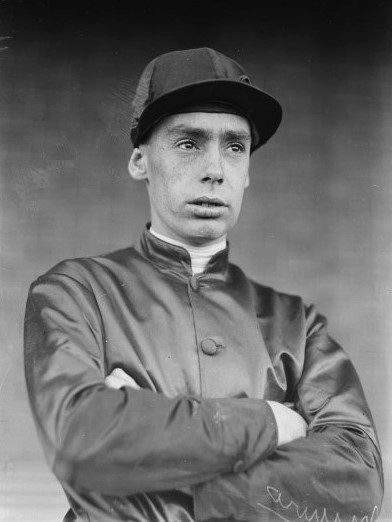
Jim Munro - ca.1925.

James Leslie "Jim" "Jimmie" Munro (7 September 1906 – 24 July 1974) was born in Caulfield, Victoria, and was recognised by Dick Wootton and William Kelso as a talented rider when quite young, and rode for his father, completing his apprenticeship as a jockey with E. F. Walker (c. 1884–1946), the Randwick, New South Wales, trainer. He had his first Melbourne Cup ride at age 15, then in 1923 he was second on Rivoli; in 1926 he won on Windbag and again in 1928 on Statesman. His first big win was the 1922 Sydney Cup on Prince Charles, owned by John Brown. He won many other major races in Melbourne and Sydney during the 1920s: on Valicare in the Doncaster, Boaster in the Epsom and Leslie Wallace in the Sires Produce Stakes. In 1927 he was disqualified for a year following his ride on the gelding Songift at Canterbury on 18 June, along with the horse, trainer S. B. Kelly and Parkes bookmaker J. Leech, by a majority decision of the committee following some irregular betting and the horse failing at the final stretch, though to what end was never made clear. This was not the first time he came to the attention of the stewards: in 1923 he had a month's suspension for interference in the Hawksburn Handicap. He was suspended again, in April 1929 for one month, following a complaint of interference by jockey H. Birmingham and subsequent altercation in the jockeys' room. These incidents had little effect on Munro's career: he rode Phar Lap in the Rosehill Guineas on 21 September 1929, one of the great gelding's earliest wins (his first was the Rosehill Maiden Juvenile Handicap, 27 April 1929). Notable wins include:

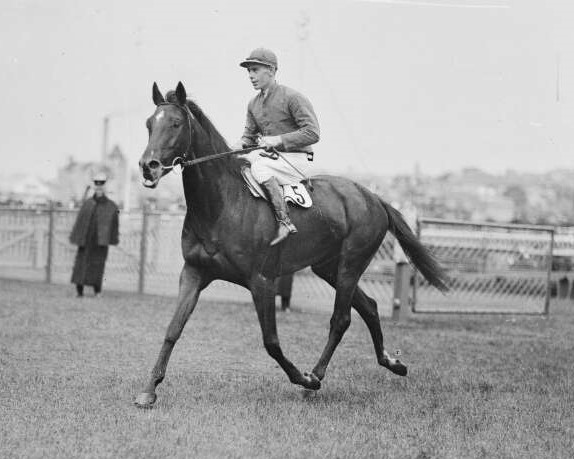
Valicare & Jim Munro Randwick 1926

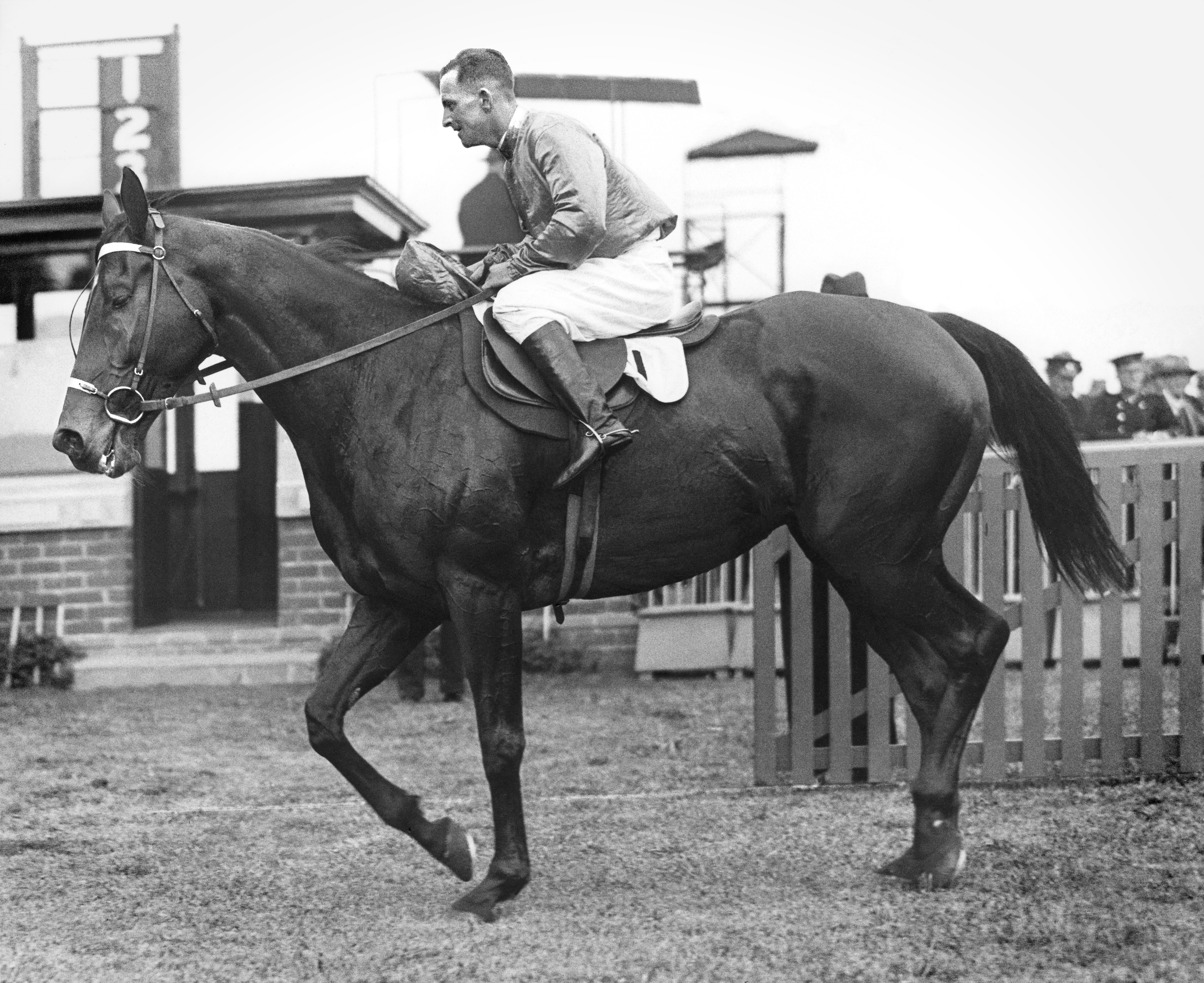
Amounis, at Caulfield

- All Aged Stakes: Valicare (1926); Sir Chrystopher (1931)
- A.J.C. Derby/Australian Derby: Prince Humphrey (1928)
- Cantala Stakes: Amounis (1929)
- Craven Plate: Windbag (1925) and (1926); Chatham (1932)
- Chelmsford Stakes Windbag (1925)
- Doncaster Handicap: Valicare (1926)
- Epsom Handicap: Boaster (dead heat, 1925); Amounis (1926) and (1928); Silver Ring (1934)
- Melbourne Cup: Windbag (1925); Statesman (1928)
- Melbourne Stakes (from 1937 known as LKS Mackinnon Stakes): Rivoli (1923)
- The Metropolitan: Loquacious (1929)
- Newmarket Handicap: Quintus (1924)
- Queen Elizabeth Stakes (ATC)):known as AJC Plate Windbag (1925) and (1926); Strephon (1929)
- Sydney Cup: Prince Charles (1922)
- AJC St Leger: Windbag (1925)
- Victoria Derby: Liberal (1932)
- Warwick Stakes: Windbag (1926)
- Williamstown Cup: Amounis (1928)
- W S Cox Plate: Chatham (1932)

In 1929 he was invited by Baron Oppenheim, (perhaps Friedrich Carl von Oppenheim, father of Alfred von Oppenheim) Germany's leading owner, to ride for him in Germany, which he accepted, and left the following January He won that year's German Derby at Hamburg on Alba.

He returned to Australia the following year, then in 1934 accepted an invitation to ride in India, although this meant forgoing a promised ride on Peter Pan in that year's Melbourne Cup. Trainer Frank McGrath chose his brother Darby as a suitable replacement, ensuring that rider's place in Cup history.

He returned to Australia, but having increasing difficulty in keeping his weight down, quit racing for training, and had some success with Tel Asur and Opulent the 1952 Sydney Cup. He spent some time in England with his daughter who had married G. Lewis, an English jockey.

Recognition

His name has been entered in the Australian Racing Hall of Fame.

=== Darby Munro ===
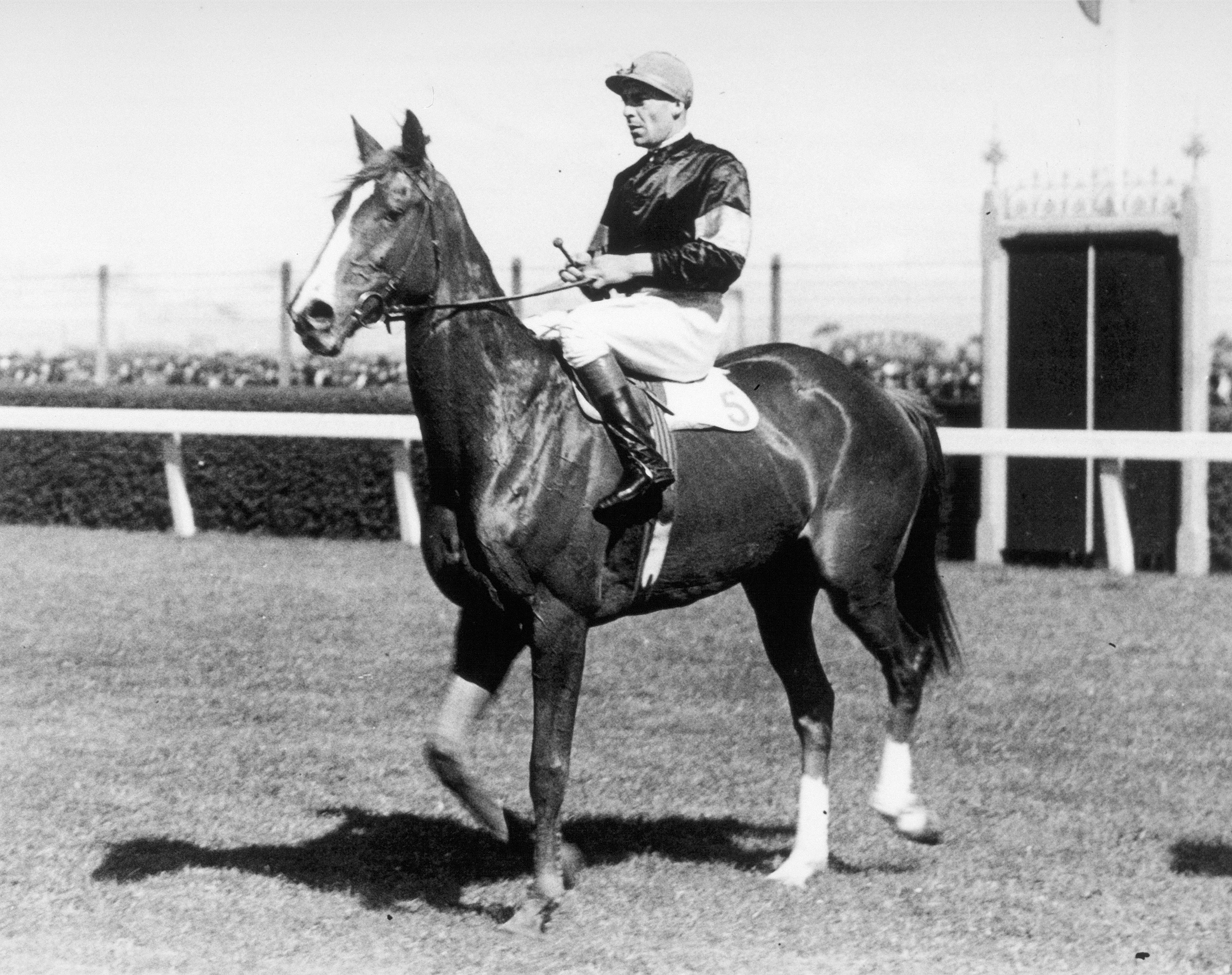
Rogilla, and Darby Munro at Flemington

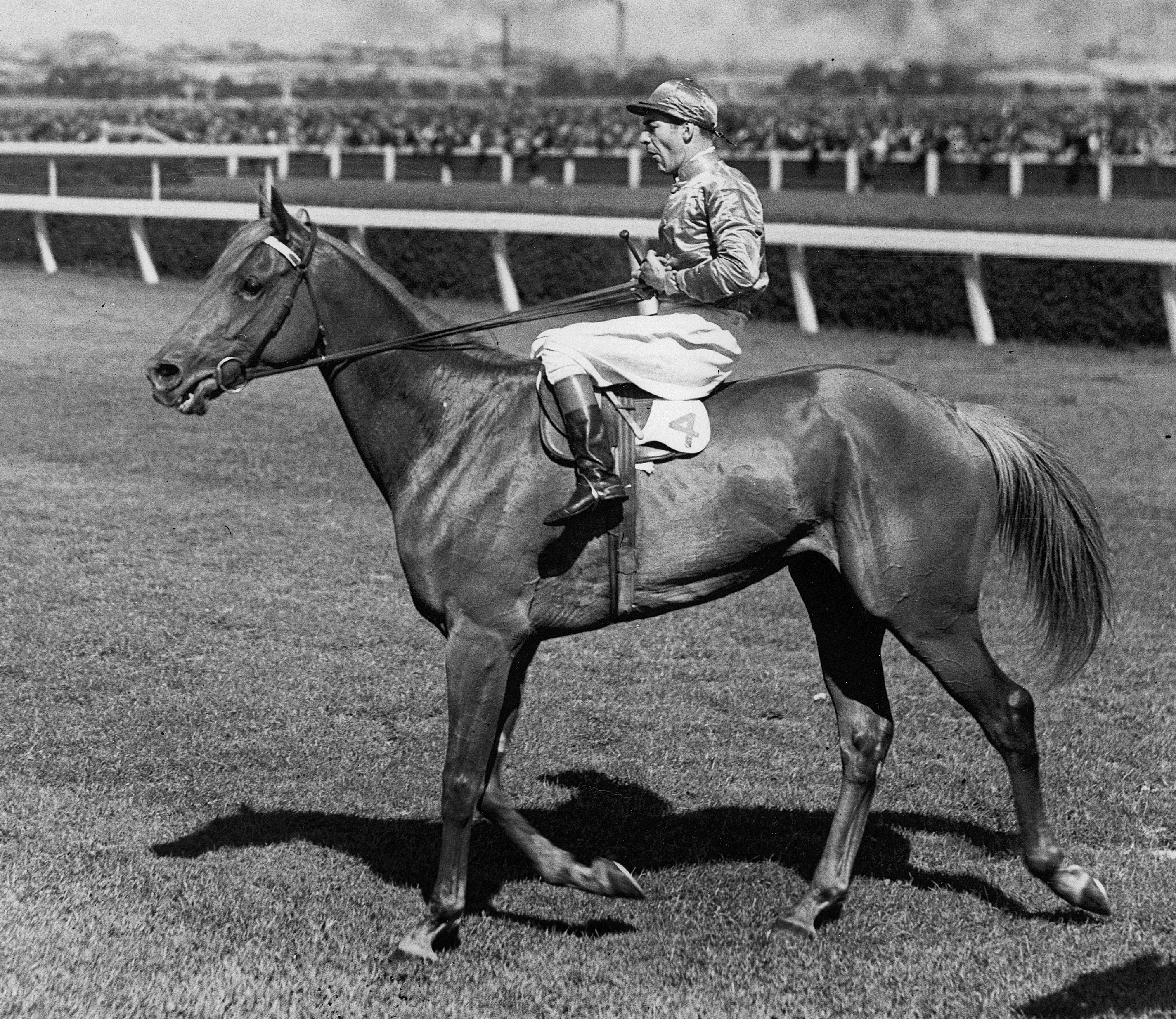
Peter Pan and Darby Munro, at Flemington

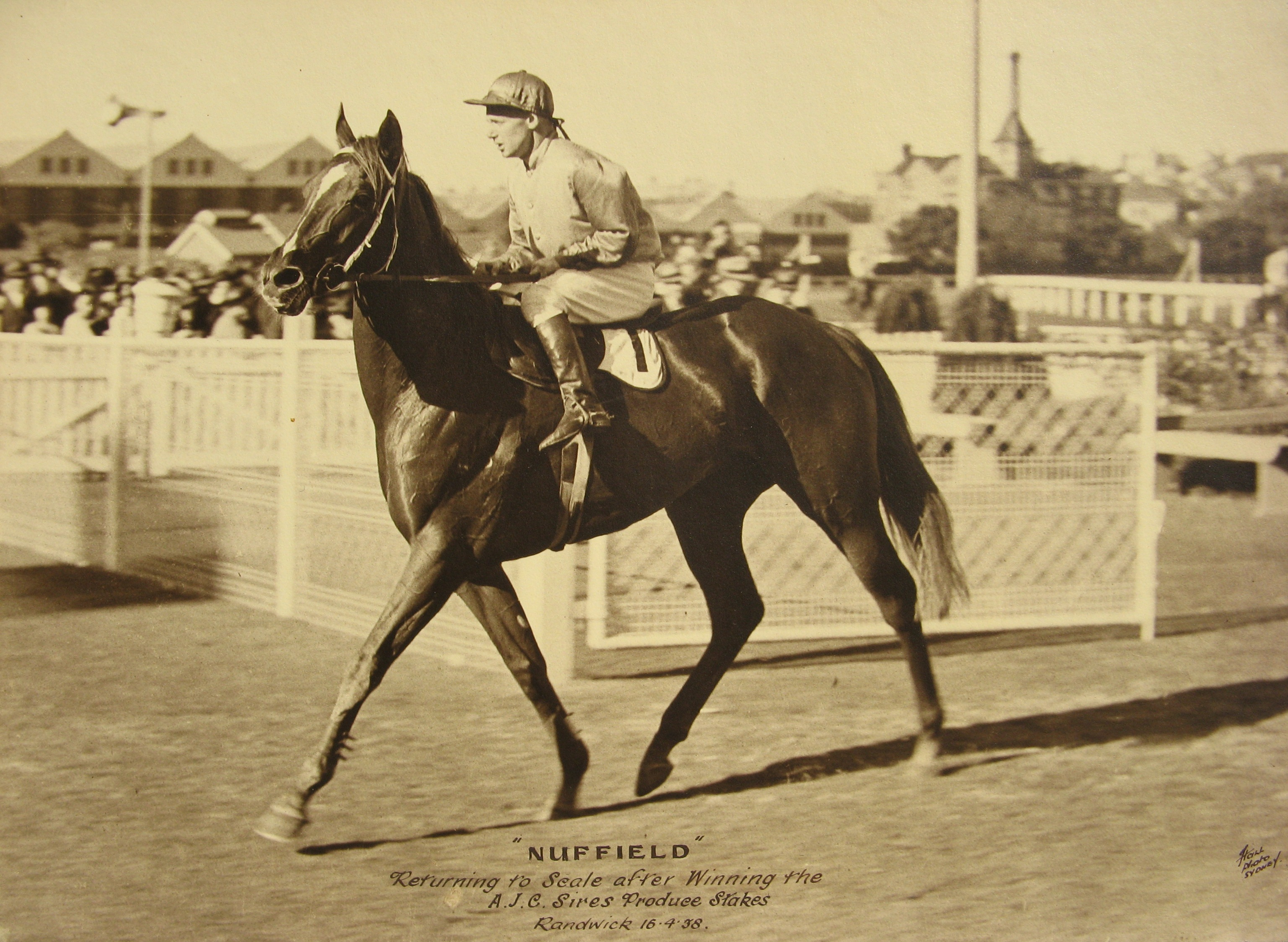
Nuffield at Randwick

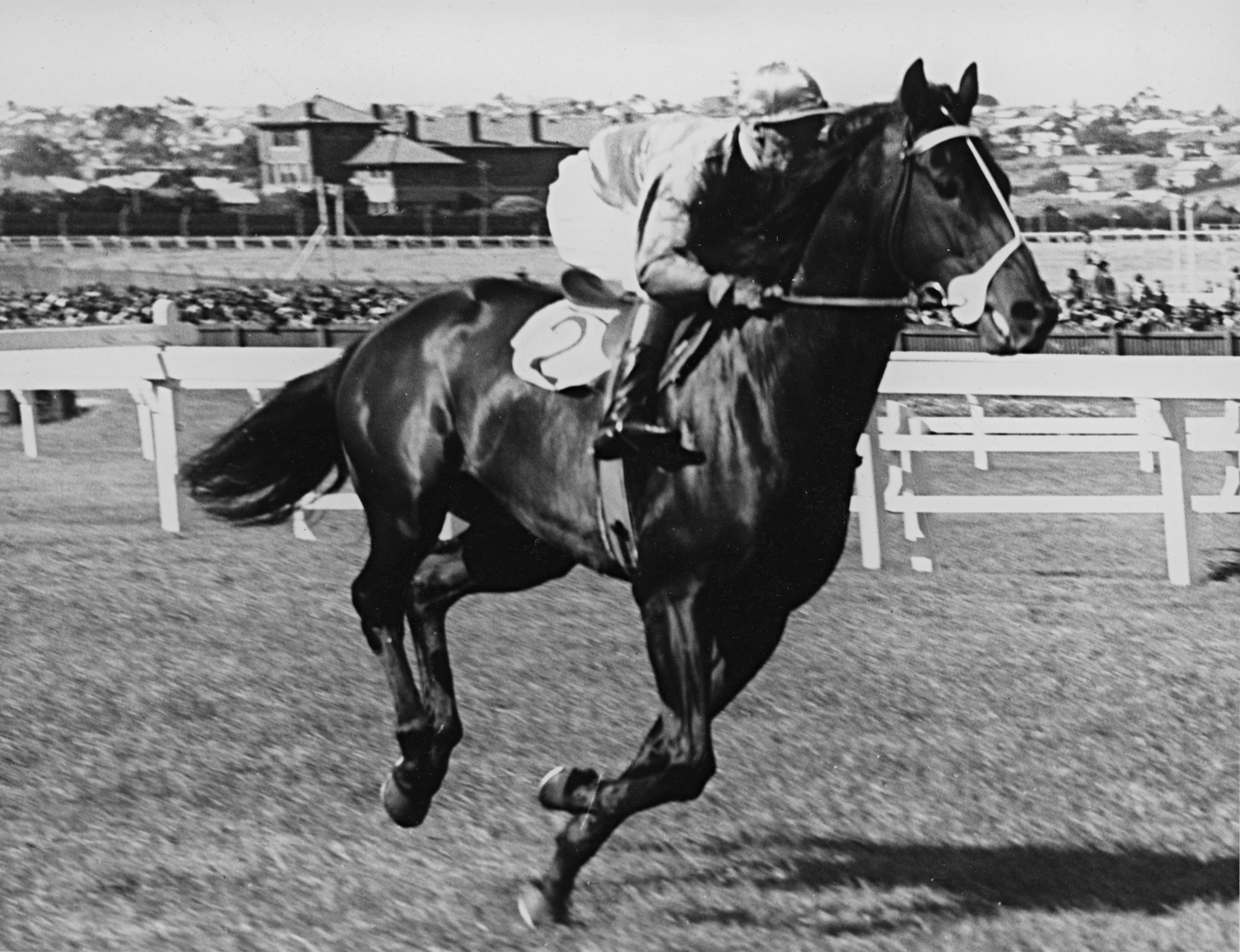
Beau Vite at Moonee Valley

David Hugh "Darby" "the Demon" "Brown Bomber" Munro (5 March 1913 – 3 April 1966) was also born in Caulfield. He was educated at Marist Brothers' College, Randwick, and served his apprenticeship as a jockey with his brother John. He trained with Hugh from age 10 and soon became one of the best jockies of his age. By another account, Munro was born on 23 March 1913 in Melbourne but grew up in Sydney, and was "discovered" by prominent Randwick trainer Jeremiah "Jerome" Carey (c. 1867 – 6 February 1952), and in 1925 or 1926 taken to Melbourne where he gained some experience riding Carey's horse Bicolor. This same article asserts that Darby got his jockey's ticket as his father's apprentice, but his first race was on Carey's Karuma in a Tattersall's Two-year-old Handicap on 21 May 1927, and was beaten by a horse named Rosso. Munro came into prominence in May 1927 when he won the Prospect Handicap on Release, beating his famous brother Jim on Quixotic. Later that same day he won the May Handicap on Spring Days. His services were soon in demand by such famous trainers as Jackson "Jack" Holt "the Wizard of Mordialloc" (c. 1880–1951), Bailey Payten (c. 1896 – 9 September 1948), and Peter Riddle (c. 1885 – 29 June 1947).

== Family ==
Hugh Munro (1861 – 2 June 1925) married Susanna Catherine Dunn (c. 1875 – 3 October 1943) sometime around 1900. They had a home at 8 Prince Street, Randwick. Their children included:

- Hugh Munro ( – before 1943) NOT Hugh Gordon Munro, polo player, who married Charmian Phyllis Mack on 8 October 1935
- Dorothy Millie Munro ( – ) married cyclist Alexander Bearpark ( – )
- John Frederick Munro ( – )
- James Leslie "Jimmie" Munro (7 September 1906 – 24 July 1974) married Florence Ita Mary Duncombe on 14 May 1932. They had one daughter, who married English jockey G. Lewis.
- Jean Munro ( – ) married M. Rose ( – )

- Gloria Munro (c. 1930– )
- Jean Munro (C. 1931– )

- Phillis Munro (c. 1911 – 25 July 1936)
- David Hugh "Darby" Munro (5? 23? March 1913 – 3 April 1966) married cabaret artiste Iris Veronica Fisher on 14 May 1934. They divorced in 1937, to a great deal of publicity. He married again, to Elsie Joyce Dixon on 28 August 1941. They had two children then divorced. He married one more time, to Kathleen Augusta Waverley "Dubby" Trautwein (14 October 1906 – 11 July 1996) on 24 June 1958.
