= Ward (surname) =

Some specific coats of arms used by people of the surname Ward- not generally applicable to the surname as is commonly misunderstood: The Viscounts Bangor descending from Bernard Ward, 1st Viscount Bangor bear the arms azure, a cross flory or. A William Ward, of Sudbury, MA, U.S.A., was in 1639 granted arms blazoned Azure, a cross patoncé or.

Ward is a surname of either Old English or Old Gaelic origin, common in English-speaking countries.

The Old English name derives from an occupational surname for a civil guard/keeper of the watch, or alternately as a topographical surname from the word werd ("marsh"). The Old Irish surname is linguistically unrelated, and derives from Mac an Bháird ("son of the Bard"), a bárd being a storyteller or poet. An Irish variant is O'Ward. The oldest public record of the surname dates to 1176.

In the 2010 United States census, Ward was the 79th most common surname. It is the 78th most common surname in Ireland. It was the 31st most common surname in the 1991 UK census and 40th in 2001 census, and in 2007, was found to be the most common surname in Lutterworth, Leicestershire.

== Surname ==
=== A ===
- Aaron Ward (disambiguation), multiple people
- Adam Ward (disambiguation), multiple people
- Sir Adolphus Ward (1837–1924), English historian
- Adrian Ward (disambiguation), multiple people
- Agnes S. Ward (1868–1938), Scottish-born American nurse
- Al Ward (1927–2021), American football executive
- Alan Ward (disambiguation), multiple people
- Albert Ward (disambiguation), multiple people
- Alex Ward (American football) (born 1999), American football player
- Alexander Ward (born 1990), British tennis player
- Alf Ward (1883–1926), English footballer
- Alfred Dudley Ward (1905–1991), British Army officer
- Alfred G. Ward (1908–1982), U.S. Navy admiral
- Algy Ward (1959–2023), English musician
- Alice Ward (disambiguation), multiple people
- Alie Ward (born 1976), American television personality
- Amelita Ward (1923–1987), American actress
- Andre Ward (born 1984), American boxer
- Andrew Ward (disambiguation), multiple people
- Anita Ward (born 1956), American musician
- Ann Ward (born 1991), American fashion model
- Anne Ward (suffragist) (1825–1896), British-New Zealand temperance leader
- Anne V. Ward (1877–1971), Scottish-born American educator
- Anthony Ward (born 1957), British theatre designer
- Arnold Ward (1876–1950), British journalist and politician
- Artemas Ward (disambiguation), multiple people
- Ashleigh Ward (born 1994), New Zealand footballer
- Ashley Ward (born 1970), English footballer

=== B ===
- Barbara Ward (1914–1981), British economist and writer
- Barbara E. Ward (1919–1983), British anthropologist
- Barry Ward (disambiguation), multiple people
- Ben Ward (disambiguation), multiple people
- Bernard Ward (disambiguation), multiple people
- Bill Ward (disambiguation), multiple people
- B. J. Ward (disambiguation), several people:
  - B. J. Ward (actress) (born 1944), American actress
  - BJ Ward (poet) (born 1967), American poet
  - B. J. Ward (American football) (born 1981), American football player
- Brad Ward (born 1956), Canadian politician
- Brandon Ward (soccer) (born 1972), American soccer player
- Brennan Ward (born 1988), American mixed martial artist
- Brent Ward (born 1979), New Zealand rugby union player
- Brian Ward (born 1973), American football coach and player
- Brian Ward (cricketer) (born 1944), English cricketer
- Bryan Ward (born 1972), American baseball player
- Bryan Ward (priest) (1906–1989), Australian clergyman
- Burt Ward (born 1946), American actor

=== C ===
- Callan Ward (born 1990), Australian rules footballer
- Cam Ward (born 1984), Canadian hockey player
- Cam Ward (politician) (born 1971), American politician
- Carisa Zhavia Ward (born 1986), American singer-songwriter
- Carla Ward (born 1983), English football coach and former player
- Caroline Ward (born 1969), Australian cricket player
- Catherine Ward (born 1987), Canadian ice hockey player
- Channing Ward (born 1992), American football player
- Charles Ward (disambiguation), multiple people
- Charvarius Ward (born 1996), American football player
- Chris Ward (disambiguation), multiple people
- Christopher Ward (disambiguation), multiple people
- Chuck Ward (1894–1969), American baseball player
- Claire Ward (born 1972), British politician
- Clara Ward (1924–1973), American singer
- Clarissa Ward (born 1980) British-American journalist for CNN
- Clifford T. Ward (1944–2001), English singer-songwriter
- Corey Ward, American rapper
- Cory Ward (born 1974), American curler

=== D ===
- Daniel Ward (disambiguation), multiple people
- Danielle Ward (born 1978), British comedian and writer
- Darrell Ward (1964–2016), American television personality
- Darren Ward (disambiguation), multiple people
- Daryle Ward (born 1975), American baseball player
- Dave Ward (disambiguation), multiple people
- David Ward (disambiguation), multiple people
- Dawn Ward (disambiguation), multiple people
- Dennis Ward (disambiguation), multiple people
- Denzel Ward (born 1997), American football player
- Derek Ward (disambiguation), multiple people
- Don Ward (disambiguation), multiple people
- Donald Ward (1914–??), English rugby league footballer
- Donald J. Ward (1930–2004), American folklorist
- Doris M. Ward (1932–2018), American politician
- Duane Ward (born 1964), American baseball player

=== E ===
- Ebenezer Ward (1837–1917), Australian politician
- Ed Ward (disambiguation), multiple people
- Eddie Ward (1899–1963), Australian politician
- Edmund Ward (disambiguation), multiple people
- Edward Ward (disambiguation), multiple people
- Edwin Ward (1919–2005), English priest
- Elijah Ward (1816–1882), American politician
- Elisha Ward (1804–1860), American politician
- Elizabeth Grace Ward (born 1961), American actress
- Elliot Ward (born 1993), English footballer
- Elliott Ward (born 1985), English footballer
- Emily Ward (1850–1930), English teacher
- Eric Ward (disambiguation), multiple people
- Evelyn Ward (1923–2012), American actress
- Evelyn Svec Ward (1921–1989), American fiber artist

=== F ===
- Felicity Ward (born 1980), Australian comedian
- Frances Ward (1611–1697), English peer
- Frances Ward (priest) (born 1959), Anglican priest and theologian
- Frank Ward (disambiguation), multiple people
- Fred Ward (1942–2022), American actor
- Freda Dudley Ward (1894–1983), English socialite
- Frederick Ward (disambiguation), multiple people

=== G ===
- Gareth Ward (born 1981), Australian politician
- Garry Ward, rugby league footballer
- Gary Ward (disambiguation), multiple people
- Gemma Ward (born 1987), Australian supermodel and actor
- Gene Ward (1943–2025), American politician in Hawaii
- Geoffrey C. Ward (born 1940), American historian
- George Ward (disambiguation), multiple people
- Gerald Ward (disambiguation), multiple people
- Gerry Ward (disambiguation), multiple people
- Glenn Ward (born 1957), Australian rules footballer
- Grant Ward (born 1994), English football player
- Greg Ward (born 1995), American football player
- Gregory Ward, American linguist

=== H ===
- H. J. Ward (1909–1945), American illustrator
- Hansford Ward (1817–1903), Australian ship captain
- Harry Ward (disambiguation), multiple people
- Helen Ward (disambiguation), multiple people
- Henry Ward (disambiguation), multiple people
- Herbert Ward (disambiguation), multiple people
- Hines Ward (born 1976), American football player
- Holcombe Ward (1878–1976), American tennis player
- Horace Ward (1927–2016), American judge
- Hugh J. Ward (1871–1941) American comic actor

=== J ===
- Jack Ward (1553–1622), English pirate
- Jack Ward (ice hockey), Canadian hockey player
- Jacob Ward (born 1974), American journalist
- James Ward (disambiguation), multiple people
- Jamie Ward (born 1986), British footballer
- Janet Ward (1925–1995), American actress
- Jared Ward (born 1988), American long-distance runner
- Jason Ward (disambiguation), multiple people
- Jay Ward (disambiguation), multiple people
- Jeff Ward (disambiguation), multiple people
- Jennifer Ward (disambiguation), multiple people
- Jeremy Ward (disambiguation), multiple people
- Jerry Ward (disambiguation), multiple people
- Jesmyn Ward (born 1977), American novelist
- Jessie Ward (born 1979), American television producer
- Jessie Ward (actress) (born 1982), American actress
- Jihad Ward (born 1994), American football player
- Jillian Ward (born 2005), Filipino actress and model
- Jim Ward (disambiguation), multiple people
- Joanne Ward (born 1975), British tennis player
- Joe Ward (disambiguation), multiple people
- Joel Ward (disambiguation), multiple people
- John Ward (disambiguation), multiple people
- JoJo Ward (born 1997), American football player
- Jonathan Ward (disambiguation), multiple people
- Joseph Ward (disambiguation), multiple people
- Josephine Ward (1864–1932), British novelist
- Joshua Ward (1685–1761), English doctor
- Joshua John Ward (1800–1853), American slaveholder
- Julia Ward (1900–1962), American cryptologist
- Julian Ward (born 17 June 1981), English Association football executive and former footballer
- Julia Rush Cutler Ward (1796–1824), American poet

=== K ===
- Kate Lucy Ward (1833–1915), British composer
- Keith Ward (born 1938), British philosopher
- Kelli Ward (born 1969), American politician
- Kelly Ward (born 1956), American actor
- Ken Ward (born 1935), Australian rules footballer
- Ken Ward Jr., American reporter
- Kenny Ward (born 1963), Scottish footballer
- Kevin Ward (disambiguation), multiple people
- Kim Ward, American politician
- Kimbell Ward (born 1983), Saint Kitts and Nevis football referee
- Kyle Ward (disambiguation), multiple people

=== L ===
- Lafe Ward (1925–2013), American lawyer and politician
- Lance Ward (born 1978), Canadian ice hockey player
- Larry Ward (disambiguation), multiple people
- Lauren Ward (born 1970), American singer and actress
- Laurie Ward (1911–??), Australian rugby league footballer
- Lawrence Ward (disambiguation), multiple people
- Lesley Ward, Australian mathematician
- Lesley Ward (diver) (born 1970), British diver
- Leslie Ward (1851–1922), British caricaturist
- Leslie Ward (cricketer) (1908–1981), English cricketer
- Lester Frank Ward (1841–1913), American biologist and sociologist
- Liam Ward (1930–2022), Irish jockey
- Linda Ann Ward (born 1947), Canadian skater
- Lorenzo Ward (born 1967), American football coach
- Luca Ward (born 1960), Italian actor and dubber
- Lyman Ward (disambiguation), multiple people

=== M ===
- M. Ward (born 1973), American singer-songwriter and guitarist
- Maisie Ward (1889–1975), British writer and publisher
- Maitland Ward (born 1977), American pornographic actress
- Marcus Ward (disambiguation), multiple people
- Margaret Ward (disambiguation), multiple people
- Mark Ward (disambiguation), multiple people
- Mary Ward (disambiguation), multiple people
- Martin de Porres Ward (1918–1999), U.S. Black Catholic missionary
- Matthew Ward (disambiguation), multiple people
- May Alden Ward (1853–1918), American author
- McLain Ward (born 1975), American show jumping competitor
- Meg Ward, British disc jockey
- Megan Ward (born 1969), American actress
- Michael Ward (disambiguation), multiple people
- Micheal Ward (born 1995), English actor
- Micky Ward (born 1965), American boxer
- Mike Ward (disambiguation), multiple people
- Mitchell Ward, American football player
- Monica Ward (born 1965), Italian actress and voice actress
- Morgan Ward (1901–1963), American mathematician

=== N ===
- Nancy Ward (1738–1822/1824), American Cherokee leader
- Nancy L. Ward, American politician
- Natalie Ward (born 1975), Australian softball player
- Natalie Ward (politician), Australian politician
- Nathan Ward (ice hockey) (born 1981), Canadian hockey player
- Nathaniel Ward (disambiguation), multiple people
- Neil B. Ward (1914–1972), American meteorologist
- Nicholas Ward (disambiguation), multiple people
- Nick Ward (disambiguation), multiple people

=== O ===
- Orlando Ward (1891–1972), American Army general

=== P ===
- Pat Ward (politician) (1957–2012), American politician
- Patricio O'Ward (born 1999), Mexican auto racing driver
- Patrick Ward (disambiguation), multiple people
- Paul Ward (disambiguation), multiple people
- Peter Ward (disambiguation), multiple people
- Pendleton Ward (born 1982), American animator
- Philip Ward (1924–2003), British Army officer
- Philip Henry Ward Jr. (1886–1963), American stamp dealer
- Phillip Ward (born 1974), American football player
- Preston Ward (1927–2013), American baseball player

=== R ===
- Rachel Ward (born 1957), English-born Australian actress
- Rebecca Ward (born 1990), American fencer
- Robbie Ward (born 1995), English rugby league footballer
- Robert Ward (disambiguation), multiple people
- Robin Ward (disambiguation), multiple people
- Rod Ward (born 1937), Australian rules footballer
- Rodger Ward (1921–2004), American racing driver
- Rodney Ward (figure skater), (1941–2022), British skater
- Roger Ward (born 1936), Australian actor
- Ron Ward (disambiguation), multiple people
- Ronald Ward (disambiguation), multiple people
- Ryan Ward (disambiguation), multiple people
- Ricky ward (born 1985), England

=== S ===
- Sallie Ward (1827–1896), American socialite
- Samuel Ward (disambiguation), multiple people
- Sandra Ward, British Virgin Islands civil servant
- Sarah Ward (disambiguation), multiple people
- Scooter Ward (born 1970), American musician
- Sela Ward (born 1956), American actress
- Shayne Ward (born 1984), British singer and actor
- Sheila Ward (1936–2019), British police officer
- Simon Ward (born 1983), Canadian singer
- Simon Ward (1941–2012), British actor
- Singin' Sammy Ward (1929–1996), American singer
- Sophie Ward (born 1964), British actor
- Steven Ward (born 1990), Irish professional boxer
- Susan Ward (born 1976), American actor

=== T ===
- T. J. Ward (born 1986), American football player
- Taylor Ward (baseball), American baseball player
- Taylor Ward (ice hockey), Canadian ice hockey player
- Ted Ward, Welsh rugby union footballer
- Terence Ward, author
- Terron Ward (born 1992), American football player
- Terry Ward (1939–1963), English footballer
- Terry W. Ward (1885–1929), American attorney and judge
- Thaddeus Ward (born 1997), American baseball player
- Theodore Ward (1902–1983), American playwright
- Thomas Ward (disambiguation), multiple people
- Tim Ward (disambiguation), multiple people
- Timothy Ward (born 1968), English cricketer
- Tony Ward (disambiguation), multiple people
- Tracy Posner Ward (born 1962), American animal rights activist
- Troy G. Ward (born 1962), American ice hockey coach
- Turner Ward (born 1965), American baseball player and coach
- Tyler Ward (born 1988), American musician

=== V ===
- Vada Ward, (1917 or 1918–?), American actress, journalist, public relations practitioner, film writer, and speech coach
- Vanessa Ward (born 1963), Australian high jumper
- Victoria Ward (disambiguation), multiple people
- Vicki Ward (born 1969), Australian politician
- Vicky Ward (born 1969), British-American journalist and author
- Vonda Ward (born 1973), American boxer and basketball player

=== W ===
- Walter Ward (disambiguation), multiple people
- Ward Wellington Ward (1875–1932), American architect
- Warren Ward (basketball) (born 1989), Canadian basketball player
- Warren Ward (footballer) (born 1962), English footballer
- Wilfrid Ward (1856–1916), British biographer
- Wilkie Ward (1884–1958), English Footballer
- William Ward (disambiguation), multiple people

=== Z ===
- Zack Ward (born 1970), Canadian actor
- Zhavia Ward (born 2001), American singer-songwriter
- ZZ Ward (born 1986), American singer-songwriter

== Fictional characters ==
- Alice Ward, a character in Utopia
- Charles Ward, an H.P. Lovecraft character
- Grant Ward, character in the television show Agents of S.H.I.E.L.D.
- J. D. Ward, main antagonist from High Noon, Part II: The Return of Will Kane
- John Ward, main protagonist of Faith: The Unholy Trinity
- Judith Ward, a preloaded character in The Sims 4: Get Famous
- Luke Ward, character in the television program, The O.C.
- Mycroft Ward, main antagonist from The Raw Shark Texts
- Thomas Ward, main protagonist from the Spook's series
- Risa Ward, a main character in the book series Unwind
- Victor Ward, main character of the Bret Easton Ellis novel Glamorama
- Vivian Ward, title character in the film Pretty Woman
