= Senator Ward =

Senator Ward may refer to:

== Members of the United States Senate ==
- Matthias Ward (1805–1861), U.S. Senator from Texas

== United States state senate members ==
- Cam Ward (politician) (born 1971), Alabama State Senate
- David E. Ward (1909–1995), Florida State Senate
- David Jenkins Ward (1871–1961), Maryland State Senate
- Durbin Ward (1819–1886), Ohio State Senate
- Elisha Ward (1804–1860), New York State Senate
- Giles Ward (born 1948), Mississippi State Senate
- Hallett Sydney Ward (1870–1956), North Carolina State Senate
- Henry Ward (Kentucky politician) (1909–2002), Kentucky State Senate
- Horace Ward (1927–2016), Georgia State Senate
- James Ward (frontiersman) (1763–1846), Kentucky State Senate
- Jasper D. Ward (1829–1902), Illinois State Senate
- Jerry Ward (born 1948), Alaska State Senate
- Jim Ward (Kansas politician) (born 1957), Kansas State Senate
- John Elliott Ward (1814–1902), Georgia State Senate
- John F. Ward (1904–1973), Maine State Senate
- John Ward (South Carolina politician) (1767–1816), South Carolina Senate
- Jonathan Ward (politician) (1768–1842), New York State Senate
- Joseph D. Ward (1914–2003), Massachusetts State Senate
- Judy Ward (fl. 2010s), Pennsylvania State Senate
- Kelli Ward (born 1969), Arizona State Senate
- Kim Ward (fl. 2000s), Pennsylvania State Senate
- Lafe Ward (1925–2013), West Virginia State Senate
- Pat Ward (politician) (1957–2012), Iowa State Senate
- Peter Ward (New York politician) (1827–1891), New York State Senate
- Rick Ward III (born 1982), Louisiana State Senate
- Ruth Ward (born 1936), New Hampshire Senate
- Steve Ward (Colorado legislator) (fl. 1990s–2000s), Colorado State Senate

== See also ==
- Janie Ward-Engelking (fl. 2010s–present), Idaho State Senate
- Stewart Ward, fictional U.S. Senator from New York in Marvel Comics
- Senator Warder (disambiguation)
