= Geoff Ward =

Geoff Ward may refer to:

- Geoff Ward (academic) (born 1954), British academic specializing in American literature
- Geoff Ward (cricketer) (1926–2008), English cricketer
- Geoff Ward (footballer) (born 1946), Australian rules footballer
- Geoff Ward (ice hockey) (born 1962), ice hockey coach
- Geoffrey C. Ward (born 1940), American editor, author, historian and scriptwriter
- Geoffrey Ward (rugby league), rugby league footballer of the 1950s and 1960s

== See also ==
- Jeff Ward (disambiguation)
