= Paul Ward =

Paul Ward may refer to:

- Paul Ward (footballer) (born 1963), English footballer
- Paul Ward (American football) (1937–2018), American football defensive tackle
- Paul John Ward (born 1964), British racing car driver
- Paul Joseph Ward (born 1964), historian
- Paul Langdon Ward (1911–2005), American academic, fifth president of Sarah Lawrence College
- Paul W. Ward (1905–1976), American journalist
- Paul "Hippo" Ward, Irish gangster convicted and later found innocent on appeal of the murder of Veronica Guerin
- Paul Ward (judge) (1980–1972), associate justice of the Arkansas Supreme Court
