= Frederick Ward =

Frederick Ward may refer to:

- Frederick Townsend Ward (1831–1862), American sailor and mercenary
- Frederick Wordsworth Ward aka, Captain Thunderbolt (1833–1870), Australian bushranger
- Frederick William Ward (1874–1934), Australian newspaper editor
- Frederick Ward (Australian politician) (1873–1954), Australian senator
- Frederick Ward (cricketer) (1881–1948), English cricketer, played one first class game for Yorkshire
- Frederick Ward (theatre) (born 1887), Australian actor and theatre businessman
- Fred Ward (rugby league) (1932–2012), English footballer and coach
- Frederick N. Ward (1935–2016), photojournalist
- Fred Ward (1942–2022), American actor
- Yaffer Ward (Frederick Ward, 1895–1953), English footballer
- Frederick Charles Ward (1900–1990), furniture and interior designer in Australia
- Fred Ward (writer) (1937–2017), African-Canadian poet, writer and professor
- Fred Ward (runner) (born 1895), American marathoner, 3rd at the 1933 USA Outdoor Track and Field Championships

== See also ==
- Frederic Ward Putnam (1839–1915), American naturalist and anthropologist
- Frederic Warde (1894–1939), typographic designer
- Frederick Warde (1851–1935), Shakespearean actor
- Frederick Warde (cricketer) (1852–1899), English cricketer
- Frederick Ward Merriman (1818–1865), New Zealand politician
