= St Clement Danes School =

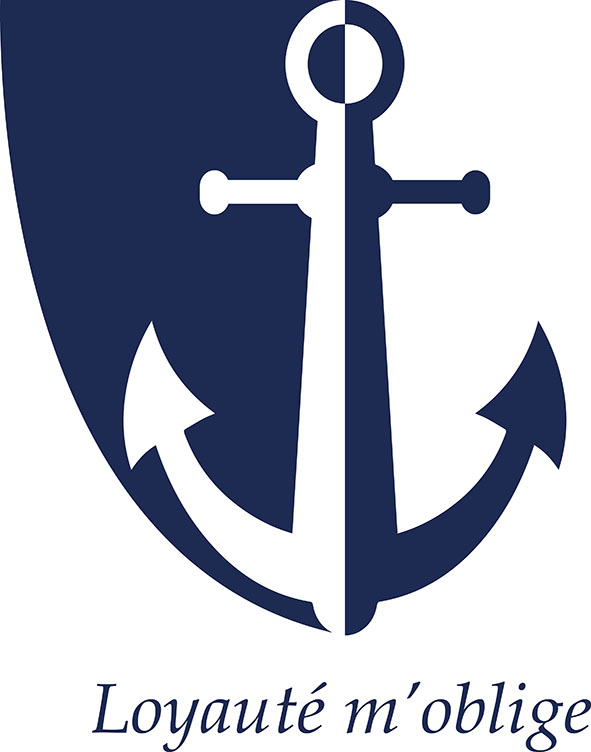

Location
- Chenies Road; Chorleywood, Hertfordshire, WD3 6EW; England
- 51.6637°N 0.514°W

Information
- Type: Academy
- Motto: Loyauté M'Oblige (Loyalty has its Obligations)
- Established: 1862
- Department for Education URN: 136901 Tables
- Ofsted: Reports
- Head teacher: Toby Sutherland
- Gender: Mixed
- Age: 11 to 18
- Enrolment: 1,578
- Houses: 8 houses
- Website: http://www.stclementdanes.org.uk/

St Clement Danes School is a co-educational academy school for pupils aged 11 to 18 in Chorleywood, Hertfordshire.

== Admissions ==
St Clement Danes is a partially selective school, providing education to students aged 11 (year 7) through to 18 (year 13). Most students are admitted based on proximity to the school, with priority given to students with siblings already at the school, or whose parents are staff at the school, but up to 10% of the year 7 cohort are admitted based on performance in the eleven-plus exam, and a further 10% may be admitted based on performance in a musical aptitude test. Entry to the sixth form in year 12 is dependent on GCSE exam grades, and admissions are mainly from students already at the school, but there is also an additional intake of external students.

== Location ==
The school occupies a large site to the northwest of Rickmansworth in Chorleywood. It is about a mile (1.6 km) from Chorleywood station, and is served by buses from the station and Watford. It is situated on Chenies Road (A404), which at that point occupies the boundary of Hertfordshire and Buckinghamshire for a half-mile, adjacent to the north side of the school. The school is less than a mile west of junction 18 of the M25.

== History ==
The school was founded in 1862 by the church wardens of St Clement Danes parish in Aldwych, London and opened in Houghton Street. It was funded from income from the St Clement Danes Holborn Estate, a charity founded in 1551 which owned a piece of land on the north side of Holborn.

=== Grammar school (Holborn & Hammersmith) ===
The first St Clement Danes Holborn Estate Grammar School for Boys was established in 1862 in Houghton Street Holborn, near to the church.

In 1928, the school transferred to a new site on Du Cane Road in Hammersmith, where it flourished as St. Clement Danes Grammar School until 1975. The school had a well-known choir which featured in a 1975 EMI recording (ASD 3117) of Carl Orff's Carmina Burana, conducted by André Previn with the LSO (and chorus). The site was next to Hammersmith Hospital, and is now occupied by St Clement's House, a block of flats and Wood Lane High School.

On 29 June 1973, 13-year-old Nicholas St Clair from Fulham was killed on the school playing fields when he was struck in the chest by a javelin thrown by a fellow student. A verdict of accidental death was recorded by the coroner following an inquest into the incident.

=== Comprehensive (Chorleywood) ===
In 1975, under an agreement between the governing board of the school and Hertfordshire County Council, it was re-established in new premises in Chorleywood, as a voluntary-aided mixed comprehensive school. In April 1994 the school was incorporated as a grant-maintained school. The Du Cane Road buildings were taken over by Burlington Danes Church of England School, sold to Hammersmith Hospital in 2002 and demolished in 2004.

The school receives additional financial support from the St Clement Danes School Charitable Foundation, one of the beneficiaries of the historic St Clement Danes Holborn Estate.

=== Academy (Chorleywood) ===
The school converted to academy status in July 2011. In 2016, the school became part of the Danes Educational Trust, a multiple-academy trust, which also includes Croxley Danes School, Chancellor's School, Elstree Screen Arts Academy and Onslow St Audrey's School.

== Houses ==
The house system was introduced in 1907 with four houses: Clare, Temple, Clement and Dane. By 1938 the school had grown and two new houses were added: Burleigh and Lincoln. Essex and Exeter were subsequently introduced in 1952. On the move to Hertfordshire, the school reverted to six houses, with Clare and Essex not being reintroduced until 2005.

== Commemoration ==
Every year a commemoration service is held in St Clement Danes Church in London to commemorate the foundation of the school. The orchestra and choir participate. Years 7, 11 and 13 visit the church in London, whilst years 8, 9 and 12 attend a service held at the school in Chorleywood. The school's song "The Anchor Is Our Emblem" is sung at the church.

== Notable former pupils ==
=== Boys' grammar school in London ===
- Sir John Barbirolli, conductor and cellist
- Tony Dornhorst, professor, physician
- Wally Downes, Wimbledon football player
- Frank Field, politician
- Martin Fitzmaurice, darts master of ceremonies
- Andy Fraser, bass guitarist, songwriter and sometimes studio piano player with Free: famous for "All Right Now" (co-writer).
- John Jackson, Crystal Palace goalkeeper
- Ben Levene, artist
- Hugh Lindsay (born 1938), English amateur footballer who played for Southampton and appeared in the 1960 Summer Olympics
- Glen Matlock, bass guitarist and songwriter with the Sex Pistols
- Mikey Craig, bass player with Culture Club
- Michael Oliver, broadcaster on Radio 3 and on Radio 4's Kaleidoscope
- Dennis Potter, television playwright, director, novelist
- John Slater, actor
- David Stoddart, Baron Stoddart of Swindon, Labour MP from 1970 to 1983 for Swindon
- Michael Ward, economist who developed international economic statistics
- Alan Wilder, former keyboard player for Depeche Mode
- Alan Winstanley, Record Producer

=== Mixed comprehensive school in Hertfordshire ===
- Katy Brand, comedienne
- Dee Caffari, record-breaking sailor
- Natasha Khan, singer and musician, Bat For Lashes
- Tim Lovejoy, TV presenter
- Rob Kiernan, professional footballer
- Lee Canoville, professional footballer
- Jack Garratt, singer and multi-instrumentalist
- Griff, singer
- Liam Watson, record producer
- Matt Turmaine, Member of Parliament for Watford (2024–present)
- Jack Rooke, writer and comedian

== Notable former staff ==
- Mark Warburton, head coach of Queens Park Rangers, coached part-time at the school
- Andrew Davies, screenwriter, taught English 1958–61.
- Bill Ashton, jazz musician and founder of the National Youth Jazz Orchestra, taught French 1971–73.
- Roland Mathias, poet
- Jonathon Porritt, eco-politician, taught English and directed Drama 1974–77
