= David Ward =

David Ward may refer to:

== Entertainers ==
- David C. Ward (born 1952), American historian, poet and author
- David Oren Ward (1971–1999), American actor
- David S. Ward (born 1945), American screenwriter and film director
- David Ward (bass) (1922–1983), Scottish operatic bass
- Dave Ward (voice actor) (born 1957), Scottish-Canadian voice actor

== Politicians ==
- David Ward (British politician) (born 1953), British Liberal Democrat politician, MP for Bradford East (2010–2015)
- David Ward (Wisconsin politician) (born 1953), American Republican politician from Wisconsin
- David Ward (1936–2016), known as Kiviaq, Inuit lawyer, politician, and former athlete
- David E. Ward (1909–1995), American politician from Florida
- David Jenkins Ward (1871–1961), American politician from Maryland

== Sportspeople ==
- David Ward (American football end) (1907–1982), American football end
- David Ward (linebacker) (born 1964), American football player
- David Ward (bowls) (1945–2005), England lawn and indoor bowler
- David Ward (cricketer, born 1981), Australian-born English former cricketer
- David Ward (rugby league) (born 1953), English rugby league footballer
- David Ward (Surrey cricketer) (born 1961), English batsman
- Dave Ward (rugby union) (born 1985), English rugby union player

== Others ==
- David Ward (palaeontologist) (born 1948), British palaeontologist
- David Ward (sheriff), law enforcement officer in Oregon
- David Ward (university president) (born 1938), president of the American Council on Education, 2001–2008
- Dave Ward (reporter) (1939–2025), American news anchor
- Dave Ward (trade unionist) (born 1959), leader of the Communication Workers Union

== See also ==
- David Ward King (1857–1920), farmer and inventor
- David Ward-Steinman (1936–2015), composer
