= Jerry Ward (disambiguation) =

Jerry Ward (born 1948), former member of the Alaska Legislature.

Jerry Ward may also refer to:

- Jerry Ward, musician in The Strangers (American band)
- Jerry Ward (basketball), see Boston Celtics draft history
- Jerry Ward (American football) on List of Dayton Flyers in the NFL draft

== See also ==
- Gerry Ward (disambiguation)
- Gerald Ward (disambiguation)
- Gerard Ward, see ANU Research School of Asia & the Pacific
- Jeremy Ward (disambiguation)
