= Weasel (comics) =

Weasel, in comics may refer to:

- Weasel (Marvel Comics)
- Weasel (DC Comics), the name of two DC Comics supervillains
- Weasel, comic book series by Dave Cooper
- Gino the weasel comic series

== See also ==
- Weasel (disambiguation)
