= Dornhorst =

Dornhorst is a surname. Notable people with the surname include:

- Frederick Dornhorst (1849–1927), Ceylonese (Sri Lankan) barrister and King's Advocate
- Tony Dornhorst (1915–2003), British physician and medical educator
