= B. J. Ward =

B. J. or BJ Ward may refer to:

- B. J. Ward (actress) (born 1944), American actress
- B. J. Ward (American football) (born 1981), American football player
- BJ Ward (poet) (born 1967), American poet
