= Andrew Ward =

Andrew Ward may refer to:

- Andrew Ward (author) (born 1946), American writer of historical nonfiction
- Andrew Ward (cricketer) (born 1981), English cricketer
- Andrew H. Ward (1815–1904), U.S. representative from Kentucky
- Andrew J. Ward (1843–1914), Michigan politician
- Andrew Thomas Ward, Canadian politician
- Andy Ward (musician) (born 1952), English drummer with various progressive rock bands
- Andy Ward (rugby union) (born 1970), Irish rugby union player
- Andrew Ward (sprinter) (born 1895), American sprinter, 100 yards and 200 yards winner at the 1917 USA Outdoor Track and Field Championships

== See also ==
- Andrew Warde (1597–1659), English American colonist, judge, and farmer in New England
