= Ben Ward =

Ben, Bennie or Benjamin Ward may refer to:

- Ben Ward (rugby union) (born 1984), English rugby union player-coach
- Bennie Ward (born 1948), American theoretical particle physicist
- Benjamin Ward (1926–2002), first black New York City Police Commissioner
- Benjamin Ward (cricketer) (born 1998), Jersey cricketer
- Benjamin F. Ward (1948–2013), professor of philosophy
- Ben Ward (singer), British singer with Orange Goblin
- Ben Ward (footballer) (born 2004), for Burnley and Swindon Town

== See also ==
- Benjamin Ward Richardson (1828–1896), British physician
- Ward (surname)
- Ward (given name)
