= Eric Ward =

Eric Ward may refer to:

- Eric Ward (Australian footballer) (1913–2010), Australian rules footballer
- Eric Ward (quarterback) (born 1987), gridiron football quarterback
- Eric Ward (wide receiver) (born 1990), American football wide receiver
- Eric Ward (The O.C.)
