= Adam Ward =

Adam Ward may refer to:

- Adam Ward (baseball) (born 1986), American baseball coach and player
- Adam Ward (murder victim) (1988–2015), photojournalist
- Adam Kelly Ward (1982–2016), American convicted murderer

== See also ==
- Adam v Ward, a 1919 House of Lords case
