= Derek Ward =

Derek Ward or Derrick Ward may refer to:

- Derek Harland Ward (1917–1942), New Zealand flying ace
- Derrick Ward (footballer) (1934–2011), footballer
- Derek Ward (footballer) (born 1972), see List of Bury F.C. players (25–99 appearances)
- Derrick Ward (born 1980), American football running back

== See also ==
- Ward (surname)
