= Tony Ward =

Tony or Anthony Ward may refer to:

- Tony Ward (Australian actor) (1924–2006), Australian television actor and current affairs reporter
- Tony Ward (designer) (born 1970), Lebanese-Italian fashion designer
- Tony Ward (footballer) (born 1970), English footballer
- Tony Ward (model) (born 1963), American model, actor, fashion designer and photographer
- Tony Ward (referee) (born 1941), British Association Football referee
- Tony Ward (rugby union) (born 1954), Irish rugby union player and footballer
- Anthony Ward (born 1957), British theatre designer
- Anthony Ward, British commodities trader and hedge fund manager for Armajaro

== See also ==
- Anthony Warde (1908–1975), American actor
