= Albert Ward =

Albert Ward may refer to:

- Albert Ward (cricketer, born 1865) (1865–1939), English first-class cricketer
- Albert Ward (cricketer, born 1896) (1896–1979), English cricketer
- Albert Ward (film director) (1870–1956), British screenwriter and film director
- Sir Albert Lambert Ward, 1st Baronet (1865–1939), British Conservative Member of Parliament
- Reg Ward (Albert Joseph Ward, 1927–2011), first Chief Executive of the London Docklands Development Corporation
