= Jennifer Ward =

Jennifer Ward may refer to:

- Jennifer Ward (author) (born 1963), American children's picture book author
- Jennifer Ward (journalist) (born 1957), Canadian broadcast journalist
- Jennifer C. Ward (diplomat) (born 1944), United States ambassador to Niger
- Jennifer C. Ward (historian), British historian
