= Nathaniel Ward (disambiguation) =

Nathaniel Ward (1578–1652) was a clergyman and pamphleteer.

Nathaniel Ward may also refer to:

- Nathaniel Bagshaw Ward (1791–1868), English doctor and botanist
- Nathaniel Ward, musician in The Weasels

== See also ==
- Nathan Ward (disambiguation)
