= Charles Ward =

Charles Ward may refer to:

== Government and politics ==
- Charles B. Ward (1879–1946), U.S. representative from New York
- Charles Ward (deputy governor of Bombay), 1682–1683
- Dudley Ward (judge) (Charles Dudley Robert Ward, 1827–1913), New Zealand judge and Member of Parliament
- Charles Ward (Irish politician) (born 1977)
- Charlie Ward (content creator) (born 1960), British right-wing content creator and conspiracy theorist

== Sports ==
- Charles Ward (cricketer, born 1875) (1875–1954), English cricketer
- Charles Ward (cricketer, born 1838) (1838–1892), English cricketer and clergyman
- Chuck Ward (1894–1969), American baseball player
- Charlie Ward (born 1970), American basketball and football player
- Charlie Ward (golfer) (1911–2001), English golfer
- Charlie Ward (fighter) (born 1980), Irish MMA fighter
- Charlie Ward (footballer) (born 1995), British footballer

== Others ==
- Charles Ward (VC) (1877–1921), English recipient of the Victoria Cross
- Charles Caleb Ward (1831–1896), Canadian painter
- Charles Melbourne Ward (1903-1966), Australian stage performer, naturalist, historian and marine collector
- Charles Willis Ward (1856–1920), American businessman and conservationist
- Charles Ward, British co-founder of Rockfield Studios
- Charles Dexter Ward, title character of The Case of Charles Dexter Ward, a novel by H. P. Lovecraft
