= Weasel (disambiguation) =

A weasel is a small carnivorous mammal.

Weasel may also refer to:

== Places ==
- Weasel Gap, Prince Charles Mountains, Antarctica
- Weasel Hill, Graham Land, Antarctica

== People ==
- Weasel Walter, jazz composer and instrumentalist
- Ben Weasel (born 1968), punk rock musician (born Benjamin Foster)
- Jimmy Fratianno (1913–1993), American gangster, known as Jimmy the Weasel
- Robert Guiscard (c. 1015–1085), Norman adventurer, known as the Weasel
- Bobby Heenan (1944-2017), American professional wrestling manager and commentator, sometimes called the weasel
- "The Weasel", an alter ego persona of Pauly Shore (born 1968), American actor, comedian, director, writer and producer
- Dave Weasel (real name Dave Wezl, born 1984), Canadian-American comedian

== Arts and entertainment ==
=== Fictional characters ===
- Weasel (DC Comics), two villains
- Weasel (Marvel Comics), a sidekick
- Weasel, in The Animals of Farthing Wood franchise
- Weasel, in the Crusader game series
- I.M. Weasel, in I Am Weasel, an American animated television series

=== Other ===
- The Weasels, a rock band
- Weasel, a comic book series by Dave Cooper

== Vehicles ==
- M29 Weasel, American World War II tracked vehicle
- Westland Weasel, a prototype British two-seat fighter/reconnaissance aircraft of the First World War
- Wiesel AWC, a German light air-transportable weapons carrier and armoured fighting vehicle (The name is in German, so it's Wiesel instead of Weasel)
- Weasel, an Owl class South Devon Railway 0-4-0 locomotives
- Weasel, a tug formerly called the Empire Madge

== Other uses ==
- Operation Weasel, an alleged secret operation involving the governments of Nauru, New Zealand and the United States

== See also ==
- Spinner's weasel, a mechanical yarn measuring device
- Weasel word, a statement designed to deceive with vague or unspecified authority
- "Pop! Goes the Weasel", 19th century song
