= Larry Ward =

Larry Ward may refer to:

- Larry Ward (actor) (1924–1985), American actor from the television series The Dakotas
- Larry Ward (linguist) (1944–2007), American actor and linguist who voiced Jabba the Hutt
- Larry Ward (politician) (born 1947), Canadian politician in Saskatchewan

== See also ==
- Lawrence M. Ward, neuroscientist and psychophysicist
- Laurie Ward, rugby league player
