= Gerry Ward =

Gerry Ward may refer to:

- Gerry Ward (footballer) (1936–1994), English footballer
- Gerry Ward (basketball) (1941–2026), American basketball player
- Gerry Ward (politician), member of the New Hampshire House of Representatives

== See also ==
- Jerry Ward (disambiguation)
- Gerald Ward (disambiguation)
- Jeremy Ward (disambiguation)
