= Nathan Ward =

Nathan Ward may refer to:

- Nathan Ward (ice hockey) (born 1981)
- Nathan Ward (missionary) (1804–1860)

== See also ==
- Nathaniel Ward (disambiguation)
