= Michael Ward =

Michael, Mike, or Micky Ward may refer to:

== Entertainment ==
- Micheal Ward (born 1997), Jamaican-born British actor
- Michael Ward (actor) (1909–1997), British actor
- Michael Ward (musician) (1967–2024), American guitarist
- Michael "Mudcat" Ward, American blues bassist, pianist and songwriter
- Michael Ward (singer, born 1959) (born 1959), child soprano
- Mike Ward (comedian) (born 1973), Canadian comedian, actor and writer from Quebec
- Mike Ward (singer) (born 1990), British musical artist

== Politics ==
- Michael Ward (British politician) (1931–2009), British Labour Party politician and MP for Peterborough
- Michael Ward (Irish politician) (1683–1759), Irish MP for Down and Bangor
- Michael E. Ward, American civil servant and politician
- Mike Ward (New Zealand politician) (born 1942), New Zealand Green Party politician
- Mike Ward (American politician) (born 1951), U.S. congressman from Kentucky and radio talk show host

== Sports ==
- Michael Ward (cricketer) (born 1971), British sportsman
- Michael Ward (mountaineer) (1925–2005), British doctor and mountaineer
- Michael Ward (rugby league) (born 1991), Ireland international rugby league footballer
- Micky Ward (rugby union) (born 1979), English rugby union coach and player
- Micky Ward (born 1965), American professional boxer and former WBU champion

== Other ==
- Michael Ward (bishop) (died 1681), Irish theologian and prelate
- Michael Ward (economist) (1939–2008), British economist and statistician
- Michael Ward (mountaineer) (1925–2005), English surgeon and expedition doctor on the 1953 first ascent of Everest
- Michael Ward (scholar) (born 1968), C. S. Lewis scholar
- Michael D. Ward (1948–2021), American political scientist and academic
- Michael Edward Ward (1845–1921), Irish-Australian detective
- Michael Francis Ward (1845–1881), Irish physician
- Michael J. Ward (born 1950), American CEO and president of CSX Corporation
- Michael Moses Ward, survivor of the 1985 MOVE bombing in Philadelphia, Pennsylvania
- Michael Ward, managing director of department store Harrods

== See also ==
- Jeremy Michael Ward (1976–2003), American sound technician and vocal operator
- Lothar Michael Ward (died 1978), commercial diver killed in Star Canopus diving accident
- Micheal Ward (born 1997), British actor
