= Jason Ward =

Jason Ward may refer to:

- Jason Ward (Gaelic footballer)
- Jason Ward (ice hockey) (born 1979), Canadian hockey player
- Jason Ward (naturalist), American naturalist
- Jason Ward, member of the band Rustic Overtones
