= Samuel Ward =

Samuel or Sam Ward may refer to:

- Samuel Ward (banker) (1786–1839), American banker
- Samuel Ward (field hockey) (born 1990), British field hockey player
- Samuel Ward (footballer) (1906–?), Scottish footballer
- Sam Ward (footballer, born 1880) (1880–1968), English footballer
- Samuel Ward (ice hockey) (born 1995), Swedish professional ice hockey goaltender
- Samuel Ward (lobbyist) (1814–1884), American political lobbyist and gourmet
- Samuel Ward (minister) (1577–1640), English Puritan minister of Ipswich
- Samuel Ward (Rhode Island politician) (1725–1776), governor of the Colony of Rhode Island and Providence Plantations and a delegate to the Continental Congress
- Samuel Ward (scholar) (1572–1643), English academic at Cambridge
- Samuel Ward (taster) (1732–1820), painted by Joseph Wright of Derby but known for being Bonnie Prince Charlie's taster
- Samuel Ward Jr. (1756–1832), American Revolutionary soldier and politician
- Samuel A. Ward (1847–1903), American organist and composer
- Samuel Baldwin Ward (1842–1915), American surgeon
- Samuel Gray Ward (1817–1907), American poet, Transcendentalist, banker, and patron of the arts
- Samuel Ringgold Ward (1817–c. 1860), African-American escaped slave, abolitionist and newspaper editor
- Sammy Ward (c. 1963–1992), leader of the paramilitary Irish People's Liberation Organisation's Belfast Brigade
- Samuel Ward, the co-composer of "Tell Her", a song sung by Frank Sinatra on his album That's Life

== See also ==
- Singin' Sammy Ward, stage name of American R&B singer James T. Woodley (1929–1996)
