= The Pitchforks of Duke University =

American all-male a cappella group

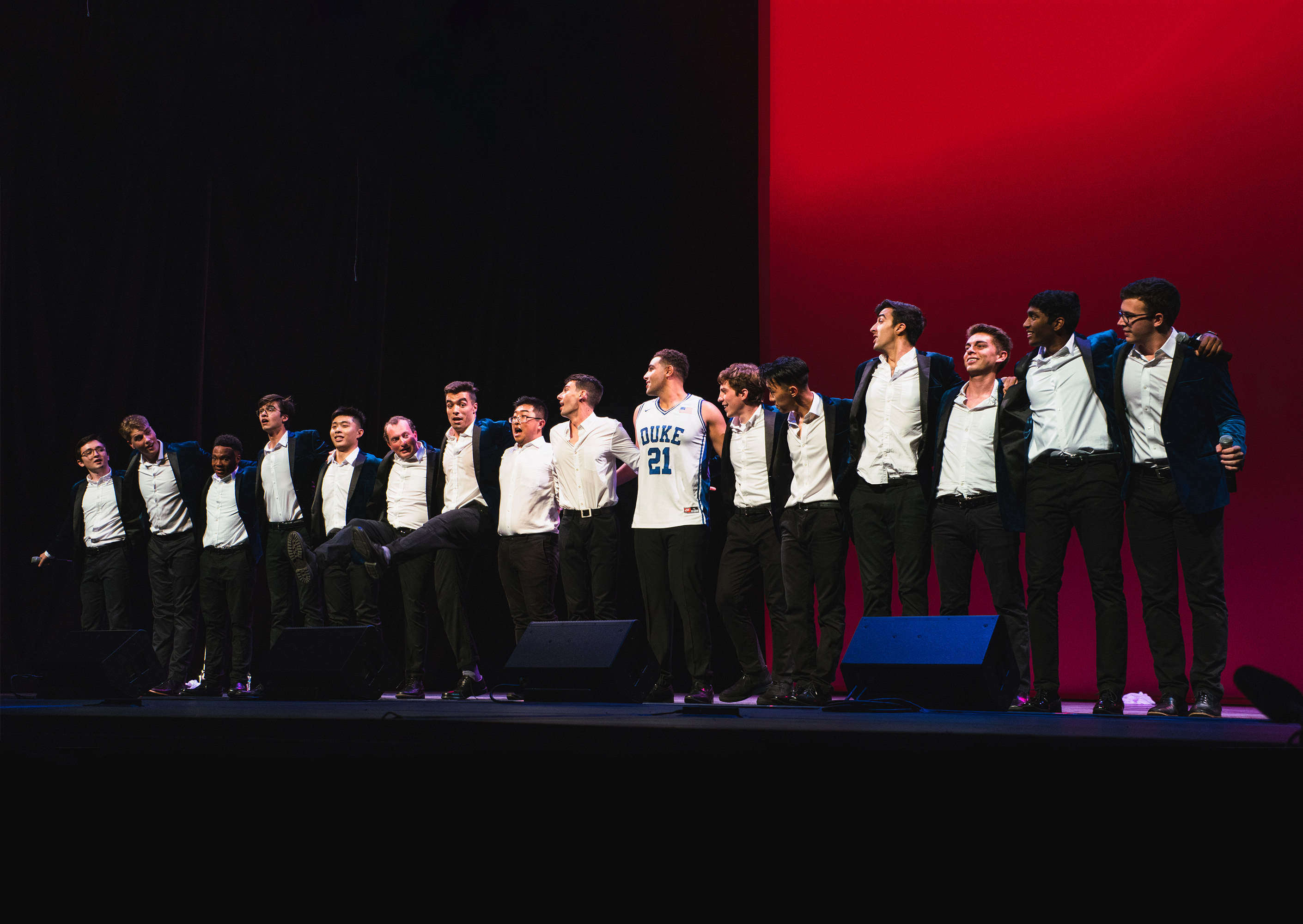
- The 2018–19 Forks performing during the annual Parent's Weekend Fall Classic Show at Duke University, 2018

Background information
- Also known as: The Duke Pitchforks; The Pitchforks; The Forks
- Origin: Durham, North Carolina, United States
- Genres: Collegiate a cappella
- Years active: 1979–present
- Website: Official website

The Pitchforks of Duke University, commonly referred to as "The Duke Pitchforks" or just "The Pitchforks", is Duke University's oldest continuing a cappella group. (In the late 1960s, there was a previous Duke men's group called "Chanticleer" (not to be confused with the San Francisco "Chanticleer"). The Pitchforks constitute one of Duke's two current all-male ensembles. Founded in 1979 with four members of a Duke Medical School quartet, the Pitchforks have performed across the world; they have sung for the Chicago Bulls and Durham Bulls, performed for Duke Men's Basketball, showcased for the Queen of Jordan, and opened for artists such as Ben Folds (2009) and The Band Perry (2015).

The Pitchforks have a long history of studio recording. They have released over 15 albums so far, two of which, "Bring It Back" (2006) and "Disconcert" (2008), won the Contemporary A Cappella Recording Award (CARA) for Best Male Collegiate Album. Seven of their tracks have been featured on the Best of College A Cappella (BOCA) compilation albums. The Pitchforks are best known for their rendition of "Black and Gold" (originally by Sam Sparro), which has over 2.5 million streams on Spotify.

From 1980 until 2013, the Pitchforks were led and mentored by Benjamin F. Ward (1948-2013) who served as both a creator and inspiration for the group. After his death in 2013, the Pitchforks got to work on an album to pay tribute to Ben and to reflect upon their future. The album, "Fall Asleep At Sunset", was released in December 2018.

== History ==
The Pitchforks began singing together in 1979 and was officially chartered as a Duke University student organization in 1981. The founding officers consisted of: Robert S. Clarke, Frank E. Block, James Bulleit, Elliott McCrory, and Kurt T. Uphoff.

The original Pitchforks members drew not only from the undergraduate student body but from Duke's graduate schools as well. Several of the founding Pitchforks, including founding "pitchpipe" or musical director Frank Block and Jeff Warren, had sung a cappella at Yale University prior to attending Duke. The original Pitchforks repertoire was built primarily on material from the Yale Songbook, including Whiffenpoofs standards like "Time After Time" and "Too Darn Hot," and even Yale's traditional school song, "Bright College Years."

In 1980, philosophy instructor Dr. Benjamin F. Ward was asked to be faculty advisor of The Pitchforks.

Ward was an accomplished pianist from childhood and a graduate of Morehouse College. A polymath who spoke multiple languages and pursued a lifelong interest in musical collaboration, he had received his Ph. D in philosophy at Yale in 1972 and then taught there until 1980. He was deeply involved in the campus musical world, and sang in the Battell Chapel choir.

After arriving at Duke in 1980, Ward became the seminal leader and mentor of the early Pitchforks. By its official chartering Ward had become a full member, singing in performances and serving as music director, a position which he held for four years.

Ward created The Pitchforks' Gothic Christmas Show and directed the performance for more than thirty years. After Ward's death in 2013, the Pitchforks dedicated the show to his memory.

The group has grown considerably in terms of repertoire over the past 30 years. At first, The Pitchforks primarily sang barbershop and traditional/folk music, such as country classic, "Carolina In My Mind" by James Taylor. As of 2019, their repertoire consists of a wide variety of music, spanning from old classics, such as The Beach Boys, to contemporary artists like Shawn Mendes and Ed Sheeran. Their rendition of "Fireflies" by Owl City won the CARA for Best Male Collegiate Arrangement in 2010.

The Pitchforks perform frequently throughout the year, in dorms, around Duke's campus, and across the world. Most notably, The Pitchforks toured Mexico City in the Spring of 2019 and made live appearances on Mexican TV shows "Xe Bandamax" and "Montse y Joe". Most recently, The Pitchforks performed for Governor Pedro Pierluisi of Puerto Rico during their Spring 2024 tour of Puerto Rico.

== Philanthropy ==
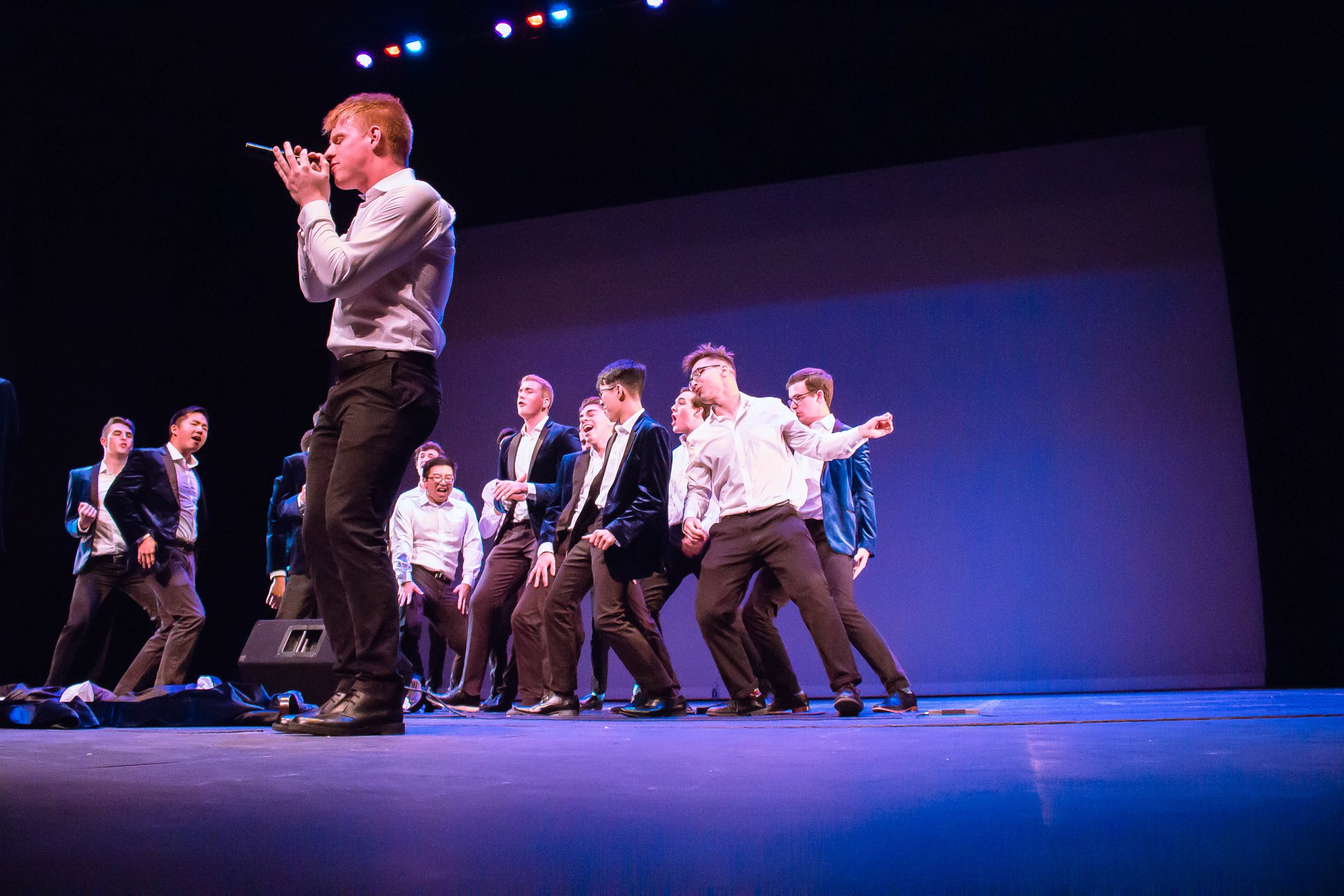
DUI-Pitchforks Valentine's Day Show 2018

The Pitchforks support a host of local organizations through hosting and performing at benefit concerts. A few prominent examples of the group's philanthropy are:

=== Charleston HALOS ===
The Pitchforks have an annual tradition of performing with the Plantation Singers in Charleston, SC to benefit Charleston HALOS. According to the HALOS website, they provide "assistance to abused and neglected children in Charleston, Berkeley and Dorchester Counties and to their kinship caregivers. Through a variety of programs and initiatives, [they] help improve the lives of these children."

=== Scott Carter Foundation for Pediatric Cancer Research ===
The Pitchforks also host benefit concerts right at home. Every year, The Pitchforks partner with Duke University Improv, the university's only improv comedy troupe, to put on a joint Valentine's Day Show. All of the proceeds earned from the show go directly to the Scott Carter Foundation for Pediatric Cancer Research.

=== The Fine Arts Center (FAC) of Kershaw County ===
The Pitchforks also support endeavors in the arts. They make a yearly appearance at Kershaw County, SC's Fine Arts Center for FAC Fridays in order to increase awareness of the arts within the community, to help fundraise for the center's activities, and to provide entertainment to the Kershaw County community.

== Notable alumni ==
- Benjamin F. Ward, American philosopher
- John Altieri, American Singer and Actor
- John Dear, American Priest and Peace Activist

== Awards and nominations ==
Year			Result	
1999	Contemporary A Cappella Recording Awards	Best Male Collegiate Arrangement	Jeff Horwich	Nominated
2001	Contemporary A Cappella Recording Awards	Best Male Collegiate Arrangement	"Crazy" by Jason Park	Nominated
2005	Contemporary A Cappella Recording Awards	Best Male Collegiate Album	Honestly	Nominated
2005	Contemporary A Cappella Recording Awards	Best Male Collegiate Song	"Write Me A Song" on Honestly	Nominated
2005	Contemporary A Cappella Recording Awards	Best Male Collegiate Arrangement	“Ain’t No Sunshine” by Joseph Bates	Won
2007	Contemporary A Cappella Recording Awards	Best Scholastic Original Song	"Nevermind" by Joseph Bates and Andrew Booth	Won
2007	Contemporary A Cappella Recording Awards	Best Male Collegiate Album	Bring It Back	Won
2007	Contemporary A Cappella Recording Awards	Best Male Collegiate Song	"Hysteria" on Bring It Back	Won
2007	Contemporary A Cappella Recording Awards	Best Male Collegiate Solo	Chris Bryant for "Used to Love U"	Nominated
2009	Contemporary A Cappella Recording Awards	Best Scholastic Original Song	"Dancin' Thru" by Chris Bryant	Nominated
2009	Contemporary A Cappella Recording Awards	Best Scholastic Original Song	"As You Go" by Andrew Booth	Won
2009	Contemporary A Cappella Recording Awards	Best Male Collegiate Album	Disconcert	Won
2009	Contemporary A Cappella Recording Awards	Best Male Collegiate Song	"Atlantic" on Disconcert	Runner-up
2009	Contemporary A Cappella Recording Awards	Best Male Collegiate Arrangement	"Atlantic" by Stephen Clark	Won
2011	Contemporary A Cappella Recording Awards	Best Scholastic Original Song	"Calling Out" by KC Steedle	Nominated
2011	Contemporary A Cappella Recording Awards	Best Male Collegiate Album	All In	Runner-up
2011	Contemporary A Cappella Recording Awards	Best Male Collegiate Song	"Fireflies" on All In	Won
2011	Contemporary A Cappella Recording Awards	Best Male Collegiate Arrangement	"Fireflies" by KC Steedle	Won
2013
2013	Contemporary A Cappella Recording Awards	Best Male Collegiate Album	Refraction	Runner-up
2013	Contemporary A Cappella Recording Awards	Best Male Collegiate Song	"Bright Lights Bigger City" on Refraction	Nominated
2013	Contemporary A Cappella Recording Awards	Best Male Collegiate Solo	Jay Kennedy for "Titanium"	Nominated
2013	Contemporary A Cappella Recording Awards	Best Male Collegiate Arrangement	"Hallelujah" by Chris Waybill	Won
2019	Contemporary A Cappella Recording Awards	Best Male Collegiate Solo	Johnathan Chou on "Too Good at Goodbyes"	Nominated
2023
2023	Contemporary A Cappella Recording Awards	Best Male Collegiate Album	Back to Earth	Nominated
2023	Contemporary A Cappella Recording Awards	Best Male Collegiate Arrangement	J.J. Moncus and Chris Kleypas for "Sanctify"	Nominated
2023	Contemporary A Cappella Recording Awards	Best Male Collegiate Solo	David Pfeiffer on "Sanctify"	Nominated
2023	Contemporary A Cappella Recording Awards	Best Male Collegiate Song	"Sanctify" from Back to Earth	Nominated

=== Best of College A Cappella Appearances ===
Year	Award	Category	Nominee(s)	Result	Ref.
1998	Varsity Vocals	Best of College A Cappella Compilation	"All I Want"	Featured	
2004	Varsity Vocals	Best of College A Cappella Compilation	"Write Me A Song"	Featured	
2006	Varsity Vocals	Best of College A Cappella Compilation	"Tribute"	Featured	
2009	Varsity Vocals	Best of College A Cappella Compilation	"Home"	Featured	
2011	Varsity Vocals	Best of College A Cappella Compilation	"Black and Gold"	Featured	
2013	Varsity Vocals	Best of College A Cappella Compilation	"All of the Lights"	Featured	
2019	Varsity Vocals	Best of College A Cappella Compilation	"Perfect"	Featured	

== Discography ==
The Pitchforks have now produced over 21 albums, each with a unique theme and texture. Most recent albums are available on streaming platforms.

- The Pitchforks of Duke University (1983)
- It's Not Rock 'n' Roll but I Like It (1984)
- A Few Good Cuts (1987)
- The Daze of Christmas (1988)
- Wild Pitch (1989)
- Up All Night (1990)
- Tonal Eclipse (1992)
- Underground (1994)
- Ninth Street (1996)
- Tastefully Done (1998)
- They Don't Even Know (2000)
- Bad for the Piano (2002)
- A Gothic Christmas (2003)
- Honestly (2004)
- Bring It Back (2006)
- Disconcert (2008)
- All In (2011)
- Refraction (2013)
- Camden Town - EP (2015)
- Perfect - single (2018)
- Too Good At Goodbyes - single (2018)
- Fall Asleep at Sunset (2018)
- Lost In Japan - single (2019)
- Back to Earth (2022)

Their entire discography can be found on RateMyMusic and Spotify. Most recently they released their album "Back to Earth" which features singles such as "Perfect," "Too Good At Goodbyes," and "Lost In Japan".
