= Ronald Ward =

Ronald or Ron Ward may refer to:

- Ronald Ward (actor) (1901–1978), British actor
- Ronald James Ward (1966–2014), American serial killer
- Ronald Ogier Ward (1886–1971), British urologist
- Ron Ward (ice hockey) (born 1944), Canadian ice hockey player
- Ron Ward (cricketer) (1905–2000), Australian cricketer
- Ron Ward (footballer) (1932–2024), English footballer
- Ron Ward (rugby union) (1915–2000), New Zealand rugby union player
- Scooter Ward (Ronald Ward Jr., born 1970), American musician

== See also ==
- Ronnie Ward (born 1974), American football linebacker
- Ron Ward's Meadow With Tadley Pastures, a site of special scientific interest, on the edge of Tadley, Hampshire, England
- Don Ward (disambiguation)
