= Lawrence Ward =

Lawrence Ward may refer to:

- Lawrence Ward (serjeant-at-arms) (born 1968), serjeant at arms of the British House of Commons
- Lawrence M. Ward, neuroscientist and psychophysicist
