= Walter Ward =

Walter Ward may refer to:

- Walter Ward (footballer) (1869–?), English professional association football player
- Walter Ward (politician) (1911–1994), American councillor in New York City
- [Walter] Bryan Ward (priest) (1906–1989), Australian Anglican Archdeacon of the Downs (Brisbane, Queensland)
- Walter Ward (singer) (1940–2006), American R&B singer and lead vocalist of The Olympics
- Walter L. Ward Jr. (born 1943), American politician in Wisconsin
