= Artemas Ward (disambiguation) =

Artemas Ward (1727–1800) was an American major general in the American Revolutionary War and a U.S. Representative from Massachusetts.

Artemas Ward may also refer to:

- Artemas Ward Jr. (1762–1847), son of Artemas Ward, also a U.S. Representative from Massachusetts
- Artemas Ward (writer) (1848–1925), great-grandson of Artemas Ward, American author and advertising executive, writer of The Grocer's Encyclopedia

== See also ==
- Artemus Ward (1834–1867), pen name of Charles Farrar Browne, American humor writer
- Statue of Artemas Ward, a 1936 statue in Ward Circle, Washington, D.C.
- SS Artemas Ward, a U.S. Liberty ship used in World War II
