= Don Ward =

Don Ward is the name of:

- Don Ward (comedian), British comedy entrepreneur and producer
- Don Ward (cricketer) (born 1934), former cricketer
- Don Ward (ice hockey) (1935–2014), Canadian ice hockey defenceman
