= Paul Joseph Ward =

British academic

Paul Ward (born 1964) was Head of the Department of English, History and Creative Writing and Professor of Public History and Community Heritage at Edge Hill University in Ormskirk, Lancashire. He was Professor of Modern British History at the University of Huddersfield until 2018. He received both his BA and PhD from Queen Mary and Westfield College. He has taught at London Guildhall University, Middlesex University, University of Westminster and Royal Holloway. In 2004, he was visiting lecturer at the University of A Coruña; in 2004–5, he was Fulbright-Robertson Professor of British History at Westminster College, Missouri. Ward is the author of four books, relating to national identities in the United Kingdom. He is best known for his work on Britishness. He is retired and now works voluntarily with Kirklees Local TV as a historical consultant.
