= Jennifer Ward (author) =

American children's picture book author (born 1963)

Jennifer Ward (born December 4, 1963) is an American children's picture book author. Many of her books focus on science, nature and the Sonoran Desert. Ward has a B.A. in education from the University of Arizona.

Her books have been translated into many languages and have received the International Reading Association's / CBC Children's Choice Award, the American Booksellers Association Book Sense Summer Pick, a Learning Magazine Teachers' Choice Award for Best Children's Picture Book, a Parents' Choice Award, a Governor's Selection for the states of New Jersey and Arizona, the Grand Canyon Reader Award, among other honors. Her book, There Was a Coyote Who Swallowed a Flea has been integrated into the architecture at the Buckeye Public Library in Buckeye, Arizona.

== Bibliography ==
- I Love Birds! 52 Ways to Wonder, Wander and Explore Birds with Kids (2019)
- Mama Dug a Little Den (2018)
- Feathers and Hair, What Animals Wear (2017)
- What Will Grow? (2017)
- There Was an Old Mummy Who Swallowed a Spider (2015)
- There Was an Old Martian Who Swallowed the Moon (2015)
- Mama Built a Little Nest (2014)
- The Sunhat (2013)
- What Will Hatch? (2013)
- There Was an Old Pirate Who Swallowed a Fish (2012)
- It's a Jungle Out There! 52 Nature Activities for City Kids (2011)
- There Was an Odd Princess Who Swallowed a Pea (2011)
- There Was an Old Monkey Who Swallowed a Frog (2010)
- Let's Go Outside! Outdoor Activities and Projects to Get You and Your Kids Closer to Nature (2009)
- The Busy Tree (2009)
- I Love Dirt! 52 Projects to Help You and Your Kids Discover the Wonders of Nature (2008)
- Way Up in the Arctic (2007)
- Because You Are My Baby (2007)
- There Was a Coyote Who Swallowed a Flea(2007)
- Forest Bright, Forest Night board book (2007)
- Forest Bright, Forest Night (2005)
- The Little Creek (2004)
- Way Out in the Desert board book (2003)
- Over in the Garden (2003)
- The Seed and the Giant Saguaro(2003)
- Somewhere in the Ocean (2000)
- Way Out in the Desert (1998)
