= Adrian Ward =

Adrian Ward may refer to:

- Adrian Ward (American football) (born 1982), cornerback for the Minnesota Vikings and the New York Giants
- Adrian Ward (artist) (born 1976), software artist and musician
