= Jeff Ward =

Jeff Ward may refer to:

- Jeff Ward (actor) (born 1986), American actor
- Jeff Ward (motorsports) (born 1961), motocross rider and racing driver
- Jeff Ward (musician) (1962–1993), drummer

== See also ==
- Geoff Ward (disambiguation)
