= Darren Ward =

Darren Ward may refer to:

- Darren Ward (footballer, born 1974), Welsh international football goalkeeper
- Darren Ward (footballer, born 1978), English football defender
- Darren Ward (swimmer) (born 1968), American-born Canadian swimmer, Olympic competitor
