= Aaron Ward =

Aaron Ward may refer to:

- Aaron Ward (baseball) (1896–1961), American baseball infielder
- Aaron Ward (ice hockey) (born 1973), retired Canadian professional ice hockey defenceman
- Aaron Ward (representative) (1790–1867), US representative from New York
- Aaron Ward (sailor) (1851–1918), admiral in the US Navy
- Aaron Montgomery Ward (1844–1913), founder of the Montgomery Ward store chain
- USS Aaron Ward, the name of three ships in the US Navy
