= Marcus Ward =

Marcus Ward may refer to:

- Marcus Ward & Co., British publishing company
- Marcus Lawrence Ward (1812–1884), American politician
- Marcus Llewellyn Ward (1875–1963), American dentistry academic
