= Tony Dornhorst =

Tony Dornhorst CBE, FRCP
- Born: Antony Clifford Dornhorst; 2 April 1915; Woodford, Essex, England
- Died: 9 March 2003 (aged 87)
- Education: St Clement Danes School
- Alma mater: St Thomas's Hospital Medical School
- Occupations: Physician; Medical researcher
- Employers: St Thomas's Hospital; St George's Hospital Medical School

Antony Clifford Dornhorst CBE, FRCP (1915–2003) was a British physician and medical educator, described as "one of the outstanding academic clinician-scientists of his generation".

Dornhorst was born on 2 April 1915 in Woodford, Essex. His father was a company director of Dutch descent; his mother was a musician.

He was educated at St Clement Danes School, but did not attend school between the ages of 12 and 14. He subsequently studied medicine at St Thomas's Hospital Medical School. At the age of 23, he became the youngest member of the Royal College of Physicians.

He was in the Royal Army Medical Corps in World War II in Palestine, north Africa, Italy, and the senior physician in Berlin with the rank of lieutenant colonel. In Berlin that he met Helen, a Royal Army Medical Corps radiologist who later became his wife.

He was appointed a reader in medicine at St Thomas's in 1949 and became a consultant there in 1951.

He held the foundation chair of medicine at St George's Hospital Medical School from 1959 to 1980.

Serving on the Himsworth committee on matters relating to Northern Ireland, he once inhaled CS gas to better understand its effects.

He was a member of the Medical Research Council from 1973 to 1977.

He was made a Commander of the Order of British Empire (CBE) in 1977 as part of the Silver Jubilee and Birthday Honours.

He died on 9 March 2003.
