= Benjamin F. Ward =

Benjamin Franklin Ward Jr.
- Born: August 2, 1948; Baltimore, Maryland, U.S.
- Died: December 14, 2013 (aged 65); Durham, North Carolina, U.S.
- Education: Morehouse College, B.A. Yale University, 1972, Ph.D.
- Known for: The Pitchforks of Duke University
- Scientific career
- Fields: Academia; Music (piano)
- Workplaces: Duke University

Benjamin F. Ward Jr. (August 2, 1948 - December 14, 2013) was an Adjunct Associate Professor in the Duke University Department of Philosophy and was the Associate Dean for Faculty Program at Duke. He was an accomplished pianist who began playing at the age of six, and a longtime choral singer and music director. He died in 2013 in Durham, NC, after battling a long illness.

== Early life ==
Ward spent most of his childhood years in Montgomery, Alabama, and Berkeley, California. He became proficient in piano as a child, and played during services at the Dexter Avenue Baptist Church in Montgomery. The pastor of the church was Martin Luther King, Jr.

He became friendly with both Dr. King and his wife, Coretta Scott King, and was often a guest in their home. After Dr. King won the Nobel Peace Prize in 1964, Mrs. King asked Ward to travel to Atlanta from California, where he was living, to play music at the celebration. Four years later, when King was assassinated, Ward served his pastor one final time: when the organist at Ebenezer Baptist Church was too distressed to play at King's funeral, Coretta Scott King asked Ward to step in. "Coretta took me aside and said, 'Ben, you have to play for Martin tomorrow.' It was like doing my filial duty," Ward said in a 2013 interview. "In the first row of the church was Mrs. King and her four children and Harry Belafonte. In the second row were the Kennedys, Nixon and Humphrey. I was only 13; I was too young to be intimidated."

== Education and Musical Career ==
Ward completed his undergraduate education at Morehouse College in Atlanta before studying for his Ph. D in philosophy at Yale. He received his degree there in 1972, and was hired as a junior faculty member and appointed the Dean of Berkeley College, one of Yale's 12 residential colleges.

While at Yale, Ward became involved in the campus's robust musical scene. He sang in the choir of Yale's Battell Chapel. He was frequently asked to collaborate with string students at the Yale School of Music; he participated in master classes with Pierre Fournier, Joseph Silverstein, Janos Starker, Donald Weilerstein, and Mstislav Rostropovich, and performed on several occasions with the legendary Yale Quartet. He also founded the Berkeley Chamber Players in Berkeley College. Through the Chamber Players, he mentored many musicians whose careers later placed them in major positions in ensembles throughout the world, including the music director of the Baltimore Symphony, members of the Boston Symphony, the Chicago Symphony, the San Francisco Symphony, the Los Angeles Philharmonic, the Berlin Philharmonic, the Vienna Philharmonic, and the Royal Concertgebouw Orchestra. He also performed as soloist with the New Haven, Atlanta, North Carolina, Tucson, Houston, and Seattle symphonies.

Ward moved from Yale to Duke in 1980, where members the newly-formed a cappella group, The Duke Pitchforks, asked him to serve as the group's faculty adviser. He quickly became a leader of the group and by the time of its official chartering in 1981, he was its official music director. Though he was older than the undergraduates who made up the bulk of the group, he served as a full member, singing in performances and holding the post of music director for four years.

Thanks to the participation of Duke graduate students who had attended Yale, the early Pitchfork repertoire included many arrangements from the Yale Songbook, including Whiffenpoofs standards like "Time After Time" and "Too Darn Hot," and even Yale's traditional school song, "Bright College Years." Ward soon began creating new arrangements for the group, including: "Georgia On My Mind" (after the King's Singers) Vince Clarke's "Only You", "A - Roving", "Clementine!", "Paper Moon", "Hurry Sundown", "Hush, Little Baby", "What Shall We Do with the Drunken Sailor", "Deck the Halls", "Short People", and "In My Room".

== Academic Career ==
Ward spoke eight languages. Besides being an associate professor of Philosophy at Duke, Ward taught courses in Arabic language, and German studies. He was Duke’s first faculty-member-in-residence and continued to nurture and expand the program over the years.

Ward was an active supporter of several varsity athletic teams at Duke, including men’s and women’s cross country, track and field and soccer. He was a passionate fan of the Durham Bulls Baseball Club, which plays close to the Duke campus, and the Wake Forest University baseball program.

Ward was a member of the Board of Visitors of the University of North Carolina School of the Arts.p

For the last 20 years of his life, Ward worked with members of the homeless community, organizing and preparing evening meals. He also mentored African-American boys in Durham.

== Illness and Death ==
Ward was diagnosed with colon cancer in 2010. "The doctors were in the middle of explaining this long list of side effects of chemotherapy," he said in an interview, "And I said, 'Time out, I can't take any more of this. What I need to do is listen to Beethoven.... It was very clear to me that I wanted my biggest choice to be deciding what music to listen to during treatments." Despite the advance of his illness, Ward continued to faithfully attend Durham Bulls games.

He died in December 2013.
