= Jason Ward (Gaelic footballer) =

Irish Gaelic footballer

Jason Ward is a former Gaelic footballer from County Dublin. Although born in Dublin, and playing for the north Dublin club St Brigid's, he played with Leitrim county team, as the first player to avail of the parent rule.

He was part of the Leitrim team that won the 1994 Connacht Senior Football Championship. At club level he was captain of the St Brigid's team that won the Dublin and Leinster titles in 2003.
