= Peter Ward =

Peter Ward may refer to:

- Peter Ward (New York politician) (1827–1891)
- Peter Ward (rugby union) (1876–1943), Australian rugby player
- Peter J. Ward (1891–1970), Irish politician
- Peter Ward (athlete) (1913–2009), English athlete who competed for Great Britain in the 1936 Summer Olympics
- Pete Ward (1937–2022), Canadian Major League Baseball player
- Peter Langdon Ward (born 1943), geophysicist
- Peter Ward (paleontologist) (born 1949), paleontologist and professor at the University of Washington, Seattle
- Peter Ward (footballer, born 1955), retired English footballer, played for Brighton & Hove Albion and Nottingham Forest
- Peter Ward (swimmer) (born 1963), Canadian swimmer
- Peter Ward (footballer, born 1964), retired English footballer, played for Huddersfield Town, Rochdale, Stockport County, Wrexham and Morecambe
- Panaiotis, aka Peter Ward, vocalist and composer
