= Don Ward (cricketer) =

Welsh cricketer

Personal information
- Full name: Donald John Ward
- Born: 30 August 1934 (age 92); Trealaw, Tonypandy, Wales
- Batting: Right-handed
- Bowling: Right-arm off-spin

Domestic team information
- Years: Team
- 1954 to 1962: Glamorgan

Career statistics
Competition	First-class
Matches	134
Runs scored	2496
Batting average	14.42
100s/50s	0/6
Top score	86
Balls bowled	10,778
Wickets	187
Bowling average	26.66
5 wickets in innings	7
10 wickets in match	0
Best bowling	7/60
Catches/stumpings	65/–
- Source: Cricinfo, 2 August 2017

Donald John Ward (born 30 August 1934) is a former cricketer who played first-class cricket for Glamorgan in the County Championship between 1954 and 1962.

An all-rounder born in Trealaw, Tonypandy, but brought up in London, Don Ward bowled right-arm off-spin that took 187 wickets and also contributed 2,496 lower-order runs including six half-centuries. Described as "a very brave and attractive strokemaker" as well as "a good off-spinner", Ward was also a skilled fielder both close to the wicket and in the outfield. He was one of the shortest players in county cricket, at around five feet three inches tall.

His career best with the bat was 86, against Somerset in 1956. With the ball he took his career-best 7 for 60 against Lancashire in 1962, when he bowled Glamorgan to a 12-run victory in the second-last match of his career. He also served in the British Armed Forces, playing for British Army and Royal Artillery teams in 1953.

After leaving Glamorgan at the end of the 1962 season he worked for a transport company in South Wales.
