= Kevin Ward =

Kevin Ward may refer to:

- Kevin Ward (audio engineer) (born 1968), American engineer, record producer, and songwriter
- Kevin Ward (baseball) (1961–2019), American baseball player
- Kevin Ward (geographer), British geographer and academic
- Kevin Ward (rugby league) (born 1957), English rugby league footballer
- Kevin Ward, Jr. (1994–2014), American sprint car racing driver
- Kevin L. Ward (born 1963), American police officer and Oklahoma Secretary of Safety and Security
