= Lyman Ward =

Lyman Ward may refer to:

- Lyman Ward (actor) (b. 1941), Canadian actor
- Lyman Ward (clergyman) (1868–1948), Universalist minister
- Lyman M. Ward (1836–1909), Civil War general
