= Robin Ward =

Robin Ward may refer to:

- Robin Ward (priest) (born 1966), former principal of St Stephen's House, Oxford
- Robin Ward (singer) (born 1941), session vocalist in the mid-20th century
- Robin Ward (television personality) (born 1944), Canadian and American television personality
