= Ryan Ward =

Ryan Ward may refer to:

- Ryan Ward (actor) (born 1979), Canadian actor
- Ryan Ward (baseball) (born 1998), professional baseball player
- Ryan Ward (gymnast) (born 1989), American acrobatic gymnast
- Ryan Ward (lacrosse) (born 1980), Canadian lacrosse player
- Ryan Henry Ward, American artist
- Ryan Zachary Ward, actor in Naomi and Ely's No Kiss List
- Ryan Ward, (born 2013), soccer player
