= Jeremy Ward (bassoonist) =

British classical bassoonist

Jeremy Ward is a British classical bassoonist specialising in performances on period instruments. He was a student of Charles Cracknell and a member of the National Youth Orchestra. He went on to study music at King's College, Cambridge. He has served as principal bassoonist with the leading period orchestras of London, performing under Sir John Eliot Gardiner, Sir Roger Norrington, Trevor Pinnock, and Christopher Hogwood.
