= Frederick Warde (cricketer) =

English cricketer

Frederick Warde (18 March 1852 – 14 May 1899) was an English first-class cricketer active 1871–77 who played for Kent. He was born in West Farleigh; died in West Malling.

== Bibliography ==
- Carlaw, Derek (2020). Kent County Cricketers, A to Z: Part One (1806–1914) (PDF). Cardiff: ACS.
