= Sarah Ward =

Sarah Ward may refer to:

- Sarah Ward (novelist), English novelist and critic
- Sarah Ward (politician) (1895–1969), Conservative UK politician
- Sarah Ward (theatre manager) (1726–1771), Scottish stage actor and theatre manager
- Sarah Ward (1735–1806), Irish actress, wife of Roger Kemble
