= Andrew Ward (author) =

American historian

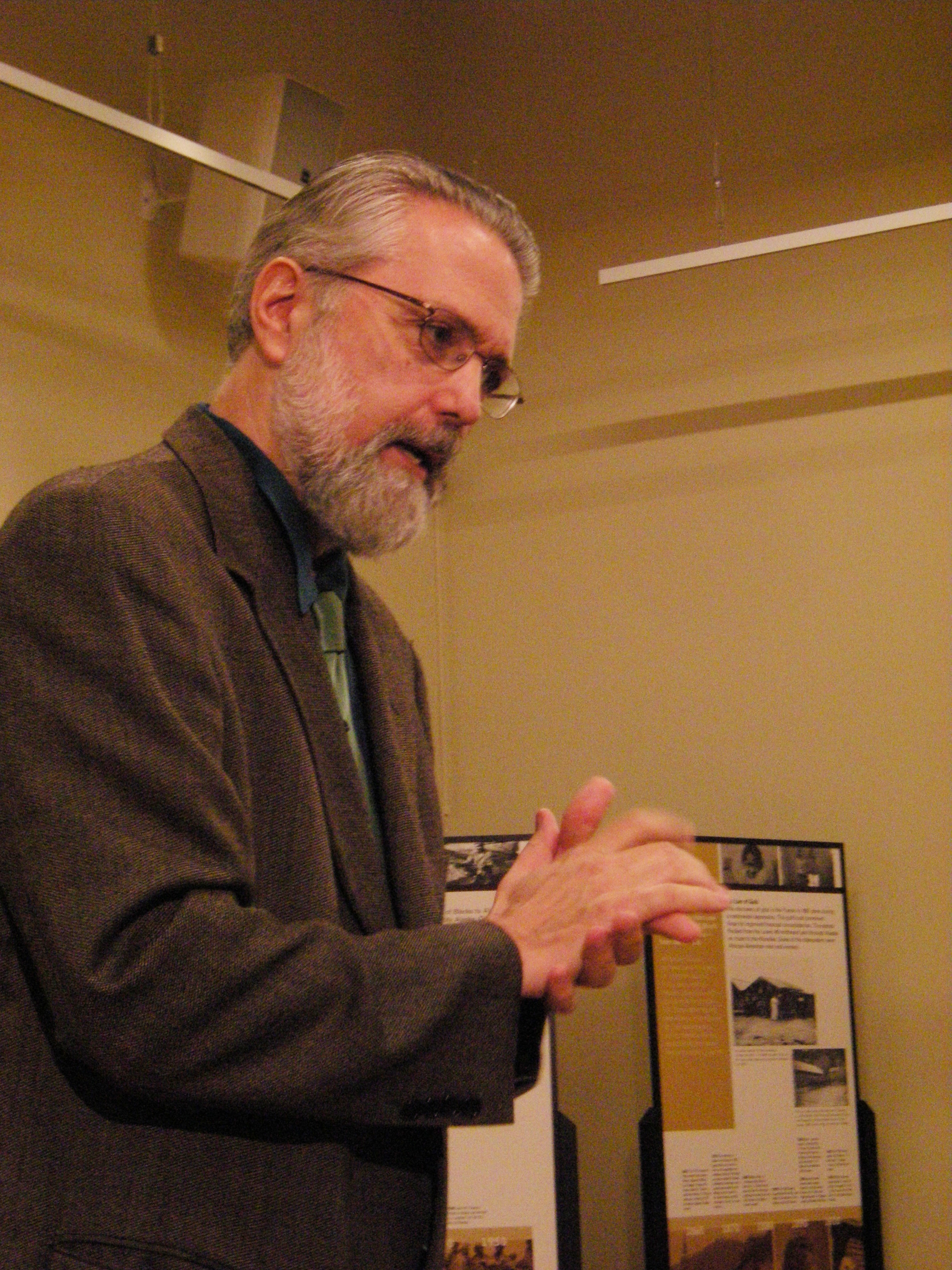
Andrew Ward at a 2008 staged reading of material from his book The Slaves' War, Northwest African American Museum, Seattle, Washington.

Andrew S. Ward (born 1946) is an American writer of historical nonfiction.

He is a former contributing editor to Atlantic Monthly, commentator for National Public Radio's All Things Considered and columnist for The Washington Post''. He lives in Seattle, Washington.

== Works ==
- Fits and Starts: The Premature Memoirs of Andrew Ward, Little-Brown (1978), ISBN 0-316-92199-8
- The Blood Seed, McGraw-Hill (1987), ISBN 0-07-068133-3
- Out Here: A Newcomer's Notes from the Great Northwest, Penguin (1992), ISBN 0-14-013054-3
- Our Bones are Scattered: The Cawnpore Massacres and The Indian Mutiny Of 1857, Henry Holt and Co. (1996), ISBN 0-8050-2437-9
- Dark Midnight When I Rise: The Story of the Jubilee Singers, Amistad (2001), ISBN 0-06-093482-4
- River Run Red: The Fort Pillow Massacre in the American Civil War, Penguin (2006), ISBN 0-14-303786-2
- The Slaves' War: The Civil War in the Words of Former Slaves, Houghton Mifflin (2008), ISBN 0-618-63400-2
