= Joel Ward =

Joel Ward may refer to:

- Joel Ward (footballer) (born 1989), English footballer
- Joel Ward (ice hockey) (born 1980), ice hockey player
- Joel Ward (magician) (born 1983), magician
- Joel N. Ward (born 1959), foreign currency trader

== See also ==
- Joe Ward (disambiguation)
