= Senator Warder =

Senator Warder may refer to:

- Frederick L. Warder (1912–1980), New York State Senate
- Walter Warder (1851–1938), Illinois State Senate
