= Geoffrey Ward (rugby league) =

English rugby league footballer

Personal information
- Full name: Geoffrey G. Ward

Playing information
- Position: Centre
Club
Years	Team	Pld	T	G	FG	P
1956–66	Castleford	236	61	1	0	185
Representative
Years	Team	Pld	T	G	FG	P
1964	Yorkshire	1	0	0	0	0

Geoffrey G. Ward is a former professional rugby league footballer who played in the 1950s and 1960s. He played at representative level for Yorkshire, and at club level for Castleford, as a centre.

== Playing career ==
Ward won a cap for Yorkshire while at Castleford, playing at centre in the 33-10 victory over Lancashire at Hull FC's stadium on 23 September 1964.
