= David Ward (American football end) =

American football player (1907–1982)

Profile
- Position: End

Personal information
- Born: March 10, 1907; Wynnewood, Oklahoma, U.S.
- Died: March 1982

Career information
- College: New Mexico; Haskell Indian Nations

Career history
- 1933: Boston Redskins

David Ward (March 10, 1907 – March 1982) was an American football end in the National Football League (NFL) for the Boston Redskins. Born in Wynnewood, Oklahoma, Ward attended Haskell Indian Nations University and the University of New Mexico.
