= Albert Ward (cricketer, born 1896) =

English cricketer

Personal information
- Full name: Albert Paine Ward
- Born: 9 November 1896; Highgate, Middlesex, England
- Died: 5 March 1979 (aged 82); Jersey
- Batting: Right-handed
- Bowling: Right-arm fast

Domestic team information
- Years: Team
- 1921: Hampshire

Career statistics
Competition	First-class
Matches	1
Runs scored	11
Batting average	11.00
100s/50s	–/–
Top score	6
Balls bowled	72
Wickets	1
Bowling average	57.00
5 wickets in innings	–
10 wickets in match	–
Best bowling	1/28
Catches/stumpings	1/–
- Source: Cricinfo, 9 January 2010

Albert Paine Ward (9 November 1896 — 5 March 1979) was an English first-class cricketer and airman.

Ward was born in Highgate in November 1896. He served in the Royal Flying Corps and its successor, the Royal Air Force, as an enlisted rank during the First World War. Following the war, Ward played first-class cricket for Hampshire, making a single appearance at Southampton against Lancashire in the 1921 County Championship. Playing in the Hampshire side as a right-arm fast bowler, he took a single wicket during the match, that of Charles Hallows, to take match figures of 1 for 57. Batting at number eleven, he was dismissed for 6 runs in Hampshire's first innings by Harry Dean, while in their second innings he was unbeaten on 5 runs. Ward died in Jersey on 5 March 1979.
