= List of Dayton Flyers in the NFL draft =

This is a list of Dayton Flyers football players in the NFL draft.

== Key ==
B	Back	K	Kicker	NT	Nose tackle
C	Center	LB	Linebacker	FB	Fullback
DB	Defensive back	P	Punter	HB	Halfback
DE	Defensive end	QB	Quarterback	WR	Wide receiver
DT	Defensive tackle	RB	Running back	G	Guard
E	End	T	Offensive tackle	TE	Tight end

== Selections ==
Year	Round	Pick	Overall	Player	Team	Position
1939	17	7	157	Ralph Neihaus	Detroit Lions	T
1940	16	6	146	Jack Padley	Detroit Lions	B
1946	24	5	225	Neil Scully	New York Giants	B
1949	14	2	133	Ed Toscani	Boston Yanks	B
1950	7	1	80	Art Bok	Baltimore Colts	B
1950	17	9	218	Ray Janaszek	Chicago Bears	B
1950	24	3	303	Don Delph	Green Bay Packers	B
1950	25	10	323	Bob Dunn	San Francisco 49ers	G
1950	30	11	389	Bill Lange	Los Angeles Rams	G
1951	17	12	207	Leroy Ka-Ne	Cleveland Browns	B
1953	16	1	182	Jim Currin	Baltimore Colts	E
1953	20	10	239	Chuck Noll	Cleveland Browns	LB
1953	25	11	300	Ed Clemens	Los Angeles Rams	C
1955	20	6	235	Jack Muldowney	Los Angeles Rams	T
1956	4	8	45	Jim Katcavage	New York Giants	DE
1956	13	10	155	Jerry Ward	Washington Redskins	G
1956	25	5	294	Johnny Grogan	Philadelphia Eagles	T
1957	7	7	80	Fred Dugan	San Francisco 49ers	E
1957	16	7	188	Vic Kristopalitis	San Francisco 49ers	B
1958	11	12	133	Claude Chaney	Detroit Lions	B
1959	3	4	28	Emil Karas	Washington Redskins	T
1959	12	6	138	Bill Korutz	San Francisco 49ers	C
1960	14	1	157	Bob DeMarco	St. Louis Cardinals	T
1964	9	12	124	Mickey Bitsko	New York Giants	LB
1965	7	7	91	Erwin Will	Philadelphia Eagles	T
1965	18	1	239	Mike Ciccolella	New York Giants	LB
1967	4	27	107	Tom Stangle	New Orleans Saints	T
1967	12	1	291	Bob Shortal	New York Giants	LB
1968	7	8	173	Pete Richardson	Buffalo Bills	DB
1968	15	18	399	Dan Kramarczyk	San Diego Chargers	T
1969	10	14	248	Lou Galiardi	New York Giants	DT
1969	14	5	343	Mike Wilson	Cincinnati Bengals	RB
1970	12	9	295	Bill Tant	San Francisco 49ers	T
1970	14	17	355	Tony Moro	Washington Redskins	RB
1971	11	18	278	Marshall Ellison	New York Giants	G
1971	17	14	430	Leo Dillon	Cleveland Browns	C
1972	3	25	77	Gary Kosins	Miami Dolphins	RB
1972	9	7	215	Gary Hamvell	Baltimore Colts	DT
1973	16	18	408	Larry Nickels	Detroit Lions	WR
1975	17	18	434	Jim Testerman	Dallas Cowboys	TE
1976	17	28	487	Kelvin Kirk	Pittsburgh Steelers	WR
1977	11	2	281	Bill Westbeld	Seattle Seahawks	T
2020	3	41	105	Adam Trautman	New Orleans Saints	TE
