= Frederick Ward (cricketer) =

English cricketer

Frederick Ward (31 August 1881 – 28 February 1948) was an English first-class cricketer, who played one match for Yorkshire County Cricket Club against the Marylebone Cricket Club (MCC) in 1903. He also played for the Yorkshire Second XI (1903), Northallerton and District (1903) and Yorkshire Cricket Council (1903–1912).

Born in Heckmondwike, Yorkshire, England, Ward was a slow left arm orthodox spin bowler, who bowled twelve overs for 16 runs without taking a wicket. He scored a duck in his only first-class innings. There was no play on the first two days of the match, and the game was moved from the main ground at Lord's to the nursery ground on the third day, to allow a day's play to take place. The match ended in a draw.

Ward died in February 1948 in Dewsbury, Yorkshire.
