= Tony Ward (footballer) =

English footballer

Personal information
- Full name: Anthony Ward
- Date of birth: 4 April 1970 (age 56)
- Place of birth: Warrington, England
- Position: Midfielder

Youth career
- 1987–1988: Everton

Senior career*
Years	Team	Apps	(Gls)
1988–1989	Everton	0	(0)
1988–1989	→ Doncaster Rovers (loan)	4	(0)
1989–1990	Wigan Athletic	11	(2)
1991–1992	Chorley		
1992–1996	Marine		(9)
1996–1997	Chorley		
1997–2001	Runcorn		(7)
- * Club domestic league appearances and goals

Anthony Ward (born 4 April 1970) is an English former professional footballer who played in the Football League as a midfielder. Ward started his career as a youth player at Everton before signing on loan for Doncaster Rovers in 1988 where he made his Football League debut. He made 4 league appearances for Doncaster Rovers and 1 in the FA Cup before signing for Wigan Athletic the following season.
