= Gary Ward =

Gary Ward may refer to:

- Gary Ward (baseball coach) (born 1940), college baseball coach
- Gary Ward (outfielder) (born 1953), Major League Baseball outfielder and right-handed batter
- Gary Ward (soccer), for Melbourne Knights FC

== See also ==
- Gareth Ward, Australian politician
