= Adam Ward (baseball) =

American baseball coach and catcher (born 1986)

Biographical details
- Born: January 12, 1986 (age 39); Hanahan, South Carolina, U.S.

Playing career
- 2006–2009: Clemson
- Position(s): Catcher

Coaching career (HC unless noted)
- 2010–2011: Liberty (assistant)
- 2012–2016: Charleston Southern (assistant)
- 2017–2019: Charleston Southern

Head coaching record
- Overall: 64–100
- Tournaments: 1–4 (Big South)

Adam Ward (born January 12, 1986) is an American baseball coach and former catcher. He played college baseball for Clemson for coach Jack Leggett from 2006 to 2009. He then served as the head coach of the Charleston Southern Buccaneers (2017–2019).

== Playing career ==
Ward attended Hanahan High School in Hanahan, South Carolina. Ward played for the school's varsity baseball team. Ward then enrolled at the Clemson University, to play college baseball for the Clemson Tigers baseball team.

As a freshman at Clemson University in 2006, Ward didn't appear in a single game.

As a sophomore in 2007, Ward had a .000 batting average, a 1.000 on-base percentage (OBP) appearing in 3 games and having just a single plate appearance.

In the 2008 season as a junior, Ward hit .375 while making one start and driving in 1 run.

As a senior in 2009, Ward had a .167 batting average, a .375 on OBP and appeared in 6 games.

== Coaching career ==
Once Ward was out of college, he accepted the volunteer assistant coach for the Liberty baseball team. Ward spent two seasons at Liberty, helping the team to a school record 43 wins in 2010.

In 2011, Ward was hired as an assistant for Stuart Lake's staff on the Charleston Southern Buccaneers baseball team.

On January 26, 2017, Ward was named the interim head coach of the Buccaneers. After a 22–29 season, Charleston Southern named Ward their permanent head coach on May 11, 2017. On December 31, 2019, Ward stepped down as the head coach of the Buccaneers after compiling a record of 64–100 in three seasons.

== Head coaching record ==
Statistics overview
Season	Team	Overall	Conference	Standing	Postseason
Charleston Southern (Big South Conference) (2017–2019)
2017	Charleston Southern	22–29	9–15	9th	
2018	Charleston Southern	19–35	10–17	7th	Big South Tournament
2019	Charleston Southern	23–36	11–16	7th	Big South Tournament
Charleston Southern:		64–100	30–48		
Total:		64–100			
