= Joseph Ward (disambiguation) =

Joseph Ward (1856–1930) was a prime minister of New Zealand.

Joseph Ward may also refer to:

- Joseph Ward (1838–1889), South Dakota politician
  - Joseph Ward (Beghé), a 1963 marble sculpture
- Joseph Ward (astronomer) (1862–1927), New Zealand farmworker, bookseller and astronomer
- Joseph Ward (fencer) (1909–1970), New Zealand fencer and fencing administrator
- Joseph Ward (Marlborough politician) (1817–1892), New Zealand politician
- Joseph Ward (tenor) (1932–2019), English tenor (formerly baritone)
- Joseph Ward (VC) (1832–1872), Victoria Cross recipient
- Joseph D. Ward (1914–2003), Massachusetts politician
- Joseph P. Ward, American historian and author
- Joseph S. Ward (1925–1994), American civil engineer
- Joseph Taylor Ward, American professional baseball player

== See also ==
- Joe Ward (disambiguation)
