= Chris Ward =

Chris Ward may refer to:

== Sports ==
- Chris Ward (offensive lineman) (born 1955), former NFL player
- Chris Ward (defensive lineman) (born 1974), former NFL player
- Chris Ward (baseball) (born 1949), American baseball player
- Chris Ward (bowls) (born 1941), England lawn bowler
- Chris Ward (chess player) (born 1968), English chess grandmaster
- Chris Ward (footballer) (born 1981), former Lincoln City player

== Other people ==
- Chris Ward (California politician) (born 1976), former member of the San Diego City Council and member of the California Assembly
- Chris Ward (Canadian politician) (born 1949), former politician in Ontario, Canada
- Chris Ward (playwright) (born 1958), English/Canadian playwright
- Chris Ward (sailor), New Zealand sailor
- Chris Ward (singer) (born 1960), American country music artist
- Chris Ward (sound editor) (born 1970)
- Chris Ward (surfer) (born 1978), American surfer
- Chris Ward (British politician), British MP
- Chris Ward, American rapper and television performer, better known as MC Chris

== See also ==
- Kris Ward, American soccer coach
- Christopher Ward (disambiguation)
