= Eric Ward (Australian footballer) =

Australian rules footballer, born 1913

Personal information
- Born: 4 July 1913
- Died: 12 August 2010 (aged 97)
- Original team: Malvern / Murrumbeena

Playing career
Years	Club	Games (Goals)
1942	St Kilda	1 (2)

Eric Ward (4 July 1913 – 12 August 2010) was an Australian rules footballer for the St Kilda Football Club. He was recruited from Malvern and Murrumbeena. His son, Geoff, also played in the VFL.
