= Paul John Ward =

British racing car driver (born 1964)

Paul Ward
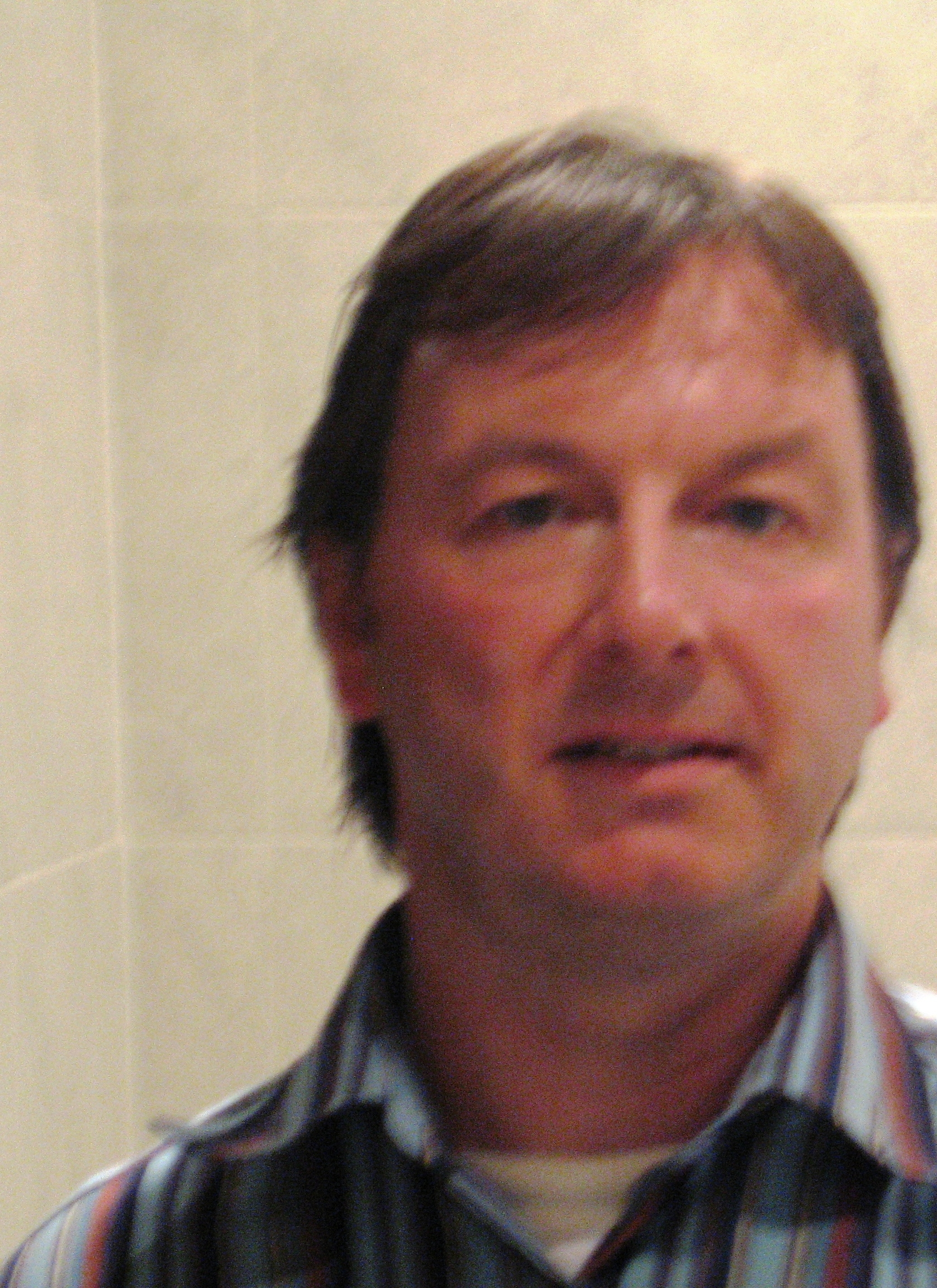
- Paul John Ward
- Nationality: (United Kingdom) British
- Born: 7 May 1964 (age 62) Oxford (England)

Porsche Club Championship GB career
- Debut season: 2011
- Current team: Team Viva Veloce
- Car number: 91
- Starts: 40
- Wins: 0
- Poles: 0
- Fastest laps: 0

Paul John Ward (born 7 May 1964 in Oxford, Oxfordshire) is a British racing car driver. He made his debut in the Porsche Club Championship in 2011 racing a Porsche 968 Clubsport. He has held a Race National Licence since 2012.

Ward is the Race Register secretary for the Porsche Club Great Britain (PCGB) and is the Managing Director of the used Porsche specialist retailer RennSport Collection.

== Personal life ==
Ward is a Chartered Engineer, a Fellow of the Institution of Mechanical Engineers and a member of the Institution of Engineering and Technology.

On Tuesday, 26 July 2011, Ward was instrumental in saving the life of a 43-year-old man suffering a cardiac arrest at the wheel of his van in Leeds, West Yorkshire.

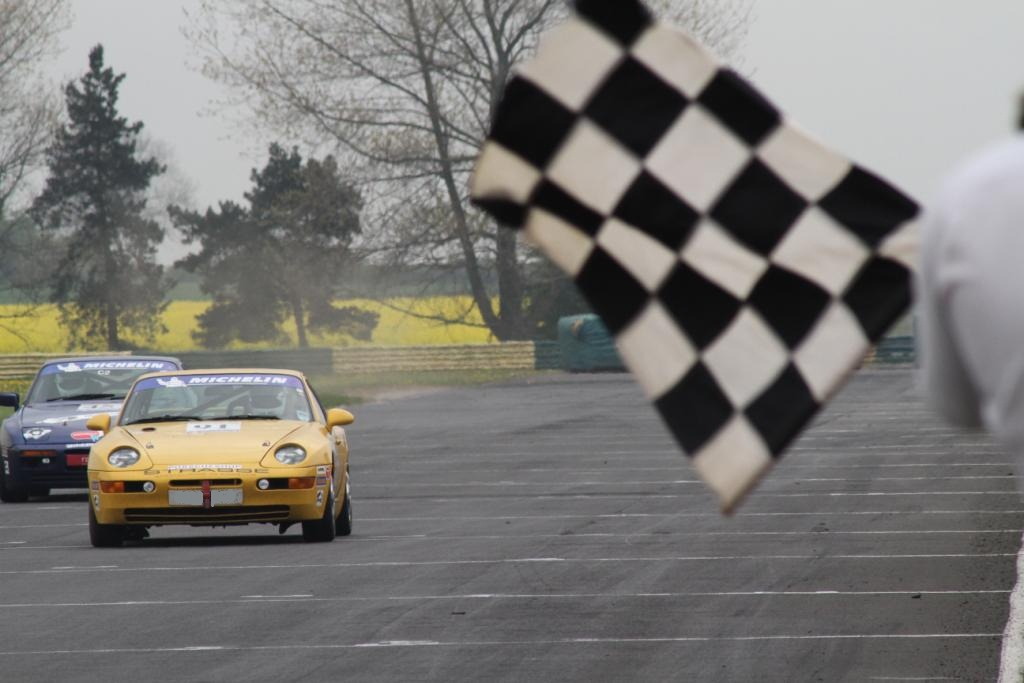
Ward driving the Porsche 968 at Croft Circuit 2011
