= Jeremy Ward =

Jeremy Ward may refer to:

- Jeremy Ward (bassoonist), British classical bassoonist
- Jeremy Ward (musician) (1976–2003), sound technician and vocal operator for The Mars Volta and for the dub outfit De Facto
- Jeremy Ward (rugby union) (born 1996), South African rugby union player

== See also ==
- Jerry Ward (disambiguation)
