= Daniel Ward =

Daniel Ward may refer to:

- Daniel Ward (boxer) (born 1963), South African boxer of the 1980s, 1990s and 2000s
- Daniel Ward (footballer) (born 1977), former Australian rules footballer with Melbourne Football Club
- Daniel P. Ward (1918–1995), American jurist
- Danny Ward (rugby league) (born 1980), English rugby league coach and former player
- Danny Ward (English footballer) (born 1990), English football forward and winger
- Danny Ward (Welsh footballer) (born 1993), Welsh football goalkeeper

== See also ==
- Dan Ward-Smith (born 1978), rugby player
- Daniel W. Connolly, American politician
