= Alan Ward =

Alan Ward may refer to:

- Sir Alan Ward (judge) (born 1938), former judge of the Court of Appeal of England and Wales
- Alan Ward (cricketer) (1947–2026), English cricketer
- Alan Ward (historian) (1935–2014), New Zealand historian
- Alan Howard Ward (1925–2021), British physicist
- Alan Ward, lead singer and songwriter of the band Elton Motello
