= Agnes S. Ward =

American nurse

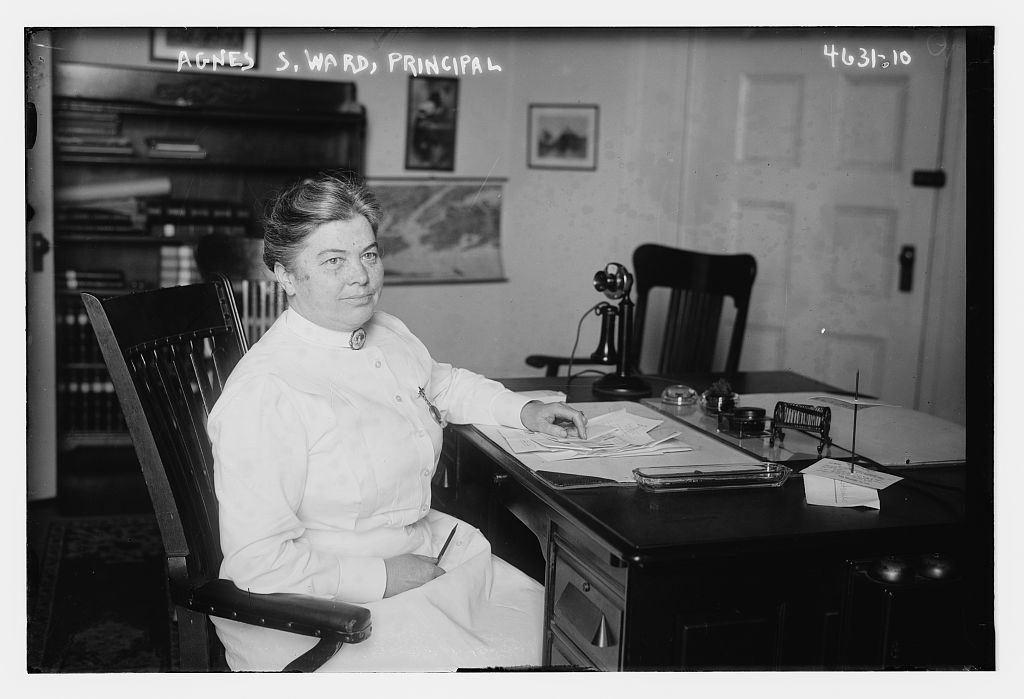
- Agnes S. Ward, from a 1918 publication
- Born: February 22, 1868; Scotland
- Died: November 29, 1938 (age 70); New York, New York, U.S.
- Occupations: Nurse; nursing educator; medical missionary

Agnes S. Ward (February 22, 1868 – November 29, 1938) was a Scottish-born American nurse, medical missionary in Africa, and nursing educator. She was principal of the Metropolitan Hospital Training School for Nurses in New York City, and superintendent of nurses for the New York City Department of Welfare.

== Early life and education ==
Ward was born in Scotland, and moved to the United States in 1885. She graduated from the Metropolitan Hospital Training School for Nurses in 1895, with further training at Brookline Hospital.

== Career ==
After her nurses' training, Ward went to the Congo Free State, where she served for three years as a medical missionary and teacher. She was principal of the Metropolitan Hospital Training School for Nurses on Blackwell's Island from 1908 to 1920. From 1920 to 1926, she was superintendent of nurses for the city's Department of Welfare. She spoke at high schools and churches to recruit nursing students into the city's training programs, and to promote nursing as a career with wide opportunities. She oversaw a training course for graduate nurses working on tuberculosis wards at Seaview Hospital on Staten Island in 1923.

She was vice-president of the New York State Nurses' Association, and president of the Metropolitan Hospital Training School's alumnae association.

== Publications ==
Ward wrote essays for professional journals, including American Journal of Nursing, The Trained Nurse and Hospital Review, and Nursing World.

- "Suggestions for What is Required in Building a Nurses' Home" (1910)
- "Nursing in Mission Stations: Some Nursing Problems in Africa" (1914)
- "The Training of Attendants" (1920)
- "What We Owe to the Student Nurse" (1920)
- "The Continent of Africa: Its Vastness, Resources, and People" (1921)
- "Has the Time Come to Abolish the Probationary Period" (1921)
- "African Religious Beliefs and their Social Effects" (1921)
- "The African Woman" (1921)
- "The African Man: A Study in Primitive Sociology" (1922)
- "The African Man, II: A Study of Primitive Emotions" (1922)
- "Training Schools for Attendants: The Problem of the Special Hospital" (1922)

== Personal life ==
Ward became a naturalized United States citizen in 1903. She retired in 1926, and she died in 1938, at the age of 70, in New York City.
