= Patrick Ward =

Patrick or Pat Ward may refer to:

- Patrick Ward (actor) (1950–2019), Australian actor
- Patrick Ward (photographer) (born 1937), British photographer
- Pat Ward (footballer) (1926–2003), Scottish footballer
- Pat Ward (rugby union) (1899–1958), New Zealand international rugby union player
- Pat Ward (racing driver) (born 1957), American racing driver
- Pat Ward (politician) (Petricia S. Ward, 1957–2012), Iowa state senator
- Pat Ward (tennis) (Patricia Ward, 1929–1985), British tennis player
- Patrick Ward (field hockey) (born 2003), New Zealand field hockey player
