= Bernard Ward =

Bernard Ward may refer to:

- Bernard Ward, 1st Viscount Bangor (1719–1781), Irish MP for Down, Bangor and Killyleagh
- Bernard Ward (bishop) (1857–1920), English Roman Catholic writer
- Bernard Ward (sailor) (1918–?), Bermudian Olympic sailor
- Bernard Evans Ward (1857–1933), British painter
- Bernard J. Ward (1925–1982), American legal educator and authority on the federal courts
- Bernard Joseph Ward (1879–1950), British urologist
- Bernard Mordaunt Ward (1893–1945), British soldier and biographer
- Bernie Ward (born 1951), American radio personality
