= Sam Ward (footballer, born 1880) =

English footballer

Personal information
- Full name: Samuel James Ward
- Date of birth: 21 March 1880
- Place of birth: Heath Town, England
- Date of death: 1968 (aged 87–88)
- Position: Full back

Senior career*
| Years | Team | Apps | (Gls) |
| 1905–1906 | Springfield | | |
| 1906–1910 | Wolverhampton Wanderers | 45 | (1) |
| 1910–1911 | Wednesbury Old Athletic | | |
| 1911–1912 | Dudley Town | | |
| 1912–1913 | Brierley Hill Alliance | | |
| 1913 | Worcester City | | |
| Total | | 45 | (1) |
- * Club domestic league appearances and goals

Samuel James Ward (21 March 1880 – 1968) was an English footballer who played in the Football League for Wolverhampton Wanderers.
