= Barry Ward =

Barry Ward may refer to:

- Barry Ward (actor), Irish actor
- Barry Ward (cricketer) (born 1961), New Zealand cricketer
- Barry Ward (politician), Irish Fine Gael senator
- Barry Ward (rugby league) (born 1971), rugby league footballer
