= Alice Ward =

Alice Ward may refer to:

- Alice Ward, a character in the 2010 American film The Fighter
- Alice Ward, a character in the British television series Utopia

== See also ==
- Alice M. Ward Library, Vermont, U.S.
- Mary Alice Ward (1896–1972), Australian teacher and pastoralist
