= Charles Caleb Ward =

Canadian painter

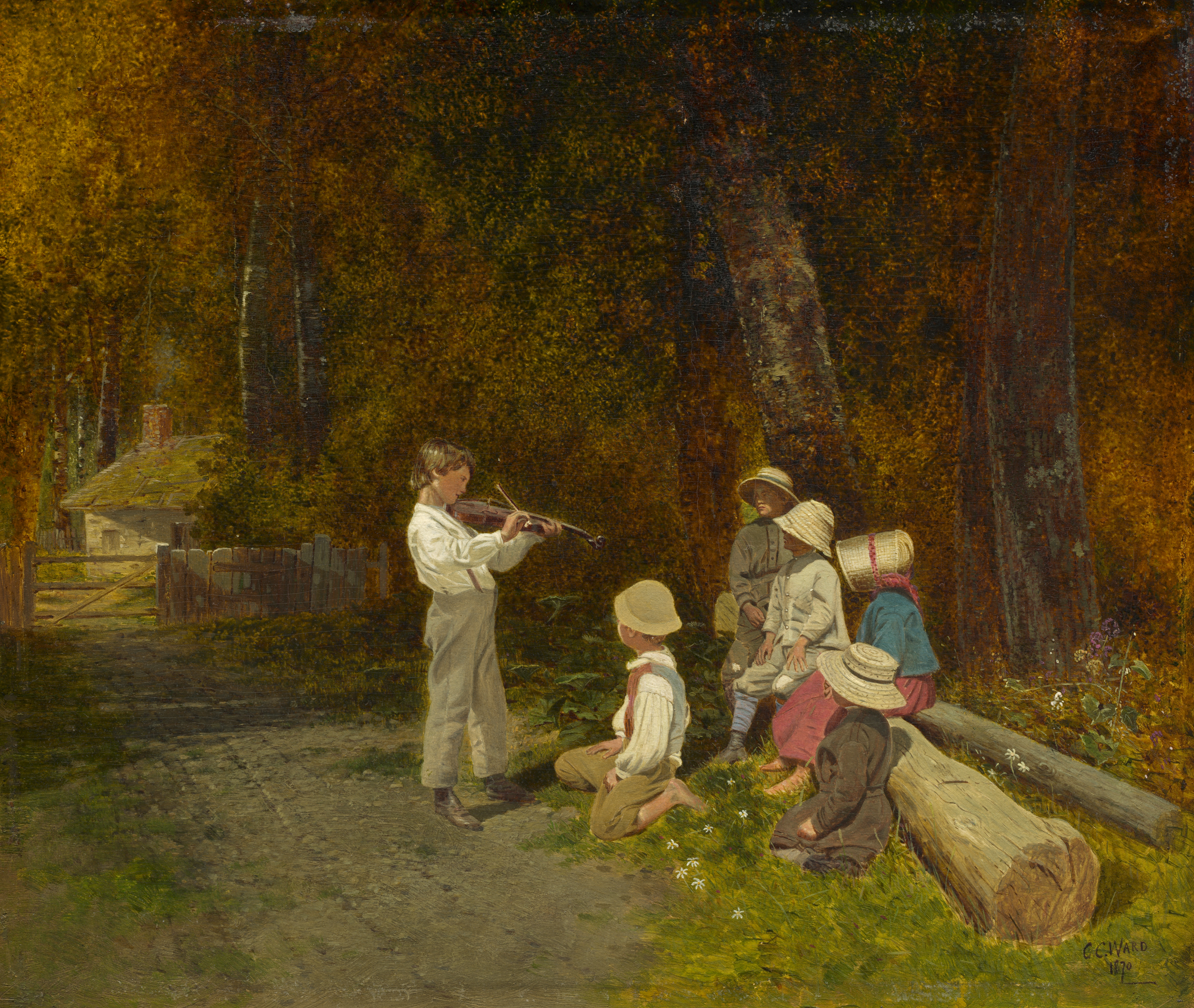
His First Appearance in Public, 1870, National Gallery of Art

Charles Caleb Ward (1831–1896) was a nineteenth-century Canadian painter. Born in Saint John, New Brunswick, his loyalist grandfather had arrived from Poughkeepsie, New York, and had established the merchant firm of John Ward and Sons. While he was in Liverpool, England, to learn about the shipping business, Charles Caleb Ward spent time figure painting with the English artist William Henry Hunt. He lived and worked in St. George and later in Rothesay, New Brunswick. For a time he also lived in New York where he studied landscape painting with Asher B. Durand; he maintained a studio in New York from 1868 to 1872. His work "The Circus Is Coming" has been described as "evasively tantalizing to modern eyes in that it suggests a sensitive feeling for a spare rectangular sort of design wedded to an Eakins-like intensity of observation." Several of his paintings are displayed at the New Brunswick Museum in Saint John.
