= Thomas Ward =

Thomas, Tom or Tommy Ward may refer to:

== Politicians ==
- Thomas Ward (diplomat), British minister to Russia, 1730–1731
- Thomas Ward (New Jersey politician) (1759–1842), U.S. congressman from New Jersey
- Thomas Ward, Baron Ward (1810–1859), English jockey and finance minister in Italy
- Thomas B. Ward (1835–1892), U.S. congressman from Indiana
- Thomas H. Ward (1867–1951), American politician
- Thomas W. Ward (1807–1872), Irish-born mayor of Austin, Texas
- Thomas Ward (MP) (1499-1563), Member of Parliament (MP) for Derby

== Sports ==
- Thomas Ward (cricketer) (1905–1989), Irish cricketer
- Thomas Ward (rugby union) (1874–1942), Australian rugby union player
- Thomas Ward (wrestler) (1907–1986), Scottish freestyle sport wrestler
- Thomas Patrick Ward (born 1994), British boxer
- Tommy Ward (cricketer) (1887–1936), South African cricketer
- Tommy Ward (footballer, born 1913) (1913–1997), English football wing-half/forward, played for Port Vale and others in the 1930s
- Tommy Ward (footballer, born 1917) (1917–1992), English football forward, played for Sheffield Wednesday and Darlington in the 1940s/1950s
- Tom Ward (curler), Canadian curler and coach
- Pinky Ward (Thomas Ward), Negro leagues baseball player

== Writers ==
- Thomas Ward (author) (1652–1708), English author who converted to Catholicism
- Thomas Humphry Ward (1845–1926), English author

== Others ==
- Thomas Ward (actor), Australian actor and writer
- Thomas Ward (mathematician) (born 1963), British mathematician
- Thomas Marcus Decatur Ward (1823–1894), African American preacher, church leader, and abolitionist
- Thomas J. Ward (1837–1924), American Civil War soldier
- Thomas Lee Ward (1936–1995), executed American murderer
- Thomas William Ward (industrialist) (1853–1926), shipbreaker from Sheffield, England
- Thomas Ward (priest) (1659–1696), Anglican priest
- Thomas Ward (fictional character), a character from the Spook's series by Joseph Delaney
- Tom Ward (born 1971), British actor
- Tom L. Ward, American businessman in Oklahoma City
- Tommy Ward (singer) (born 1995), American singer and musician
- T. John Ward (born 1943), United States federal judge

== See also ==
- Thos. W. Ward Ltd, a shipbreaking company
