= Andrew Ward (cricketer) =

English cricketer (born 1981)

Andrew Ward (born 23 June 1981, in Dartford) is a former English cricketer. He was a right-handed batsman and wicket-keeper who played for Buckinghamshire.

Ward made a single List A appearance for the team, during the 2003 season, against Dorset. Ward did not bat or bowl in the match.
