= Joe Ward =

Joe Ward may refer to:

- Joe Ward (baseball) (1884–1934), American baseball player
- Joe Ward (basketball) (born 1963), American basketball player
- Joe Ward (boxer) (born 1993), Irish boxer
- Joe Ward (footballer, born 1954), Scottish footballer
- Joe Ward (footballer, born 1995), English footballer
- Joe Ward (ice hockey) (born 1961), Canadian ice hockey player
- Joe Ward (rugby union) (born 1980), New Zealand rugby player

== See also ==
- Joanne Ward, British tennis player
- Joseph Ward (disambiguation)
- Joel Ward (disambiguation)
