= Matthew Ward =

Matthew or Matt Ward may refer to:

- Matthew Ward (singer) (born 1958), Christian music singer
- Matthew Ward (writer) (1951–1990), American English/French translator
- Matt Ward (game designer), British author and miniature wargaming designer
- Matt Ward (lacrosse) (born 1983), American lacrosse player
- Matt Ward (record producer), UK based songwriter, record producer and remixer
- Matt Ward (footballer) (born 2003), English footballer
- M. Ward (born 1973), American indie folk singer-songwriter

== See also ==
- Edward Matthew Ward (1816–1879), painter
