= Christopher Ward =

Christopher Ward may refer to:

- Christopher Ward (British politician) (born 1942), British solicitor and Conservative Party politician
- Christopher Ward (conductor) (born 1980), British conductor
- Christopher Ward (entomologist) (1836–1900), English entomologist
- Christopher Ward (journalist) (born 1942), former editor of the British newspaper Daily Express and Daily Mirror columnist
- Christopher Ward (songwriter) (born 1949), Canadian songwriter and broadcaster
- Christopher Ward (watchmaker), British company established 2004, watchmaker
- Christopher Brendan Ward (born 1975), American rapper and voice actor, better known as MC Chris
- Christopher J. Ward, American politician, early 21st century treasurer of the National Republican Congressional Committee
- Christopher Joseph Ward (born 1965), known as C. J. Ramone, American musician, bassist for punk rock group The Ramones
- Christopher O. Ward (born 1955), Executive Director of the Port Authority of New York and New Jersey
- Chris Ward (chess player) (Christopher G. Ward, born 1968), British chess Grandmaster

== See also ==
- Chris Ward (disambiguation)
