= Geoff Ward (footballer) =

Australian rules footballer

Personal information
- Full name: Geoff Ward
- Born: 8 April 1946
- Original team: Caulfield Grammarians
- Height: 185 cm (6 ft 1 in)
- Weight: 84 kg (185 lb)

Playing career^{1}
Years	Club	Games (Goals)
1968–1971	St Kilda	31 (18)
- ^{1} Playing statistics correct to the end of 1971.

Geoff Ward (born 8 April 1946) is a former Australian rules footballer who played with St Kilda in the Victorian Football League (VFL). His father, Eric Ward, also played in the VFL.
