= Margaret Ward (disambiguation) =

Margaret Ward (c. 1550–1588) was a saint.

Margaret Ward may refer to:

- Margaret Ward (journalist), Irish journalist
- Margaret E. Ward, Irish chief executive
- Maggie Ward, editor of What the Stuarts Did for Us
- Peggy Ward, Countess Munster, see Sibyl, Lady Colefax
- Margaret Ward (actor) in Flying the Flag
- Margaret Ward (golfer), competed against Betsy King

== Characters ==
- Maggie Ward, character in The Search for Maggie Ward
- Maggie Ward, character in Class Action (film)
- Peggy Ward, character in Im Banne des Unheimlichen

== See also ==
- St Margaret Ward Catholic Academy
