= B. J. Ward (American football) =

American football player (born 1981)

No. 46, 28
- Position: Safety

Personal information
- Born: November 4, 1981 (age 45); Dallas, Texas, U.S.
- Listed height: 6 ft 3 in (1.91 m)
- Listed weight: 210 lb (95 kg)

Career information
- High school: Justin F. Kimball (Dallas)
- College: Florida State
- NFL draft: 2005: undrafted

Career history
- Baltimore Ravens (2005–2006); Oakland Raiders (2007); Las Vegas Locomotives (2009)*
- * Offseason or practice squad member only

Career NFL statistics
- Tackles: 16
- Stats at Pro Football Reference

Brandon Jeffrey Ward (born November 4, 1981) is an American former professional football player who was a safety in the National Football League (NFL). He played college football for the Florida State Seminoles and was signed by the Baltimore Ravens as an undrafted free agent in 2005.

Ward has also played for the Oakland Raiders and Las Vegas Locomotives.

== Professional career ==
=== Las Vegas Locomotives ===
Ward was signed by the Las Vegas Locomotives of the United Football League on August 31, 2009.
