= The Weasels =

American rock band

The Weasels are an American rock band based in Albany, New York and active since the mid-1980s. Throughout their history, the group's core writers and performers have been Doctor Fun (vocals, saxophones, keyboards, flute, lyrics and songwriting) and Roy Weäsell (electric and acoustic guitars, vocals, keyboards, trombone, roto-vibe, mandolin, lyrics and songwriting). The Weasels have released seven LPs and one EP of original material, along with an early career retrospective compilation, and have played approximately 40 concerts, though they have not performed live since October 2000. They have been compared in reviews to Frank Zappa’s Mothers of Invention and Steely Dan, based on their melodic jazz and blues based music, elaborate arrangements, deployment of highly regarded session players, open-ended and suspended compositional style, exacting recording standards, and intelligent use of sardonic, sarcastic, historic, political, surrealist and scatological themes in their lyrics.

== Early history ==
The group was founded after Fun responded to a newspaper advertisement placed by Weäsell and producer-engineer-performer Chris Graf, who were attempting to find a keyboard and saxophone player for a planned live band. For the first several years of their existence, however, the founding trio remained home-bound, writing and recording tracks that would later appear on the discs Meat the Weasels Volume I: Fondue Cabaret and GenerationXcrement. In 1992, The Weasels submitted a tape to the local alternative newsweekly's annual unsigned artists' showcase concert, and were selected as one of four finalists, despite the fact that no live version of the band existed. Fun, Graf and Weäsell quickly assembled and rehearsed a stage presentation of their material, and won generally positive audience and critical reviews for their performance, despite losing the contest to a defunct industrial metal band.

== Meat the Weasels Volume 1: Fondue Cabaret ==
Inspired by the response to their first live performance, the expanded band polished their basement tapes and released Meat the Weasels: Volume 1, Fondue Cabaret in 1993. The album’s opening cut, “Let the Killing Begin,” is the first in a series of Weasels songs about notorious killers, in this case Henry Lee Lucas. It incorporates a tongue-in-cheek adaptation of the closing soliloquy from the Doors’ “The End”. In addition to Fun, Weäsell and Graf, the record featured Jon Cohen (bass guitar and slide whistle), Rocky Petrocelli (drums) and David Maynard (guitar); Maynard had been a member of the New York Rubber Rock Band, whose 1975 single "Disco Lucy", was named "Worst Single of the Year" by Billboard. Following Meat the Weasels' release, the group continued to perform live, though with continued instability in the drummer's seat, which was occupied for various dates by Petrocelli, Jordan Cohen (later of Powerman 5000 and Blue Man Group), Dave King, Doug Klein, Dan Roberts, Steve Scoons, Dave Berger and Steve Candlen; the latter two emerged as drummers of choice for The Weasels' middle recording period.

Meat the Weasels Volume I: Fondue Cabaret included the following songs:

1. “Let the Killing Begin”
2. “Amway Man”
3. “Red Meat”
4. “Might As Well Try You” (Sometimes listed as “Might As Well Try Ewe”)
5. “Plastic Plant”
6. “Dancing On Your Grave”
7. “Have A Nice Day”
8. “Never Been to Jersey”
9. “Maybe You’re Dead”
10. “Put Your Finger in My Brain”
11. “When the Fat Lady Sings”
12. “Little Town Ashtray Disaster”

== Leon’s Mystical Head ==
In 1995, the Weasels undertook their first formal studio experience at New Music Studios in Albany with production and engineering support from Ted Malia, who had also worked with R.E.M., Bobby Brown and others. Maynard, Candlen and Jon Cohen returned to perform with Weäsell, Fun and Graf on the New Music sessions. The initial sessions were creatively fruitful, yet tense; Cohen left the group and was replaced by Alan Okey for subsequent sessions. Leon’s Mystical Head (a title inspired by a Firesign Theatre sketch) featured “Paging Larry Storch,” the first installment of "The Larry Trilogy," a series based on the premise that the purest essence of contemporary American comedy was to be found in the film and television work of Larry Fine, Larry Hovis and Larry Storch. The Weasels continued their homages to notorious killers with “A Fish,” about infamous cannibal Albert Fish. After the release of Leon’s Mystical Head, the band's core members decided that all subsequent albums would be recorded and engineered under their own direct supervision, with Graf taking a prominent creative role in the increasingly elaborate productions of Fun and Weäsell's compositions. Live shows from this period occasionally featured “Weasel Vision,” a multimedia visual presentation created by artists Michael Oatman and John J.A. Jannone. In July 2006, "Bar-B-Q Baby" was selected for regular broadcast on Doctor Demento's internationally syndicated radio show.

Leon’s Mystical Head included the following songs:

1. “Leon’s Mystical Head”
2. “A Fish”
3. “Bulldoze the Moon”
4. “Klaus Barbie and Ken”
5. “Bang My Head”
6. “Poor Blind Sheehan”
7. “Bitch Is All Business”
8. “Paging Larry Storch”
9. “Bar-B-Q Baby”
10. “Murder of Crow”
11. “Ahab”
12. “The Short Song” (hidden track)

== Uranus Or Bust ==
The next Weasels album, Uranus or Bust, took three years to write, record and release. Behind original cover art by Michael Oatman, Fun (billed as Racer Fun), Weäsell (billed as Chairman Wow) and Graf (now Sir Mixalot of Ice-T) offered 16 new compositions (one hidden) produced and engineered at Graf's Big Saucy Sound Studio. Berger, Maynard and Okey returned to the band, and were joined by keyboardist Adrian Cohen, brother of Weasel emeriti Jordan and Jon, the latter of whom guests on Uranus, as do drummers Candlen, Petrocelli and Larry Levine, Amy Abdou (violin), Rena Graf (vocals), Mike Pauley (bass) and “some Russian friend of Candlen’s” (voices). Two of Uranus’ songs were commissioned as part of multimedia art installations created by Oatman. “Hall of Pain” (about this album's representative Notorious Killer, nineteenth-century Troy, New York's Andress Hall) was composed as part of “Awful Disclosures: The Life and Confessions of Andress Hall,” while “Monument Road” appeared in conjunction with “Henry Perkins and the Eugenics Survey of Vermont.” Maynard composed the music for one song on the album, “Dumber Than Me,” while the Larry Trilogy continued with “Ou Est Monsieur Crane?”, which was also performed live by the Clown Punchers, a side project featuring Weäsell and Mike Goudreau, VH1 staff writer for such programs as I Love the '80s and Before They Were Rock Stars. In May 2006, "Mr. Yamamoto" (a.k.a. "Jimmy's Talking Pants") was selected for broadcast on Doctor Demento's internationally syndicated radio show.

Uranus or Bust included the following songs:

1. “Harvey Loped Along”
2. “Something Wicked”
3. “Onan Spilled His Seed”
4. “Small Engine Repair”
5. “MacNeice”
6. “Alison Wonderbread”
7. “Ou Est Monsieur Crane?”
8. “Monument Road”
9. “Lemons”
10. “A Million Vacations”
11. “Dumber Than Me”
12. “Crogolin Grange”
13. “Jimmy’s Talking Pants” (sometimes listed as “Mr. Yamamoto”)
14. “Hale-Bopp (Recorded Live at the Village Gate, NYC, November 23, 1961)”
15. “Hall of Pain”
16. “Rachel” (a hidden track)

== GenerationXcrement ==
Originally conceived as the bonus disc for a planned four-record box set retrospective, GenerationXcrement was released in 2000 and provided an assortment of alternate takes and unreleased tracks from the group's first decade, including some of the earliest “basement tapes” from their pre-live incarnations. On October 28, 2000, the band played what is, to date, their last live show at Valentine's Music Hall in Albany to support this disc's release. Fun and Weäsell were joined onstage by Jon Cohen (bass), drummer Scott Appicelli and hired hands Steve Watson (keyboards) and Nathaniel Ward (guitar). Graf no longer performed onstage with the Weasels, but provided sound mix and supplements from the engineer's booth. GenerationXcrement featured performers from throughout the band's history, including the following musicians not credited elsewhere in their recorded canon: Mike Sheehan (keyboards), Andy Manion (guitar) and Mary Panza (voice).

The album included the following songs:

1. "Man On the Moon”
2. “Fluffy Wuffy Bunnies”
3. “Billy Boy”
4. “Let the Killing Begin”
5. "Have A Nice Day”
6. “Old Spot Old Stain”
7. “Amway Man”
8. “Gawdzilla”
9. “A Fish”
10. “Fat Lady Sings”
11. “Part On the Square” (written for an art installation by Oatman, and sometimes listed as "Hard On the Square")
12. “Generation Excrement”

== Axis of Weasel ==
The first release of The Weasels' studio-only era was Axis of Weasel, released in January 2006. Produced and engineered by Graf at Big Saucy Sound, the album's 12 songs feature Fun, Weäsell, Graf, Jon Cohen (bass and Chapman Stick), Adrian Cohen (keyboards), Appicelli (drums), and new guitarist Matt Pirog. Guests on the record include stalwart guitarist Maynard on lead and slide guitars, Rena Graf and Mike Pauley (backing vocals), Dud Hennessey (mouth harp), Nathaniel Ward (guitar) and J. Eric Smith (theremin). Axis of Weasel was originally titled It Takes A Village to Raise a Village Idiot and is referenced as such in news articles and reviews from this period. The Larry Trilogy continued with closing track “Everything’s Fine.” Album opener “Hey Joey Doyle” takes film masterpiece On the Waterfront as its launching point. An edit from “Dirtnap” was broadcast nationally in January 2006 as part of National Public Radio’s “A Word to the Wise” segment, dealing with coffins, caskets and undertakers.

Axis of Weasel included the following tracks:

1. "Hey Joey Doyle”
2. “Where Cheese Is King”
3. “Flergen, A Swede”
4. “Suckling”
5. “Transparent”
6. “Whither Goest the Waitress”
7. “1973”
8. “Officer Gerbils”
9. "Cosmic Rays”
10. “Under A Cheddar Moon”
11. “Dirtnap”
12. “Everything’s Fine”

== Little Big Man ==
In Spring 2006, a new Weasels song called "Little Big Man" was featured in "Model Citizens", an exhibition and series of documentary videos spanning four Northeast communities and featuring the work of over 25 model makers and curated as part of the Public Art/Moving Site Project; the show also involved longtime Weasels collaborator Michael Oatman. "Little Big Man" featured Fun, Graf, Weäsell and Pirog from the Axis of Weasel band, joined by returning Leon/Uranus bassist Alan Okey and Al Kash, an internationally recognized veteran drummer whose first recordings were with Australian band, Blackfeather on their 1971 album At the Mountains of Madness. Kash also played drums in Florida for Tiger Tiger, a Miccosukee Indian band in the 1970s before returning to the Albany area to form regional '80s new wave legends Fear of Strangers (originally known as the Units), a band that also featured Aimee Mann collaborator Todd Nelson (guitar), with whom Kash later played in the Rumdummies.

1. "Little Big Man"

== AARP Go The Weasels ==
Graf, Pirog and Okey left The Weasels after the completion of "Little Big Man," with Jon Cohen returning as bassist. In September 2010, The Weasels released a single and video, "Do The Teabag," featuring a new core line-up of Fun (Vocals, keyboards, saxophone), Weäsell (guitar, vocals), Kash (drums) and Jon Cohen (bass). The full-length AARP Go The Weasels was released on February 14, 2013 (Valentine's Day), and included "Do The Teabag" in its 15-track playlist. Fun, Weasell, Jon Cohen and Kash are joined on the album by guitarists Chuck D’Aloia (Nick Brignola, Happy Rhodes) and Eric Finn, saxophone player Brian Patneaude, vocalist Sarah La Duke, keyboardists Adrian Cohen and Mike Kelley and percussionist Scott Apicelli, who also co-produced the album with Fun and Weäsell.

AARP Go The Weasels includes the following tracks:

1. "Father Weasel"
2. "A Friend in Tweed"
3. "1-800-MORON"
4. "Zucchini Park"
5. "Do The Teabag"
6. "Driving Albert's Brain"
7. "What Says Creep" (re-make of "Billy Boy" from Generation Xcrement)
8. "Timmy's in Trouble"
9. "Freemason Reese" (re-make of "Part on the Square" from Generation Xcrement)
10. "Last Supper on Lark Street"
11. "Invasion of the Body"
12. "Trotsky in the Bronx"
13. "Drink Your Tea"
14. "Wailing Song"
15. "Doubting Thomas"

== Also Sprach Larrythustra ==
In May 2015, the Weasels released a five-track EP titled Also Sprach Larrythustra, which continues the group's homage to the Trilogy of Larry by featuring a cover image of Larry Fine as the Egyptian Sphynx. Fun, Weäsell and D'Aloia return from the AARP Go The Weasels band, with session professional and instructional writer Art Bernstein replacing Al Kash on drums.

Songs include:

1. "Spin"
2. "Ding Ding"
3. "Where Is The Polar Bear"
4. "Diamond Blue Gremlin"
5. "Saffron Nearly"

== The Man Who Saw Tomorrow ==
The Weasels' seventh full-length album, The Man Who Saw Tomorrow, was released in November 2018, featuring a core band of Fun (vocals, keyboards, guitar, jazz flute), Weäsell (guitars, vocals), D'Aloia (lead guitar, bass) and Bernstein (drums), supplemented by guest bassists Charles Berthoud and Baba Elefante, and guest keyboardists Joshua Hegg and Mike Kelley. Chris Graf returned to provide backing vocals and mix the album with Scott Apicelli, and Michael Oatman from the "Weasel Vision" era provided the original cover art.

The album featured 15 songs:

1. "Nostradamus is Dead"
2. "Et Tu Harvey"
3. "Winona Minnesota"
4. "Ointment For My Stump"
5. "George Barely"
6. "Fancy That"
7. "Wokeflake"
8. "Yuge"
9. "Gold Medal Flower"
10. "Finnegans Wake"
11. "I Sing The Weiner Electric"
12. "Planieren Sie Den Mond" (Instrumental reinterpretation of "Bulldoze The Moon" from Leon's Mystical Head).
13. "Cherry Of Course"
14. "The New Black"
15. "When In Rome"

== The Flying Bobs and the Death of Chris Graf ==
In 2021, Weäsell, Graf, early-era Weasels' drummer Dave Berger, and long-time bass collaborator Jon Cohen (with support from guitarists Chuck D'Aloia, Crick Diefendorf and Andy Baker, keyboardists Robert Lindquist and Dan McShaw, and sax players Daniel Ian Smith and Jeff Nania) issued a Weasels-adjacent album entitled High Fidelity Virtue Signaling Party, and credited to The Flying Bobs. The album included a re-make of the Weasels' cut "Something Wicked" from Uranus or Bust, along with eleven new tracks composed by Weäsell and Graf. In January 2022, Chris Graf died from complications associated with COVID-19 infection.
