= BJ Ward (poet) =

American poet (born 1967)

BJ Ward (born 1967) is an American poet. Ward is a recipient of the Pushcart Prize (Anthology XXVIII, 2004) for poetry and two Distinguished Artist Fellowships from the New Jersey State Council on the Arts. He has published three full books of poetry and has been featured in many journals including: Cerebellum, Edison Literary Review, Journal of Jersey Poets, Kimera, Lips, Long Shot, Maelstrom, Mid-American Review, Natural Bridge, Painted Bride Quarterly, Poetry, Puerto del Sol, Prairie, Spitball, and TriQuarterly. His poem "For the Children of the World Trade Center Victims," is cast in bronze and featured at Grounds for Sculpture, an outdoor sculpture museum in Hamilton, New Jersey. Ward is an Assistant Professor of English at Warren County Community College and has served as University Distinguished Fellow at Syracuse University.

BJ Ward is an active educator in a number of realms. He teaches writing workshops in the public school system throughout New Jersey, and his work there earns him yearly residencies in many school districts.

== Works ==
- Landing in New Jersey With Soft Hands, poetry (Berkeley: North Atlantic Books, 1994)
- 17 Love Poems With No Despair, poetry (Berkeley: North Atlantic Books, 1997)
- Gravedigger's Birthday, poetry (Berkeley: North Atlantic Books, 2002)
- Jackleg Opera: Collected Poems, 1990 to 2013, poetry (Berkeley: North Atlantic Books [Io Poetry Series], 2013)
