= Bryan Ward (priest) =

- Born: 7 August 1906; Summer Hill, New South Wales
- Died: 27 August 1989 (aged 83); Queensland
- Education: Newington College; University of Sydney
- Occupation: Clergyman
- Title: The Venerable Archdeacon Bryan Ward MA
- Spouse(s): Edith Ismena Clare (née McCulloch); Born 1909 – Died 1974
- Parent: C B Ward

Born Walter Bryan Ward (7 August 1906 – 27 August 1989), Bryan Ward was an Australian clergyman active in the mid-20th century with the Anglican Church of Australia. He served as a Royal Australian Air Force Chaplain during World War II.

== Early life ==
Ward was born in Sydney the third son of C B Ward of Summer Hill, New South Wales, and attended Newington College commencing in 1921. At the end of 1924, Ward was named equal Dux of the College and received the Schofield Scholarship and the Halse Rogers Prize. He went up to the University of Sydney and in 1928 graduated as a Bachelor of Arts.

== Working life ==
Upon graduation, Ward taught at All Souls', Charters Towers, before being admitted as a deacon at St James' Cathedral, Townsville in 1930. He was ordained as a priest the following year. Ward was the Rector of Ingham, Queensland at the beginning of World War II when he started his chaplaincy to the militia. From 1966–1975 he served at St Thomas' Anglican Church, Toowong, Queensland, during which time he was also Archdeacon of the Downs in the Brisbane diocese.

== Thesis ==
His 1983 Master of Arts thesis from the University of Queensland, The Care of the Cerebral Palsied in Australia: with particular reference to the voluntary organizations, the Australian Cerebral Palsy Association and State/Commonwealth involvement from the Second World War until the present day, is held by the National Library of Australia.

== Honours ==
- Queen Elizabeth II Coronation Medal (1953)
