= Gerald Ward =

Gerald Ward may refer to:

- Gerald Ward (cricketer) (1877–1914), English cricketer and British Army officer
- Gerald Ward (biker) (born 1948), Canadian criminal
- Gerald Ward, actor in the 1915 film The Warrens of Virginia

== See also ==
- Gerry Ward (disambiguation)
