= Lawrence M. Ward =

Canadian neuroscientist and psychophysicist

Lawrence M. Ward is a Canadian neuroscientist and psychophysicist at the Department of Psychology at the University of British Columbia. He studied at Harvard University (AB) and Duke University, where he received his PhD in Experimental Psychology with a minor in mathematics. His current interests are cognitive neuroscience of attention and consciousness with special emphasis on EEG and MEG studies of neuronal synchronization; information transfer between brain regions underlying cognition; psychophysics, biophysics and general theory of stochastic resonance; computational studies of neuronal oscillations and synchronization; neural plasticity; nonlinear dynamical systems theory and its applications in cognitive neuroscience. He co-authored the textbook "Sensation and Perception" with Stanley Coren, and James T. Enns, which went into six editions spanning the period 1978 to 2004.

== Selected publications ==
- Ward, L.M. (2002). Dynamical Cognitive Science. Cambridge, MA: MIT Press (355+xv pages).
- Coren, S., Ward, L.M., & Enns, J.T. (2004). Sensation and Perception, Sixth Edition. Hoboken, NJ: Wiley. (598+x pages)
- Wright, R. D., & Ward, L. M. (2008). Orienting of Attention. New York: Oxford University Press. (292+xiv pages)
- Doesburg, S.M.; Green, J.J.; McDonald, J.J.; Ward, L.M. (2009). "Rhythms of consciousness: Binocular rivalry reveals large-scale oscillatory network dynamics mediating visual perception". PLOS ONE. 4 (7) e6142. Bibcode:2009PLoSO...4.6142D. doi:10.1371/journal.pone.0006142. PMC 2702101. PMID 19582165.
- McDonnell, M.D.; Ward, L.M. (2011). "The benefits of noise in neural systems: bridging theory and experiment". Nature Reviews Neuroscience. 12 (7): 415–425. doi:10.1038/nrn3061. PMID 21685932. S2CID 1699918.
- Ward, L.M. (2011). "The thalamic dynamic core theory of conscious experience". Consciousness and Cognition. 20 (2): 464–486. doi:10.1016/j.concog.2011.01.007. PMID 21349742. S2CID 6099949.
- Erland, S.; Greenwood, P.E.; Ward, L.M. (2011). "1/fα noise" is equivalent to an eigenstructure power relation". Europhysics Letters. 95 (6) 60006. Bibcode:2011EL.....9560006E. doi:10.1209/0295-5075/95/60006. S2CID 122277499.
- Bedo, N.; Ribary, U.; Ward, L.M. (2014). "Fast dynamics of cortical effective connectivy during word reading". PLOS ONE. 9 (2) e88940. doi:10.1371/journal.pone.0088940. PMC 3925174. PMID 24551193.
- Ward, L.M. (2013). "The thalamus: Gateway to the mind". WIREs Cognitive Science. 4 (6): 609–622. doi:10.1002/wcs.1256. PMID 26304267. S2CID 12637154.
- MacLean, S.E.; Ward, L.M. (2014). "Temporo-frontal phase synchronization supports hierarchical network for mismatch negativity". Clinical Neurophysiology. 125 (8): 1604–1617. doi:10.1016/j.clinph.2013.12.109. hdl:2429/33788. PMID 24508191. S2CID 206798109.
- Greenwood, P.E.; McDonnell, M.D.; Ward, L.M. (2015). "Dynamics of gamma bursts in local field potentials". Neural Computation. 27 (1): 74–103. doi:10.1162/neco_a_00688. PMID 25380331. S2CID 6965192.
