= Michael Ward (economist) =

British economist and statistician

- Born: 1939
- Died: 2008 (aged 68–69)

Academic work
- Discipline: statistics

Michael Ward (1939 – 2008) was a British economist and statistician who contributed significantly to the evolution of the international statistical system in the post-war period.

== Education and career ==
Ward took an honours degree in statistics and economics at the University of Exeter in 1958 and was later awarded his Master of Arts at the University of Cambridge. In 1965 he was elected fellow of Selwyn College, Cambridge, and worked as Director of Economic Studies. He served as dean of the college from 1970 to 1972. In 1975 he was appointed Director of the Statistical Program at the Institute of Development Studies at the University of Sussex.

At both at Cambridge and Sussex he worked with some of the foremost development economists of the time, including Richard Jolly, Graham Pyatt, Dudley Seers, and Richard Stone—people who, as Ward observed in his book Quantifying the World, "abhorred any suggestion that facts be fit to theory and spent their lives building theory around observed facts and creating frameworks that more usefully depicted how the real world worked."

Ward worked in many developing countries and gained wide experience of statistics and their use in framing policies for economic and social development. He started work in 1961 in Salisbury, Southern Rhodesia (now Harare, Zimbabwe) in what was then the Statistical Office of the Federation of Rhodesia and Nyasaland. A few years later he worked in the statistical office of Lesotho and from there moved to Fiji, where he was Head of the Government Statistical Service. From 1972 he worked for UNESCO as a regional statistical advisor in southern Africa, an assignment that took him to Lesotho, Botswana, Malawi, Swaziland, South Africa, Uganda, Zambia, and Zimbabwe. From 1999 to 2000 he worked in Phnom Penh as Director of Rehabilitation and Economic Advisor in the UN peacekeeping mission to Cambodia.

During his career, Ward worked with other international agencies including the Food and Agriculture Organization, International Monetary Fund, Asian Development Bank, World Bank, and the Organisation for Economic Co-operation and Development.

His links with the OECD began in the early 1970s. He participated in workshops on statistics in developing countries at the OECD Development Centre. In 1975, between the UNESCO assignments and the post at Sussex University, he worked for a few months as consultant for OECD on the measurement of capital. In 1982, Ward joined the OECD full-time and made the first OECD-Eurostat purchasing power parity calculations for 1980.

In 1985, Ward worked as Principal Economist at the World Bank. In 1995 Ward was appointed head of the Bank's Statistical Advisory Services and in this capacity he worked the OECD's Development Aid Committee in drawing up a set of international development targets which later became the Millennium Development Goals, addressing a range of economic, social, demographic and environmental concerns. Ward retired in 2000.

After retirement, Ward's expertise and advice continued to be sought by international agencies as well as by national statistical offices including those of China and India. The 2004 publication Quantifying the World, part of the UN's Intellectual History Project, was one of his major achievements in this period. It reviewed the achievements and failures of the United Nation statistical services over the previous 60 years.

== Honours ==
Michael is a Fellow of the Royal Statistical Society and an active member of the International Statistical Institute and the International Association for Research in Income and Wealth. In 1999 he was awarded the Henry Willem Methorst Medal of the International Statistical Institute for "outstanding contributions to international statistics." In 2000, he was elected Chair of the International Association for Research in Income and Wealth and he served for several years on the Statistical Advisory Panel for the United Nations Development Programme Human Development Report.

== Publications ==
Ward was a prolific writer and more than fifty of his articles and reviews were published in The Review of Income and Wealth, Economics, Economic Journal, The Banker, The Bankers Magazine, Economic Record, The Economist, International Herald Tribune, Journal of Modern African Studies, Journal of Development Studies, International Development, Journal of Business Economists, American Scientist and the IDS Bulletin.

His contributions to edited volumes included the Encyclopædia Britannica (on economic forecasting and international comparisons); Indicator Systems for Political, Economic and Social Analysis (Taylor); Development in small countries (Selwyn); Development Planning in Developing Countries (OECD); Surveys and Social Statistics (Bulmer); International Comparisons (Heston and Summers); Problems and Issues in International Comparisons (Salazar-Camillo and Rao); National Accounts in Developing Countries (OECD); 1999 ISI Conference (Helsinki), Collected Papers; 2001 ISI Conference (Seoul), Collected Papers; Statistics and Human Rights (IAOS Montreux, 2000), Selected Papers.

His main publications were:

- Quantifying the World; UN Ideas and Statistics, Volume 2 in the UN Intellectual History Project, Indiana University Press, 2002
- Identifying the Poor (with Graham Pyatt), ISI Press, Netherlands, 1999
- UN Manual on International Comparisons (with Lazlo Drechsler and Alan Heston), NY, 1990
- National Expenditures and Purchasing Power Parities in OECD Countries, OECD, Paris, 1985
- The Measurement of Capital, OECD, Paris 1976
- The Role of Investment in Development, Cambridge University Press, England, 1972
- The National Income and Balance of Payments of Fiji, Government Printer, Suva, 1969
