= David E. Ward =

American politician

- Ward in 1939

Member of the Florida Senate from the 24th district
- In office 1939–1941

Personal details
- Born: September 26, 1909 Fort Myers, Florida, U.S.
- Died: February 16, 1995 (aged 85)
- Party: Democratic
- Education: University of Florida; Cumberland Law School

David E. Ward (September 26, 1909 – February 16, 1995) was an American politician. He served as a Democratic member for the 24th district of the Florida Senate.

== Life and career ==
Ward was born in Fort Myers, Florida. He attended the University of Florida and Cumberland Law School.

Ward served in the Florida Senate from 1939 to 1941, representing the 24th district.

Ward died on February 16, 1995, at the age of 85.
