= Eddie (given name) =

- Pronunciation: /ˈɛdi/
- Gender: Male

Origin
- Origin: English
- Meaning: Wealth defender

Other names
- Alternative spelling: Eddy
- Related names: Edward, Edmund, Edgar, Edwin, Edsel, Eduardo, Edmundo, Ed

Eddie or Eddy is a diminutive for given names such as Edward, Edmund, Edgar, Edison, Edsel, Edwin, Eduardo, Edmundo or Ed. It is also occasionally used as a given name on its own. Notable people known as Eddie or Eddy include:

== Sports ==
- Eddie Aikau (1946–1978), American surfer
- Eddie Alvarez (born 1984), American mixed martial artist
- Eddy Antoine (1949–2026), Haitian footballer
- Eddie Barth (1931–2010), American actor
- Eddie Charlton (1929–2004), Australian snooker and billiards player
- Eddie Charlton (born 1988), English squash player
- Eddie Cheever (born 1958), American race car driver
- Eddy Curry (born 1982), American professional basketball player
- Eddy Edigin (born 1995), German professional basketball player
- Eddie "The Eagle" Edwards (born 1963), British ski jumper
- Eddie Elder (born 1989), American football player
- Eddie Fatu (1973–2009), Samoan-American wrestler
- Eddie Foster (born 1954), American football player
- Eddie Genborg (born 2007), Swedish ice hockey player
- Eddie Griffin (basketball) (1982–2007), American basketball player
- Eddie Guardado (born 1970), American baseball closer
- Eddie Guerrero (1967–2005), Mexican-American professional wrestler
- Eddie Hall (born 1988), English professional strongman, winner of the 2017 World's Strongest Man Competition
- Eddy Hamel (1902–1943), American soccer player for Dutch club AFC Ajax who was killed by the Nazis in Auschwitz concentration camp
- Eddie House (born 1978), American basketball player
- Eddie Irvine (born 1965), Northern Irish Formula One driver
- Eddie Jackson (safety) (born 1993), American football player
- Eddie Jones (basketball) (born 1971), American basketball player
- Eddie Jones (rugby union) (born 1960), Australian rugby coach and former player
- Eddy Koaz (born 1959), Israeli Olympic judoka
- Eddy W M Lai (born 1973), horse racing jockey
- Eddie Laure (born 1977), Filipino basketball player
- Eddie McCreadie (1940–2026), Scottish footballer and manager
- Eddie Melai (1941–2004), Australian rules footballer
- Eddy Merckx (born 1945), Belgian professional cyclist
- Eddie Miles (born 1968), American football player
- Eddie Murray (born 1956), American baseball player
- Eddie O'Sullivan (born 1958), head coach of Irish rugby team
- Eddy Piñeiro (born 1995), American football player
- Eddie Price (1925–1979), Tulane University Green Wave and NFL running back
- Eddie Robinson (basketball) (born 1976), American basketball player
- Eddie Salcedo (born 2001), Italian footballer
- Eddie Vanderdoes (born 1994), American football player
- Eddie "E.J." Williams Jr. (born 2001), American football player
- Eddy Wilson (American football) (born 1997), American football player

== Music ==
- Eddy Arnold (1918–2008), American country music singer and musician
- Eddie Brock (singer) (born 1997), Italian singer-songwriter
- Eddie Clarke (musician) (1950–2018), British guitarist, member of the band Motörhead
- Eddy Chen (born 1993), Australian born-Taiwanese violinist, performing on the TwoSet Violin YouTube channel
- Eddie Cochran (1938–1960), American rockabilly musician
- Eddie Fisher (singer) (1928–2010), American singer
- Eddy Grant (born 1948), Guyana-born British reggae musician
- Eddie Harsch (1957–2016), Canadian keyboardist, member of The Black Crowes
- Eddie "Evil Eddie" Jacobson, frontman for Australian band Butterfingers
- Eddie McGuire (born 1964), Australian television presenter and businessman
- Eddy Mitchell (born 1942), French rock singer and actor
- Eddie Money (1949–2019), stage name of Edward Mahoney, American rock musician
- Eddie Morton (1870–1938), American rag-time singer and comedian
- Eddie Peabody (1902–1970), American Plectrum banjoist and Musical Entertainer
- Eddie Peregrina (1945–1977), Filipino singer and matinee idol
- Eddie Rabbitt (1941–1998), American country music singer and songwriter
- Eddie Van Halen (1955–2020), American guitarist and songwriter
- Eddie Vedder (born 1964), American singer, musician and songwriter, frontman of Pearl Jam
- Eddy Zervigon (born 1942), Cuban flautist and bandleader
- Eddie (Iron Maiden), mascot of the band Iron Maiden
- Eddy de Pretto (born 1993), French singer

== Acting ==
- Eddie Cahill (born 1978), American actor
- Eddie Cibrian (born 1973), Cuban-American actor
- Eddie Garcia (1929–2019), Filipino actor, television personality, and producer
- Eddie Gutierrez (actor) (born 1942), Filipino actor and former matinee idol
- Eddie Izzard (born 1962), English actor, comedian, writer and political activist.
- Eddie Mercado (1938–2006), Filipino film actor, television actor, film director, television director, and television presenter
- Eddie Mesa (born 1940), Filipino retired actor and singer
- Eddie Murphy (born 1961), African-American actor, comedian and singer.
- Eddie Paskey (1939–2021), American actor
- Eddie Redmayne (born 1982), English actor
- Eddie Rodriguez (1932–2001), Filipino film actor and director
- Eddie Shin, Korean-American actor
- Eddie Spears, (born 1982), Indigenous-American actor

== Politics ==
- Eddy Baldewijns (born 1945), Belgian politician
- Eddie Hughes (Australian politician)
- Eddie Hughes (British politician) (born 1968)
- Eddie Lumsden (born 1952), American politician
- Eddie Settle, North Carolinan senator

== Other professions ==
- Eddie Bauer (1899–1986), American outdoorsman, inventor, author, and businessman
- Eddie Carmel (born Oded Ha-Carmeili; 1936–1972), Israeli-born entertainer with gigantism and acromegaly, popularly known as "The Jewish Giant"
- Eddy de Jongh (born 1931), Dutch art historian
- Eddie Fitte (born 1987), Argentinian journalist, writer
- Eddie Gossage (born 1958), American businessman, race promoter
- Eddie Linden (1935–2023), Scottish-Irish poet and magazine editor
- Eddie Mosley (1947–2020), American serial killer
- Eddie Price III (born 1953), Louisiana elected official
- Eddie Rickenbacker (1890–1973), American World War I flying ace, credited with shooting down more enemy planes than any other American pilot during that conflict
- Eddie Villanueva (born 1946), Filipino evangelist and president-founder of the Jesus Is Lord Church Worldwide
- Eddie Woo, Australian mathematician

== Fictional characters ==
- Eddy Stone, a main character in the 1961 British drama film Victim, played by Donald Churchill
- Eddie, a character played by Meat Loaf in the 1975 musical Rocky Horror Picture Show
- Eddie, a character in 1998 American comedy movie My Giant
- Eddie, a character in the movie 2009 American comedy film The Hangover
- Eddie, one of the police officers in the American sitcom The Simpsons
- Eddie, a dog in the American sitcom Frasier
- Eddie, the shipboard computer on the starship Heart of Gold in The Hitchhiker's Guide to the Galaxy
- Eddie, one of the main characters in the Ice Age film franchise
- Eddie, the antagonist of the racing video game Need for Speed: Underground, also appears in Need for Speed (2015 video game)
- Eddy (Tony Sampson in the entire Ed, Edd n Eddy franchise; James Arnold Taylor in FusionFall) is the self-appointed leader of the Eds
- Eddie Brock, anti-hero also known as Venom
- Eddie Carr, field researcher from The Lost World by Michael Crichton
- Eddie Dean (The Dark Tower), from The Dark Tower
- Eddy Gordo, in the video game series Tekken
- Eddie Haskell, a fictional character on the Leave It to Beaver television sitcom
- Eddie Elizabeth Hitler, from the 1990s British comedy show Bottom, played by Adrian Edmondson
- Eddie Kaspbrak, from Stephen King's It
- Eddie Lindstrom, a character in a 2001 American independent comedy-drama movie Little Secrets
- Eddie Menuek, from the sitcom Friends
- Eddie Morra, in the 2011 film Limitless
- Eddie "The Freak" Munson, a character in season 4 of Stranger Things
- Eddie Redcliffe, one of the main characters in the Australian series Deadloch
- Eddie Russett, the protagonist in the novel Shades of Grey: The Road to High Saffron by Jasper Fforde.
- Eddie Valiant, from Who Framed Roger Rabbit
- Eddie Windass, in the British soap-opera Coronation Street
- Eddie Winslow, from Family Matters
- Edwyn Gates, the protagonist of the indie video game Jackpot Crash Course
- Eddie, Iron Maiden mascot

== See also ==
- Eddy Rodríguez (disambiguation)
- Eddie the Eagle (disambiguation)
- Edie (name), given name and surname
- Eddy (surname)
