= Ed (given name) =

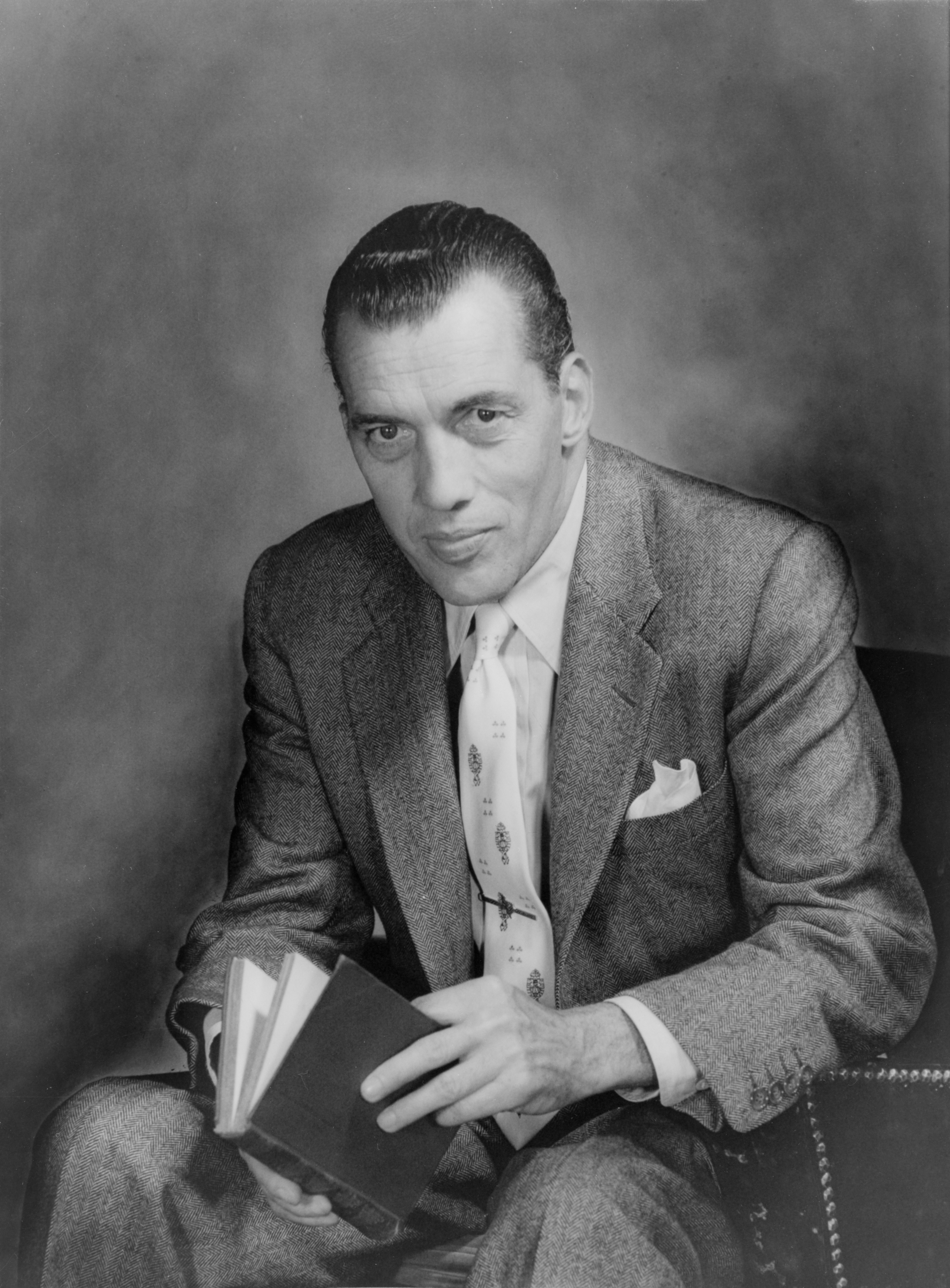
- Ed Sullivan in 1955
- Pronunciation: /ɛd/
- Gender: Male

Other names
- Related names: Edward, Eddie, Ted, Teddy

Ed is a masculine given name, usually a short form (hypocorism) of Edward, Edgar, Edmund, Edwin, Edith, etc. It may refer to:

== People ==
- Ed Ames (1927–2023), American singer
- Ed Asner (1929–2021), American actor
- Ed Balls (born 1967), British politician
- Ed Becker, Las Vegas promoter, businessman, private investigator and author
- Ed Begley (1901–1970), American actor
- Ed Begley Jr. (born 1949), American actor and environmentalist
- Ed Brown (racing driver, born 1920) (1920–2000), American racing driver
- Ed Brown (racing driver) (born 1963), American racing driver
- Ed Bruce (1939–2021), American country music songwriter-singer
- Ed Buck (born 1954), American Democrat political activist and fundraiser
- Ed Buckingham, Canadian politician
- Ed Carpenter (disambiguation)
- Ed Coleman (disambiguation)
- Ed Conroy (basketball) (born 1967), American college basketball coach
- Ed Conroy (politician) (1946–2020), Canadian politician
- Ed Cook (American football) (1932–2007), American National Football League player
- Ed Cook (basketball), American college basketball player and head coach
- Ed Cota (born 1976), Panamanian basketball player
- Ed Crombie (born 1945), racing driver
- Ed Davey (born 1965), British politician
- Ed Dempsey, hockey coach
- Ed Diehl, American politician
- Ed Dodds, American football executive
- Ed Elisma (born 1975), American basketball player
- Ed Faron (born 1947), American author and pit bull breeder
- Ed Friendly (1922–2007), American television producer
- Ed Gein (1906–1984), American murderer and body snatcher
- Ed de Goey (born 1966), Dutch former football goalkeeper
- Ed Green (1860–1912), American Major League Baseball pitcher
- Ed Harris (born 1950), American actor, producer, director and screenwriter
- Ed Helms (born 1974), American actor and comedian
- Ed Jenkins (disambiguation)
- Ed Kennedy (infielder) (1861–1912), Major League Baseball player
- Ed Kennedy (outfielder) (1856–1905), Major League Baseball player
- Ed Koch (1924–2013), American politician and mayor of New York City from 1978 to 1989
- Ed Kubale (1899–1971), American football player and coach
- Ed LaDou (1955–2007), American chef, known for inventing California-style pizza
- Ed Lee (disambiguation)
- Ed Long (disambiguation)
- Ed Markey (born 1946), American politician
- Ed Maverick (born 2001), Mexican singer and songwriter
- Ed McMahon (1923–2009), American announcer, actor and singer
- Ed Miliband (born 1969), British politician
- Ed Mirvish (1914–2007), American-Canadian businessman, philanthropist and theatrical impresario
- Ed Montague (shortstop) (1905–1988), American Major League Baseball player
- Ed Montague (umpire) (born 1948), American Major League Baseball umpire
- Ed Newman (born 1951), American All-Pro football player
- Ed O'Bannon (born 1972), American basketball player
- Ed O'Neal, a member of the Dixie Melody Boys American Southern Gospel quartet
- Ed O'Neil (born 1952), American football coach and former National Football League player
- Ed O'Neil (baseball) (1859–1892), American Major League Baseball pitcher
- Ed O'Neill (born 1946), American actor
- Ed Oliver (American football) (born 1997), American football player
- Ed Orgeron (born 1961), American football coach
- Ed Partin, Teamsters official
- Ed Pawlowski, American politician
- Ed Picson (1953–2023), Filipino sportscaster
- Ed Price (disambiguation)
- Ed Reid, American author and investigative journalist who exposed organized crime
- Ed Reynolds (safety) (born 1991), American football player
- Ed Roberts (disambiguation)
- Ed Rubinoff (born 1935), American tennis player
- Ed Schultz (1954–2018), American television and radio host, political commentator and former sports broadcaster
- Ed Shaw (American football) (1895–1964), American National Football League player
- Ed Sheeran (born 1991), English singer and songwriter
- Ed Skrein (born 1983), English actor and rapper
- Ed Small (born 1959), Canadian ice hockey player
- Ed Small (American football) (born 2006), American football player
- Ed Stasium (fl. 1970–present), American record producer and engineer
- Ed Stein (baseball) (1869–1928), American baseball player
- Ed Sullivan (1901–1974), American television personality, reporter and syndicated columnist, creator and host of The Ed Sullivan Show
- Ed Taylor (disambiguation)
- Ed Trumbull (1860–1937), American baseball player
- Ed Walker (disambiguation)
- Ed Walsh (1881–1959), American Major League Baseball Hall-of-Fame pitcher and manager
- Ed Walsh Jr. (1905–1937), American Major League Baseball pitcher, son of Ed Walsh
- Ed Ward (ice hockey) (born 1969), Canadian retired National Hockey League player
- Ed Ward (writer) (1948–2021), American writer and radio commentator
- Ed. Weinberger (born 1945), American screenwriter and television producer
- Ed Williams (disambiguation)
- Ed Wood (1924–1978), American filmmaker, director, producer, actor and writer
- Ed Woods (born 2002), American football player
- Ed Wright (disambiguation)
- Ed Wynn (1886–1966), American actor and comedian
- Ed Yong (born 1981), British science journalist
- Ed Young (disambiguation)

== Fictional characters ==
- The title talking horse of Mister Ed, a 1960s television sitcom
- Ed Bighead, an anthropomorphic frog from the Nickelodeon show Rocko's Modern Life
- Ed Galbraith, a character from Breaking Bad and El Camino
- Ed Green (Law & Order), Detective on the television series Law & Order, portrayed by Jesse L. Martin
- Ed Grimley, created and portrayed by Martin Short
- Ed Hocken, a character from The Naked Gun universe
- Ed Killifer, a villain in the James Bond film Licence to Kill
- Ed the Sock, a puppet on television
- One of the title characters of Ed, Edd n Eddy, an animated television series
- Ed, a hyena from Disney's The Lion King
- The title character of Ed the Happy Clown, a graphic novel
- Ed, a hyena from Digger (webcomic)

== See also ==
- Big Ed (disambiguation), a list of people and a fictional character with the nickname
