= Edward Price =

Edward Price may refer to:

- Ed Price (Louisiana politician) (Edward J. Price), member of the Louisiana State Legislature
- Eddie Price (Edward Joseph Price Jr., 1925–1979), American football player and inductee to the College Football Hall of Fame; father of Eddie Price III
- Eddie Price III (Edward Joseph Price III, born 1952), American politician and former mayor of Mandeville, Louisiana
- Edward Price (Medal of Honor) (1840–?), American Civil War sailor and Medal of Honor recipient
- Edward Price (priest) (1770–1832), archdeacon of Killaloe
- Edward Dean Price (1919–1997), U.S. federal judge
- Edward G. Price (fl. c. 1988), Canadian political candidate
- Edward Henry Price (1822–1898), English cleric and headmaster
- Edward W. Price (engineer) (1920–2012), American rocket engineer
- Edward William Price (1832–1893), Australian civil servant, government resident of the Northern Territory
- Ned Price (Edward Price, born 1982), U.S. State Department spokesperson, former official of the CIA
- Reynolds Price (Edward Reynolds Price, 1933–2011), American writer and professor
- Ted Price (businessman) (born 1968), founder and former CEO of Insomniac Games, Inc.
- Ted Price (footballer) (Edward Price, 1883–1967), English football goalkeeper

== See also ==
- Ed Price (disambiguation)
- Edward Prime (disambiguation)
- Edwin Price (disambiguation)
