= Ted (given name) =

Ted is a masculine given name. It is usually a diminutive form (hypocorism) for Edward, Edwin, Edgar, Edmund, Theodore, among other names. Alternatives of Ted are Ned, Teddy, and Ed.

== People ==
=== Arts and media ===
==== Acting ====
- Ted Cassidy (1932–1979), American actor
- Ted Cole (born 1971), Canadian voice actor
- Ted Danson (born 1947), American actor
- Ted Donaldson (1933–2023), American actor
- Ted Healy (1896–1937), American comedian and actor
- Ted King (actor) (born 1965), American actor
- Ted Knight (1923–1986), American actor
- Ted Lange (born 1948), American actor, director and screenwriter
- Ted McGinley (born 1958), American actor
- Ted Shackelford (born 1946), American actor
- Ted Wilson, cast member of You Can't Do That On Television

==== Graphic arts ====
- Ted Jackson (born 1955), photographer
- Ted Key (1912–2008), American cartoonist and writer
- Ted Osborne (1900 or 1901–1968), comic artist
- Ted Rall (born 1963), American cartoonist and columnist

==== Music ====
- Ted Gärdestad (1956–1997), Swedish singer-songwriter
- Ted Heath (bandleader) (1902–1969), English bandleader
- Ted Herold (1942–2021), German singer
- Ted Key (musician) (born 1960), English bass guitarist
- Ted Nichols (1928–2026), American composer, conductor, arranger, educator, and minister of music
- Ted Nugent (born 1948), American guitarist
- Ted Sablay (born 1976), guitarist
- Bruce Slesinger (known simply as Ted), Dead Kennedys drummer

==== Writing ====
- Ted Allen (born 1965), American writer
- Ted Childs (born 1934), British television producer, screenwriter and director
- Ted Hughes (1930-1998), English Poet Laureate
- Ted Key (1912–2008), American cartoonist and writer
- Ted Rall (born 1963), American cartoonist and columnist

==== Other media occupations ====
- Ted Childs (born 1934), British television producer, screenwriter and director
- Ted Failon (born 1962), Filipino broadcast journalist
- Ted Healy (1896–1937), American comedian and actor
- Ted Koppel (born 1940), American broadcast journalist
- Ted Lange (born 1948), American actor, director and screenwriter
- Ted Lowe (1920–2011), English snooker commentator
- Ted Mack (radio-TV host) (1904–1976), US
- Ted Moore (1914–1987), British cinematographer
- Ted Turner (1938–2026), American businessman and television producer

=== Criminals ===
- Ted Bundy (1946–1989), American 1970s serial killer
- Ted Kaczynski ("The Unabomber"; 1942–2023), American terrorist
- Ted Jeffrey Otsuki (born 1951), American fugitive

=== Law ===
- Ted de Boer (born 1943), Dutch law scholar
- Ted Hughes (judge) (1927–2020), Canadian judge
- Ted Thomas (judge) (Edmund Walter Thomas, born 1934), former acting judge of the Supreme Court of New Zealand

=== Politics ===
- Ted Brown (activist) (born 1950), British gay rights activist
- Ted Budd (born 1971), American politician
- Ted Carpenter (politician) (1951–2020), American politician from Arizona
- Ted Cruz (born 1970), U.S. Senator
- Ted Hui (born 1982), Hong Kong politician
- Ted Japp, American politician
- Ted Jolliffe (1909–1998), Chinese-born Canadian politician
- Ted Kennedy (1932–2009), U.S. Senator
- Ted Knight (politician) (1933–2020), English Labour Party politician
- Ted Lieu (born 1969), U.S. Representative
- Ted Olson (born 1940), former U.S. Solicitor General
- Ted Sorensen (1928–2010), speechwriter
- Ted Stevens (1923–2010), U.S. Senator
- Ted Strickland (born 1941), U.S. politician
- Ted Wheeler (born 1962), American politician and former mayor of Portland, Oregon
- Ted Wilson (mayor) (1939–2024), mayor of Salt Lake City

=== Science and engineering ===
- Ted Baker (chemist) (born 1942), New Zealand scientist
- Ted J. Case (1947–2015), American ecologist
- Edmund "Ted" Snow Carpenter (1922–2011), American anthropologist
- E. E. Fresson (Ernest Edmund "Ted" Fresson, 1891–1963), British engineer and aviation pioneer
- Edmund "Ted" Happold (1930–1996), British engineer and founder of Buro Happold

=== Sports ===
==== American football ====
- Ted Bachman (born 1951–2023), American football player
- Ted Dailey (1908–1992), American football player
- Ted Ginn Jr. (born 1985), former American football player
- Ted Ginn Sr. (born 1955), American football coach and father of Ted Ginn Jr.
- Ted Greene (American football) (1932–1982), American football player
- Ted Hurst (born 2004), American football player
- Ted Marchibroda (1931–2016), American football player
- Ted Thompson (1953–2021), American football player
- Ted Vincent (born 1956), American football player
- Ted Wilson (American football) (born 1964), former American football wide receiver

==== Australian rules football ====
- Ted Atkinson (footballer) (1920–2016), Australian rules footballer
- Ted Baker (footballer) (1901–1986), Aussie rules footballer
- Ted Whitten (1933–1995), Australian football player

==== Baseball ====
- Ted Simmons (born 1949), American baseball player
- Ted Williams (1918–2002), American baseball player and manager

==== Canadian football ====
- Ted Gerela (1944–2020), Canadian football player
- Ted Milian (born 1954), Canadian football player
- Ted Tully (1930–2003), Canadian linebacker

==== Ice hockey ====
- Ted Brithen (born 1990), Swedish ice hockey player
- Ted Green (1940–2019), Canadian professional ice hockey
- Ted Hampson (born 1936), Canadian former ice hockey player
- Ted Harris (ice hockey) (born 1936), Canadian former professional ice hockey player
- Ted Irvine (born 1944), Canadian former professional NHL hockey player and father of American professional wrestler Chris Jericho
- Ted Kennedy (ice hockey) (1925–2009), Canadian ice hockey player
- Ted Lindsay (1925–2019), Canadian ice hockey player
- Ted Nolan (born 1958), Canadian ice hockey coach and executive

==== Rugby ====
- Ted Glossop (1934–1998), Australian rugby league footballer and coach
- Ted Goodwin (born 1951), Australian rugby league footballer

==== Wrestling ====
- Ted Allen (wrestler) (1955–2010), American professional wrestler
- Ted Arcidi (born 1958/1959), American former professional wrestler, actor, and powerlifter
- Ted Beresford (1910–1990), British professional wrestler and promoter
- Ted DiBiase (born 1954), American retired professional wrestler
- Ted DiBiase Jr. (born 1982), American businessman, actor, and former professional wrestler
- Ted Oats, American professional wrestler

==== Other sports ====
- Ted Arcidi (born 1958/1959), American former professional wrestler, actor, and powerlifter
- Ted Atkinson (1916–2005), Canadian-born American thoroughbred horse racing jockey
- Ted Baker (publican) (1872–1936), South Australian sportsman
- Ted Christopher (1958–2017), American racing driver
- Ted Dexter (1935–2021), English cricketer
- Ted Hampson (sprinter) (1910–1990), Australian athlete
- Ted Hankey (born 1968), English professional darts player
- Ted Hood (1927–2013), American yachtsman and naval architect
- Ted Husing (1901–1962), American sports commentator
- Ted King (cyclist) (born 1983), American cyclist
- Ted "Kid" Lewis (Gershon Mendeloff; 1893–1970), English boxer
- Ted Ryan (rower) (born 1957), Irish rower
- Ted Wilson (footballer) (1855–1???), footballer who played for Stoke

=== Other people ===
- Ted Arison (1924–1999), Israeli businessman
- Ted Bassett (businessman) (1921–2025), American executive
- Ted Brown (activist) (born 1950), British gay rights activist
- Ted Maher (born 1958), American Green Beret turned registered nurse
- Ted Price (died 2004), American murder victim
- Ted N. C. Wilson (born 1950), American president of the General Conference (GC) of the Seventh-day Adventist (SDA) Church

== Fictional characters ==
- Ted, the Generic Guy, in comic strip Dilbert
- Ted and Ralph sketches from the British TV series The Fast Show
- Ted Buckland, from the American TV series Scrubs
- Father Ted Crilly, from the Irish TV sitcom Father Ted
- Ted Grant, in the comic series DC Comics
- Ted Kord, the second Blue Beetle from DC Comics
- Ted Lasso (character), title character from the eponymous television series
- Ted Mosby, from the American TV series How I Met Your Mother
- Ted Schmidt, from the North American TV series Queer as Folk
