= Eddy =

Eddy may refer to:

- Eddy (surname), surname used by descendants of a number of English, Irish and Scottish families
- Eddy (given name), male given name
- Eddy (fluid dynamics), the swirling of a fluid and the reverse current created when the fluid flows past an obstacle
- Eddy current, in electromagnetism, loops of electric current induced within conductors by a changing magnetic field.
- Eddy current brake, a device used to slow or stop a moving object by generating eddy currents and thus dissipating its kinetic energy as heat.
- Eddy (film), a 2015 Italian film
- Eddy & The Soul Band, a 1980s Dutch disco group
- Eddy (Ed, Edd n Eddy), a character on Ed, Edd n Eddy
- Eddy covariance, a statistical method used in meteorology
- Eddy Test, administered by the US Navy and Marine Corps during and after World War II
- Eddy-class tanker, a former British Royal Fleet Auxiliary class

== Places ==
=== United States ===
- Eddy, Alabama, an unincorporated community
- Eddy, Oklahoma, an unincorporated community
- Big Eddy, Kentucky, an unincorporated community
- Eddy County, New Mexico
- Eddy County, North Dakota
- Mount Eddy, California
- Eddy Creek (Kentucky), a stream
- Eddy Creek (Lackawanna River), a stream in Pennsylvania

=== Elsewhere ===
- Eddy Island, Nunavut, Canada
- Island Eddy, in Galway Bay, Ireland
- Eddy Col, Trinity Peninsula, Antarctica
- Eddy Point, King George Island, Antarctica

== See also ==
- Eddie (disambiguation)
- Edy (disambiguation)
