= Ned (given name) =

Ned is an English given name and variant of Ed, sometimes short for Edward, Edmund, Edgar, or Edwin.

== People with the given name Ned, or its variants ==
- Ned Abraham (born 1961), Australian surgeon
- Ted Alley (1881–1949), former Australian rules footballer listed in some sources as Ned Alley
- Nickname of Edward Almond (1892–1979), United States Army general best known as the commander of the Army's X Corps during the Korean War
- Ned Ambler (born 1968 or 1969), American photographer and talent scout
- Ned Austin (1925–2007), American actor
- Ned Azemia (born 1997), Seychellois hurdler
- Ned Barkas (1901–1962), English professional footballer
- Ned Beatty (1937–2021), American actor
- Ned Bellamy (born 1957), American actor
- Ned Benson (born 1977), American filmmaker
- Ned Bittinger (born 1951), American artist
- Ned Block (born 1942), American philosopher
- Ned Bouhalassa (born 1962), Canadian composer
- Ned Boulting (born 1969), British sports journalist and television presenter
- Ned Buntline (1821 or 1823–1886), American publisher, journalist, writer, and publicist
- Ned Cameron (born 1987), American singer, songwriter, and record producer
- Ned Catic (born 1978), Australian rugby league footballer
- Ned Chaillet (born 1944), American-born British radio drama producer and director, writer and journalist
- Ned Cobb (1885–1973), American tenant farmer
- Ned Collette (born 1979), Australian musician and singer-songwriter
- Ned Crotty (born 1986), American lacrosse player
- Ned Cuthbert (1845–1905), American baseball player
- Ned Daly (1891–1916), Dublin's 1st battalion commandant during the 1916 Easter Rising
- Ned Dameron, American science fiction and fantasy artist
- Ned Davis (1886–1961), Australian politician
- Ned Day (1945–1987), American television journalist
- Ned Dennehy (born 1965), Irish actor
- Ned Donaghy, American soccer referee active in the 1920s and 1930s
- Ned Dowd (born 1950), American film producer and former actor
- Ned Eckersley (born 1989), English cricketer
- Ned Eisenberg (1957–2022), American actor
- Ned Endress (1918–2010), American basketball player
- Ned Evett (born 1967), American guitarist, singer, and songwriter
- Ned Fairchild (1929–2015), American songwriter
- Ned Freed (born 1959), American software developer
- Ned Garver (1925–2017), American baseball pitcher
- Ned Glass (1906–1984), American character actor
- Ned Goldreyer, American television writer, television producer and comedian
- Ned Gregory (1839–1899), Australian cricketer
- Ned Hanlan (1855–1908), Canadian professional sculler, hotelier and alderman
- Ned Harris (1916–1976), American baseball player
- Ned Herrmann (1922–1999), creator of the Herrmann Brain Dominance Instrument
- Ned Hollister (1876–1924), American biologist
- Ned Irish (1905–1982), American basketball promoter
- Ned Jarrett (1932–2026), American race car driver
- Ned Jenkins (1904–1990), Welsh rugby union player
- Ned Kelly (1850s–1880), Australian outlaw and folk hero
- Ned Lamont (born 1954), American businessman and politician, 89th Governor of Connecticut
- Nickname of Edwin Gray Lee (1836-1870), a Confederate brigadier general and American lawyer who was a cousin once removed of the famous Robert E. Lee
- Ned Luke (born 1958), American actor
- Ned Maddrell (1877–1974), Manx fisherman
- Ned Markosian, American philosopher
- Ned Martel, American television writer and producer
- Ned Martin (1923–2002), American sportscaster
- Ned McGowan (lawyer) (1813–1893), American lawyer and politician
- Ned McHenry (born 2000), Australian rules footballer
- Ned McWherter (1930–2011), American politician
- Ned Merriam (1884–1956), American track athlete, football player, and coach
- Ned Mettam (1868–1943), English footballer
- Ned Miller (1925–2016), American country music singer-songwriter
- Ned O'Connor (1877–1956), Australian rules footballer
- Ned Officer (1869–1927), Australian rules footballer
- Ned O'Gorman (1929–2014), American poet and educator
- Ned O'Keeffe (born 1942), Irish politician
- Ned O'Sullivan (born 1950), Irish politician
- Ned Palmer, British cheesemonger and author
- Ned Price (born 1982), American Spokesperson for the United States Department of State
- Ned Rorem (1923–2022), American composer and writer
- Ned Scott (1907–1967), American photographer who worked in the Hollywood film industry
- Ned Sherrin (1931–2007), British impresario, writer, game show host and raconteur
- Ned Sparks (1883–1957), Canadian character actor
- Ned Sublette (born 1951), American composer, musician, record producer, musicologist, and author
- Ned Vizzini (1981–2013), American writer
- Ned Yost (born 1955), American baseball player and manager

== Fictional characters ==
- Ned Banks, a character from the Ghost Whisperer
- Ned Bigby, the main protagonist of Ned's Declassified School Survival Guide
- Ned Devine, deceased character from Waking Ned Devine (1998)
- Ned Dorneget, a Cyber Division Special Agent in the police series NCIS
- Ned Flanders, a character from The Simpsons
- Ned Flemkin, the titular character from the Canadian animated television series Ned's Newt
- Ned Gerblansky, a character and Jimbo Kern's friend from South Park
- Ned Quartermaine, a character from the soap opera General Hospital
- Ned Dorsey, one of the two main characters from the television series Ned and Stacey
- Ned Land, a character from the 1870 adventure novel Twenty Thousand Leagues Under the Seas
- Ned Leeds, a character in Marvel Comics
- Ned Merrill, a character from the 1964 short story "The Swimmer"
- Ned Nederlander, one of the three protagonists in the 1986 western comedy Three Amigos
- Ned Needlemeyer, the titular character from the short-lived 1997 animated series Nightmare Ned
- Ned Nickerson, the boyfriend of Nancy Drew in the novels of the same name
- Ned Plimpton, a character from the 2004 film The Life Aquatic with Steve Zissou
- Ned Racine, a character from the 1981 film Body Heat
- Ned Ryder, a character from the 1945 novel Brideshead Revisited
- Ned Ryerson, a character from the 1993 comedy Groundhog Day
- Ned Schneebly, a character from the 2003 comedy School of Rock
- Ned Stark, a character from the A Song of Ice and Fire series
- Ned, the main character from the television series Pushing Daisies
- Ned, a character from the television series The Tribe
- Ned, the titular host of talk show set in outer space, Earth to Ned
- Ned, the wombat in The Koala Brothers
- Ned, a creature in the music video for "Chlorine", a song by the band Twenty One Pilots
- Ned, short for Nedwin, a character from the 2011 fantasy novel Beyonders: A World Without Heroes
