= Eddie =

Eddie may refer to:

- Eddie (text editor), a text editor originally for BeOS and now ported to Linux and Mac OS X
- Eddie (crater), a crater on Mars
- Eddie (given name)
- The Eddie, a surfing tournament

== Arts and entertainment ==
- Eddie (film), a 1996 film about basketball starring Whoopi Goldberg
  - Eddie (soundtrack), the soundtrack to the film
- "Eddie" (Louie), a 2011 episode of the show Louie
- Eddie (shipboard computer), in The Hitchhiker's Guide to the Galaxy
- Eddie (Iron Maiden), the mascot for the British heavy metal band Iron Maiden
- Eddie, an American Cinema Editors award for best editing
- Eddie (book series), a book series by Viveca Lärn
- Half of the musical duo Flo & Eddie
- "Eddie", a song from the Rocky Horror Picture Show
- "Eddie" (song), a 2022 song by the Red Hot Chili Peppers

== See also ==
- Edie (disambiguation)
- Edy (disambiguation)
- Eddy (disambiguation)
