= Ed Price =

Ed or Eddie Price may refer to:

- Ed Price (American football) (1909–1976), American multi-sport player and football coach in Texas
- Ed Price (Canadian politician)
- Ed Price (Florida politician) (1918–2012), Florida legislator
- Ed Price (Louisiana politician), member of the Louisiana State Legislature
- Eddie Price (1925–1979), American football player and inductee to the College Football Hall of Fame; father of Eddie Price III
- Eddie Price III (born 1952), American politician and former mayor of Mandeville, Louisiana

== See also ==
- Edward Price (disambiguation)
- Edwin Price (disambiguation)
