= Eddie Jenkins =

Eddie Jenkins may refer to:

- Eddie Jenkins (footballer, born 1895), Welsh footballer
- Eddie Jenkins (footballer, born 1909), Welsh footballer (d. 2005)
- Eddie Jenkins, keyboardist and pianist for the Streets

== See also ==
- Edward Jenkins (disambiguation)
- Ed Jenkins (disambiguation)
