= Eduardo Rodríguez =

Eddy, Eddie or Eduardo Rodríguez may refer to:

== Entertainment industry figures ==
- Eddie Rodriguez (1932–2001), Filipino actor and director
- Eduardo Rodríguez (born 1945), Spanish guitarist and singer, co-founder of Triana (band)
- Eduardo Rodríguez (director), Venezuelan film director and producer since 2002

== Public officials ==
- Eduardo Rodríguez Larreta (1888–1973), Uruguayan journalist and politician
- Eduardo Rodríguez Mazer (1902–1969), Chilean lawyer and politician
- Eduardo Rodríguez Veltzé (born 1956), Bolivian president in 2005
- Eddie Rodriguez (politician) (born 1971), American legislator in Texas
- Ed Rodriguez (New Jersey politician)
- Eduardo Delgado Rodríguez (before 1950–2017), Cuban general and director of espionage

== Sportsmen ==
=== Association football (soccer) ===
- Eduardo Rodríguez (Spanish footballer) (born 1966), Spanish footballer
- Eddie Rodriguez (soccer) (born 1970), Mexican-born American midfielder and coach
- Luis Eduardo Rodríguez (born 1991), Mexican footballer
- Eduardo Rodríguez (Argentine footballer), Argentine footballer

=== Baseball ===
- Eduardo Rodríguez (right-handed pitcher) (1952–2009), Puerto Rican baseball player
- Eddie Rodríguez (born 1959), Cuban-born American baseball player and coach
- Eddy Rodríguez (pitcher) (born 1981), Dominican baseball player
- Eddy Rodríguez (catcher) (born 1985), Cuban baseball player
- Eduardo Rodríguez (left-handed pitcher) (born 1993), Venezuelan baseball player

=== Other sports ===
- Eduardo Rodríguez (volleyball) (born 1971), Argentine volleyball player
- Eduardo Iván Rodríguez (born 1978), Spanish hurdler

== See also ==
- Edie Rodriguez, American businesswoman and travel industry executive
- Edwin Rodríguez (disambiguation)
