= Edie (disambiguation) =

Edie is a feminine given name, as well as a surname.

Edie may also refer to:

- Edie (film), a 2017 British drama film
- Edie, Pennsylvania, United States, a census-designated place
- "Edie (Ciao Baby)", a 1989 song by the Cult on their album Sonic Temple

== See also ==
- Eddie (disambiguation)
- Edy (disambiguation)
