= Edey =

Edey is a surname. Notable people with the surname include:

- Cec Edey (born 1965), British footballer
- Moses Chamberlain Edey (1845–1919), Canadian architect
- Tim Edey, British multi-instrumentalist and composer
- Tyler Edey (born 1980), Canadian pocket billiards player
- Winthrop Kellogg Edey (1938–1999), American collector and horologist
- Zach Edey (born 2002), Canadian basketball player

== See also ==
- Edie (name), given name and surname
- Eady, surname
