= Big Eddy =

Big Eddy may refer to:

- Big Eddy, Kentucky, a community in Franklin County, Kentucky
- Big Eddy Site, an archaeological site in Cedar County, Missouri
- Big Eddy, Alberta, a specialized municipality

== See also ==
- Big Ed (disambiguation)
