= Pizza My Heart =

Pizza My Heart may refer to:

- Pizza My Heart (film), a 2005 television film
- Pizza My Heart (restaurant), a chain of pizza restaurants in Northern California
