= Broken Rainbow =

Broken Rainbow may refer to:

- Broken Rainbow (film), a 1985 documentary film about the forced relocation of members of the Navajo tribe
- Broken Rainbow (organisation), a UK organization for victims of same-sex domestic violence
