= Deady =

Deady is a surname. Notable people with the surname include:

- Mark Deady (born 1967), American middle-distance runner
- Matthew Deady (1824–1893), American politician and jurist
- Moira Deady (1922–2010), Irish actress

== See also ==
- Eady
