= Edward Lee =

Edward Lee may refer to:

- Edward Lee (basketball) (1925–1988), Chinese Olympic basketball player
- Edward Lee (writer) (born 1957), American horror writer
- Edward Lee (bishop) (1482–1544), archbishop of York, 1531–1544
- Edward Lewis Lee Jr. (born 1934), American Episcopal bishop
- Edward Merwin Lee (1835–1913), Union officer during the American Civil War
- Edward Lee, 1st Earl of Lichfield (1663–1716), English peer
- Edward Edson Lee (1884–1944), American children's literature author
- Edward Lee (billiards player) (1905–1969), American professional carom billiards player
- Edward Lee (footballer), early 20th century English association footballer
- Edward Lee (scientist) (1914–2001), British scientist, inventor, and civil servant
- Edward Graham Lee (born 1931), former Canadian ambassador to Israel
- Edward Lee (politician) (1822–1883), New Zealand politician
- Edward Lee (cricketer) (1877–1942), English cricketer
- Edward Lee (chef), American chef
- Edward A. Lee (born 1957), Puerto Rican computer scientist, electrical engineer, and author
- Edward Lee Poh Lin (1949–2011), Malaysian politician
- Eddie Lee (baseball) (Edward Lee), American Negro league outfielder
- Ted Lee (footballer) (Edward Botterill Lee 1857-1930), English footballer, see 1879–80 Aston Villa F.C. season

== See also ==
- Edward Leigh (disambiguation)
- Edward Lea (1837–1863), U.S. Naval officer
- Eddie Li, Hong Kong actor and model
- Ed Lee (disambiguation)
