= Simple Simon (nursery rhyme) =

Nursery rhyme

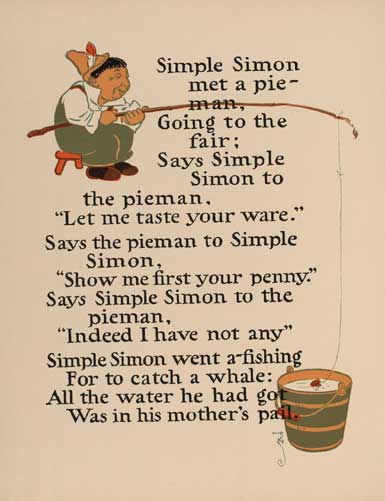
- William Wallace Denslow's illustrations for Simple Simon, from a 1901 edition of Mother Goose

Nursery rhyme
- Published: 1764
- Songwriter: Traditional

"Simple Simon" is an English-language nursery rhyme. It has a Roud Folk Song Index number of 19777.

The nursery rhyme is about a foolish or naive boy named Simon who does not understand basic common sense situations. In the rhyme, Simon tries to interact with various people, like asking a pieman (a man selling pies) for a pie without having any money, or doing other silly things that show his lack of understanding. The rhyme is meant to be humorous, showing Simon's simplicity and childish foolishness.

It is often interpreted as a light-hearted way to teach children about manners, common sense, and the importance of thinking before acting.

== Text ==
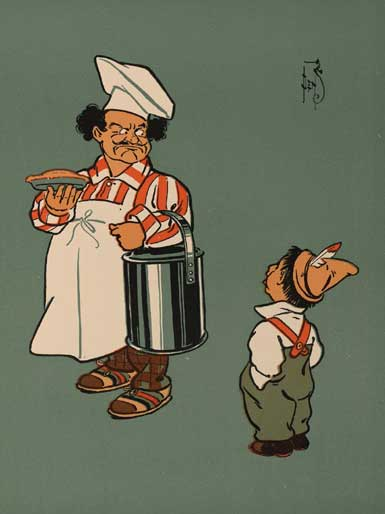
Denslow illustration of Simple Simon and the pie man

The rhyme is as follows;

Simple Simon met a pieman,
Going to the fair;
Says Simple Simon to the pieman,
Let me taste your ware.

Said the pieman to Simple Simon,
Show me first your penny;
Says Simple Simon to the pieman,
Sir I haven't any.

Simple Simon went a-fishing,
For to catch a whale;
All the water he had got,
Was in his mother's pail.

Simple Simon went to look
If plums grew on a thistle;
He pricked his fingers very much,
Which made poor Simon whistle.

== Origin ==
The verses used today are the first of a longer chapbook history first published in 1764. The character of Simple Simon may have been in circulation much longer, possibly through an Elizabethan chapbook and in a ballad, Simple Simon's Misfortunes and his Wife Margery's Cruelty, from about 1685. A possible inspiration is Simon Edy, a beggar of the St Giles area in the 18th century.
