= Edward Leigh (disambiguation) =

Edward Leigh (born 1950) is a British Conservative Party politician.

Edward Leigh may also refer to:

- Edward Leigh (writer) (1602–1671), known for his works on religious topics, and Member of the Long Parliament
- Edward Chandos Leigh (1832–1915), British cricketer and barrister
- Edward Leigh (cricketer, born 1913) (1913–1994), English cricketer
- Edward Leigh, 5th Baron Leigh (1742–1786)
- Ed Leigh (born 1975), British television presenter

== See also ==
- Edward Lee (disambiguation)
- Edward Lea (1837–1863), U.S. naval officer
