= Galop (charity) =

UK LGBT anti-abuse charity

- Formation: 1982
- Location: London, United Kingdom
- CEO: Ben Kernighan and Jasmine O'Connor
- Expenses: £2,184,336 (2022)
- Website: galop.org.uk
- Formerly called: Gay London Police Monitoring Group

Galop is an LGBT anti-abuse charity and police monitoring group in the United Kingdom that campaigns against domestic abuse, conversion therapy, sexual violence, hate crime, and other forms of discrimination against LGBT people. It runs four national helplines for LGBT survivors of rape and sexual abuse, conversion therapy, domestic abuse and hate crime, and supports LGBT people who have problems with the police or questions about the UK criminal justice system.

== History ==
=== 1982–1999 ===
Galop was established in 1982 as the Gay London Police Monitoring Group to oppose homophobia in the Metropolitan Police. In 1985, the Lesbians and Policing Project (Lespop), specifically for support to lesbians, was developed from Galop, in operation until 1990. The black section of the charity was headed by Ted Brown, who left after a confrontation with a white gay man in the organisation who used a racial slur.

In 1987, it published issue 2 of The Galop Bulletin newsletter, covering a police raid on the Royal Vauxhall Tavern in which police wore "space suits" and rubber gloves for fear of catching AIDS.

In 1993, Galop spokesman Paul Duffy criticised the police for failing to solve the murders of over 60 homosexual men. In a survey, it found that at least 40% of gay men and 25% of lesbians had been attacked because of their sexuality. It organised a Violence, Sexuality and Equality conference, aiming to improve the relationship between police and the gay community in London.

=== 2000–2020 ===
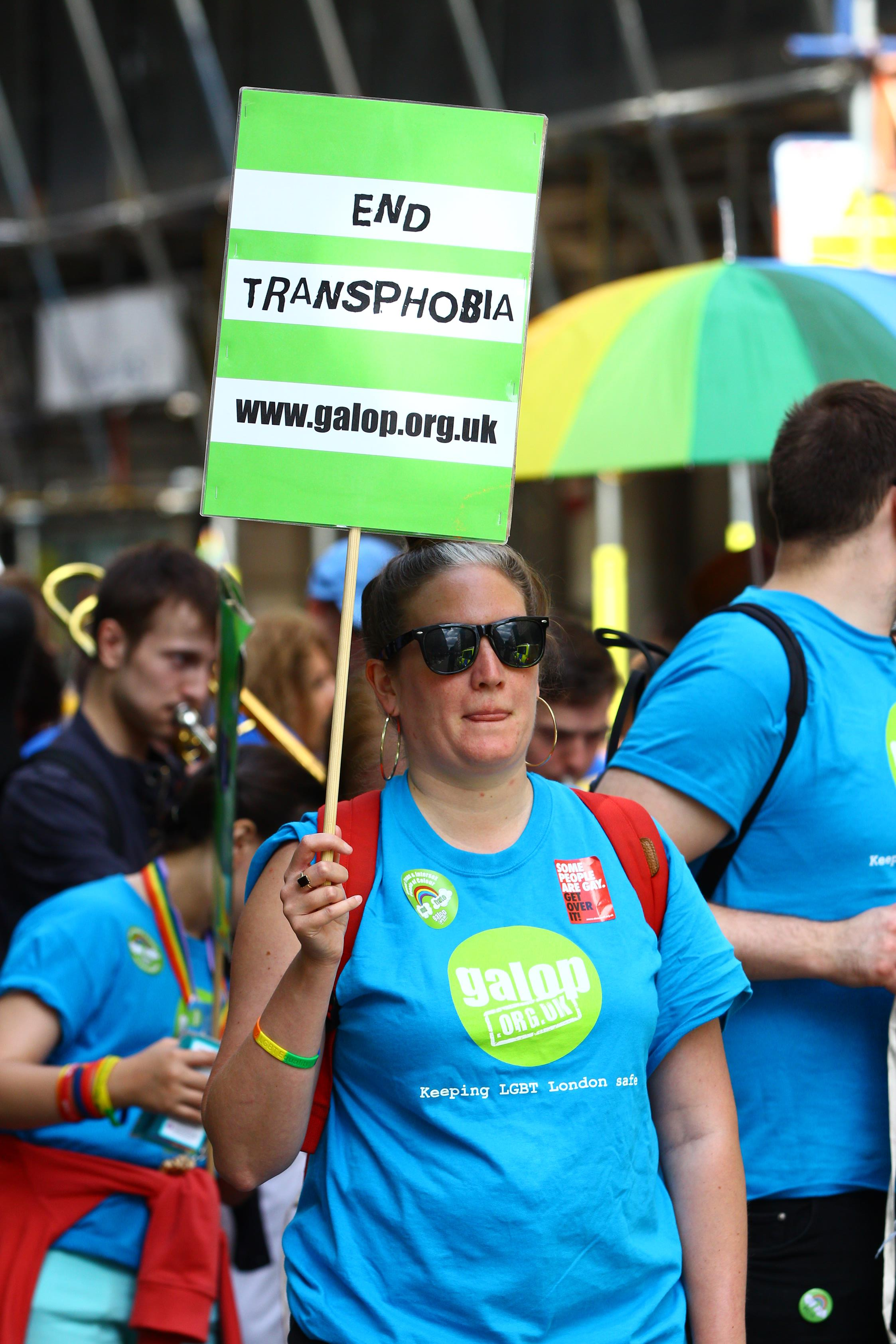
Galop marching at Pride in London 2015

Alongside the Jewish hotline Community Service Trust and Muslim hotline Tell MAMA, Galop opposed Mayor of London Boris Johnson's proposal of a hate crime hotline in 2015, stating it would dilute community trust in existing hotlines and discourage reporting.

In October 2016, Galop reported that hate crimes against LGBT people increased 147% during July, August and September 2016, the three months following the Brexit referendum, compared to the same period in 2017; a proportionately higher rise than other hate crimes in that period. It stated it had given support to 187 LGBT people in the 2016 period, compared with 72 in the same period in 2015. Galop also noted it had registered a number of explicitly Brexit related attacks against visibly LGBT people during these months. That year, it surveyed 467 LGBT people and found that around 20% of respondents said they had experienced hate crime, but that half of those who reported a hate crime to the police felt unsatisfied with the outcome. Galop's chief executive at the time Nik Noone said that "UK responses to hate crime are among the best in the world but our hate crime laws are far from perfect." The London Gay Men's Chorus released a cover of "Bridge Over Troubled Water" for victims of the Orlando nightclub shooting in June, raising money for the Pulse Victims Fund and Galop.

In 2016, when Broken Rainbow, an LGBT charity that operated a domestic violence helpline, collapsed, Galop took on responsibility of the helpline's services.

In October 2019, Galop published research through The Independent that 27% of those aged 18 to 24 thought LGBT people were "immoral" or that homosexuality contravened their beliefs, compared to 20% across all age groups, and that respondents under 25 were more polarised than their older counterparts. It attributed the change to "the influence of the rise of anti-LGBT+ rhetoric globally," and "a growing number of siloed online communities of hate, which exist with different social norms to mainstream society."

=== 2020–present ===
Galop launched its National Conversion Therapy Helpline in October 2021, financed through crowdfunding, and welcomed government plans to ban the practice in England and Wales, though expressed concerns that the consultation and debate surrounding the ban "may prove traumatising for victims and survivors". In May 2022 it was announced that the UK government would fund Galop with over £300,000 to run the helpline for three years, expanding it to include a live chat function and information service in addition to its already existing phone and email support.

In 2022, Galop commissioned a YouGov survey of over 5,000 people in February that year; it found that nearly a third of LGBT people had experienced abuse from a relative, including verbal harassment and threats of homelessness and physical violence. This increased to 43% for transgender and non-binary respondents. 60% of those who had experienced this abuse said their LGBT identity was either the main reason or part of the reason for the abuse. 63% were under 18 when they first experienced abuse from their family, and 30% were under 11 years old. 5% of LGBT people had experienced conversion practices driven by family members, including attempts to change, "cure" or suppress their sexual orientation or gender identity, which increased to 11% for transgender and non-binary people. It thus recommended long-term dedicated funding for specialist services to support LGBT abuse survivors. It reported in November that transgender people avoided reporting incidents out of fear they would be subject to discrimination including misgendering and deadnaming. Galop recorded a 19% increase in demand for its hate crime support services in the last six months of 2022, which it attributed to a "hostile public narrative" resulting from controversies such as the Isla Bryson case.

In January 2023, Galop released polling that one in five LGBT people and over a third of transgender people in the UK had been subjected to attempted conversion therapy. For Valentines Day that year, it partnered with cosmetics company Lush in a 'Have a Heart' initiative, encouraging customers to send e-cards to their members of parliament telling them to prohibit conversion practices. Lush also released limited edition heart-shaped washcards, all sales of which went to Galop.
