= Edwin Price =

Edwin Price may refer to:

- Ed Price (American football) (Edwin Booth Price; 1909–1976), American multi-sport player and football coach in Texas
- Edwin Price (priest) (1846–1914), British Anglican priest
- Edwin M. Price (1884–1957), American architect
- Edwin Williamson Price (c. 1834 – 1908), Confederate States Army officer

== See also ==
- Ed Price (disambiguation)
- Edward Price (disambiguation)
