= Edy (disambiguation) =

Edy, provided by Rakuten, Inc. in Japan is a prepaid rechargeable contactless smart card.

Edy or EDY may also refer to:

== People ==
- Edy Paul
- Simon Edy
- John William Edy

== Other uses ==
- EDY or East Didsbury railway station, Manchester, England (National Rail station code)
- Edy, a 2005 film by Stéphan Guérin-Tillié
- Edy's, the brand name used for Dreyer's ice cream in the eastern United States.

== See also ==
- Eddy (disambiguation)
- Edie (disambiguation)
