= Edward Prime (disambiguation) =

Edward Prime may refer to:

- Edward Prime (1801–1883), American banker
- Edward Dorr Griffin Prime (1814–1891), American clergyman and journalist
- Edward Irenaeus Prime-Stevenson (1858–1942), American novelist

== See also ==
- Edward Price (disambiguation)
