= California Pizza Kitchen =

American restaurant chain

California Pizza Kitchen, Inc.
- Type: Private
- Traded as: Nasdaq: CPKI
- Industry: Food and beverage
- Genre: American Cuisine
- Founded: 1985; 41 years ago
- Founders: Rick Rosenfield; Larry Flax
- Headquarters: Costa Mesa, California, United States
- Number of locations: 184 (As of May 9, 2023)
- Area served: United States (incl. Guam), Costa Rica, Chile, China, Hong Kong, Indonesia, Mexico, Philippines, South Korea
- Key people: Jeff Warne (CEO)
- Products: Pizzas, pastas, salads, small plates, and desserts
- Services: Polished casual dining restaurant
- Number of employees: 14,000
- Subsidiaries: CPK ASAP
- Website: www.cpk.com

California Pizza Kitchen, Inc. (CPK) is an American casual dining restaurant chain that specializes in California-style pizza. The restaurant was started in 1985 by attorneys Rick Rosenfield and Larry Flax in Beverly Hills, California, United States. California Pizza Kitchen introduced and popularized BBQ Chicken Pizza.

== Description ==
California Pizza Kitchen locations
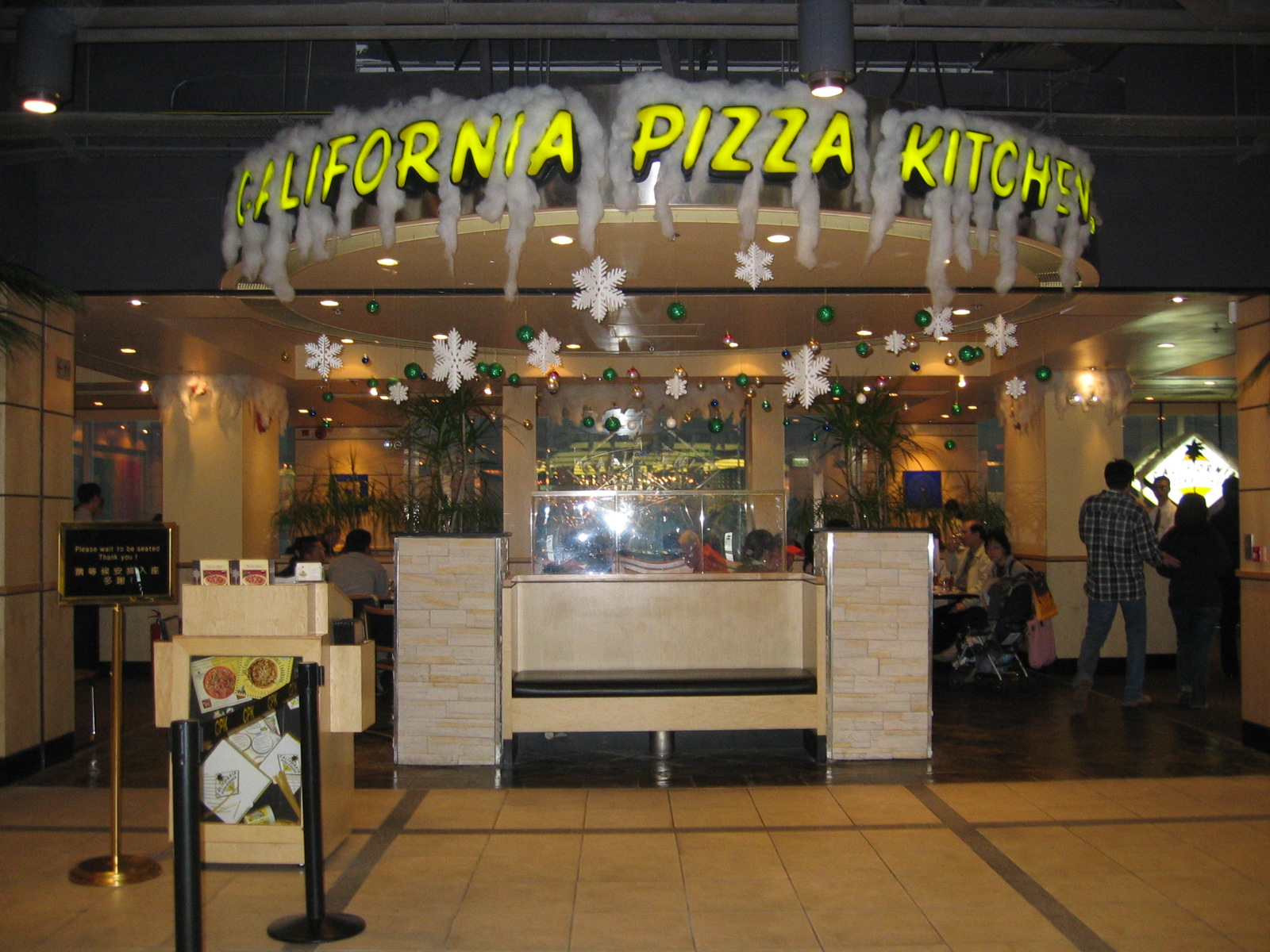
The Ocean Terminal, Hong Kong location at Christmastime

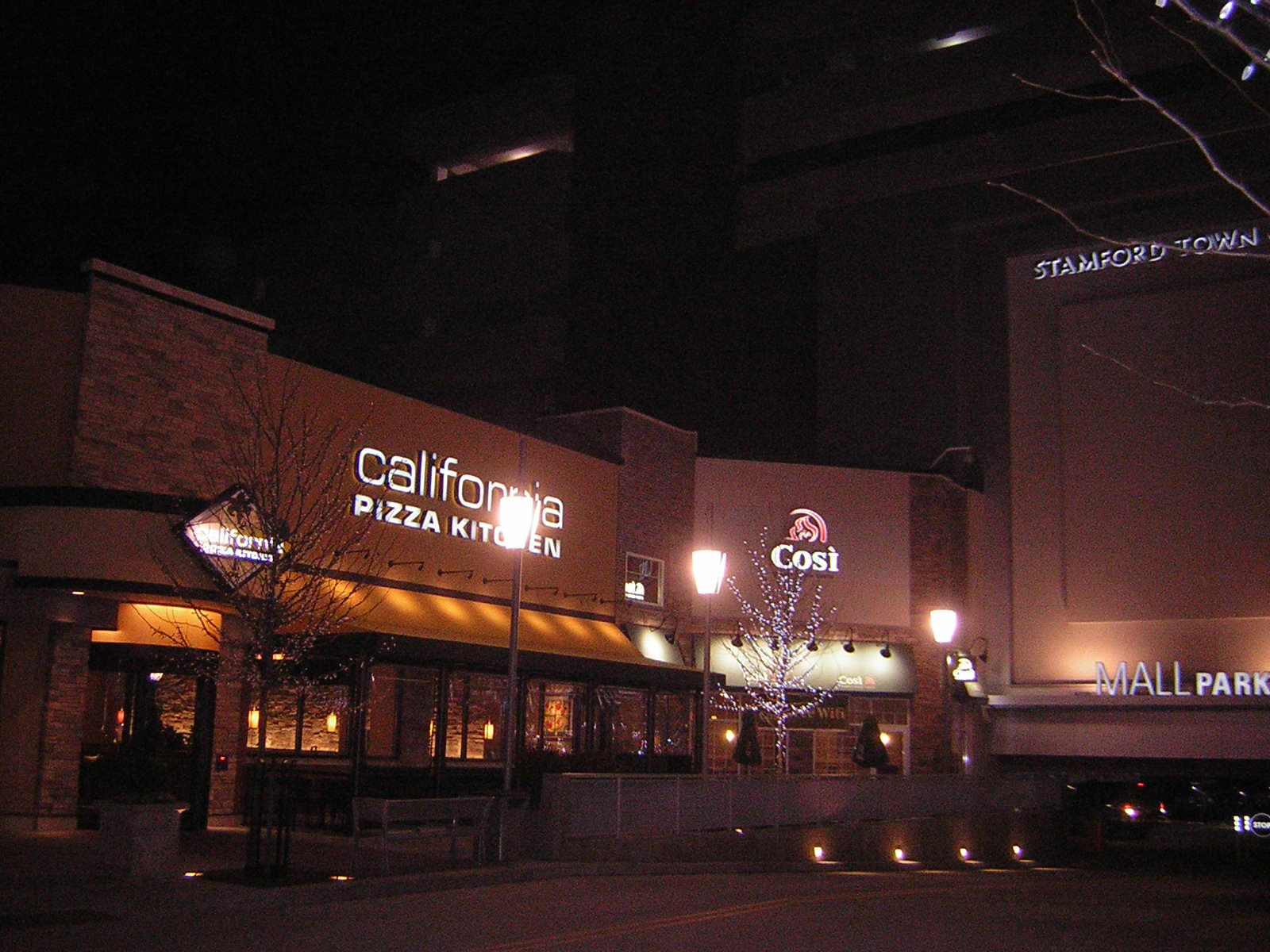
A new California Pizza Kitchen in Stamford, Connecticut

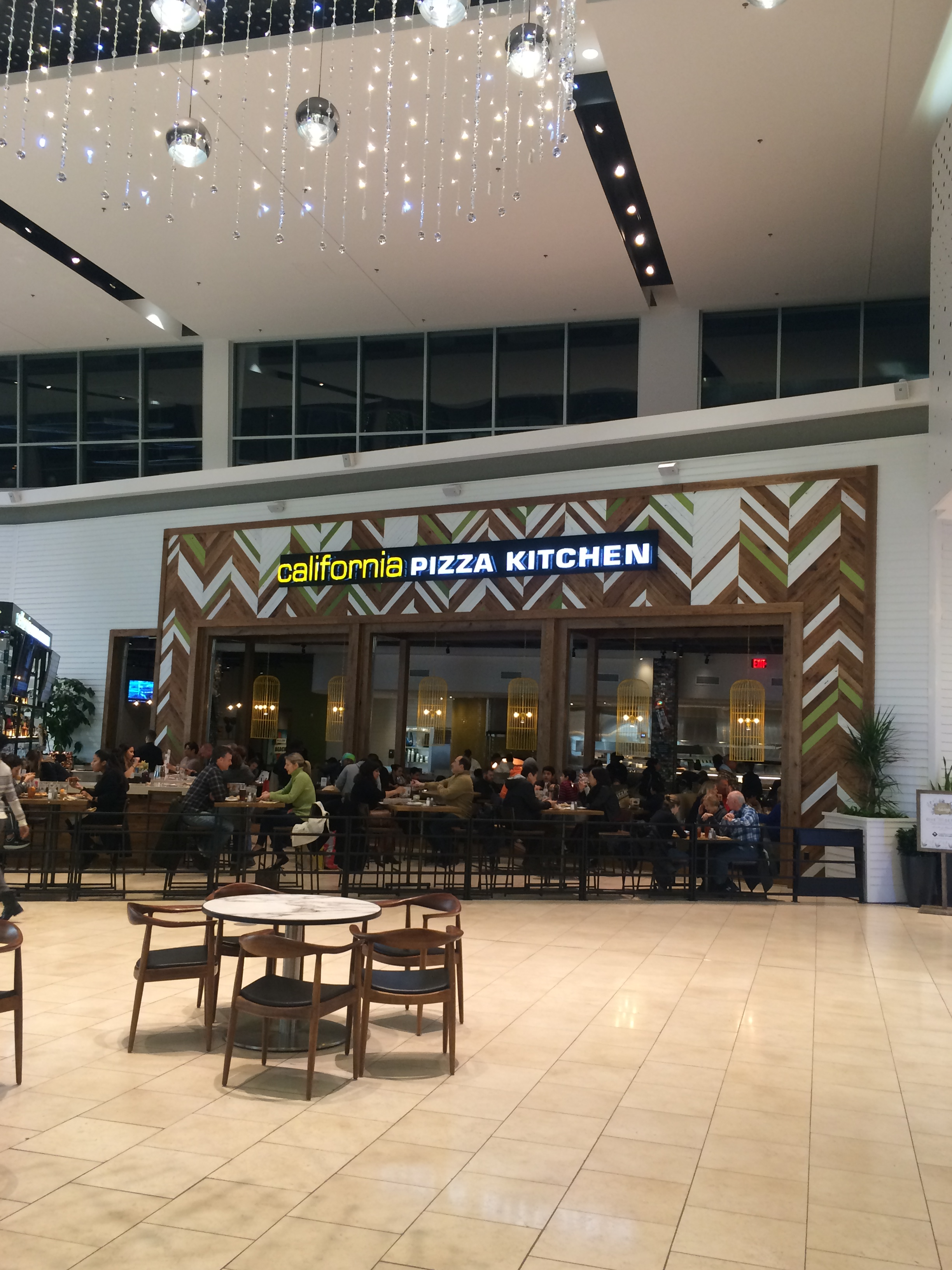
A California Pizza Kitchen location at Westfield Garden State Plaza in Paramus, New Jersey

The chain has over 185 locations in 32 U.S. states and 10 other countries, including 15 California Pizza Kitchen nontraditional, franchise concepts designed for airports, universities, and stadiums.

CPK's brand is licensed to a line of hand-tossed style, crispy thin crust, gluten-free crust, and small frozen pizzas for sale in supermarkets. The brand was originally licensed to Kraft in 1999. The license was assigned to Nestlé after it purchased Kraft's pizza lines in 2010.

== History ==
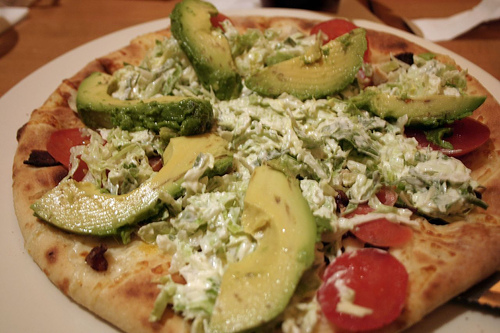
A California Club pizza from CPK

In 1985, Flax and Rosenfield pooled $200,000 in bank loans and savings along with $350,000 invested from friends to lease space on Beverly Drive in Beverly Hills, California. The first menu, including the famous BBQ Chicken Pizza, was developed by Ed LaDou, then the pizza chef at Wolfgang Puck's Spago restaurant. The very first customer at CPK was actress Shirley MacLaine. Amongst the employees at the original location was chef Suzanne Goin, who worked there the summer of 1985, while she was home from her first year at college. CPK became an immediate success, and the company expanded throughout Southern California. By 1992, there were 26 CPKs.

Flax and Rosenfield served as co-CEO and co-chairmen of CPK from 1985 through to 1996.

In 1992, PepsiCo paid nearly $100 million for 67% of the chain, with Flax and Rosenfield each receiving $17.5 million. At the time, this was thought to be more than CPK was worth, and PepsiCo pushed to expand faster. CPK opened 15 stores in 1993, and then 28 more in the following year. This rapid expansion plan was a disaster. PepsiCo had invested tens of millions of dollars and quickly slowed expansion, and moved to cut costs. PepsiCo executives had started cutting corners by replacing fresh ingredients with frozen vegetables and cheese, a change Flax and Rosenfield later reversed.

In 1997, the private equity firm Bruckmann, Rosser, Sherrill & Company bought out PepsiCo's two-thirds stake with the intention of taking CPK public in 2000, pushing for expansion to resume. Veteran restaurant executive Fred Hipp was hired to run CPK with an aggressive expansion plan, including 18 new stores in 2002, 22 in 2003, and 28 in 2004. The expansion was to be carried out by former Brinker International Vice President Tom Jenneman, under the title of chief development officer. Flax and Rosenfield remained on the board, but had no day-to-day control.

In early 2003, CPK reported a 16% increase in profits, with Hipp telling analysts that CPK was in excellent financial condition. In a March 25, 2003, press release, CPK cut its first-quarter earnings estimates, which were not consistent with the forecast made just a few weeks earlier. Rosenfield investigated the numbers and discovered the positive earnings numbers Hipp had been touting were masking difficult quarters ahead. An emergency board meeting was called, Hipp and Jenneman were fired, and Flax and Rosenfield resumed control of CPK.

Flax and Rosenfield served as co-CEO and co-chairmen of CPK from 2003 to 2011. In 2011, CPK was acquired by an affiliate of private equity firm Golden Gate Capital, and G. J. Hart was named president, chief executive officer, and executive chairman.

In 2013, CPK started serving Gluten Intolerance Group (GIG) certified gluten-free pizzas, available across all CPK locations, excluding franchise locations.

In 2014, CPK started rolling out their "Next Chapter" locations, with modernized interiors and updated menus.

In 2018, CPK added Cauliflower Pizza Crust to its menu nationwide.

In July 2020, CPK filed for bankruptcy due to the COVID-19 pandemic. Owner Golden Gate Capital LP had acquired the company in 2011 and lost 100% of its investment. In October 2020, the sale of the company's assets was cancelled because no party submitted a qualified bid by the sale deadline. The company emerged from bankruptcy in November 2020, with significantly less debt, and hired a new CFO, Judd Tirnauer. In mid-2021, it reportedly hired advisors to refinance its remaining $177 million debt, which would put it in a better position for either a sale or an IPO.

CPK was acquired in November 2025 by a consortium led by Consortium Brand Partners and Eldridge Industries for under $300 million.

== Countries of operation ==
- Canada
- China (Hong Kong)
- Costa Rica
- Guam
- Japan
- Mexico
- Philippines
- South Korea
- United States

== See also ==
- List of pizza chains of the United States
