= Eddie the Eagle (disambiguation) =

Eddie the Eagle (born 1963) is a British ski jumper.

Eddie the Eagle or Eddie Eagle may also refer to:

- Ed Belfour (born 1965), Canadian ice hockey goalie nicknamed "Eddie the Eagle"
- Eddie Eagle, the NRA's gun safety mascot
- Eddie the Eagle, the mascot of Colchester United F.C.
- Eddie the Eagle, the mascot of North Carolina Central University
- Eddie the Eagle (film), a 2016 biopic film about "Eddie" Edwards starring Taron Egerton
