= Ned Palmer =

British cheesemonger

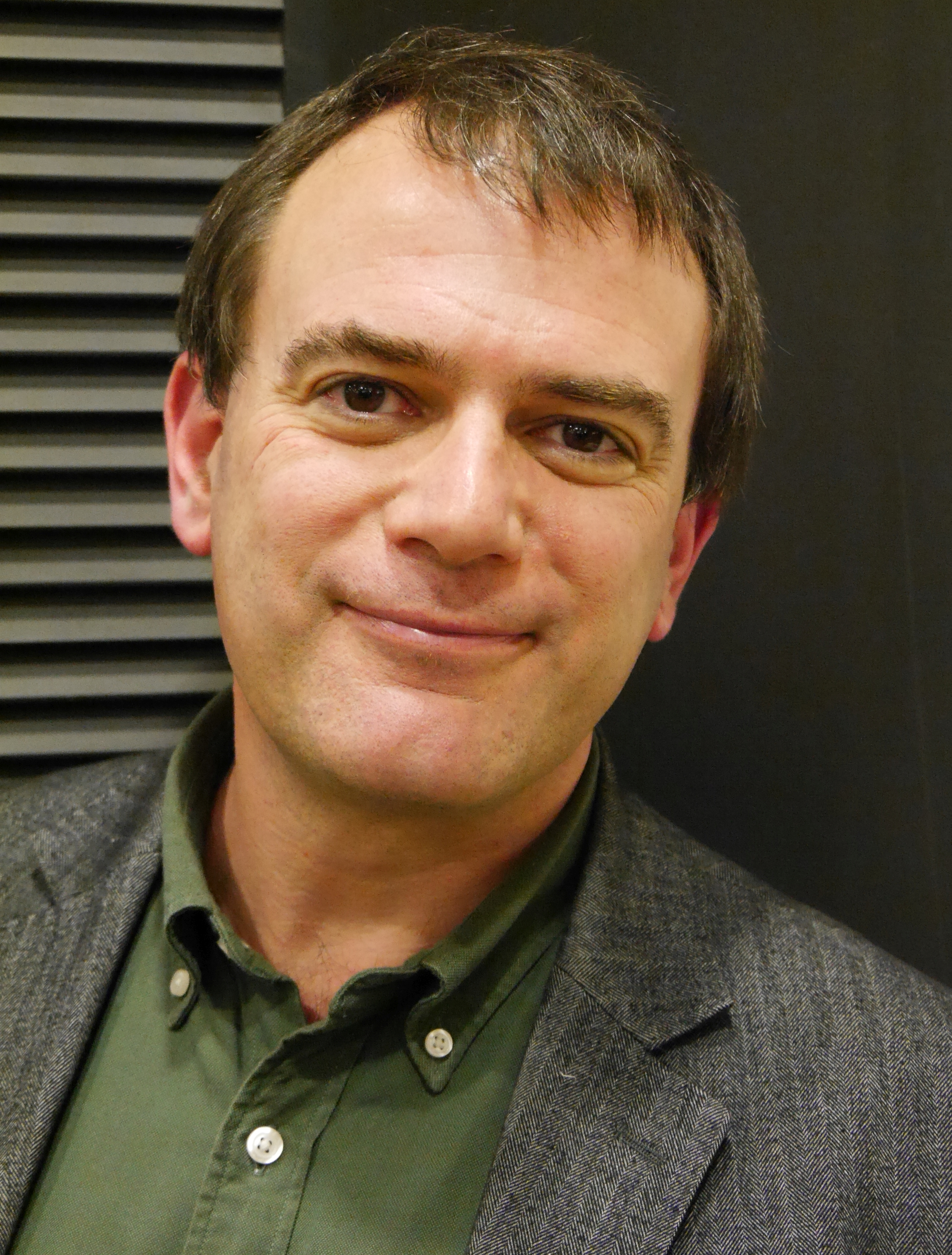
Ned Palmer, Waterstones, London, 2019

Ned Palmer is a British cheesemonger and author, and a former jazz pianist. He has worked as an affineur for Neal's Yard Dairy.

In 2019, Palmer's first book was published, A Cheesemonger's History of the British Isles, and the Times Literary Supplement called him "profoundly knowledgeable about his subject".

In 2021, Palmer's second book was published, A Cheesemonger's Compendium of British and Irish Cheese. A Cheesemonger's Tour de France was published in 2024.

== Publications ==
- A Cheesemonger's History of the British Isles, Profile, 2019
- A Cheesemonger's Compendium of British and Irish Cheese, Profile, 2021
- A Cheesemonger's Tour de France, Profile, 2024
