= Edie =

Edie is a feminine given name, often a diminutive form (hypocorism) of Edith, as well as a surname. It may refer to:

== People ==
=== Given name ===
- Edie Adams (1927–2008), American businesswoman, singer, actress and comedian
- Edie Boyer (born 1966), American retired discus thrower
- Edie Brickell (born 1966), American singer/songwriter and guitarist.
- Edie Campbell (born 1990), English model
- Edie Fake (born 1980), American artist and author
- Edie Falco (born 1963), American actress
- Edie Huggins (1935–2008), American television reporter, journalist and broadcaster
- Edie McClurg (born 1945), American stand-up comedian, actress, singer and voice actress
- Edie Meidav, 21st century Canadian-born American novelist
- Edie Parker (1922–1993), American memoirist, first wife of Jack Kerouac
- Edie Sedgwick (1943–1971), American heiress, socialite, actress and fashion model
- Edith Vonnegut (born 1949), American painter, daughter of author Kurt Vonnegut and former wife of Geraldo Rivera
- Edith Windsor (1929–2017), American lesbian, gay, bisexual and transgender rights activist, lead plaintiff in the US Supreme Court case United States v. Windsor

=== Surname ===
- James M. Edie (1927–1998), American philosopher
- John Edie (New Zealand politician) (1856-1928), Member of Parliament in Otago, New Zealand
- John Rufus Edie, (1814-1888), member of the U.S. House of Representatives

== Fictional characters ==
- Edie, played by Sheila Hancock in the 2017 film Edie
- Edie, a main character in the 1954 film On the Waterfront
- Edie Britt, on the television series Desperate Housewives
- Edie Freehold, an elderly woman on the television series The Middle
- Edith Hughes (As the World Turns), on the soap opera As the World Turns from 1956 to 1960
- Edie McCredie, in the children's television series Balamory
- Edie Miller, on the television series NY-LON
- Edie Ochiltree, in Sir Walter Scott's 1816 novel The Antiquary
- Edie, a minor character on the television series This Is Us

== See also ==
- Edith Ewing Bouvier Beale (1895-1977), American socialite and eccentric nicknamed "Big Edie", mother of Edith Bouvier Beale
- Edith Bouvier Beale (1917–2002), American socialite, fashion model and cabaret performer nicknamed "Little Edie"
- Eddie (given name)
- Eddy (surname)
- Edey, surname
