= Edward Jenkins =

Edward Jenkins may refer to:

- Ed Jenkins (American football) (born 1950), former American football wide receiver
- Ed Jenkins, fictional protagonist of a series of novelettes by Erle Stanley Gardner
- Edward Jenkins (MP) (1838–1910), author and Member of Parliament (MP) for Dundee 1874–1880
- Edward Jenkins (priest) (1902–1996), Anglican Dean of St David's
- Edward Enoch Jenkins, Attorney General of Fiji (1938–1945)
- Edward Hopkins Jenkins (1850–1931), American agricultural chemist

== See also ==
- Ed Jenkins (disambiguation)
- Jenkins (disambiguation)
