= Edward Price (priest) =

Edward Price (1770–1832) was a 19th century Anglican priest in Ireland.

Price was born in Queen's County and educated at Trinity College, Dublin. He was Archdeacon of Killaloe from 1809 until his death.
