= Ned O'Connor =

Australian rules footballer

Personal information
- Full name: Edward Michael O'Connor
- Born: 3 June 1877; Seymour, Victoria
- Died: 12 July 1956 (aged 79); Frankston, Victoria
- Original team: Mangalore

Playing career^{1}
Years	Club	Games (Goals)
1906	St Kilda	1 (0)
- ^{1} Playing statistics correct to the end of 1906.

Edward Michael O'Connor (3 June 1877 – 12 July 1956) was an Australian rules footballer who played with St Kilda in the Victorian Football League (VFL).
