= Ed Lee (disambiguation) =

Ed Lee (1952–2017) was the 43rd mayor of San Francisco.

Ed Lee may also refer to:

- Ed Lee (ice hockey) (born 1961), American hockey player
- Ed Bok Lee, American poet
- Ed Lee (Neighbours), a character on Neighbours
- Ed Lee (American football), (born 1999), American football player

== See also ==
- Edward Lee (disambiguation)
