= Eddy W M Lai =

Hong Kong jockey

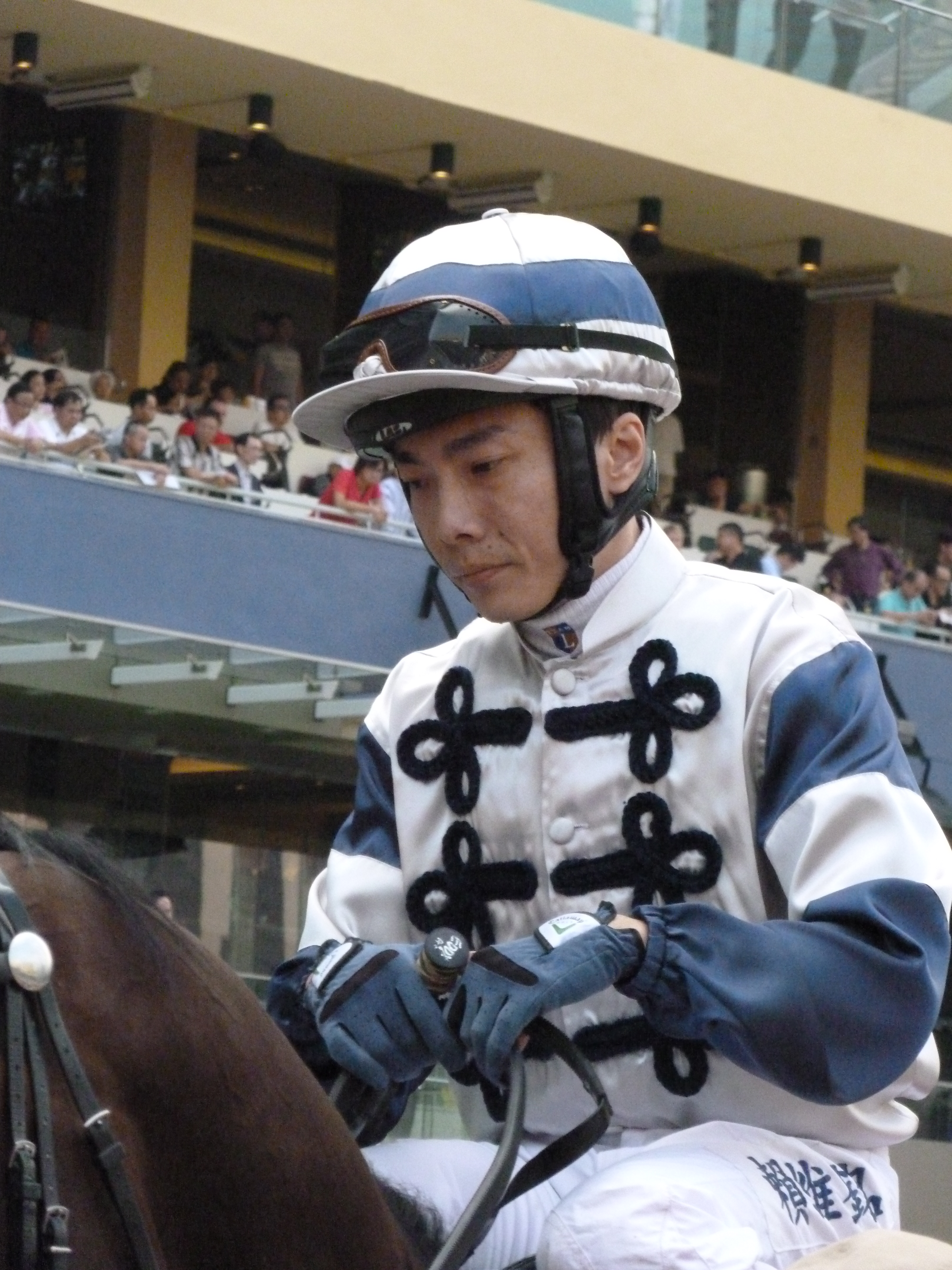
Eddy W M Lai

Eddy W M Lai (born 12 December 1973) is horse racing jockey. He has been riding in Hong Kong for 19 years. In 2010/11 he rode 14 winners to bring his career total to 245. In the 2013/14 season, he rode another 10 winners to bring his career total to 282.

== Major wins ==
- HKG1 Hong Kong Classic Mile - Self Flit (2003)
- HSBC Premier Bowl (HK Gr.3) - Absolute Champion (2006)
- HKG3 Premier Plate - Sapelli (2011)

== Performance ==
Seasons	Total Rides	No. of Wins	No. of 2nds	No. of 3rds	No. of 4ths	Stakes won
2010/2011	379	14	24	26	23	HK$14,857,450
