= Edwin Rodríguez =

Edwin Rodríguez may refer to:

- Edwin Rodríguez (baseball) (born 1960), baseball manager and former player born in Puerto Rico
- Edwin Rodríguez (boxer) (born 1985), Dominican-American boxer
- Ed Bassmaster (born 1973), American YouTube personality
- Edwin Rodríguez (footballer) (born 1999), Honduran footballer
