= Eddie Mosley =

American serial killer and rapist (1947–2020)

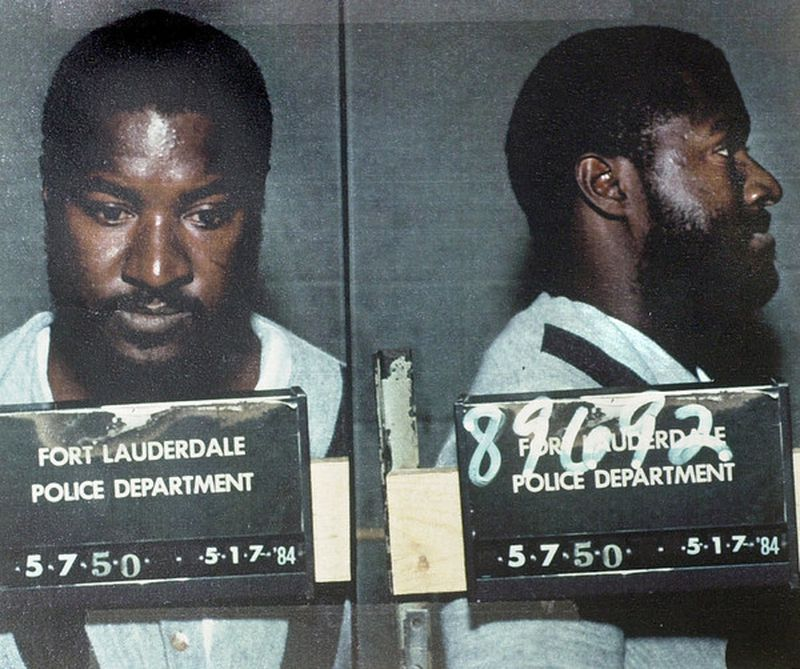
- 1984 mugshot
- Born: Eddie Lee Mosley; March 31, 1947; Fort Lauderdale, Florida, U.S.
- Died: May 28, 2020 (aged 73); Marianna, Florida, U.S.
- Conviction: N/A
- Penalty: Involuntary commitment

Details
- Victims: 8–16+
- Span of crimes: 1971–1987
- Country: United States
- State: Florida
- Date apprehended: May 17, 1987

Eddie Lee Mosley (March 31, 1947 – May 28, 2020) was an American serial killer and rapist who murdered at least eight women in Fort Lauderdale, Florida, between 1973 and 1987. He was arrested in 2001 following the results of a DNA profiling test, after being the prime suspect in several murders for many years. Before his arrest, two other men were wrongly convicted of several murders later attributed to Mosley: Frank Lee Smith, who spent 15 years in prison and died behind bars before he could be exonerated, and Jerry Townsend, who spent 22 years in prison before being released. Mosley's true victim count is unknown, with authorities speculating that he committed at least 16 murders and dozens of rapes.

== Biography ==
Eddie Mosley was born on March 31, 1947, as the third of ten children of a Fort Lauderdale family. Complications during his birth later led to him developing an acute respiratory disease as a child, causing him a slew of issues. In addition, from an early age he began to show signs of an intellectual disability and mental instability, had problems learning and experiencing anterograde amnesia, because of which he repeated his second year of elementary school several times. In 1960, at the age of 13, Eddie was forced to leave school for good as a third grade student. During his teenage years, he lived in poor conditions, and began to show signs of an antisocial personality. Owing to lack of formal education, he was forced to engage in low-skilled labor, but soon, due to financial difficulties, he turned towards crime. Since 1965, he had been arrested 9 times on varying charges, including indecent behavior, robbery, assault, attempted rape and murder, for which he spent 5 1/2 years in prison and almost 6 years in various psychiatric wards.

== Crimes ==
In the period between November 1971 and July 1973, almost 150 rapes of girls and women were recorded in the northwestern part of Fort Lauderdale. In all cases, the perpetrator was described as a young, tall black man with an athletic build and a scar on his left cheek, who, under the threat of physical violence, lured them to wastelands and other isolated areas, where he choked and sexually abused the victims. On July 23, 1973, three rape victims identified Mosley as their assailant, who, due to his physique and tall stature, well matched the composite of the rapist. After his arrest, his photographs were shown to other victims, resulting in more than 40 women identifying him as the rapist. During this period, Mosley was also the prime suspect in the rape-murders of two black girls in Fort Lauderdale, killed in early 1973, but since there was not enough evidence, he was only charged with the assaults and subsequent rape. However, following a mental evaluation, he was found to be insane, and was ordered involuntary commitment to the Florida State Hospital, where he spent five years. During his imprisonment, no other similar rapes or murders were recorded.

On February 1, 1979, Mosley was transferred to the South Florida State Hospital in Pembroke Pines. After completing a five-month treatment course, in the summer of that year he was deemed cured and no longer a danger to society, and was released, but had to continue his treatment on an outpatient basis by visiting a psychiatrist at the Henderson Mental Health Clinic in southwest Fort Lauderdale. After his release, Mosley moved back into his parents' house. Over the next seven months, seven young girls were found raped and murdered in the area. All of the murders were committed in the vicinity of Mosley's home, and he quickly became the prime suspect. In early 1980, fearful of the increased attention of law enforcement upon him, he left the city and moved to Lakeland, where his grandmother lived. Not long after, he became the prime suspect in the disappearances of two girls, Ida Eagles and Letha Mae Williams, who went missing shortly after his arrival. Mosley was arrested and subsequently interrogated, but was released, as the victims' bodies couldn't be located. He returned to Fort Lauderdale, where on April 12, 1980, he was arrested while attempting to rape a young girl. He was found guilty, and sentenced to 15 years imprisonment. While Mosley was in prison, the skeletal remains of Eagles and Williams were discovered near Lakeland. While incarcerated at the Broward County Jail, Mosley exhibited very aggressive behavior, often physically and sexually harassing other prisoners, and on one occasion, even confronting the guards and threatening to set the place ablaze. His family later hired a lawyer who filed an appeal to overturn his verdict in a new trial, citing the incompetence of Mosley's previous lawyer, who hadn't filed for a psychological examination of his client. The Appellate Court found significant flaws in the procedure, and would eventually overturn the conviction. At the new trial, the court took into account the mitigating factors and resentenced Mosley to a shorter prison term. Since he had spent more than 3 years in prison by that time, on December 15, 1983, he was paroled following a court decision.

In January 1984, Mosley came under police suspicion again after the bodies of 36-year-old Geraldine Barfield and 54-year-old Emma Cook were found in northwestern Fort Lauderdale, raped and subsequently killed by suffocation. On May 17, 1984, he was arrested for raping a 22-year-old woman. At trial, he pleaded not guilty, claiming that the sexual intercourse had been with mutual agreement. His lawyers managed to successfully portray the rape as consensual sex, in which Mosley had promised the victim drugs, and in October of that same year, Mosley was acquitted and released. After committing two more murders in the vicinity of Fort Lauderdale, the Broward County Sheriff's Office contacted the FBI, which, based on provided data, compiled an offender profile which was very consistent with Eddie Mosley's. In the spring of 1987, Mosley came under police scrutiny again, for the February 24th rape and strangulation of 24-year-old Sentreyl Love.

On May 17, 1987, Mosley was arrested for theft. By that time, his blood group was matched with the semen samples taken from the bodies of the murder victims, and it was found to be a match. In the interrogations, Mosley showed evidence of his involvement in numerous crimes committed over almost two decades, all committed in the city or near his home. Faced with detailed descriptions of where the bodies were found, their names and descriptions, Mosley tried to make up an alibi, but began to confuse his testimony, getting dates, geographic data and even seasons wrong. In the end, he confessed to the murders of Teresa Giles and Emma Cook, with which he was charged. His trial began on July 22, 1987, with a number of sex workers working at the Fort Lauderdale red-light districts testifying that Mosley had repeatedly demonstrated aggressive behavior towards women in front of crowds of witnesses. Based on various tests, the defendant's IQ was measured at 51 points, below the average intelligence rate. Because of this, it was ruled that he was incompetent to stand trial, and on October 23, he was sentenced to compulsory treatment at the Florida State Hospital.

== Exposure ==
For the remainder of his life, Mosley was shuffled between various clinics and mental institutions in the state. In 2000, samples of his saliva and blood were taken for DNA testing, which proved his guilt in the following murders: 29-year-old Loretta Young Brown, killed in 1984; 34-year-old Vetta Turner, killed on July 9, 1973; 13-year-old Sonja Yvette Marion, killed in July 1979; 21-year-old Terri Jean Cummings, found dead in August 1979; and finally, the murders of Emma Cook and Teresa Giles, to which he had confessed in May 1987. In addition, he was connected to the April 1985 murder of eight-year-old Shandra Whitehead, who had been raped and killed in her home. Another Fort Lauderdale man, 38-year-old Frank Lee Smith, who was intellectually disabled, was convicted of her murder. In 1960, at the age of 13, Smith killed 14-year-old John Wesley Spahn, but was released from custody in the mid-1960s, only to be later charged with the shooting death of 38-year-old Herbert DeWitt, who was killed during a robbery in 1966. Smith pleaded guilty to that murder and was sentenced to life imprisonment but released on parole in 1981. In April 1985, Smith was arrested and charged with killing Shandra, after the girl's mother wrongfully identified him as the killer, based solely on photographs she had been shown. Despite the lack of physical evidence linking him to the crime, Smith was found guilty and sentenced to death in 1986. From the beginning, he had claimed his innocence in this killing. He died on death row on January 30, 2000, from cancer-related complications, only months before a DNA test proved his innocence.

Mosley was also charged with the murder of 15-year-old Naomi Gamble, thus proving the innocence of 49-year-old Jerry Frank Townsend, who was arrested in Miami in 1979 on charges of raping a girl. After his arrest, he confessed to killing Gamble, as well as five other girls and women, among them Barbara Brown (killed in Broward County in 1973) and Sonja Yvette Marion. The charges against Townsend were later dropped, and he was released on June 15, 2001, after spending 22 years behind bars. Like Eddie Mosley, Townsend had been diagnosed as intellectually disabled from a young age.

Aside from his proven murders, the investigators tried to connect Mosley to other murders: among them were that of 24-year-old Santrail Lowe; 19-year-old Arnette Tukes, killed on February 22, 1980; 21-year-old Susan Boynton, killed in December 1979 and 16-year-old Gloria Irving, found murdered in 1980. However, Mosley's and the killer's DNA were deemed to be mismatched. Despite this, he hasn't been excluded from the list of suspects.

After establishing his guilt, the Fort Lauderdale police issued an arrest warrant for Mosley. However, according to the results of two independent psychiatric tests, conducted at the end of 2001, Mosley was again declared insane and thus couldn't be imprisoned. Over the years of treatment, he earned a reputation as an exemplary patient, was never disciplined and acted friendly towards management and staff members. As a result of this, in the late 1990s, he was transferred to the low-risk unit and was allowed to leave the hospital under supervision of staff, so he could make purchases in a nearby Walmart.

== Death ==
In the 2010s, due to his ailing health, Eddie Mosley was transferred to the Sunland Center in Marianna. In the spring of 2020, he was diagnosed with pneumonia and moved to the Jackson Hospital in Marianna, where he died on May 28, 2020, at the age of 73. Shortly before his death, he tested positive for COVID-19, which was later listed as the cause of death.

== See also ==
- List of wrongful convictions in the United States
- List of serial killers in the United States
