= Eady =

Eady is a surname. Notable people with the surname include:

- Alyse Eady (b. 1988), American news anchor
- Charles Eady, (1870–1945), Australian cricketer
- Charles Swinfen Eady, 1st Baron Swinfen, (1851–1919), British lawyer and judge
- Cornelius Eady, (b. 1954), American poet
- David Eady, (b. 1943), English High Court judge
- David Eady (film director) (1924–2009), British film director and producer
- Dorothy Eady, (1904–1981), English Egyptologist
- Eric Eady (1915–1966), British meteorology researcher
- George Eady (1865–1941), British politician
- Hanna Eady (b. 1956), Palestinian-American actor and playwright
- Jason Eady, American musician
- Josh Eady, Canadian producer
- Lewis Alfred Eady (1891–1965), New Zealand businessman
- Marshall Thomas Wilton Eady, Australian engineer
- Robin Eady (1940–2017), British physician
- Roger Swinfen Eady, 3rd Baron Swinfen (1938–2022), British peer
- Wilfred Griffin Eady (1890–1962), British treasury official and diplomat

== See also ==
- Eadie (surname)
- Edey, surname
- Baron Swinfen
