= Ed LaDou =

American chef, known for pizza (1955–2007)

- Born: Edward M. LaDou, III; October 9, 1955; McChord Field, Pierce County, Washington, U.S.
- Died: December 27, 2007 (aged 52); Santa Monica, California, U.S.
- Occupation: Pizza chef
- Culinary career
- Cooking style: California-style pizza; California

Edward M. LaDou, III (October 9, 1955 – December 27, 2007) was an American pizza chef, who is credited with popularizing gourmet California-style pizzas. Ed LaDou was the first pizza chef at Wolfgang Puck's Spago restaurant in Los Angeles. He also developed the first menu for the American chain restaurant California Pizza Kitchen.

The invention of the California-style pizza begins with a Berkeley, California, pizza restaurant, Chez Panisse, and its owner, Alice Waters. Waters was the first to create pizzas with exotic and unusual toppings which were cooked in a wood-burning pizza oven. However, LaDou was a major figure in the development and popularity of these types of pizzas. LaDou was known for introducing very unusual ingredients into his pizza recipes at a time when such toppings were highly unorthodox. Examples include duck breast and hoisin sauce pizza and barbecue chicken pizza.

== Early life ==
Ed LaDou was born on McChord Air Force Base in Washington state on October 9, 1955. His father, Edward M. LaDou, was a United States Air Force pilot and his mother is named Patricia Gallinetti. LaDou was partially raised in Los Altos, California, and first worked at a restaurant when he was a high school student.

== Pizza ==
LaDou was working as a chef at several restaurants in San Francisco by the mid-1970s, including at Frankie, Johnnie & Luigi Too! in San Francisco, and restaurant Ecco in Palo Alto. He gained a reputation as an experimental pizza maker, which often made him popular with his customers, but sometimes clashed with the ideas of the owners of the restaurants in which he worked. LaDou was working at a restaurant called Prego, when he was discovered by chef Wolfgang Puck, who was eating at the restaurant. Puck ordered one of LaDou's pizzas, which was topped with ricotta cheese, red peppers, pâté and mustard and immediately offered him a job at his Spago restaurant in Los Angeles, which at the time was not open yet.

=== Spago ===
Spago opened in January 1982 with LaDou as its first pizza chef. Puck allowed La Dou to choose his own toppings and recipes. The original menu included pizzas topped with duck sausage or smoked salmon. LaDou later remarked in an interview about his move to Spago, "It was like being an artist who'd worked with 10 colors all of his life and then got to use 300." LaDou's pizzas were highly popular, making reservations at Spago very hard to get.

=== California Pizza Kitchen ===
LaDou was approached by Larry Flax, who co-founded the California Pizza Kitchen in 1985 with fellow attorney Rick Rosenfield. Flax had previously taken a pizza making course with LaDou at Los Angeles' Ma Maison, where Wolfgang Puck had been a chef immediately prior to opening Spago. Flax and Rosenfield asked LaDou to help develop a menu for the California Pizza Kitchen. LaDou accepted and developed the restaurant chain's first menu, which included the CPK's signature barbecue chicken pizza. The California Pizza Kitchen became a success and now has restaurants across the United States and worldwide.

=== Caioti ===
LaDou left California Pizza Kitchen shortly after developing its menu. In 1987, he opened his own restaurant, called Caioti Cafe, which first opened in Laurel Canyon, and later a Caioti Pizza Cafe restaurant on the Sunset Strip with Carol Saiz, before moving to its current location in Studio City, California. Notable dishes invented at Caioti Cafe included "Mexican cactus pizza", "smoked rabbit pizza", and "foie gras calzone". The Caioti Pizza Cafe is known for the garlic knots, the smoked salmon pizza (like the one from Spago), the barbecue chicken pizza (like the one from California Pizza Kitchen), "Cajun pizza", and "Rockefeller Pizza".

At Caioti Pizza Cafe, LaDou invented a salad that many customers believe induces labor during pregnancy. It is called, "The Salad" and contains romaine lettuce, watercress, walnuts, and gorgonzola, tossed with a "magical" balsamic dressing. The dressing is so popular it is sold by the bottle. Hillary Duff, Jinger Duggar, and other celebrities have attempted to use the salad to induce labor.

== Death ==
Ed LaDou died of cancer at St. John's Health Center in Santa Monica, California, on December 27, 2007, at the age of 52. He was surrounded by his wife, Carrie LaDou, and their daughter, Cassidy Rose.
