= Edie Rodriguez =

American businesswoman (born 1961)

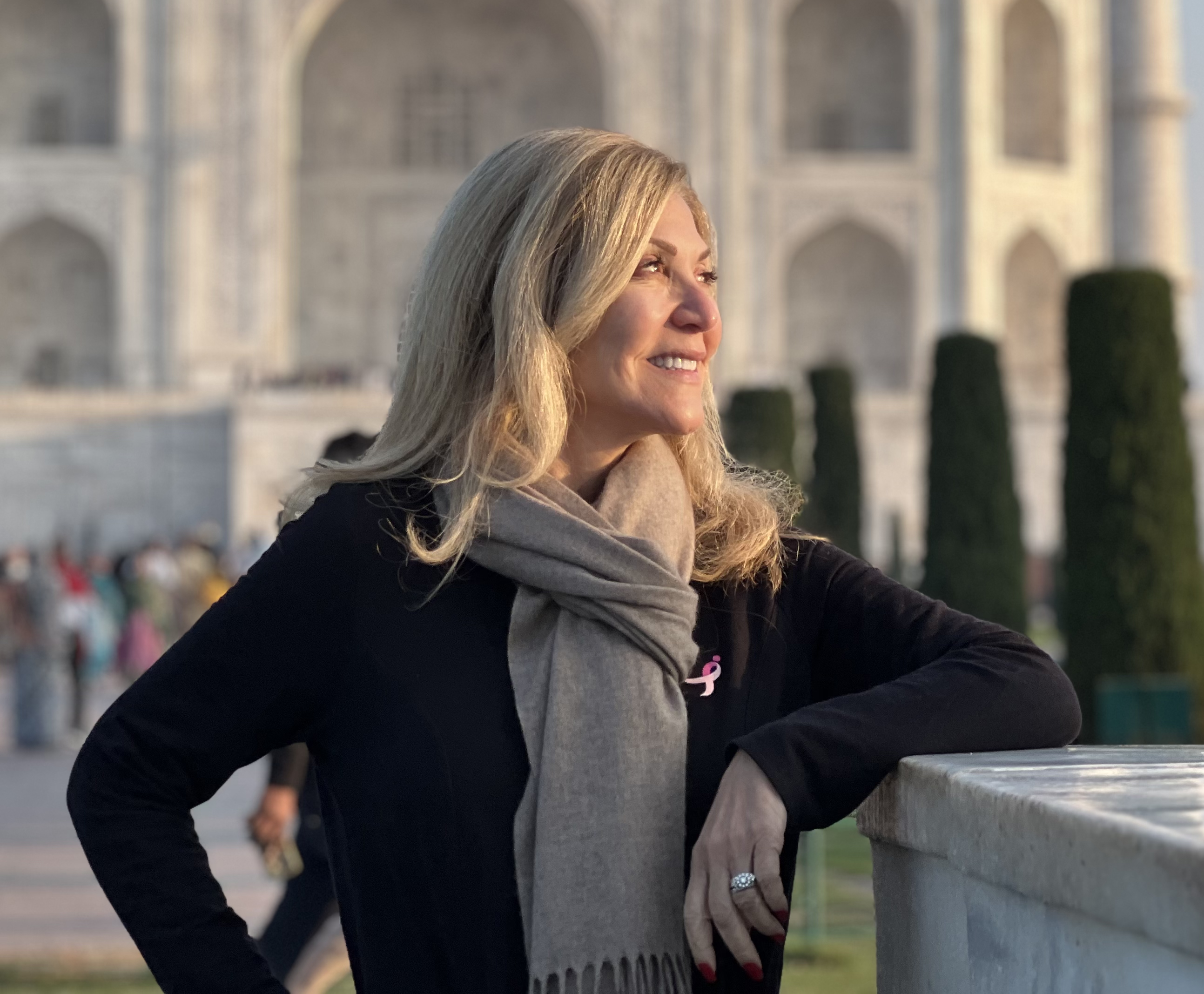
- Edie Rodriguez, February 2024
- Born: Edie Bornstein; August 29, 1961
- Occupations: Travel industry executive businesswoman

Edie Rodriguez is an American businesswoman and travel industry executive. She has held executive or board member positions with a number of travel industry corporations, especially in the area of cruise lines and luxury products.

== Early life and education ==
Rodriguez grew up in New York and New Jersey.

== Career ==
Rodriguez began her professional career as a travel consultant, rising to travel agency management positions before joining Amadeus, an IT provider for the global travel and tourism industry.

Rodriguez has held senior executive positions with other large cruise line operators, including Carnival Corporation, operator of Carnival Cruise Lines, and Royal Caribbean Cruises Ltd. (RCL). She was senior vice-president of marketing and sales at RCL's high-end division, Azamara Club Cruises. At Carnival Corporation, she served as vice president of business development and strategic partnerships and was a senior officer for Carnival Cruise Lines and the Cunard and Seabourn brands.

Rodriguez became CEO and President of Crystal Cruises in autumn 2013, and served in this capacity until September 2017. During this time she negotiated the sale of the company to Genting Hong Kong in May 2015. Following the acquisition, Rodriguez announced major brand and fleet expansion plans for Crystal Cruises, which began with the launch of Crystal Yacht Cruises' Crystal Esprit in December 2015, Crystal Luxury Air, a private charter Bombardier Global Express Jet launched in spring 2016, and Crystal Mozart, a series of luxury river yachts launched in summer 2016.

== Awards and recognition ==
Rodriguez was named EY Entrepreneur of the Year for Florida in 2017, named as a "Wave Maker" in 2016 by Afar Magazine as one of ten "visionaries making travel better", and selected as one of the most influential people in travel in 2016 by TravelPulse.
