= Broken Rainbow (organisation) =

British LGBTQ charity

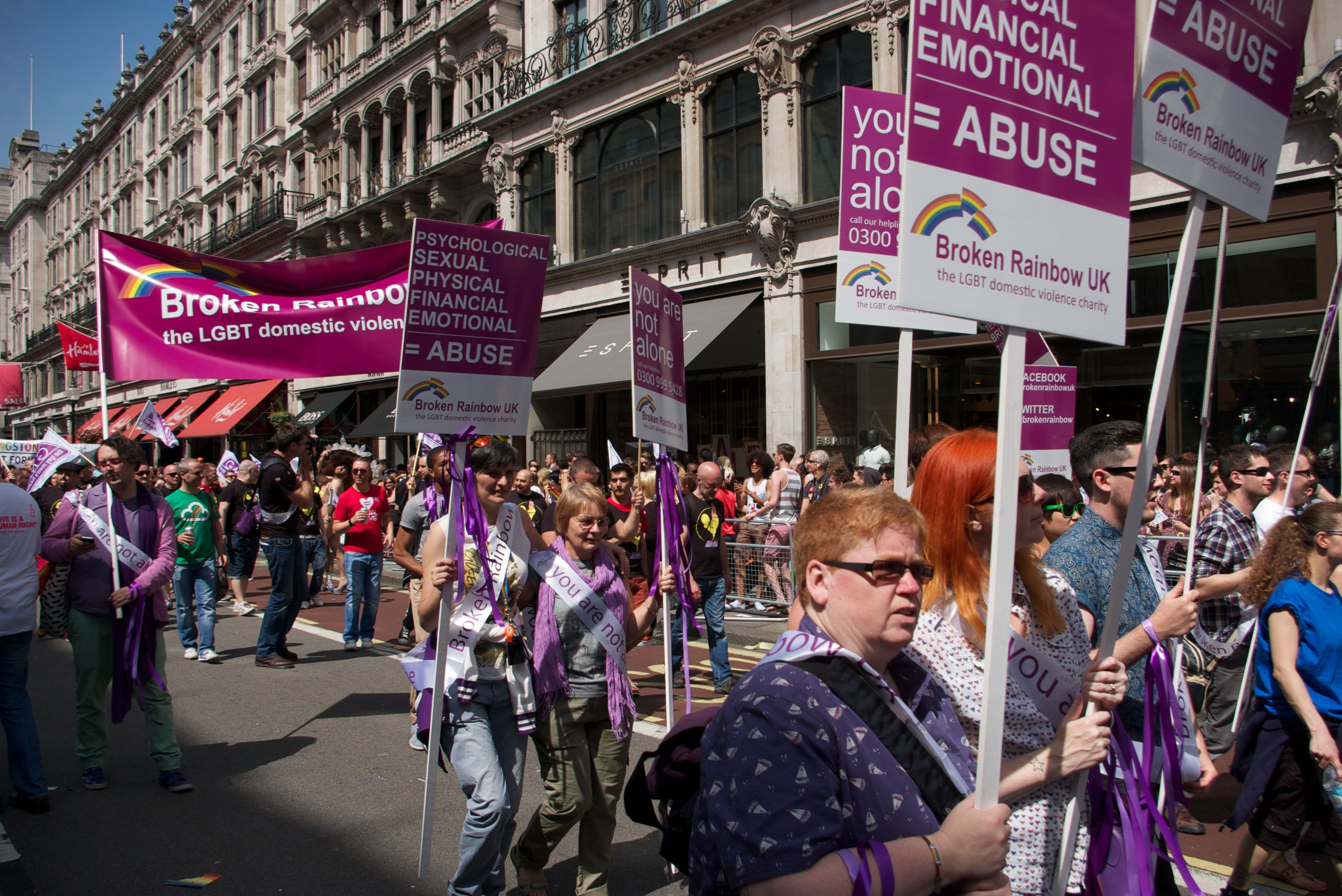
Broken Rainbow at Pride in London 2013

Broken Rainbow was a British LGBT (lesbian, gay, bisexual and transgender) charity intended to help raise awareness and combat same-sex domestic violence and abuse. It was formed in 2004 and went into liquidation in June 2016.

Broken Rainbow was formed in response to the lack of aid for lesbian, gay, bisexual and transgender people who experience domestic violence and abuse in the UK. With funding from the Nationwide Foundation and the Home Office, they operated the only UK LGBT domestic violence helpline. They also raised awareness of lesbian, gay, bisexual and trans issues surrounding domestic violence in the UK and lobbied members of Parliament.

Following the organization's financial collapse in 2016, BuzzFeed News reported that it went under as a result of financial mismanagement, including as a result of lavish spending by CEO Jo Harvey Barringer. Its hotline continues to be funded by the Home Office and is now operated by the anti-hate-crime LGBT charity Galop.
