= Edward W. Price (engineer) =

- Born: 1920
- Died: June 11, 2012 (aged 91–92)
- Citizenship: United States of America
- Engineering career
- Discipline: Aerospace Engineering
- Employers: Naval Ordnance Test Station (? - 1974), Georgia Institute of Technology (1974-1991)
- Significant advance: rocket propulsion
- Awards: Elected to the National Academy of Engineering (2000)

Edward W. Price (1920 – June 11, 2012) was an engineer who worked in the field of solid rocket propellants, primarily at the Naval Ordnance Test Station (NOTS), where he made contributions to ignition, combustion instabilities, fuel components, and the "T-burner" method of testing. After 30 years at NOTS, he moved to Georgia Tech in 1974 to continue his propellant work, being promoted to Regents' Professor in 1986, and retiring in 1991. He was recognized with the NASA Public Service Award in 1988 and elected to the National Academy of Engineering in 2000 for "critical contributions to the understanding of solid propellant combustion and solid rockets developments".
