= Big Ed =

Big Ed may refer to:

== Nickname ==
- Ed "Big Ed" Burns (c. 1842–?), American con man and crime boss
- Ed Delahanty (1867–1903), American Major League Baseball player
- Ed Reulbach (1882–1961), American Major League Baseball pitcher
- Ed Sanders (boxer) (1930–1954), American boxer and 1952 Olympic heavyweight champion
- Edward Everett Smith (1861–1931), Lieutenant Governor of Minnesota
- Ed Stevens (baseball) (1925–2012), American Major League Baseball player
- Ed Walsh (1881–1959), American Major League Baseball pitcher and manager
- Ed White (American football) (born 1947), American former National Football League player
- Edmund Kemper (born 1948), serial killer

== Stage name ==
- Big Ed (rapper) (1971–2001)

== TV characters ==
- Edward Melvin Deline, on the American TV series Las Vegas
- Ed Dhandapani, on the American TV series Scrubs
- Big Ed Hurley, on the American TV series Twin Peaks and the film Twin Peaks: Fire Walk with Me

== See also ==
- Big Eddy (disambiguation)
