= Ted Brown (activist) =

British gay rights activist

- Born: 1 February 1950 (age 76); Brentwood, New York, U.S.
- Occupation: Activist
- Organization: Gay Liberation Front
- Movement: LGBT movement
- Partner: Noel Glynn
- Mother: Dorothy Walker

Ted Brown (born 1 February 1950) is a British gay rights activist. He organised the United Kingdom's first Gay Pride Rally in 1972 as part of his work in the Gay Liberation Front and co-founded Black Lesbians and Gays Against Media Homophobia (BLAGAMH). He has been described by The Guardian as a "key figure in both British civil rights history and LGBT history".

== Early life ==
Brown's parents were both Jamaican. His mother, Dorothy Walker, was a pharmacist while his father worked as a garage attendant. They separated before he was born; his father later gave Walker, who was pregnant with Brown, a cup of coffee laced with drugs and called for medical assistance, causing her to be detained and taken to Pilgrim State Hospital, a psychiatric hospital in Brentwood, New York. On 1 February 1950, Brown was born at the hospital. He had an older sister, Jewel. Upon her release, Brown moved with his mother to Harlem and he went to the Catholic Our Lady of Victory school. There, he could meet with Jewel due to his parents sharing custody of her. In Harlem he was inspired by various black sportspeople including the Harlem Globetrotters and musical artists Billie Holiday, Sarah Vaughan, Billy Eckstine, and Ella Fitzgerald. He was five years old when Emmett Till was lynched, and was influenced by television coverage of the murder.

His mother was listed by the Federal Bureau of Investigation as a "troublemaker" and "a person of poor character" for her involvement with "disturbances instigated by the NAACP", causing Brown, his mother and his younger half sister Jackie to be deported to Jamaica on the SS Arcadia on 23 April 1956. Jackie's father, a white Jewish man, was not able to go with them and died before they could reunite. Brown's biological father married an American woman and so was not deported; Brown did not see him again. His mother later found work in Canada as a pharmacist, leaving him and his half sister in Jamaica, though he was not accepted by his Jamaican family members due to the colour of his skin. They later joined their mother in Canada when she could support him, and moved to the United Kingdom in 1959, following the first of the Windrush arrivals and staying homeless for a few weeks due to housing discrimination. They found accommodation in Brixton and later moved to Deptford when Brown was age 12. There, the National Front protested their residence in the area by pushing dog waste through their letterboxes and breaking their windows, causing them to move again to Greenwich. During this time, Brown's half brother Bobby was born.

Brown realised he was gay at 13 years of age due to the film Carmen Jones. His best friend, who he suspected was also gay, committed suicide at the age of 15 which incensed Brown to come out to his mother; she accepted him, partially due to the speeches of Bayard Rustin. He also came out to his friends and the rest of his family in 1965, two years before homosexuality was partially decriminalised in England and Wales. Brown's mother died aged 50 on 22 November 1965 after a concurrent heart and asthma attack which she suffered in front of him and his siblings, who were sent to different children's homes. He became suicidal, but was imbued by news of the 1969 Stonewall riots at age 19.

== Activism ==
In November 1970, during a visit to the cinema to see The Boys In The Band, Brown was given a leaflet from the newly formed UK Gay Liberation Front (GLF). He attended the organisation's third meeting and quickly became a part of the group. During his time there, he led the black section of Galop. There, he experienced a confrontation with a white member who used a racial slur and joked about how white girls only dated black boys "to get their handbags back", and this caused Brown to leave the organisation. He took part in the GLF's Highbury Fields march in 1970 against the arrest of Young Liberals chairman Louis Eakes. In 1971, he marched with the GLF's youth group against unequal age of consent laws. He helped organise the first UK Gay Pride Rally in London on 1 July 1972, during which over 2,000 people marched and held a mass kiss-in. Brown himself was one of few black people at the march. He also protested against the publication by Pan Books of Everything You Always Wanted to Know About Sex* (*But Were Afraid to Ask) while part of the GLF. He has since stated that to him, "the basic principle of the GLF was that one should come out to show people who we actually are."

He moved on to work for Lewisham Action on Policing, and later co-founded Black Lesbians and Gays Against Media Homophobia (BLAGAMH). In 1990, he started a year-long campaign with the group against African-Caribbean tabloid The Voice which on 29 October 1991 forced it to make an apology for its coverage of Justin Fashanu, a gay footballer. In 1992, Brown appeared on youth programme The Word to protest against Buju Banton, prompting Banton's fans to confront Brown and beat him unconscious in his Brixton home. Brown later expressed his frustration that the police lacked interest in the matter.

In 2021, Brown's civil partner Noel Glynn was abused in Albany Lodge nursing home in Croydon, suffering from bruising across his body and a cigarette burn to the back of his hand. Staff taunted Glynn and did not recognise their relationship, referring to Brown as Glynn's "friend" or "father". The suspected staff members were suspended for two weeks, but Brown said they returned to the home “on another floor”. Glynn died before he was awarded £30,000 by Lambeth Council after Brown sued in 2021. A short film documenting Brown's grief for Glynn directed by Julia Alcamo, Ted & Noel, was released in 2023 and won the Iris Prize Co-op Audience Award. Channel 4 released it to the public in 2023 and is expected to stream it until October 2024.

More recently Brown has focused on the media environment around transgender people, describing it as identical to the treatment of gay people during his youth. In 2022, he participated in the London Pride march on the 50th anniversary of his original pride march on 1 June, and he spoke at the 2022 UK Black Pride in August. He appeared on the podcast Black and Gay, Back in the Day to speak about his life.
