= Edsel (given name) =

Edsel is a masculine given name which may refer to:

- Edsel Albert Ammons (1924–2010), American Methodist bishop
- Edsel Chase (born 1968), Barbadian sprinter
- Edsel Ford (1893–1943), president of Ford Motor Company and son of Henry Ford
- Edsel Ford (poet) (1928–1970), American poet
- Edsel Ford II (born 1948), Ford Motor Company executive and great-grandson of Henry Ford
- Edsel Ford Fong (1927–1984), American restaurant server noted for his rudeness
- Edsel Gomez (born 1962), Puerto Rican jazz pianist
- Edsel Martis (born 1961), Dutch baseball player
- Edsel Schweizer (1923–2003), American football coach
- Edsel Torres Gómez (born 1962), Puerto Rican criminal
