= Ed Jenkins =

Ed Jenkins may refer to:

- Ed Jenkins (politician) (1933–2012), Edgar Jenkins, U.S. Representative from Georgia
- Ed Jenkins (American football) (born 1950), Edward Jenkins, former American football wide receiver
- Ed Jenkins, fictional protagonist of a series of novelettes by Erle Stanley Gardner
- Ed Jenkins (rugby union) (born 1986), Australian rugby union player
- Ed Jenkins, better known as Ed Real, British disc jockey and record producer

== See also ==
- Edward Jenkins (disambiguation)
- Eddie Jenkins (disambiguation)
