= Simon Edy =

London beggar (1709–1783)

Simon Edy, known as Old Simon, (c. 1709-18 May 1783) was a London beggar who may have served as an inspiration for a popular nursery rhyme. He lived in a derelict "Rats' Castle" in the rookery of Dyott Street. He was born in Woodford in Northamptonshire in 1709 and died on 18 May 1783. He had a succession of dogs and the last of them was a drover's sheepdog called Rover.

He begged outside the churchyard of St Giles in the Fields and was a well-known figure, being portrayed by artists including John Seago and Thomas Rowlandson. He wore several hats, coats, rings and collected much bric-a-brac such as cuttings from old newspapers like The Gentleman's Magazine, from which he regaled passers-by. As he was a simpleton, he is thought to be a possible inspiration for the nursery rhyme, Simple Simon, which was published in the Royal Book of Nursery Rhymes nearby in Monmouth Court.
