= Edward Lee (footballer) =

English footballer

Personal information
- Position: Winger

Senior career*
Years	Team	Apps	(Gls)
1902–1903	Burnley	26	(3)
- * Club domestic league appearances and goals

Edward Lee was an English professional footballer who played as a winger.
