= Eddie Elder =

American gridiron football player (born 1989)

No. 5
- Position: Defensive back

Personal information
- Born: February 14, 1989 (age 37); Oakland, California, U.S.
- Listed height: 5 ft 10 in (1.78 m)
- Listed weight: 186 lb (84 kg)

Career information
- High school: Burbank (Sacramento, California)
- College: San Mateo (2008–2009); Arizona State (2010–2011)
- NFL draft: 2012: undrafted

Career history
- 2012: Arizona Cardinals*
- 2014: Ottawa Redblacks
- * Offseason or practice squad member only

Awards and highlights
- First-team All-American (2009)
- Stats at CFL.ca (archive)

Eddie Jiles Elder (born February 14, 1989) is an American former professional football defensive back who played for the Ottawa Redblacks of the Canadian Football League (CFL). He played college football at the College of San Mateo and Arizona State University. He was also a member of the Arizona Cardinals of the National Football League (NFL).

== Early life ==
Eddie Jiles Elder was born on February 14, 1989, in Oakland, California. He was a three-year varsity starter at Luther Burbank High School in Sacramento, California.

== College career ==
Elder played college football for the San Mateo Bulldogs of the College of San Mateo from 2008 to 2009. He totaled 49 tackles, two sacks, and six interceptions his freshman year in 2008. He recorded 70 tackles, four forced fumbles, and seven interceptions in 2009, earning Scout.com first-team junior college All-American honors. Elder was also named the California junior college defensive player of the year for 2009. He graduated with an Associate in Arts from San Mateo.

Elder was then a two-year letterman for the Arizona State Sun Devils of Arizona State University from 2010 to 2011. He played in all 12 games, starting nine, for the Sun Devils during the 2010 season, accumulating 47 solo tackles, 17 assisted tackles, one sack, two interceptions, and three pass breakups. He appeared in all 13 games, starting 11 at free safety, in 2011, totaling 45 solo tackles, 21 assisted tackles, one forced fumble, one interception, and four pass breakups. Elder played in the Casino del Sol College All-Star Game after his senior year. He majored in Business Information Systems at Arizona State.

== Professional career ==
Elder was signed by the Arizona Cardinals on May 14, 2012. He was released by the Cardinals on August 24, 2012.

Elder signed with the Ottawa Redblacks on December 31, 2013. He dressed in 14 games, starting eight, for the Reblacks during the 2014 season, recording 18 defensive tackles, three special teams tackles, and one punt return for six yards. He was released by the Redblacks on February 23, 2015.

== Coaching career ==
Elder was the head football coach at West Campus High School in Sacramento from 2015 to 2016, accumulating a 3–20 record. He was then the head coach at his alma mater, Luther Burbank High School, from 2017 to 2021. He became the safeties coach at American River College in 2022.
