= Cec Edey =

English footballer

Personal information
- Full name: Cecil Edey
- Date of birth: 12 March 1965 (age 61)
- Place of birth: Manchester, England
- Height: 6 ft 1 in (1.85 m)
- Position: Defender

Senior career*
Years	Team	Apps	(Gls)
1992-1993	Winsford United	40	(2)
1996–1997	Macclesfield Town	?	(?)
1997	Stalybridge Celtic	?	(?)
1997–1998	Macclesfield Town	12	(0)
1998–1999	Hyde United	8	(1)
Total		60	(3)
- * Club domestic league appearances and goals

Cecil Edey (born 12 March 1965) is an English retired professional footballer who played as a defender for Macclesfield Town in the Football League.
