= Eddie Fitte =

Argentinian writer

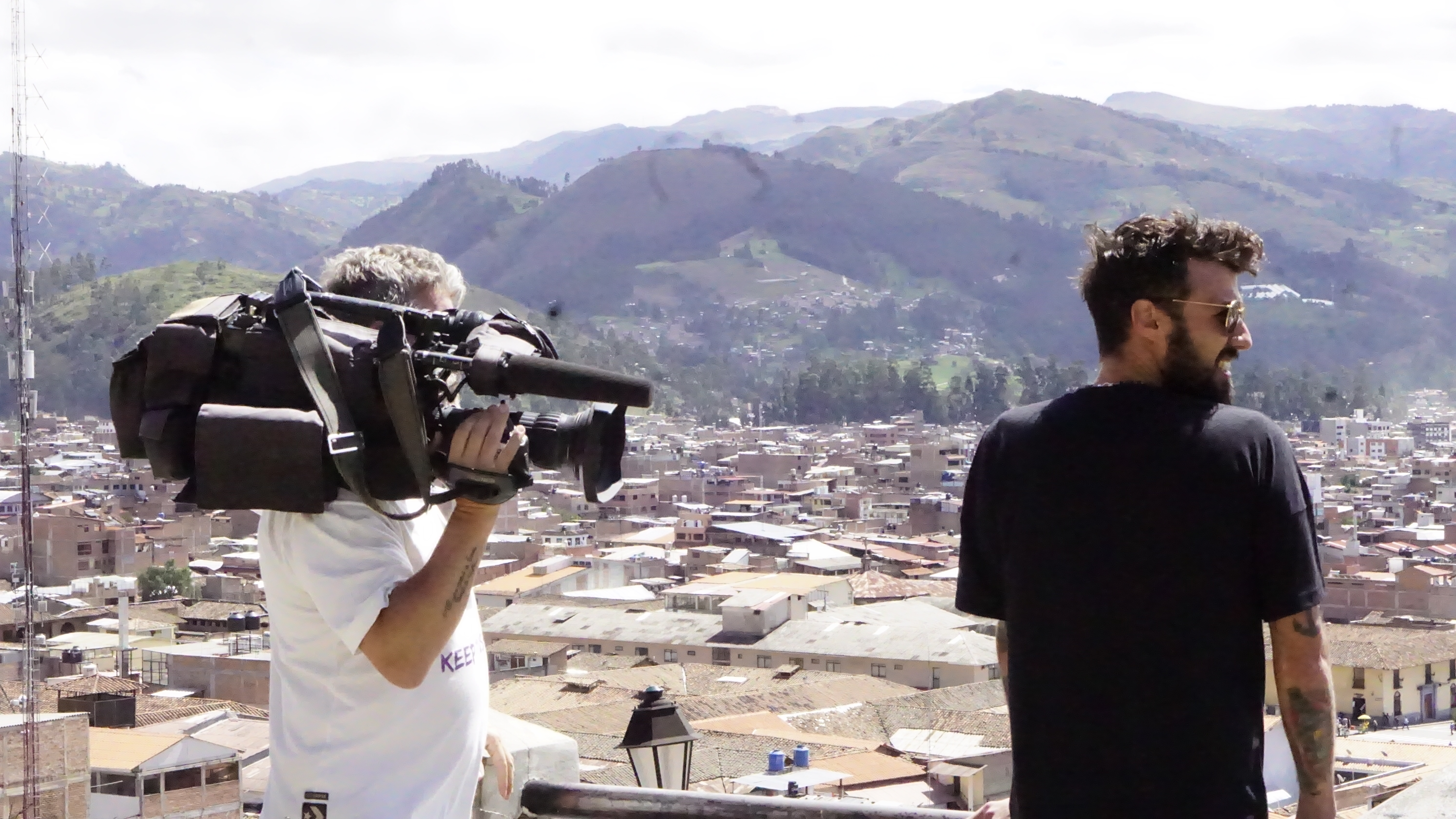
- Fitte shooting "Las podridas" in Peru, February 2019.
- Born: Eduardo Giménez Fitte; July 17, 1987 (age 38); City of Buenos Aires, Argentina
- Occupations: Journalist; Writer; producer; screenwriter
- Years active: 2005–present
- Works: Filmography
- Spouse: Carolina Schattner (2017–present)

Eddie Fitte (born Eduardo Giménez Fitte, July 17, 1987) is an Argentinian journalist, writer, producer and television host.

== Career ==
Fitte started his career writing for the national newspaper Diario Clarin. Later on, he branched into television as a travel documentarian for Telenoche, Argentina's main prime time news program. Focusing on the exploration of international culture, Eddie recorded a series of investigations related to human and civil rights, migration and youth issues in more than 60 cities around the world. During 2015, he contributed with journalist and lawyer Glenn Greenwald working with Edward Snowden's leaked information from the NSA, related to the British illegal espionage in Argentina. About these revelations the reporter said that "the most striking thing is the level of concern that England has about Argentina. From 2006 to 2011, Argentina was declared as the principal target of British espionage along with Iran".

In 2018 the New York Festivals awarded Fitte with the medal for Best Documentary for his work on "The Argentinian saint of Madagascar" (El santo argentino de Madagascar). The 54-minute special program was about the life of the Peace Nobel Prize candidate, Pere Pedro Opeka.

Appearing in online content, as well as the national television show with his Todo Noticias Special Reports, Fitte gained notoriety interviewing diverse cultural personalities from Mike Tyson, or Paris Hilton to Michel Houellebecq and Marilyn Manson. His documentarian trips gained notoriety too after his pieces about the Burning Man, Miracle Village or Paran: the blind town at The Andes mountains appeared on air.

Between 2017 and 2020 Eddie hosted a docuseries about food and travel called De Barrio" and received a Webby Award for the show.

After leaving Telenoche he hosted the Latin American version of Shifting Gears with Aaron Kaufman for Discovery Channel, as he opened his way producing for CNN, writing for Vice and started his career in independent filmmaking. In 2019 Fitte founded his own production company, Hecho Por Nadie, where he currently writes and produces journalistic content.

During December 2020, Marta and Felipe, Ricardo Fort's twins, announced they had authorized the rights to make the original series of their father's life on a documentary that Fitte had been scripting for long. In September 2021, Fitte joined Luciano Banchero and Fiorella Sargenti in Nuestro Día, an original daily podcast by Spotify Studios for Argentina.

== Writing style and themes ==
=== Style ===
In 2015, Argentinian specialized journalist Victor Hugo Ghitta, described Fitte's style as politically incorrect dirty realism. Fitte often says that his writing style has been influenced by authors such as John Fante, Charles Bukowski or William Burroughs.

=== Themes ===
Fitte's books prior to The Escorts (Los Escoltas) have distinct similarities. Eddie labels his stories as transgressional fiction, following another of his big influences, Chuck Palahniuk. His characters are usually people that enjoy certain privileges but have often been marginalized in one way or another by society. His plots can be defined as misanthropic. When not writing fiction, Fitte tends to write non-fiction works. Working as a freelance journalist, he writes essays and reports on a variety of subjects, mainly related to urban counter cultural issues

== Filmography ==
- 2020: Indie & Fuertes (Short film/documentary, producer)
- 2018: The untold story of the Peruvian genocide(TV Series documentary, host, producer)
- 2018: Wild journey to the American dream (TV Series documentary, host, producer)
- 2017: The exodus before the wall: The story of Las Patronas"(TV Series documentary, host, producer)
- 2016: "The Argentinian saint of Madagascar: The story of Pedro Opeka""(TV Series documentary, host, producer)
- 2014: Memories of an elephant: The Story of Lek Chailert"(TV Series documentary, host, producer)
- 2013: Lion Heart: The story of Kevin Richardson (TV Series documentary, host, producer)

== Books ==
- Un c*lo en mi ventana (cuentos para incultos) (2015). Emecé. Editorial Planeta. ISBN 978-950-04-3691-5
- Pungueate este libro (cuentos psiquiátricos) (2017). Emecé. Editorial Planeta. ISBN 978-950-04-3927-5
- El trapo más grande del mundo (cuentos de Supermercado, Edición 01)" (2019). Amazon Kindle independently published. ISBN 978-950-04-3927-5
- Monólogo de un león cautivo (2020). Amazon Kindle independently published. ISBN 979-862-47-0011-6
- Los Escoltas y el secreto plan del peronismo para viajar en el tiempo (2021). Editorial Nudista. ISBN 978-987-8341-17-0
- Helter Kelper (2021). Amazon Kindle independently published. ISBN 979-845-56-7020-6
