= Pizza My Heart (restaurant) =

American pizzeria chain

Restaurant information
- Established: 1981
- Website: www.pizzamyheart.com

Pizza My Heart is a chain of pizzeria restaurants in the San Francisco Bay Area and the Central Coast. The chain was founded in 1981 in Capitola, California, by Fred Poulos and Keith Holtaway.

In 1997, the chain merged with Pizza-a-Go-Go, which was based in San Jose, California. The new locations inherited the Pizza My Heart name. It is now owned by Chuck Hammers. All locations are owned and operated by the company.

There are restaurants currently in Aptos, Burlingame, Capitola (2), Cupertino, Dublin, Fremont, Gilroy, Los Gatos, Monterey, Mountain View, Palo Alto, Pleasant Hill, Redwood City, San Jose (6), San Mateo, San Ramon, Santa Clara (3), Santa Cruz, Saratoga, Sunnyvale, and Tracy.

A long-running TV campaign featured pro surfer Wingnut (Robert "Wingnut" Weaver), cast as a character named Jimmy.
