= Big Eddy, Kentucky =

Unincorporated community in Kentucky, United States

- Unincorporated community
- Location within the state of Kentucky Big; Eddy (the United States)
- Coordinates: 38°10′12″N 84°51′30″W
- Country: United States
- State: Kentucky
- County: Franklin
- Elevation: 515 ft (157 m)
- Time zone: UTC-5 (Eastern (EST))
  - Summer (DST): UTC-4 (EDT)
- GNIS feature ID: 507507

Big Eddy is an unincorporated community in Franklin County, Kentucky, United States.
