= Eddie Price =

American football player (1925–1979)

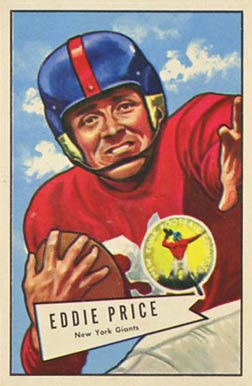
- Price on a 1952 Bowman football card

No. 31
- Position: Fullback

Personal information
- Born: September 2, 1925; New Orleans, Louisiana, U.S.
- Died: July 21, 1979 (aged 53); New Orleans, Louisiana, U.S.
- Listed height: 5 ft 11 in (1.80 m)
- Listed weight: 195 lb (88 kg)

Career information
- High school: Warren Easton (LA)
- College: Tulane (1946–1949)
- NFL draft: 1950: 2nd round, 20th overall pick

Career history
- New York Giants (1950–1955)

Awards and highlights
- 3× Pro Bowl (1951, 1952, 1954); 2× All-Pro (1951, 1952); NFL rushing leader (1951); 98th greatest New York Giant of all-time; First-team All-American (1949); Third-team All-American (1948); 2× First-team All-SEC (1948, 1949)

Career NFL statistics
- Rushing yards: 3,292
- Rushing average: 3.9
- Receptions: 75
- Receiving yards: 672
- Total touchdowns: 24
- Stats at Pro Football Reference
- College Football Hall of Fame

Edward Joseph Price Jr. (Note: Price and his father (born in 1898) had the same full name and lived at the same address at the time they submitted World War II draft registration cards. Examples of the younger Price using "Jr." are first found when he was a political candidate in 1963. The "Jr." also appears on the Pro-Football-Reference.com website.) (September 2, 1925 – July 21, 1979) was an American professional football player who was a running back for the New York Giants of the National Football League (NFL). After playing college football at Tulane University, he played six seasons with the Giants. Price was inducted to the College Football Hall of Fame in 1982.

== Biography ==
Price was born in New Orleans and attended Warren Easton High School there, class of 1943. He served in the United States Navy during World War II, then attended Tulane University and played college football for the Green Wave.

At Tulane, Price was a four-year letterman in football, for the 1946–1949 seasons. He was named to All-Southeastern Conference (SEC) teams three times, 1947–1949, the latter two times being a consensus selection. He was named to College Football All-America Teams in 1948 and 1949 by some selectors.

Price played in the 1950 Senior Bowl, the inaugural edition of that game, scoring a fourth-quarter touchdown for the South team, which defeated the North team, 22–13. He was selected in the second round of the 1950 NFL draft by the New York Giants. He had previously been selected by the Brooklyn Dodgers of the All-America Football Conference (AAFC) in the 1949 AAFC Draft, but he did not play in that league.

Price's NFL career lasted six seasons, 1950–1955, all with the Giants. He led the NFL in rushing in 1951, gaining 971 yards on 271 carries in a 12-week season. His 80.9 yards per game also led the league. He played a total of 63 regular-season NFL games (50 starts) while accruing 3,292 yards on 846 attempts, an average of 3.9 yards per carry. He had 20 rushing touchdowns and four receiving touchdowns.

Following his professional football career, Price returned on New Orleans. He worked as a television sports announcer and also worked in sales for a brewing company. In September 1963, Price was announced as a candidate for Lieutenant Governor of Louisiana, paired with gubernatorial candidate Louis J. Michot. Michot placed sixth in the Democratic gubernatorial primary.

Price's son, Eddie Price III, (Note: During the time Eddie Price III played football, some newspaper reports referred to him as Eddie Price Jr.) also played football for Tulane and was a two-year letterman, 1972–1973. The elder Price was inducted to the Louisiana Sports Hall of Fame in 1975, and was a charter member of the Tulane Athletics Hall of Fame when it was established in 1977. He died in July 1979 at his New Orleans home of a heart attack, aged 53. He was posthumously inducted to the College Football Hall of Fame in 1982. Price is also an inductee of the Warren Easton Hall of Fame.

== NFL career statistics ==
Legend
	Led the league
**Bold**	Career high

Year	Team	Games		Rushing					Receiving				
Year	Team	GP	GS	Att	Yds	Avg	Lng	TD	Rec	Yds	Avg	Lng	TD
1950	NYG	10	7	126	703	**5.6**	74	4	4	30	7.5	21	0
1951	NYG	12	10	**271**	**971**	3.6	**80**	**7**	5	19	3.8	8	0
1952	NYG	11	11	**183**	748	4.1	75	5	11	36	3.3	14	0
1953	NYG	12	9	101	206	2.0	15	2	26	233	9.0	31	1
1954	NYG	12	11	135	555	4.1	47	2	**28**	**352**	**12.6**	**83**	**3**
1955	NYG	6	2	30	109	3.6	29	0	1	2	2.0	2	0
Career		63	50	846	3,292	3.9	80	20	75	672	9.0	83	4
