= Eddie Price III =

American politician in Louisiana (born 1953)

Edward Joseph Price III (Note: Eddie Price III, his father, and his paternal grandfather all share the same full name. His father was widely known simply as "Eddie Price" during his football career. During the time Eddie Price III played football, some newspaper reports referred to him as "Eddie Price Jr.") (born October 1952) is an American former politician in Louisiana who served as the mayor of Mandeville in St. Tammany Parish. After first being elected in April 1996, he resigned from office in October 2009 while under indictment for perjury. He later served 40 months in prison on charges of income tax evasion and corruption.

== Background ==
Price was born in New Orleans, Louisiana. Price attended Jesuit High School in New Orleans and played football there. He then played college football for the Tulane Green Wave football team like his father, Eddie Price, who went on to play in the National Football League (NFL) with the New York Giants. Eddie Price III was a two-year letterman in football at Tulane, for the 1972 and 1973 seasons.

== Political career ==
Price was first elected mayor of Mandeville, Louisiana, in 1996 after serving on the Mandeville City Council for a 16-year period characterized by exponential growth as well as administration largely free of controversy. Price succeeded a fellow Republican, Paul Spitzfaden, a three-term Mandeville mayor.

=== Causeway accident ===
During his fourth term as mayor in 2008, Price became increasingly surrounded by scandals, one of them involving an early morning accident on April 22, when Price drove a city-owned luxury sport utility vehicle (SUV) into a tollbooth at the north end of the Lake Pontchartrain Causeway; he admitted that he had been drinking alcohol, but the failure of the causeway police to give the mayor a field sobriety test, along with the failure of the police to issue a traffic ticket until two weeks later when the story was in the hands of news reporters, augmented the controversy.

=== Failure of recall petition ===
Price gave up the keys to the city SUV in June 2008. In February 2009, a petition to recall Price from the mayoralty failed to collect enough signatures prior to its deadline. Soon after failure of the recall—and on the same day (March 6, 2009) as the inauguration of a city vehicle policy which Councilwoman Trilby Lenfant criticized as deficient in accountability—Price again began driving the city's SUV, which, according to Cindy Chang in the New Orleans Times-Picayune,

remains fitted with illegal "ghost" license plates—untraceable plates intended for use by undercover officers—until the arrival of a new public plate.

=== Indictment ===
On August 13, 2009, Price was indicted for perjury in a case against Gary Kopp, owner of SpeeDee Oil Change & Tune-Up Company. Price maintained his innocence and refused to resign even as the Times-Picayune editorially urged him to do so. Instead, he announced plans to select a new police chief, whereupon the Times-Picayune published a second editorial calling for him to resign. On August 27, 2009, for the second year in a row the Mandeville City Council gave no raises to Price and his department heads but did grant raises up to 5 percent for others on the city payroll. At his arraignment on September 3, backed by his attorney Ralph Whalen, Price pleaded innocent. In the same month a grand jury began investigating allegations of corruption in Mandeville city government, including council members; on September 25 the Times-Picayune claimed that the implicit reason for the investigation "is thought to be" focused on Price. The next day, the newspaper—positing that the council members "were testifying before a grand jury investigating possible criminal wrongdoing by Mayor Eddie Price"—left less to read between the lines.

=== Resignation ===
On October 9, 2009, Price resigned as mayor, supposedly in the context of a plea bargain with law-enforcement authorities—the Times-Picayune, then editorializing:

. . . what's most notable is not that the disgraced politician finally resigned, but that it took him so long.

The Mandeville City Council set about to choose an interim mayor.

On October 16, 2009, Price pleaded guilty to tax evasion and depriving citizens of honest services through mail fraud. He was to be sentenced on January 28, 2010. On October 17, 2009, Edward "Buddy" Lyons, having been chosen by the Mandeville City Council, was sworn in as interim mayor of Mandeville. Lyons (born 1929) is a former mayor of Houma, president of Terrebonne Parish, and member of the Terrebonne Parish police jury. After retiring to Mandeville, he served for 5 months on the Mandeville City Council in 2000 to complete the unexpired term of Jack McGuire. Lyons, in applying to be interim mayor, agreed not to be a candidate in the March 27, 2010, special election to select a mayor to complete the term to which Price had been elected and which ends in 2012. The hotly contested election was won by Republican Donald Villere in a 3-vote majority over Republican Trilby Lenfant, 1,372 votes to 1,369.

=== Conviction ===
On June 17, 2010, Judge Martin Feldman sentenced Price in U.S. district court in New Orleans on charges of income tax evasion as well as corruption. The sentence was for 64 months to commence on August 12, 2010. Price continued to face sentencing for the perjury charges. Two days before Price's sentence was to begin, Feldman granted a delay of the start of the prison term until September 11, 2010. On September 29, 2010, Feldman reset the start of the prison term to October 27, 2010 and shortened it to 40 months. The U.S. Attorney's Office agreed Price should be resentenced under the guidelines for traditional mail fraud, which carries a less severe sentence than the crime Price pleaded guilty to.

After serving 40 months, Price was released in the spring of 2013 from the United States Penitentiary in Leavenworth, Kansas.

== Personal life ==
According to the mayor's biographical sketch on the Mandeville city web site, Eddie and Sarah "Sally" Price have five children: Shawn, Sarah, Shannon, Eddie and Samantha. Eddie Price III, a board member for the American Public Works Association (APWA), has served in leadership roles with the St. Tammany Parish Municipal Association, the St. Tammany Homebuilders Association, the Saint Tammany Parish Republican Party Political Action Council, and the St. Tammany Republican Parish Executive Committee). He is a member of Trinity Evangelical Church, an affiliate of the Evangelical Free Church of America. "A community that fails to plan, plans to fail" is his stated philosophy.
