= Eduardas =

- Gender: Male
- Language: Lithuanian
- Name day: 26 May

Origin
- Region of origin: Lithuania

Other names
- Related names: Edvardas, Edward, Édouard, Eduardo, Edvard

Eduardas is a Lithuanian masculine given name. People bearing the name Eduardas include:

- Eduardas Eismuntas (born 1932), Lithuanian-Soviet KGB officer
- Eduardas Kurskis (born 1976), Lithuanian footballer
- Eduardas Rozentalis (born 1963), Lithuanian chess grandmaster
- Eduardas Vilkas (1935–2008), Lithuanian economist and politician
