= Edoardo =

Edoardo is the Italian form of the English male given name Edward. Notable people named Edoardo include:

- Edoardo Agnelli (disambiguation), several persons
- Edoardo Alfieri (1913–1998), Italian sculptor
- Edoardo Amaldi (1908–1989), Italian physicist
- Edoardo Ballerini (born 1970), Italian-American actor, writer and director
- Edoardo Bassini (1844–1924), Italian surgeon
- Edoardo Bennato (born 1949), Italian singer-songwriter
- Edoardo Bosio (1864–1927), Italian-Swiss footballing innovator
- Edoardo Chiossone (1833–1898), Italian engraver and painter
- Edoardo Prettner Cippico (1905–1983), Italian catholic priest
- Edoardo de Martin (born 1946), Italian bobsledder
- Edoardo Gabardi (1871–1962), Italian businessman and philanthropist
- Edoardo Garzena (1900–1984), Italian featherweight professional boxer
- Edoardo Gori (born 1990), Italian rugby union player
- Edoardo Isella (born 1980), Mexican footballer
- Edoardo Lualdi Gabardi (born 1931), Italian racing driver
- Edoardo Mangiarotti (1919–2012), Italian fencer
- Edoardo Mapelli Mozzi (born 1983), British property developer
- Edoardo Menichelli (1939–2025), Italian Roman Catholic bishop and cardinal
- Edoardo Molinari (born 1981), Italian golfer
- Edoardo Motta (born 2005), Italian footballer
- Edoardo Reja (born 1945), Italian football coach
- Edoardo Sanguineti (1930–2010), Italian writer
- Edoardo Scarfoglio (1860–1917), Italian author and journalist
- Edoardo Sonzogno (1836–1920), Italian publisher
- Edoardo Tiretta (1731–1809), Italian architect in India

== See also ==
- Edward
- Eduardo
- Édouard
- Eduard
- Edvard
