= Ward =

Ward may refer to:

== Division or unit ==
- Hospital ward, a hospital division, floor, or room set aside for a particular class or group of patients, for example the psychiatric ward
  - Inpatient care, more information about patient admission and discharge of hospital ward
- Prison ward, a division of a penal institution such as a prison
- Ward (electoral subdivision), electoral district or unit of local government
- Ward (fortification), part of a castle
- Ward (LDS Church), a local congregation of The Church of Jesus Christ of Latter-day Saints
- Ward (Vietnam), a type of second-tier subdivision of Vietnam
- Wards of Japan, a subdivision of a large city

== Businesses and organizations ==
- WARD (FM), a radio station (91.9 FM) licensed to serve New Paris, Ohio, United States; see List of radio stations in Ohio
- WOUF (AM), a radio station (750 AM) licensed to serve Petoskey, Michigan, United States, which held the call sign WARD from 2008 to 2021
- Warring Adolescents Revenge Division (WARD), organization in The Hardy Boys graphic novels
- Ward Body Works, a school bus manufacturer, now IC Bus
- Ward's, a publisher of Ward's AutoWorld and Ward's Dealer Business
- Wards Brewing Company, a former English brewery, now a brand operated by Double Maxim Beer Company
- Ward (electric automobile company), an electric truck company from 1914 to 1937

== Law and law enforcement ==
- Ward (law), someone placed under the protection of a legal guardian
- Watchman (law enforcement), a security guard
- Ward (feudal)
- Justice Ward (disambiguation)

== Names ==
- Ward (surname)
- Ward (given name)
- Ward, short form of the given names:
  - Edward
  - Howard
  - Hereward

== Places ==
- The Ward, Toronto, neighbourhood in central Toronto
- Ward, Castleknock, Ireland
- Ward, New Zealand

=== United States ===
- Ward, Alabama
- Ward, Arkansas
- Ward, Colorado
- Ward, Delaware
- Ward, Indiana
- Ward, New York
- Ward, South Carolina
- Ward, South Dakota
- Ward, Washington
- Ward, West Virginia
- Ward Reservation, Massachusetts
- Ward Township, Randolph County, Indiana
- Ward Township, Todd County, Minnesota
- Ward Township, Hocking County, Ohio
- Ward Township, Pennsylvania

== Vessels ==
- USS Aaron Ward, various United States Navy destroyers
- USS Ward (DD-139), a U.S. Navy destroyer

== Other ==
- Ward (magic), a word or symbol supposedly embued with protective magic
- Ward (fencing), defensive position in the sport of fencing
- Ward (locks), an obstruction preventing the opening of a warded lock
- The Ward (disambiguation)
- Ward County (disambiguation)
- "Ward", by C418 from Minecraft - Volume Beta, 2013
