= Edu =

Edu or EDU may refer to:

== People ==
Given name or nickname

- Edu (footballer, born 1949), Brazilian footballer named Jonas Eduardo Américo
- Edu (footballer, born 1974), Brazilian footballer named Eduardo Araújo Moreira
- Edu (footballer, born 1976), Brazilian footballer named Eduardo Godinho Felipe
- Edu (footballer, born 1978), Brazilian footballer and football technical director named Eduardo César Daud Gaspar
- Edu (footballer, born 1979), Brazilian footballer named Luís Eduardo Schmidt
- Edu (footballer, born 1981), Brazilian footballer named Eduardo Gonçalves de Oliveira
- Edu (footballer, born January 1983), Brazilian footballer named Eduardo Vieira do Nascimento
- Edu (footballer, born 1990), Portuguese footballer named Eduardo Augusto Cameselle Machado
- Edú (footballer, born 1992), Portuguese footballer named Eduardo Marques de Castro Silva
- Edu (footballer, born 1993), Brazilian football forward named Eduardo Nascimento da Silva
- Edu (footballer, born 2000) (Lucas Eduardo Ribeiro de Souza)
- Edu Albácar (born 1979), Spanish footballer
- Edu Alonso (born 1974), Spanish footballer
- Edu Ardanuy (born 1967), Spanish guitarist
- Eduardo Mello Borges (born 1986), Azerbaijani futsal player
- Edu Bedia (born 1989), Spanish footballer
- Edu Caballer (born 1981), Spanish footballer
- Edu Campabadal (born 1993), Spanish footballer
- Edu Coimbra (born 1947), Brazilian footballer
- Edu Cortina (born 1996), Spanish footballer
- Eduardo Delani (born 1981), Brazilian footballer
- Edu Dracena (born 1981), Brazilian footballer
- Edu Espada (born 1981), Spanish footballer
- Edu Expósito (born 1996), Spanish footballer
- Edu da Gaita (1916–1982), Brazilian composer and harmonica player
- Edu García (born 1990), Spanish footballer
- Edu Gil (born 1990), Spanish footballer
- Eduard Grau (born 1981), Spanish cinematographer
- Edu Gueda (born 1998), Brazilian singer
- Edu Lobo (born 1943), Brazilian musician
- Edu Manga (1967–2025), Brazilian footballer
- Edu Manzano (born 1955), American-Filipino actor, comedian and politician
- Edu Marangon (born 1963), Brazilian footballer
- Edu Moya (born 1981), Spanish footballer
- Chinedu Obasi (born 1986), Nigerian footballer
- Edu Oriol (born 1986), Spanish footballer
- Edu Pinheiro (born 1997), Portuguese footballer
- Edu Ramos (born 1992), Spanish footballer
- Edu Roldán (born 1977), Spanish footballer
- Edu Sales (born 1977), Brazilian footballer
- Edu Snethlage (1883–1941), Dutch footballer
- Edu Torres (born 1964), Spanish basketball coach
- Edu Vílchez (born 1967), Spanish footballer

Surname

- A. J. Edu (born 2000), Cypriot-born Filipino college basketball player
- Bonifacio Edu (born 1969), Equatoguinean sprinter
- Eloy Edu (born 1985), Equatoguinean footballer
- Maurice Edu (born 1986), American soccer player
- Shafi Edu (1911–2002), Nigerian businessman

== Other uses ==
- .edu, an Internet top-level domain for educational institutions
- .edu (second-level domain), used in many countries
- Edu, Kwara, a Local Government Area in Nigeria
- EDU FAA Location identifier for University Airport, Davis, California
- EDU, NYSE symbol for New Oriental, a Chinese Education company
- 5-ethynyl-2'-deoxyuridine
- East Delta University, a private university in Bangladesh
- Eidgenössisch-Demokratische Union (Federal Democratic Union of Switzerland) (German: Eidgenössisch-Demokratische Union), a political party in Switzerland
- Electric distribution utility, an entity engaged in electric power distribution
- Equivalent Dwelling Unit is one single-family residential household. An EDU is the unit of measure by which the user is charged for sewer services.
- Ethiopian Democratic Union
- Ethylene diurea
- European Defence Union, of the European Union's Common Security and Defence Policy
- European Democrat Union
- Andrew Horowitz, released an album under the name edu (stylized in lower-case)

== See also ==
- Eduardo
