= Eduard =

Male given name

Eduard is a masculine given name, which is, among other languages, a German, Dutch, and Russian form of the English name Edward. Notable persons with that name include (in alphabetical order):

- Eduard Ahrens (1803–1863), Estonian linguist and clergyman
- Eduard Alayev (born 1967), Israeli Olympic sport shooter
- Eduard Georg Aule (1878–1947), Estonian banker and politician
- Eduard Batlle. Spanish biomedical scientist and cancer researcher
- Eduard Buchner (1860–1917), German chemist and zymologist
- Eduard Caudella (1841–1924), Romanian opera composer, violinist, conductor, teacher and critic
- Eduard Čech (1893–1960), Czech mathematician
- Eduard Clam-Gallas (1805–1891), Austrian general
- Eduard Cristian Zimmermann (born 1983), Romanian footballer
- Eduard Dietl (1890–1944), German World War II general
- Eduard Dubský (1911–1989), Czech actor
- Eduard Einstein (1910–1965), second son of physicist Albert Einstein
- Eduard Epstein (1827–1889), Russian music educator
- Eduard Grosu (born 1980), Moldovan footballer
- Eduard Hellvig (born 1974), Romanian political scientist, journalist and politician
- Eduard Hiiop (1889–1941), Estonian figure skater and pair skater
- Eduard Iordănescu (born 1978), Romanian footballer and coach
- Eduard Kansma (1887–1946), Estonian politician
- Eduard von Keyserling (1855–1918), Baltic German fiction writer and dramatist
- Eduard Khil (1934–2012), Russian singer
- Eduard Koksharov (1975–2026), Russian handball player and coach
- Eduard Kolmanovsky (1923–1994), Soviet composer
- Eduard Kõppo (1894–1966), Estonian sports figure
- Eduard Krebsbach (1894–1947), German SS doctor in Nazi Mauthausen concentration camp executed for war crimes
- Eduard Künneke (1885–1953), German composer
- Eduard Kunz (born 1980), Russian pianist
- Eduard Limonov (1943–2020), Russian writer
- Eduard Looijenga (born 1948), Dutch mathematician
- Eduard Meron (born 1938), Arab-Israeli Olympic weightlifter
- Eduard Mușuc (born 1975), Moldovan politician
- Eduard Pană (born 1944), Romanian ice hockey player
- Eduard Pap (born 1994) Romanian footballer
- Eduard Prugovečki (1937–2003), Canadian physicist and mathematician
- Eduard Pütsep (1898–1960), Estonian wrestler
- Eduard Ratnikov (born 1983), Estonian footballer
- Eduard Roschmann (1908–1977), Austrian Nazi SS Riga ghetto commandant
- Eduard Selling (1834–1920), German mathematician and inventor of calculating machines
- Eduard Shevardnadze (1928–2014), Georgian politician and diplomat
- Eduard von Simson (1810–1899), German jurist and President of the German Parliament
- Eduard Skrzipek (1917–1945), Hauptmann in the Luftwaffe during World War II
- Eduard Stăncioiu (born 1981), Romanian footballer
- Eduard Streltsov (1937–1990), Soviet footballer
- Eduard Tișmănaru (born 1987), Romanian footballer
- Eduard Tratt (1919–1944), Luftwaffe fighter, test pilot and flying ace of World War II
- Eduard Uspensky (1937–2018), Soviet and Russian children's writer and poet, author of over 70 books, as well as a playwright, screenwriter and TV presenter
- Eduard Văluță (born 1979), Moldovan footballer
- Eduard Vinokurov (1942–2010), Kazakh-born Soviet Olympic and world champion fencer
- Eduard Weiter (1889–1945), German SS concentration camp commandant
- Eduard Weitz (born 1946), Israeli Olympic weightlifter
- Eduard Wirths (1909–1945), German SS doctor at Auschwitz concentration camp
- Eduard Lvovich Zlobin (1972–2024), Belarusian historian and archivist
- Eduard Zorn (1901–1945), Generalmajor in the Wehrmacht during World War II

== See also ==
- Edward
- Édouard
- Eduardo
- Eduards
