= Eduarda (name) =

- Gender: Feminine

Other names
- Related names: Eduardo, Eduardas

Eduarda is a Portuguese feminine given name, a variation of the masculine name Eduardo.

== List of people with the name ==
- Eduarda Amorim (born 1986), Brazilian handball player
- Eduarda Campopiano (born 2003), Brazilian politician
- Eduarda Coelho (born 1968), Portuguese sprinter
- Eduarda Kraisch (born 1993), Brazilian volleyball player
- Eduarda Mansilla (1834–1892), Argentine writer
- Eduarda Ribera (born 2004), Brazilian cross-country skier

== See also ==
- 340 Eduarda, an asteroid
- Eduardo
- Eduardas
