= Screven =

Screven may refer to:

- Screven, Georgia
- Screven County, Georgia
- USS Screven (AK-210), an Alamosa-class cargo ship of the United States Navy

== People with the surname ==
- Charles Odingsell Screven (1773–1830), American Baptist minister
- Edward Screven, American billionaire businessman
- James Screven (1744–1778), brigadier general during the American Revolutionary War
- James Proctor Screven (1799–1859), American physician and businessman
- John Screven (1827–1900), twice mayor of Savannah, Georgia, and son of the above
- William Screven (c. 1629 – 1713), English-born American Baptist minister and preacher
