= Eduardo =

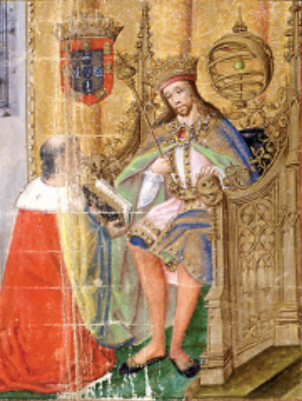
- Eduardo I (Duarte), King of Portugal
- Pronunciation: Spanish: [eˈðwaɾðo] Portuguese pronunciation: [eˈðwaɾðu]
- Gender: Male
- Language: Spanish, Portuguese

Origin
- Origin: Iberian Romance languages
- Meaning: "Wealthy guardian"
- Region of origin: Iberian Peninsula, Europe

Other names
- Nicknames: Edu, Lalo, Eddie, Duarte
- Related names: Edward, Eduard, Édouard, Edoardo, Eddie, Eddy, Edu, Edvardo, Edvard, Ed

Eduardo is the Spanish and Portuguese form of the male name Edward. Another version is Duarte. It may refer to:

== Association football ==
- Dudu (footballer, born 1992) (Eduardo Pereira Rodrigues), Brazilian footballer
- Eduardo (footballer, born 1953) (Eduardo Angelo Tonetti), Brazilian centre back
- Eduardo (footballer, born 1993) (Carlos Eduardo Bendini Giusti), Brazilian centre back
- Eduardo (footballer, born 12 November 1986) (Eduardo da Conceição Maciel), Brazilian forward
- Eduardo (footballer, born 20 November 1986) (Carlos Eduardo Santos Oliveira), Brazilian right back
- Eduardo (footballer, born 1979) (Eduardo Adelino da Silva), Brazilian footballer
- Eduardo (footballer, born 1995) (Eduardo José da Rosa Milhomem), Brazilian defender
- Eduardo (footballer, born 1997) (Eduardo Jacinto de Biasi), Brazilian defensive midfielder
- Eduardo (footballer, born 2000) (Eduardo da Silva Albuquerque), Brazilian midfielder
- Edu Coimbra (Eduardo Antunes Coimbra) (born 1947), Brazilian attacking midfielder and manager
- Edu (footballer, born 1981) (Eduardo Gonçalves de Oliveira), Brazilian striker
- Eduardo Bonvallet (1955–2015), Chilean defensive midfielder and sports commentator
- Eduardo Carvalho (born 1982), Portuguese goalkeeper
- Eduardo Costa, (born 1982), Brazilian defensive midfielder and coach
- Eduardo Diniz (born 1989), Brazilian full back
- Eduardo Flores, Argentine footballer
- Eduardo Gómez (footballer) (born 1958), Chilean defender
- Eduardo Jesus (born 2002) Brazilian footballer
- Eduardo Martini (born 1979), Brazilian goalkeeper
- Eduardo Pacheco (born 1987), Brazilian striker
- Eduardo dos Santos (footballer, born 1980) (Eduardo Ribeiro dos Santos), Brazilian striker
- Eduardo da Silva (born 1983), Brazilian-born Croatian forward
- Eduardo Quaresma (born 2002), Portuguese defender

== Music ==
- Eduardo (rapper), Carlos Eduardo Taddeo, Brazilian rapper
- Eduardo De Crescenzo, Italian singer, songwriter and multi-instrumentalist

== Politicians ==
- Eduardo Año, Filipino politician and retired army general
- Eduardo Campos, Brazilian politician
- Eduardo Carriles, Spanish lawyer, businessman and politician
- Eduardo Castro Luque, assassinated Mexican politician
- Eduardo Ferro Rodrigues, Portuguese politician
- Eduardo Leite, Brazilian politician, current governor of the state of Rio Grande do Sul
- Eduardo Maruri, Ecuadorian businessman and politician
- Eduardo Moura (born 1980), Brazilian politician
- Eduardo Panlilio, Filipino politician and former priest, elected governor of Pampanga
- Eduardo Pérez Bulnes, Argentine politician, one of the signatories of the Declaration of Independence
- Eduardo Riedel, Brazilian politician, current governor of the state of Mato Grosso do Sul
- Eduardo Rubiño, Spanish politician
- Eduardo Torralba Beci (1881–1929), Spanish journalist and politician
- Eduardo Santos Montejo, Colombian journalist and politician

== Sportsmen ==
- Eduardo Azevedo, Brazilian race car driver
- Eduardo Barragán, Colombian boxer
- Eduardo Castro, Mexican long-distance runner
- Eduardo Guerrero, Colombian road cyclist
- Eduardo Jhons, Cuban fencer
- Eduardo Martínez (volleyball), Argentine beach volleyball player
- Eduardo Mello Borges, futsal player
- Eduardo Piccinini, Brazilian butterfly swimmer
- Eduardo Risso, Uruguayan rower

== Others ==
- Eduardo R. Caianiello, Italian physicist
- Eduardo Cavieres (1945–2021), Chilean historian and academic
- Eduardo Prado Coelho, Portuguese writer
- Eduardo De Filippo, Italian actor, playwright, screenwriter, author and poet
- Eduardo Eurnekian, Argentine-Armenian billionaire businessman
- Eduardo Valente da Fonseca, Portuguese writer
- Eduardo Galeano, Uruguayan journalist and writer
- Eduardo Galvão (1962–2020), Brazilian actor
- Eduardo Gómez, Spanish actor
- Eduardo Kac, American contemporary artist
- Eduardo Kobra, Brazilian graffiti artist
- Eduardo Liendo (1941–2025), Venezuelan writer and scholar
- Eduardo Lourenço, Portuguese writer, literary scholar and philosopher
- Eduardo V. Manalo (born 1955), Filipino Christian religious leader
- Eduardo Mendoza Garriga, Spanish novelist
- Eduardo Morales Miranda, Chilean physician and founder of Universidad Austral de Chile
- Eduardo de Almeida Navarro, Brazilian philologist and lexicographer
- Eduardo Nicol, Spanish-Mexican philosopher
- Eduardo Saverin, co-founder of Facebook
- Eduardo Scarpetta (1853–1925), Italian actor and playwright
- Eduardo Scarpetta (born 1993), Italian actor
- Eduardo Serra, Portuguese cinematographer
- Eduardo Souto de Moura, Portuguese architect

== Fictional characters ==
- Eduardo, a character in the animated television series Foster's Home for Imaginary Friends
- Eduardo "Lalo" Salamanca, a character in the TV series Better Call Saul
- Eduardo, a character in the comedy animated series Eddsworld
- Eduardo, an older Spix's Macaw who is Jewel's long-lost father in the animated film Rio 2
- Eduardo Perez, the antagonist of Despicable Me 2.

== See also ==
- Duarte (disambiguation)
- Edoardo
- Eduarda (name)
- Edu (disambiguation)
