= Edward =

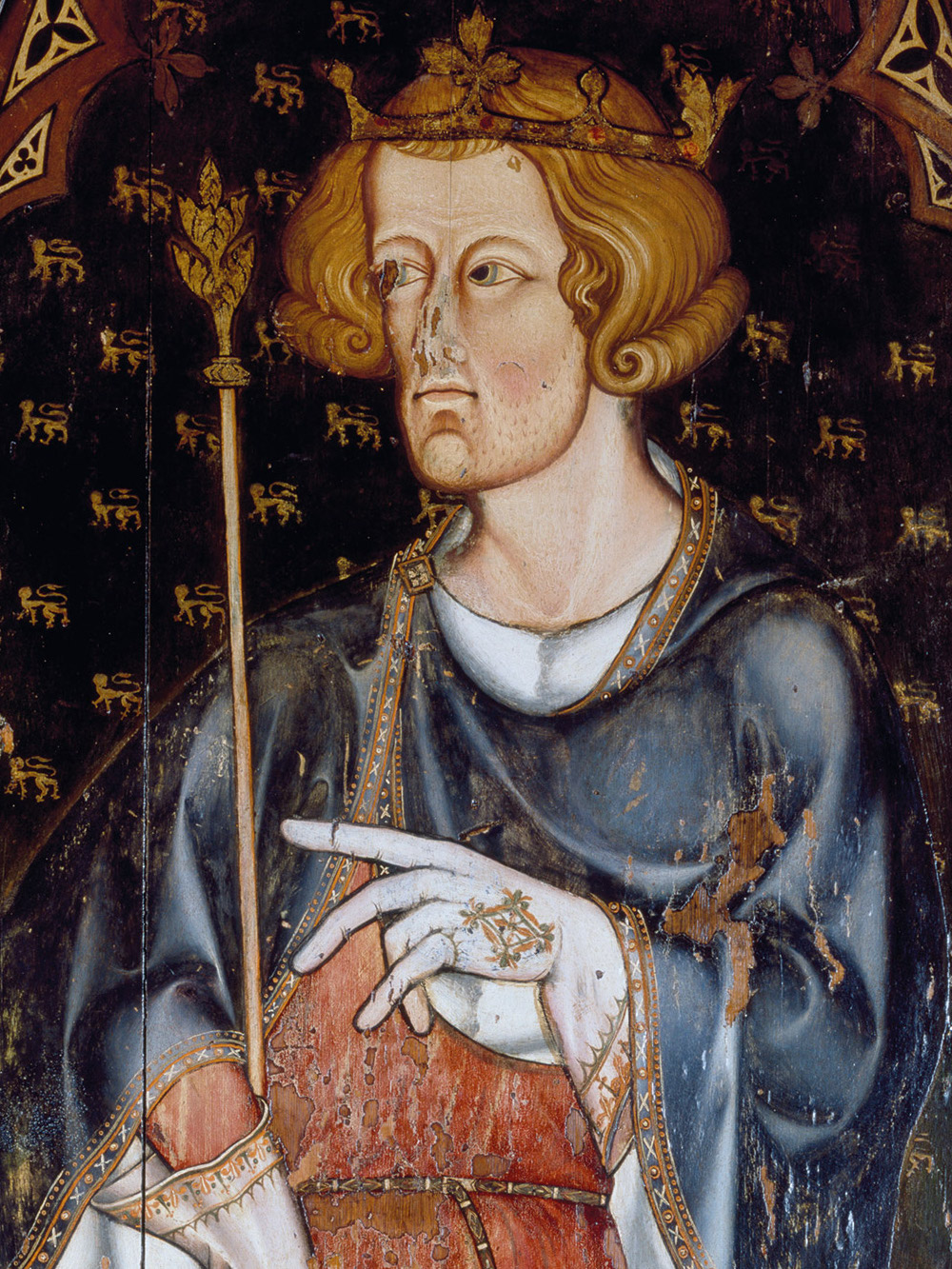
- Edward I, King of England
- Pronunciation: /ˈɛdwərd/ Polish: [ˈedvart] German: [ˈedvart]
- Gender: Male

Origin
- Origin: Old English: Ēadweard
- Meaning: ēad "Riches", "Prosperous" or "Fortune" and weard "Guardian" or "Protector"

Other names
- Related names: Eduard, Édouard, Edoardo, Edvard, Eduardas, Edvardas, Eduardo, Edwin, Eddie, Ed, Edd, Edith, Duarte, Ned, Odoardo, Ted, Ward, Woody

Edward is an English masculine name. It is derived from the Anglo-Saxon name Ēadweard, composed of the elements ēad "wealth, fortune; prosperity" and weard "guardian, protector”.

== History ==
The name Edward was very popular in Anglo-Saxon England, but the rule of the Norman and Plantagenet dynasties had effectively ended its use amongst the upper classes. The popularity of the name was revived when Henry III named his firstborn son, the future Edward I, as part of his efforts to promote a cult around Edward the Confessor, for whom Henry had a deep admiration.

== Variant forms ==
The name has been adopted in the Iberian peninsula since the 15th century, due to Edward, King of Portugal, whose mother was English. The Spanish/Portuguese forms of the name are Eduardo and Duarte. Other variant forms include French Édouard, Italian Edoardo and Odoardo, German, Dutch, Czech and Romanian Eduard and Scandinavian Edvard.

Short forms include Ed, Eddy, Eddie, Ted, Teddy, and Ned.

== People called Edward ==
=== Medieval ===
- Edward the Elder (c. 874–924), Anglo-Saxon king and son of Alfred the Great
- Edward the Martyr (c. 962–978), English king and Christian martyr
- Edward the Confessor (c. 1003–1066), English king and patron saint of England until 1348
- Edward I (1239–1307), English king, called Longshanks; conqueror of Wales
- Edward Balliol (c. 1283–1367), pretender to the Scottish throne during the reign of David II
- Edward II (1284–1327), deposed in January 1327, probably murdered
- Edward III (1312–1377), English king
- Edward the Black Prince (1330–1376), eldest son of King Edward III
- Edward, Duke of Guelders (1336–1371)
- Edward IV (1442–1483), older brother of Richard III, father of Edward V
- Edward V (1470–c. 1483), one of the princes in the Tower

=== Modern ===
==== Royalty and nobility ====
- Edward VI (1537–1553), the son of Henry VIII and Jane Seymour
- Edward, Count Palatine of Simmern (1625–1663), Count Palatine
- Prince Edward, Duke of York and Albany (1739–1767), brother of George III
- Lord Edward FitzGerald (1763–1798), Irish aristocrat and revolutionary
- Prince Edward, Duke of Kent and Strathearn (1767–1820), the son of George III, father of Queen Victoria
- Prince Edward of Saxe-Weimar (1823–1902), son of Prince Bernhard of Saxe-Weimar-Eisenach
- Princess Edward of Saxe-Weimar (1827–1904), wife of Prince Edward of Saxe-Weimar
- Edward VII of the United Kingdom (1841–1910), the son of Queen Victoria
- Lord Edward Cecil (1867–1918), son of the 3rd Marquess of Salisbury
- Edward VIII of the United Kingdom (1894–1972), the son of George V, abdicated
- Prince Edward, Duke of Kent (born 1935), grandson of George V
- Prince Edward, Duke of Edinburgh (born 1964), the son of Queen Elizabeth II
- Lady Edward Manners (born 1975), wife of Lord Edward Manners and daughter-in-law of the 10th Duke of Rutland
- Edward Windsor, Lord Downpatrick (born 1988), the grandson of The Duke of Kent

==== Politicians ====
- Edward D. Baker (1811–1861), American politician, lawyer, and military leader, close friend of Abraham Lincoln
- Edward Butcher, American politician
- W. Edward Crockett, American politician from Maine
- Edward Dembowski (1822–1846), Polish leftist, philosopher and columnist
- Edward J. Freel, American politician
- Edward Gierek (1913–2001), First Secretary of Polish United Workers Party from 1970 to 1980
- Edward Grosse (1845–1897), German-American journalist, lawyer, and politician
- Edward Heath (1916–2005), British Conservative politician, Prime Minister of the United Kingdom from 1970 to 1974
- Edward Jayetileke, Chief Justice of Sri Lanka from 1950 to 1952
- Edward Stanley Kellogg (1870–1948), 16th Governor of American Samoa, former United States senator
- Edward "Ted" M. Kennedy (1932–2009), American politician, lawyer, and senator, Kennedy family member
- Edward John Lampron (1909–1983), justice of the New Hampshire Supreme Court
- Edward Naylor-Leyland (1890–1952), English aristocrat, diplomat and public official
- Edward M. Kennedy Jr. (born 1961), American politician and lawyer, son of Ted Kennedy
- Edward C. McFetridge (1836–1914), American politician
- Ed Miliband (born 1969), British politician, former leader of the Labour Party
- Edward Joy Morris (1815–1881), U.S. Congressman from Pennsylvania
- Ed Murray (born 1955), Democratic politician and former Mayor of Seattle
- Edward Nothnagle (1866–1938), Pennsylvania State Representative
- Edward Alexander Nugawela (1898–1972), Sri Lankan Sinhala politician and army major
- Edward Polewarczyk, American politician
- Edward "Ed" Ra, American politician
- Edward L. Romero, entrepreneur and American diplomat who served as the U.S. Ambassador to Spain and Andorra between 1998 and 2001
- Edward Stettinius Jr. (1900–1949), United States Secretary of State
- Edward L. Stokes (1880–1964), U.S. Congressman from Pennsylvania
- Edward Maria Wingfield (1550–1631), English colonist and soldier
- Edward Youde (1924–1986), 26th Governor of Hong Kong

==== Artists and intellectuals ====
- Edward Baranoski
- Edward Barker (1950–1997), English cartoonist who signed his drawings simply as Edward
- Edward Balcerzan (born 1937), Polish critic, writer, and translator
- Edward Blishen (1920–1996), English author
- Ed Byrne (neuroscientist) (born 1952), British neuroscientist and university administrator
- Edward Duyker (born 1955), Australian historian
- Edward Elgar (1857–1934), English composer
- Edward Jay Epstein, American journalist and political scientist
- Edward "Little Buster" Forehand (1942–2006), American soul and blues musician
- Edward Gamble (born 1986), English comedian
- Edward Gibbons, English choirmaster and composer
- Edward Gorey (1925–2000), American illustrator
- Edward Gould (1988–2012), English animator and creator of Eddsworld
- Edvard Grieg (1842–1907), Norwegian classical music composer
- Edward Grimes, one of the two members of Irish pop duo Jedward
- Edward Grochowicz (1939–2014), Polish photographer
- Edward Thomas Hardy, English actor, better known as Tom Hardy
- Edward W. Hardy (born 1992), American composer, musician, and producer
- Edward Hopper (1882–1967), American realist painter
- Edward Jayakody (born 1952), Sri Lankan Sinhala musician and composer
- Edward Killy, American filmmaker
- Edward Daniel Leahy, Irish painter
- Edward Linden (1935–2023), known as Eddie Linden, Scottish poet and magazine editor
- Edward MacDowell (1860–1908), American composer and pianist
- Edward Maya, Romanian singer, record producer and DJ
- Edward McClanahan (1932–2021), American professor
- Edward Coppée Mitchell (1836–1886), American lawyer and educator
- Edvard Munch (1863–1944), Norwegian painter
- Edward Norton (born 1969), American actor
- Edward Platt (1916–1974), American actor
- Eddie Redmayne (born 1982), English actor
- Edward Ayearst Reeves (1862–1945), British geographer
- Edward G. Robinson, (1893–1973), Romanian-American actor
- Edward Said (1935–2003), Palestinian-American academic
- Edward Sene (born 2000), Finnish artist
- Ed Sheeran, English singer-songwriter and musician
- Ed Speleers, English actor
- Edward van de Vendel, Dutch author of children's literature
- Edward "Eddie" Van Halen (1955–2020), Dutch-American musician
- Eddie Vedder, American singer, musician, songwriter
- Edward Teller (1908–2003), Hungarian-American physicist and chemical engineer

==== Sports ====
- Eddie Alvarez (born 1984), American mixed martial artist
- Edward Bozek (1950–2022), American Olympic épée fencer
- Edward Bushnell (1876–1951), American Olympic track and field athlete
- Edward Fatu (1973–2009), American professional wrestler better known as Umaga, member of Anoaʻi family
- Ed Gainey (Canadian football), American player of Canadian football
- Eddie Guerrero (1967–2005), American professional wrestler
- Ed Hochuli (born 1950), American football official
- Ed Hodgkiss (born 1970), American football coach
- Edward Lawrence Levy, English world champion weightlifter
- Edward Meron (born 1938), Arab-Israeli Olympic weightlifter
- Ed Mieszkowski (1925–2004), American football player
- Ed Orgeron (born 1961), American football coach
- Edward Pratt, British long-distance unicyclist
- Edward J. Trembly (1860–1937), American baseball player
- Edward Weitz (born 1946), Israeli Olympic weightlifter
- Ed Woods (born 2002), American football player

==== Other people ====
- Edward H. White II (1930–1967) American astronaut
- Edward Allaway (born 1939), American mass murderer who perpetrated the 1976 California State University, Fullerton, massacre
- Edward Rohan Amerasekera (1916–1974), first indigenous Commander of the Sri Lanka Air Force
- Edward Victor Appleton (1892–1965), British physicist
- Edward Harold Bell (1939–2019), American sex offender and murderer
- Edward Julius Berwind (1848–1936), American businessman
- Edward Brown (born 1942), American involved in a tax dispute with the U.S. government
- Edward G. Budd (1870–1946), American inventor and businessman
- Edward Douglas (bishop) (1901–1967), Scottish Roman Catholic
- Edward Edwards (disambiguation), several people
- Edward F. Fritsch (born 1950), American scientist
- Edward "Ed" Gein (1906–1984), American murderer and suspected serial killer
- Edward Lagrone (1957–2004), American serial killer and rapist
- Edward Kmiec (1936–2020), American Catholic bishop
- Edward Baker Lincoln (1846–1850), second son of Abraham Lincoln
- Edward McSweegan, American microbiologist
- Edward J. Megarr (1927–2019), American academic administrator and major general
- Edward L. Molineux (1833–1915), American businessman and military officer
- Edward A. Mortimer Jr. (1922–2002), American pediatrician, epidemiologist, and public health educator
- Edward Mosberg (1926–2022), Polish-American Holocaust survivor, educator, and philanthropist
- Edward R. Murrow (1908–1965), American broadcast journalist
- Edward Partin, trade union official
- Edward Playfair, British businessman
- Edward Popek (1919–2001), American flying ace
- Edward Porta (born 1954), Argentine textile trader
- Edward Screven, American billionaire businessman
- Edward Shanbrom (1924–2012), American medical researcher and hematologist
- Edward Snowden (born 1983), American who disclosed National Security Agency secrets
- Edward Smith (disambiguation), several people
- Edward Bennett Williams, American lawyer, businessman, and sports team owner
- Edward Zakrzewski II (1965–2025), American murderer

== People surnamed Edward ==
- John Edward, (born 1969), American self-proclaimed psychic
- Olivia Edward (born 2007), American actress
- Trevelyan Edward (1938–1995), Sri Lankan cricketer

== Fictional characters ==
- Ed, Edd n Eddy, television show, as well as main characters thereof
- Edward, an anthropomorphic platypus from Camp Lazlo
- Edward, in Fire Emblem: Radiant Dawn
- Edward AKA: DEATH, a main character and assassin from the Anita Blake: Vampire Hunter series
- Edward Bear, mock "formal" name for a teddy bear—another name for Winnie-the-Pooh
- Edward the Blue Engine, a character from The Railway Series books and the Thomas & Friends franchise
- Eddie Brock, a character from Marvel; the best known incarnation of Venom
- Edward Bunnigus, in the webcomic Schlock Mercenary
- Edward Cullen, the vampire love-interest in the fantasy/romance novels of Stephenie Meyer's Twilight Series
- Eddie Dombrowski, in Silent Hill 2
- Edward Elric, the protagonist in the anime/manga series, Fullmetal Alchemist
- Edward Ferrars, in Sense and Sensibility by Jane Austen
- Edward Gardner, in the 1997 French-American fantasy drama movie FairyTale: A True Story
- Edward "Ted" Hasting, from British television series Line of Duty
- Edward Elizabeth Hitler, a character from British television series Bottom
- Edward Hyde, the title character's evil alter ego in Dr Jekyll and Mr Hyde by Robert Louis Stevenson
- Edward James Kenway, a character from the Assassin's Creed video game franchise, appearing as the protagonist of Assassin's Creed IV: Black Flag
- Edward Lewis, a wealthy corporate raider and the male protagonist in Pretty Woman
- Edward Lyons, in the British musical Blood Brothers
- Edward Mars, the shipwrecked marshal in American television series Lost
- Edward Gerald Marshall, the forgotten U.S. President in the British comic book series Nemesis: Reloaded
- Edward Chris von Muir, "spoony bard" from Final Fantasy IV
- Edward "Eddie" Munson, from the American television series Stranger Things
- Edward "Whitebeard" Newgate, the captain of the Whitebeard Pirates in the One Piece manga series
- Edward Nigma, aka The Riddler, a supervillain from DC
- Ed Norton, a character played by Art Carney in American sitcom The Honeymooners
- Edward Richtofen, a sociopathic German scientist from Call of Duty: World at War; appears in the Nazi Zombies mode as well as in Call of Duty: Black Ops, Call of Duty: Black Ops II, Call Of Duty: Black Ops III, Call Of Duty: Black Ops IIII, and the Dark Horse comic series Call Of Duty: Zombies
- Edward Fairfax Rochester, the love interest of Jane in Jane Eyre
- Edward Scissorhands, title character of the eponymous film
- Edward "Stubbs" Stubblefield, the fictional undead from the Stubbs the Zombie in Rebel Without a Pulse video game
- Edward Tanaka, a character from Sonic X
- Edward "Blackbeard" Teach, fictionalized versions of the historical figure of the same name from various media
- Edward Wong Hau Pepelu Tivrusky IV, from the anime Cowboy Bebop
- Edward Trunk, a friend of Rupert Bear

== See also ==
- Edwards (surname)
