= Edijs =

Male given name

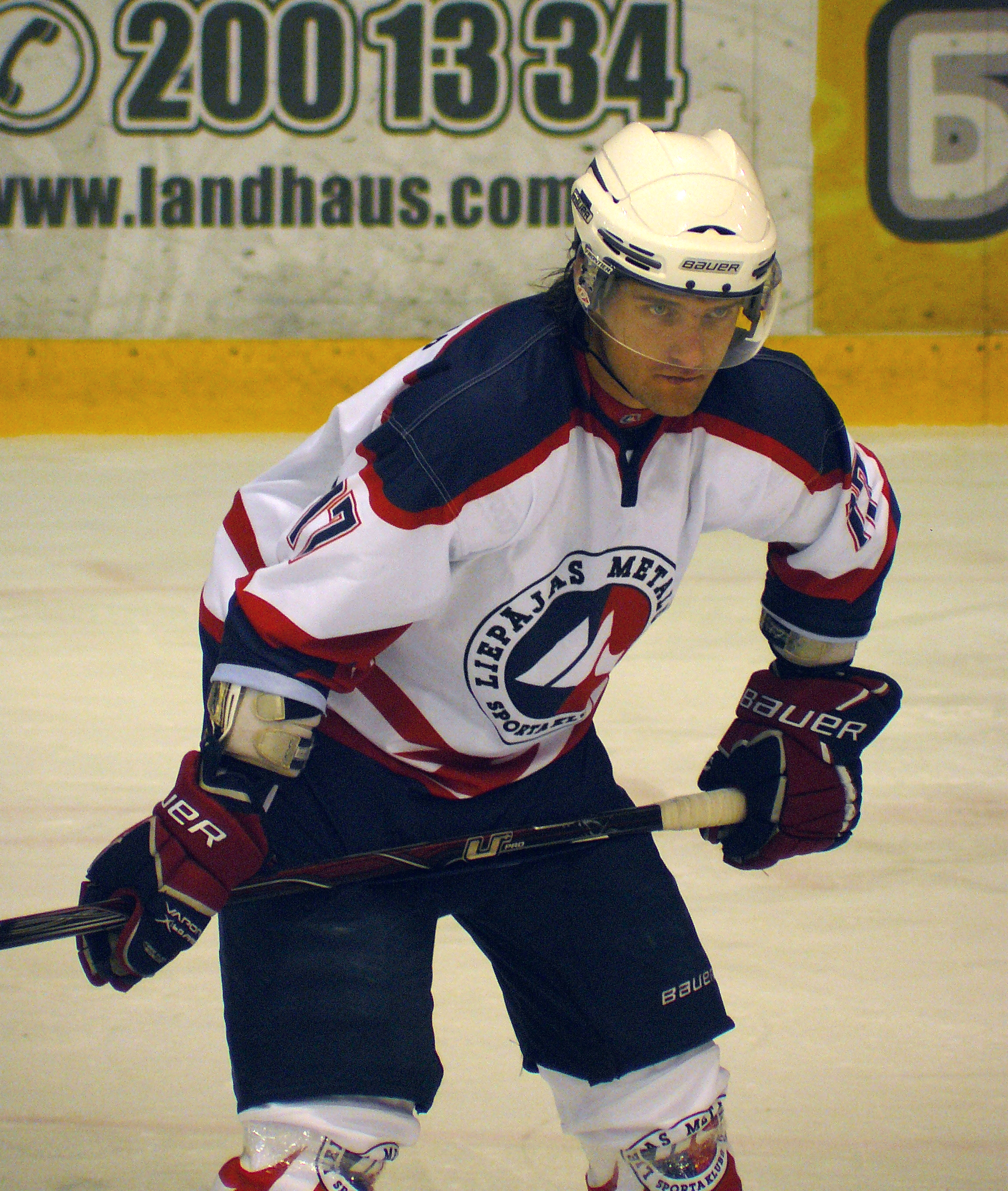
- Edijs Brahmanis
- Gender: Male
- Language: Latvian
- Name day: 16 May

Origin
- Region of origin: Latvia

Other names
- Related names: Edgars, Eduards, Edmunds, Edvīns

Edijs is a Latvian masculine given name. Edijs is often also a diminutive of the given names Edgars, Eduards, Edmunds, and Edvīns. People bearing the name Edijs include:

- Edijs Brahmanis (born 1983), ice hockey player
- Edijs Jurēvics (born 1989), rock singer and musician with the band Crow Mother
- Edijs Rinke-Leitāns (born 1991), ice hockey player
