= John Pemberton (anthropologist) =

John Pemberton is an associate professor of anthropology at Columbia University. He received a Ph.D. from Cornell University after doing undergraduate and Masters' work at Wesleyan University and being associated with the music program at California Institute of the Arts. He grew up in Amherst, Massachusetts, where his father taught at the college. Prior to joining the faculty at Columbia, Pemberton taught at the University of Washington.

== Java ==
His research interest has primarily been focused on Indonesia and intersections between history and anthropology, especially the emergence of a framework for 'culture'. His fieldwork base was in Surakarta in Central Java starting in the early 1970s, initially studying Javanese music, then returning in the 1980s for focused anthropological research.

His 1994 On the Subject of "Java" was published by Cornell University Press and explores the relationship between culture and politics in Java. and was distinctive in its appraisal of the history of Surakarta, and Java more generally, in relation to state investments into Javanese culture during New Order Indonesia.

Chapters of the book provide utilise the Royal Progress from Kartasura to Surakarta in 1745 as well as subsequent episodes in the Central Javan Palaces to mark parallels with the machinations of Suharto through his decades in power - chapter one's title indicating the issues involved in his analysis - Seminal Contradictions: Founding the Palace of Surakarta. The Royal Progress of 1745. When read carefully the book (based on his PhD thesis) provides a critique of the New Order government. Yet this is done in the frame of examining the processes of legitimation of power and place by Javanese royalty in the 18th century. The shift from a location known as Kartasura to Surakarta clearly indicates a process of reversing the bad fortune that had occurred at the previous location.

The detailed explanation in a readily available English monograph publication about the issues surrounding the historical and cultural issues of the creation of Surakarta by Pakubuwana II provides non Javanese with insights rare during the New Order era or since. Most relevant archives being in Javanese, Dutch, or Indonesian language materials, Pemberton, along with contemporary scholars Ward Keeler and Nancy Florida, provided the English-speaking world with insights that provided a valuable window into the culture and history of Java. Their contributions from their publications appear not to have been matched by researchers since.

== United States ==
Pemberton joined the faculty of Columbia University in 1997 and currently teaches on the history and culture of Indonesia and sociocultural theory. Once married to Professor Nancy Florida, he now lives in New York City with his wife Marilyn Ivy, also an associate professor of anthropology at Columbia who joined in 1997, and their daughter Alice Ivy-Pemberton. Both professors are affiliated with the Weatherhead East Asian Institute; Pemberton is on the Editorial Collective and Ivy is one of the Editors of the academic journal Public Culture.

== Publications ==
- (1994) On the Subject of Java Ithaca : Cornell University Press, 0801499631 (pbk.)
- "Open Secrets: Excerpts from Conversations with a Javanese Lawyer, and a Comment" in Vicente L. Rafael, ed., Figures of Criminality in Indonesia, the Philippines, and Colonial Vietnam (Cornell University Southeast Asia Program, 1999);
- "Disorienting Culturalist Assumptions: A View from 'Java'" in Nicholas B. Dirks, ed., In Near Ruins: Cultural Theory at the End of the Century (University of Minnesota Press, 1998
- "Recollections from 'Beautiful Indonesia' (Somewhere Beyond the Postmodern)," Public Culture 6:2, 1994
- "Musical Politics in Central Java (or How Not to Listen to a Javanese Gamelan)" Indonesia 44, 1987.
- Notes on the 1982 General Election in Solo. No. 41 (April 1986), pp. 1–22.
