= Eduards =

Male given name

- Gender: Male
- Language: Latvian

Origin
- Origin: English
- Meaning: "rich guard"
- Region of origin: Latvia

Other names
- Related names: Edijs

Eduards is a Latvian masculine given name, which is a cognate of the English name Edward, meaning "rich guard". The name may refer to:

- Eduards Andersons (1914–1985), Latvian basketball player
- Eduards Berklavs (1914–2004), Latvian politician
- Eduards Freimanis (1919–1993), Latvian footballer
- Eduards Kalniņš (1876–1964), Latvian general and politician
- Eduards Ševics-Mikeļševics (born 2001), Latvian luger
- Eduards Smiļģis (1886–1966), Latvian actor and theatre director
- Eduards Veidenbaums (1867–1892), Latvian writer
- Eduards Višņakovs (born 1990), Latvian footballer

== See also ==
- Eduard (name)
