= Edgars (name) =

Male given name

- Gender: Male
- Name day: 8 April

Origin
- Region of origin: Latvia

Other names
- Related names: Edijs

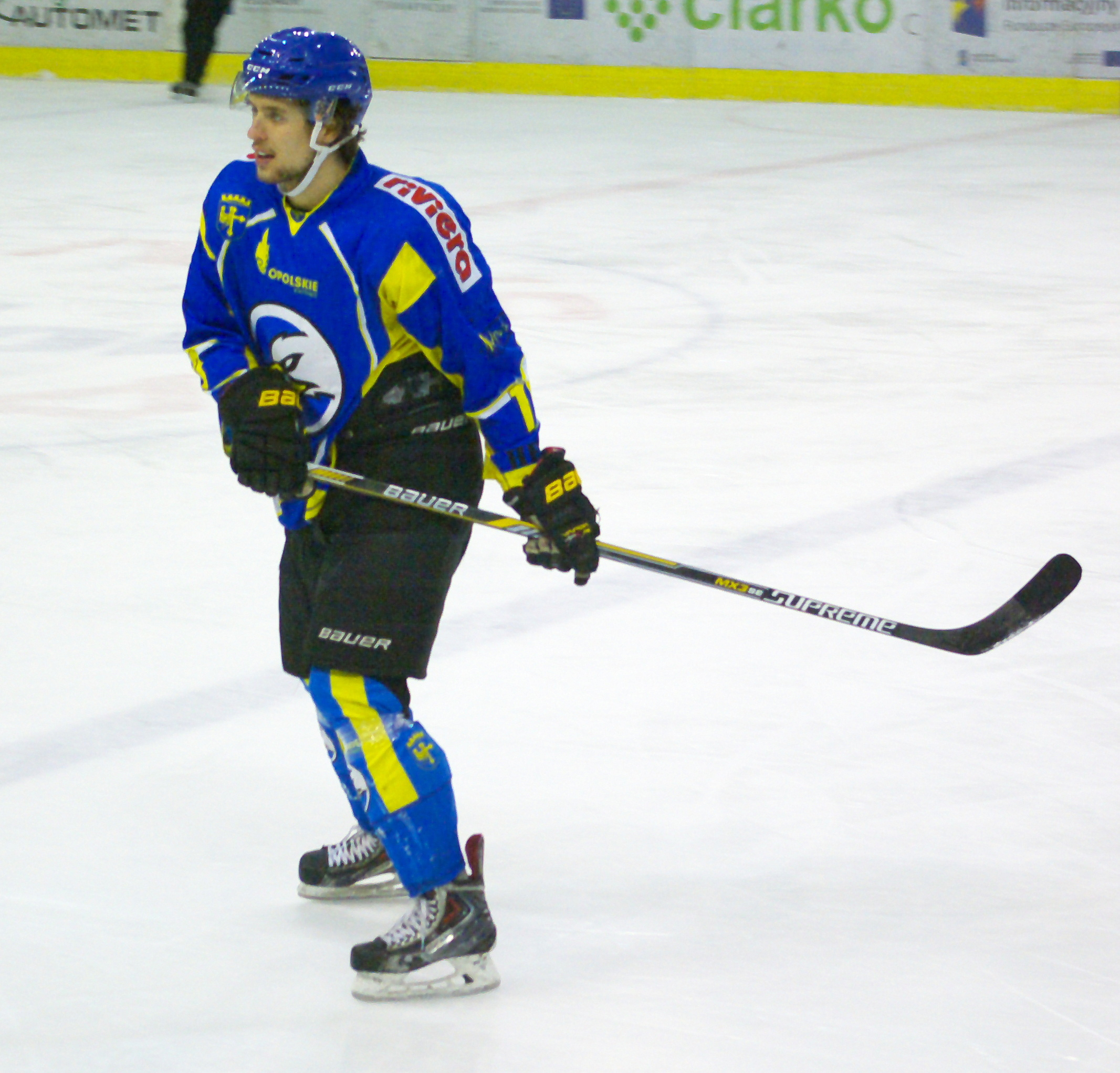
Ice hockey player Edgars Cgojevs playing in 2016

Edgars is a Latvian masculine given name. It is the Latvian cognate of the English name Edgar and may refer to:

- Edgars Bergs (born 1984), Latvian discus thrower and shot putter and Paralympic medalist
- Edgars Burlakovs (born 1974), Latvian football midfielder
- Edgars Bertuks (born 1985), Latvian orienteering competitor
- Edgars Eriņš (born 1986), Latvian decathlete
- Edgars Gauračs (born 1988), Latvian footballer
- Edgars Jeromanovs (born 1986), Latvian basketball player
- Edgars Kļaviņš (born 1993), Latvian ice hockey right player
- Edgars Krūmiņš (1909–unknown), Latvian chess player
- Edgars Krūmiņš (born 1985), Latvian basketball player
- Edgars Lipsbergs (born 1989), Latvian ice hockey forward
- Edgars Lūsiņš (born 1984), Latvian ice hockey goaltender
- Edgars Maskalāns (born 1982), Latvian bobsledder
- Edgars Masaļskis (born 1980), Latvian ice hockey goaltender
- Edgars Piksons (born 1983), Latvian biathlete and Olympic competitor
- Edgars Rinkēvičs (born 1973), current Latvian President, politician and government official
- Edgars Siksna (born 1993), Latvian ice hockey defenceman
- Edgars Imants Siliņš (1927–1998), Latvian physicist
- Edgars Skuja (born 1966), Latvian diplomat
- Edgars Zalāns (born 1967), Latvian politician and architect
