= Daukša =

Daukša is the masculine form of a Lithuanian family name. Its feminine forms are: Daukšienė (married woman or widow) and Daukšaitė (unmarried woman).

The surname may refer to:

- Mikalojus Daukša, Lithuanian writer
- Edvardas Jokūbas Daukša (1836–1890), Lithuanian writer
- Česlovas Daukša, Lithuanian basketball player
