= Grey Wolf (disambiguation) =

The grey wolf or gray wolf is the largest of the wild canines.

Graywolf or Grey Wolves may also refer to:

- Gray Wolves (Chicago), a faction of corrupt Chicago aldermen from circa 1890s to 1930s
- Grey Wolf: The Escape of Adolf Hitler, a 2014 book and film
- Grey wolf (mythology), Turkic mythology
- Grey Wolves (organization), a Turkish nationalist organization
- Atsız Youth, Turkish nationalist organization
- Graywolf Press, U.S. non-profit independent publisher
- MH-139 Grey Wolf, US Air Force version of the AgustaWestland AW139
- Grey Wolves, a novel in Robert Muchamore's Henderson's Boys series
- Grey Wolf, a fictional chieftain in Civilization Revolution
- Grey Wolves, fans of Chapo Trap House
- The Grey Wolf, a nickname given to Ukrainian fighter pilot Oleksandr Oksanchenko killed during the 2022 Russian invasion of Ukraine
- The Gray Wolves / Серые волки is a 1993 Russian political drama about Nikita Khrushchev
- Gray Wolf (song), a 2014 song by Crow Mother
