= Judge Ward =

Judge Ward may refer to:

- Alan Ward (judge) (b. 1938), former judge of the Court of Appeal of England and Wales.
- Dudley Ward (judge) (1827-1913), New Zealand judge and Member of Parliament
- Gordon Ward (judge) retired British judge who has served in various countries of the Commonwealth
- Henry Galbraith Ward (1851–1933), judge of the United States Court of Appeals for the Second Circuit
- Hiram Hamilton Ward (1923–2002), judge of the United States District Court for the Middle District of North Carolina
- Horace Ward (1927–2016), judge of the United States District Court for the Northern District of Georgia
- Julie Ward (judge), President of the New South Wales Court of Appeal, Australia.
- Paul Ward (judge) (1890–1972), justice of the Arkansas Supreme Court from 1951 to 1968.
- Robert Joseph Ward (1926–2003), judge of the United States District Court for the Southern District of New York
- T. John Ward (born 1943), judge of the United States District Court for the Eastern District of Texas

== See also ==
- Justice Ward (disambiguation)
