= Duart =

Duart may refer to:

- Duart Castle, on the Island of Mull, Scotland
- Duart, Ontario, a village in southern Ontario, Canada named for the castle
- Louise DuArt (born 1950), American comedian and impersonator
- DuArt Film and Video, American film and recording studio
- dual Universal asynchronous receiver/transmitter, in computers

== See also ==
- Maclean of Duart, the main sept of the Scottish Clan Maclean
- Duarte (disambiguation)
