= Ward Hunt (disambiguation) =

Ward Hunt (1810–1886) is a U.S. politician and jurist.

Ward Hunt may also refer to:

== People ==
- George Ward Hunt (1825–1877), UK politician, First Lord of the Admiralty
- Ward Hunt Goodenough (1919–2013), U.S. anthropologist

== Places ==
- Ward Hunt Island, Canadian Arctic Archipelago, Nunavut, Canada
- Ward Hunt Ice Shelf, Ellesmere Island, Canadian Arctic Archipelago, Nunavut, Canada
- Ward Hunt Strait, Papua New Guinea
- Cape Ward Hunt, Oro Province, Papua New Guinea

== See also ==
- Ward (disambiguation)
- Hunt (disambiguation)
