= Zlobin (surname) =

Zlobin (Russian: Злобин) is a Russian patronymic surname derived from the nickname Zloba literally meaning malice; its feminine counterpart is Zlobina. It may refer to:

- Alexey Zlobin (1935–2025), Russian priest and politician
- Eduard Lvovich Zlobin (1972–2024), Belarusian historian and archivist
- Julia Zlobina (born 1989), Russian and Azerbaijani ice dancer
- Larisa Zlobina (born 1945), Russian journalist and politician, M.P. (1995-2000)
- Nikolai Zlobin (born 1958), Russian journalist
- Nikolai Zlobin (footballer) (born 1996), Russian football player
- Sergey Zlobin (born 1970), Russian racing driver
- Vladimir Zlobin (1894–1967), Russian poet

== See also ==
- Slobin
