= Burlakov =

Burlakov (Russian: Бурлаков) is a Russian surname. Notable people with the surname include:

- Edgars Burlakovs (born 1974), Latvian footballer
- Matvey Burlakov (1935–2011), Soviet General, last commander of Western Group of Forces
- Oleg Burlakov (1945–2021), Russian businessman
- Pavlo Burlakov (born 1963), Ukrainian politician
- Ruslan Burlakov, Ukrainian paralympic swimmer
- Sergey Burlakov (born 1971), Russian paralympic athlete and politician
- Vladimir Burlakov (born 1987), Russian-born German actor
- Yuriy Burlakov (born 1960), Soviet/Russian cross-country skier
