= Edvardas =

Edvardas is a Lithuanian masculine given name, a cognate of Edward.

- Edvardas Gudavičius (born 1929), historian in modern Lithuania
- Edvardas Jokūbas Daukša (1836–1890), Lithuanian poet, translator, participant of 1863 Uprising
