= Justice Ward =

Justice Ward may refer to:

- Daniel P. Ward (1918–1995), associate justice of the Supreme Court of Illinois
- Hortense Sparks Ward (1872–1944), special chief justice of a special all-female Texas Supreme Court convened in 1925
- Paul Ward (judge) (1980–1972), associate justice of the Arkansas Supreme Court
- Terry W. Ward (1885–1929), associate justice of the Supreme Court of California

== See also ==
- Judge Ward (disambiguation)
