= Howard Martin Temin =

20th-century American geneticist

Howard Temin ForMemRS
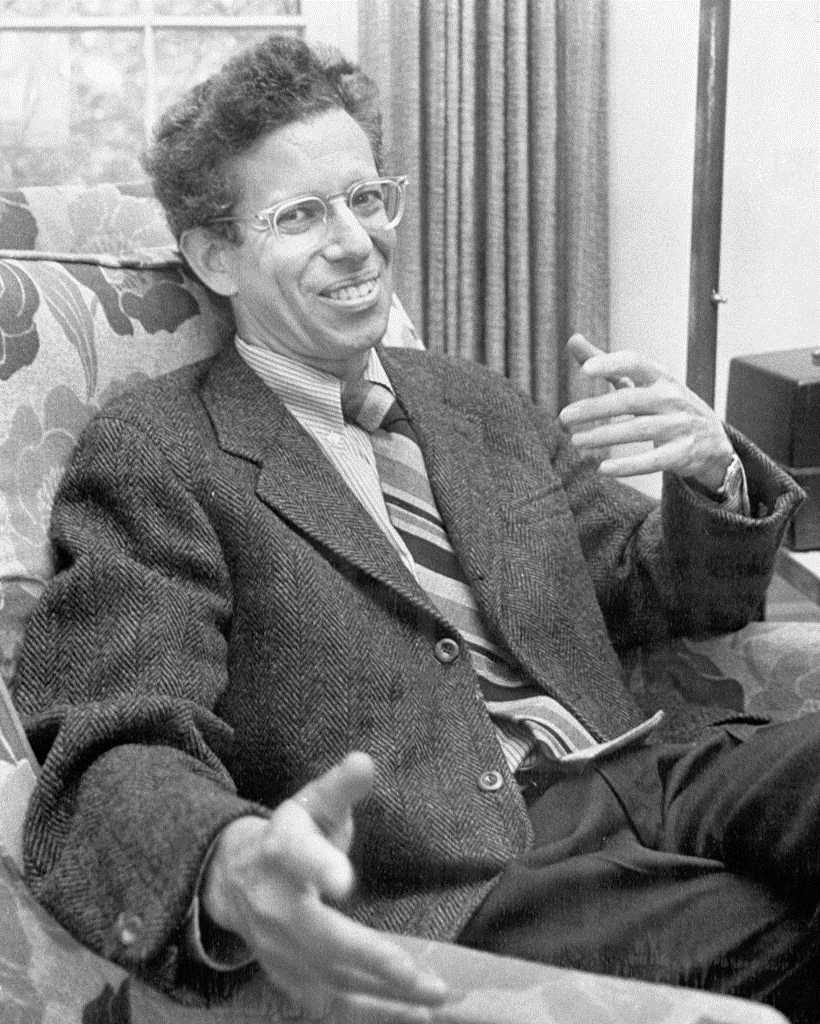
- Temin in 1975
- Born: Howard Martin Temin; December 10, 1934; Philadelphia, Pennsylvania, U.S
- Died: February 9, 1994 (aged 59); Madison, Wisconsin, U.S
- Education: Swarthmore College (BA); California Institute of Technology (PhD)
- Known for: Reverse transcriptase
- Spouse: Rayla Greenberg (m. 1962)
- Children: 2
- Awards: NAS Award in Molecular Biology (1972); Pfizer Award in Enzyme Chemistry (1973); Nobel Prize in Physiology or Medicine (1975)
- Scientific career
- Fields: Genetics; Virology
- Workplaces: University of Wisconsin–Madison
- Thesis: The interaction of Rous sarcoma virus and cells in vitro (1960)
- Doctoral students: Edward F. Fritsch

Howard Martin Temin (December 10, 1934 – February 9, 1994) was an American geneticist and virologist. He discovered reverse transcriptase in the 1970s at the University of Wisconsin–Madison, for which he shared the 1975 Nobel Prize in Physiology or Medicine with Renato Dulbecco and David Baltimore.

== Early life and education ==
Temin was born in Philadelphia, Pennsylvania, to Jewish parents, Annette (Lehman), an activist, and Henry Temin, an attorney. As a high school student at Central High School in Philadelphia, he participated in the Jackson Laboratory's Summer Student Program in Bar Harbor, Maine. The director of the program, C.C. Little, told his parents that Temin was "unquestionably the finest scientist of the fifty-seven students who have attended the program since the beginning...I can't help but feel this boy is destined to become a really great man in the field of science." Temin said that his experience at the Jackson Laboratory is what originally interested him in science.

Temin's parents raised their family to have values associated with social justice and independent thinking, which was evident throughout his life. For Temin's bar mitzvah, the family donated money that would have been spent on the party to a local camp for displaced persons. Temin was also the valedictorian of his class and he devoted his speech to relevant issues at the time including the recent hydrogen bomb activity and the news of sending a man to the moon.

Temin received a bachelor's degree from Swarthmore College in 1955 majoring and minoring in biology in the honors program. He received his doctorate degree in animal virology from the California Institute of Technology in 1960.

== Career and research ==
Temin's first exposure to experimental science was during his time at the California Institute of Technology as a graduate student in laboratory of Professor Renato Dulbecco. Temin originally studied embryology at Caltech, but after about a year and a half, he switched to animal virology. He became interested Dulbecco's lab after a chance run-in with Harry Rubin, a postdoctoral fellow in Dulbecco's lab. In the lab, Temin studied the Rous sarcoma virus, a tumor-causing virus that infects chickens. During his research on the virus, he observed that mutations in the virus yielded alterations in the structural characteristics of the infected cell – thus, integration into the cell's genome was occurring. As part of his doctoral thesis, Temin stated that the Rous Sarcoma Virus has "some kind of close relationship with the genome of the infected cell". Following receiving his doctorate, Temin continued to work in Dulbecco's lab as a postdoctoral fellow.

In 1960, the McArdle Laboratory for Cancer Research at the University of Wisconsin–Madison recruited Temin as a virologist; a position that had been hard to fill because, at the time, virology was not considered pertinent to cancer research. Even though Temin knew he would be completely independent in Madison, because of the lack of research involving virology and oncology together, Temin stated that he was "supremely self-confident". When he first arrived in Madison in 1960, he found an unprepared laboratory in the basement of a rundown building with an office that could be considered a closet. Until a more suitable laboratory could be prepared, he continued his research with RSV at a friend's laboratory at the University of Illinois. Later that year, he returned to Madison, continued his RSV research in his own lab, and began his position as an assistant professor.

While studying the Rous sarcoma virus at UW-Madison, Temin began to refer to the genetic material that the virus introduced to the cells, the "provirus". Using the antibiotic, actinomycin D, which inhibits the expression of DNA, he determined that the provirus was DNA or was located on the cell's DNA. These results implied that the infecting Rous sarcoma virus was somehow generating complementary double-stranded DNA. Temin's description of how tumor viruses act on the genetic material of the cell through reverse transcription was revolutionary. This upset the widely held belief at the time of a popularized version of the "Central Dogma" of molecular biology posited by Nobel laureate Francis Crick, one of the co-discoverers of the structure of DNA (along with James Watson and Rosalind Franklin). Crick had claimed only that sequence information cannot flow out of protein into DNA or RNA, but he was commonly interpreted as saying that information flows exclusively from DNA to RNA to protein . Many highly respected scientists disregarded his work and declared it impossible. Despite the lack of support from the scientific community, Temin continued to search for evidence to support his idea. In 1969, Temin and a postdoctoral fellow, Satoshi Mizutani, began searching for the enzyme that was responsible for the phenomenon of viral RNA being transferred into proviral DNA. Later that year, Temin showed that certain tumor viruses carried the enzymatic ability to reverse the flow of information from RNA back to DNA using reverse transcriptase. Reverse transcriptase was also independently and simultaneously discovered in association with the murine leukemia virus by David Baltimore at the Massachusetts Institute of Technology. In 1975, Baltimore and Temin shared the Nobel Prize of Physiology or Medicine. Both scientists completed their initial work with RNA-dependent DNA polymerase with the Rous sarcoma virus.

The discovery of reverse transcriptase is one of the most important of the modern era of medicine, as reverse transcriptase is the central enzyme in several widespread viral diseases such as AIDS and Hepatitis B. Reverse transcriptase is also an important component of several important techniques in molecular biology, such as the reverse transcription polymerase chain reaction, and diagnostic medicine.

=== Mentoring ===
Temin has mentored some PhD students, including Edward F. Fritsch, co-author of one of the most influential books in molecular biology: Molecular Cloning: A Laboratory Manual

=== Awards and honors ===
Temin was a member of the American Academy of Arts and Sciences (1973), the United States National Academy of Sciences (1974), and the American Philosophical Society (1978). In 1992 Temin received the National Medal of Science. Temin was elected a Foreign Member of the Royal Society (ForMemRS) in 1988.

Following winning the Nobel Prize, Temin focused his research mainly on studying the viral sequences that control the packaging of viral RNA, developing a new vaccine for HIV, and studying the mechanisms of retroviral variation.

== Life and career post-Nobel Prize ==
After receiving the Nobel Prize in 1975, Temin went from a rebel in the scientific community to a highly respected researcher. Temin began receiving international recognition for his work, and used his newly acquired fame to improve the world. An example of this was in October 1976; Temin helped scientists in the Soviet Union that were targeted by the KGB, the secret police in the Soviet Union. The Jewish Soviet scientists had been stripped of their jobs and oppressed after requesting visas to emigrate to Israel. Temin made it his mission to personally visit the scientists and their families. He gave them gifts that could be resold to help them financially, and he gave the scientists copies of scientific journals, which had been banned by the KGB. On one occasion, Howard Temin gave a lecture to some of the Jewish Soviet scientists in someone's home. The next morning, almost all of scientists that had attended the lecture were arrested. After they were released, Temin tape-recorded one of the scientist's account of the event and gave the tape to newspapers in the United States so that the situation that Jewish scientists were facing would be publicized.

Another example of Temin trying to improve the world was at the Nobel Prize reception. After receiving the Nobel Prize from King Carl Gustav of Sweden; Temin addressed the smokers in the audience, which included the Queen of Denmark, saying he was "outraged that one major measure available to prevent much cancer, namely the cessation of smoking, had not been more widely adopted". He had also insisted that the ashtray located on the laureates' table be removed.

After winning the Nobel Prize, Temin also became more active in the scientific community outside of research. He was involved in over 14 scientific journals. In 1979, he became an advisory member for the director of the National Institute of Health (NIH) and a member of the human gene therapy subgroup of the recombinant DNA advisory committee. He was also a member of the National Cancer Advisory Board, and the chairman of the AIDS subcommittee. At the National Institute of Allergy and Infectious Diseases (NIAID), he was the chairman of a genetic variation advisory panel on the development of AIDS, and was a member of vaccine advisory board. In the National Academy of Sciences (NAS), he was a member of the Waksman Award committee and report review committee. In 1986, Temin became a member of the Institute of Medicine (IOM)/NAS committee for national strategy for public policy issues associated with AIDS. The last committee Temin served on was the World Health Organization Advisory Council.

In 1981, Temin became a founding member of the World Cultural Council.

== Death and legacy ==
Temin taught and conducted research at UW-Madison until he died of lung cancer, on February 9, 1994. He was survived by his wife Rayla, a geneticist at UW-Madison, two daughters, and two brothers, Peter Temin, also an academic, and Michael Temin, a lawyer.

== See also ==
- List of Jewish Nobel laureates
