= Slobin =

Slobin is a surname. Notable people with the surname include:

- Dan Slobin (born 1939), American psychologist and linguist
- Mark Slobin, American ethnomusicologist

== See also ==
- Zlobin (surname)
