= Ward (given name) =

Ward may refer to:

== People ==
- Ward Armstrong (born 1956), American trial lawyer
- Ward Bennett (1917–2003), American designer, artist and sculptor
- Ward Beysen (1941–2005), Belgian politician and Freemason
- Ward R. Bliss (1855-1905), Pennsylvania State Representative
- Ward Bond (1903–1960), American character actor
- Ward Boston (1923–2008), American attorney
- Ward Bowlby (1834–1917), Canadian lawyer and politician
- Ward Nicholas Boylston (1747–1828), American merchant and philanthropist
- Ward Brackett (1914–2006), American artist
- Ward Brehm, American entrepreneur
- Ward W. Briggs (born 1945), American classicist and historian of classical studies
- Ward Burton (born 1961), American stock car racing driver
- Ward Chamberlin (1921–2017), former president of WETA-TV
- Ward Cheney (1813–1876), manufacturer of silk fabrics
- Ward Chipman (1754–1824), American lawyer and judge
- Ward Chipman Jr. (1787–1851), American lawyer and judge
- Ward Christensen (born 1945), American entrepreneur
- Ward Churchill (1947–2026), American author and political activist
- Ward Connerly (born 1939), American political activist and businessman
- Ward Cornell (1924–2000), Canadian broadcaster
- Ward Costello (1919–2009), American actor and composer
- Ward Crane (1890–1928), American silent film actor
- Ward Crutchfield (1928–2016), American politician and member of the Tennessee Senate for the Democratic party
- Ward Cuff (1914–2002), American football player
- Ward Cunningham (born 1949), American computer programmer
- Ward Darley (1903–1979), American educator and physician
- Ward Edmonds (1908–1930), American pole vaulter
- Ward Edwards (1927–2005), American psychologist
- Ward Edwards (politician) (born 1930), American politician and member of the Georgia House of Representatives for the Democratic party
- Ward Elcock (born 1947), Canadian civil servant
- Ward Elliott (1937–2022), American political scientist and professor
- Ward V. Evans (c. 1880–1957), chemist and professor at Northwestern University
- Ward Farnsworth (born 1967), dean of the University of Texas School of Law
- Ward Forrest (born 1954), American soccer player
- Hoot Gibson (basketball) (1921–1958; born Ward B. Gibson Jr.), American professional basketball player
- Ward Goodenough (1919–2013), American anthropologist
- Ward J. M. Hagemeijer, American author
- Ward Hawkins (1912–1990), American author
- Ward Haylett (1895–1990), coach of track and field at Kansas State University
- Ward Hermans (1897–1992), Belgian Flemish nationalist politician and writer
- Ward Hunt (1810–1886), American jurist and politician
- Ward M. Hussey (1920–2009), American lawyer
- Ward Jones, South African scholar
- Ward Just (1935–2019), American writer
- Ward Keeler, American anthropologist
- Ward Kimball (1914–2002), American animator for the Walt Disney Studios
- Ward Lambert (1888–1958), American basketball and baseball coach
- Ward Hill Lamon (1828–1893), American personal friend and self-appointed bodyguard of Abraham Lincoln
- Ward Lernout (born 1931), Flemish painter
- Ward Maule (1833–1913), Indian-born English clergyman and cricketer
- Ward McAllister (1827–1895), American attorney
- Ward McAllister (actor) (1891–1981), American film actor
- Ward McIntyre (1930–2007), American television and radio personality
- Ward McLanahan (1883–1974), American track and field athlete
- Ward Meese (1897–1968), American football player
- Ward Melville (1887–1977), American philanthropist and businessman
- Ward Miller (1902–1984), American politician and member of the U.S. House of Representatives for the Republican party
- Ward Miller (baseball) (1884–1958), American professional baseball player
- Ward Moore (1903–1978), working name of American writer Joseph Ward Moore
- Ward Morehouse (1895–1966), American theater critic
- Ward Morehouse (activist) (1929–2012), Indian anti-corporate activist
- Ward Morehouse III (1945–2019), American author and playwright
- Ward O'Neill (born 1951), Australian illustrator and caricaturist
- Ward B. Pafford (1911–2011), fourth president of the University of West Georgia
- H. Ward Page (1876–1949), American football coach
- Ward Perry (born 1970), Canadian voice actor
- William Ward Pigman (1910–1977), American biologist and suspected Soviet spy, also known as Ward Pigman
- Ward Pinkett (1906–1937), American jazz trumpeter
- Ward Plummer (1940–2020), American physicist
- Ward Prentice (1886–1969), Australian rugby player
- Ward Preston (1966–1997), American production designer and art director
- Ward W. Reese (1870–1927), American college football coach and reverend of the Episcopal Church
- Ward Ritchie (1905–1996), American printer and writer
- Ward Russell (born 1978), American cinematographer
- Ward Stamer, Canadian politician
- Ward Sutherland, Canadian Politician
- Ward Sutton, American illustrator
- Ward Swingle (1927–2015), American vocalist and jazz musician
- Ward Sylvester, American producer
- Ward Thomas (television executive) (1923–2019), British television executive
- Ward van der Harst (born 1988), Dutch EDM producer and DJ, half of W&W
- Ward Walsh (born 1947), American football player
- Ward Wellington Ward (1875–1932), American architect
- Ward Weaver III (born 1963), American convicted murderer and rapist
- Ward Wettlaufer (1935–2016), American amateur golfer
- Ward Whitt (born 1942), American professor of operations research and management sciences
- Ward Williams (1923–2005), American professional basketball player
- Ward Wilson, British nuclear policy analyst
- Ward Wood (1924–2001), American actor and television writer

== Stage name, pen name or nickname ==
- Wardell Ward Bond (1903–1960), American actor
- Ward Brennan, pseudonym of Australian writer Leonard Frank Meares (1921–1993)
- Ward Ruyslinck, pseudonym of Belgian writer Raymond De Belser (1929–2014)
- nickname of Edward Sels (born 1941), Belgian professional road bicycle racer
- Ward Taylor Pendleton Johnston (born 1982), American animator known as Pendleton Ward

== Fictional characters ==
- Ward Cameron, a main character in the Netflix series Outer Banks, played by Charles Esten
- Ward Cleaver, in the television sitcom Leave It to Beaver
- Ward Meachum, from Marvel Comics' Iron Fist
- Ward Zabac, in the video game Final Fantasy VIII

== See also ==
- Howard
- Edward
- Hereward
