= Odoardo =

Odoardo is a given name. Notable people with the name include:

- Odoardo Barri (1844–1920), the pseudonym of Edward Slater
- Odoardo Beccari (1843–1920), Italian naturalist, discovered the titan arum in Sumatra in 1878
- Odoardo Borrani (1833–1905), Italian painter associated with the Macchiaioli group
- Juan Manuel Cajigal y Odoardo (1803–1856), Venezuelan mathematician, engineer and statesman
- Odoardo Farnese (cardinal) (1573–1626), Italian nobleman, son of Alessandro Farnese, Duke of Parma and Maria of Portugal
- Alessandro di Odoardo Farnese, Prince of Parma (1635–1689), Italian military leader, Governor of the Habsburg Netherlands from 1678 to 1682
- Odoardo Farnese, Duke of Parma (1612–1646), also known as Odoardo I Farnese, Duke of Parma, Piacenza and Castro from 1622 to 1646
- Odoardo Farnese, Hereditary Prince of Parma (1666–1693), the son and heir of Duke Ranuccio II Farnese, Duke of Parma and Piacenza
- Odoardo Fialetti (1573–1638), Italian painter and printmaker who began his training during the late Renaissance
- Odoardo Fischetti (1780–1823), Italian painter of landscapes and history paintings in a Neoclassical style
- Odoardo Focherini or Edward Focherini (1907–1944), Italian who issued false documents to Jewish people to escape the Nazi regime
- Odoardo Gualandi (died 1598), Bishop of Cesena and writer of De civili facultate
- Odoardo Perini (1671–1757), Italian painter of the late-Baroque period, active in Verona
- Odoardo Di Santo (born 1934), politician and administrator in Ontario, Canada
- Odoardo Spadaro (1893–1965), Italian singer-songwriter and actor
- Odoardo Tabacchi (1836–1905), Italian sculptor
- Odoardo Toscani (1859–1914), Italian painter, mainly of portraits, battle scenes and genre scenes
- Odoardo Vicinelli (1684–1755), Italian painter of the late-Baroque period

== See also ==
- Edward
