= The Ward =

The Ward can refer to:

- Ward (disambiguation)
- The Ward (film), horror film directed by John Carpenter
- The Ward (2000 video game), point and click adventure video game developed by Fragile Bits
- Children's Ward, British children's television drama series
- The Ward, Toronto, neighbourhood in central Toronto
- Dementium: The Ward, game for the Nintendo DS
