= Marilyn Ivy =

American anthropologist

Marilyn Ivy is an associate professor of anthropology at Columbia University. She received a Ph.D. in anthropology from Cornell University, an M.A. in history from the University of Hawaiʻi, and a B.A. in Asian studies from the University of Oklahoma. Prior to teaching at Columbia, Ivy taught at the University of Chicago and the University of Washington.

Her research has primarily involved Japanese culture and politics and generally been focused on the question of modernity. Her only book, Discourses of the Vanishing: Modernity, Phantasm, Japan, published by University of Chicago Press in 1995, traces the experience of modern Japanese culture during its emergence alongside the formation of the Japanese nation-state to recent anxieties about the possible or potential loss of national identity.

Ivy joined the faculty of Columbia University in 1997 and has taught courses on contemporary Japanese aesthetics, politics, and technology, as well as on modern and critical theory of anthropology. She lives in New York City with her husband John Pemberton, also an associate professor of anthropology at Columbia, and their daughter Alice Ivy-Pemberton. Both professors are affiliated with the Weatherhead East Asian Institute and Ivy also serves on the Editorial Committee of the academic journal Public Culture.

== Publications ==
=== Books ===
Ivy, Marilyn. 1995. Discourses of the Vanishing: Modernity, Phantasm, Japan (Chicago: University of Chicago Press).

=== Articles ===
Ivy, Marilyn. 2010. "The Art of Cute Little Things: Nara Yoshitomo's Parapolitics," in Mechademia (Minneapolis: The University of Minnesota Press).

Ivy, Marilyn. 2009. "Dark Enlightenment: Naitô Masatoshi's Flash" in Photographies East: Histories of the Camera in East and Southeast Asia, ed. by Rosalind Morris (Durham: Duke University Press).

Ivy, Marilyn. 2008. "Benedict's Shame." Cabinet, number 31 (Fall 2008).

Ivy, Marilyn. 2008. "Trauma's Two Times: Japanese Wars and Postwars." in Positions: East Asia Cultures Critique 16:1 (2008): pages 153–176.

Ivy, Marilyn. 2006. "Revenge and Recapitation in Recessionary Japan" In Japan after Japan: Social and Cultural Life from the Recessionary 1990s to the Present, ed. by Tomiko Yoda and Harry Harootunian (Durham: Duke University Press).

Ivy, Marilyn. 1998. "Mourning the Japanese Thing," in Nicholas B. Dirks, ed., In Near Ruins: Cultural Theory of the End of the Century. Minneapolis: University of Minnesota Press.

Ivy, Marilyn. 1996. "Tracking the Mystery Man with the 21 Faces." Critical Inquiry 23: pages 11–36.

Ivy, Marilyn. 1996. "Ghostlier Demarcations: Textual Fantasy and the Origins of Japanese Nativist Ethnology." In Culture and Contexture: Readings in Anthropology and Literary Study, edited by E. Valentine Daniel and Jeffrey M. Peck, pages 296–322. Berkeley: The University of California Press.

Ivy, Marilyn. 1993. "Have You Seen Me?: Recovering the Inner Child in Late Twentieth-Century America." Social Text, number 37:2 pages 27–252.

Ivy, Marilyn. 1989. “Critical Texts, Mass Artifacts: The Consumption of Knowledge in Postmodern Japan.” In Postmodernism and Japan, edited by H.D. Harootunian and Masao Miyoshi, pages 21–46. Durham and London: Duke University Press.
