= Edmunds (given name) =

Male given name

- Gender: Male
- Language: Latvian
- Name day: 29 July

Origin
- Region of origin: Latvia

Other names
- Related names: Edijs, Edmund

Edmunds is a Latvian masculine given name; a Latvian variant of the given name Edmund. People bearing the name Edmunds include:

- Edmunds Augstkalns (born 1994), ice hockey player
- Edmunds Elksnis (born 1990), basketball player
- Edmunds Pīlāgs (1927–1995), sprinter
- Edmunds Sprūdžs (born 1980), politician and businessman
- Edmunds Vasiļjevs (born 1954), ice hockey player
