= Edvarda =

Edvarda is a given name which is in use in Scandinavia. It is the feminine derivative of Edvard.

== Given name ==
- Edvarda Lie (1910–1983), Norwegian painter

== Fictional characters ==
- Edvarda, main character in Knut Hamsun’s novel Pan (1894)
