= Edward Grochowicz =

Polish photographer

Edward Grochowicz (born May 21, 1939 in Warsaw, died March 8, 2014) was a Polish photographer.

== Life and career ==
He graduated from the Technical School of Photography in Warsaw. In 1961 he became a member of the Creative Group "Stodoła 60" (since 1964 "Group ST-60"). Long-term vice-president of the Association of Polish Artists Photographers, chairman of the College of Appraisers at the City Hall of Warsaw. Chairman of the appeals board at the Ministry of Culture and Art, member of the policy council and scholarship committee at the Ministry of Culture and Art, co-founder and member of the Polish Culture Foundation.

He participated in more than 200 national and international exhibitions, among others: the 2nd International Exhibition of Photography (Warsaw 1961), "Photographers seeking" (Warsaw 1971), National Photography Exhibition of X Biennale of Polish Landscape (Kielce 1987). Won many awards, among others the Medal of Merit of Culture. Awarded by the International Federation of Photographic Art with titles of honor: Artiste FIAP (AFIAP) and Excellence FIAP (EFIAP).

Edward Grochowicz's photographs are currently in the Archives of the KARTA Center
