= Ward (electric automobile company) =

Defunct American motor vehicle manufacturer

Ward Electric Automobile Company
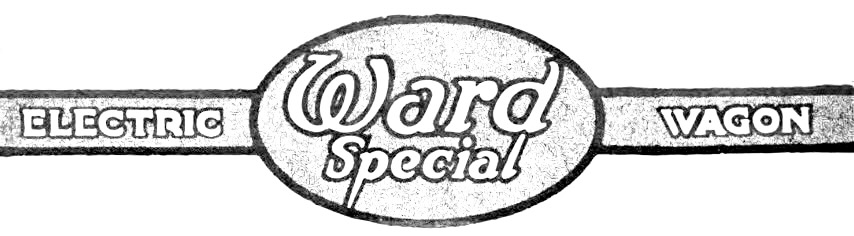
- Type: Motor Vehicle Company
- Founded: 1910; 116 years ago
- Founder: Charles Ward
- Defunct: 1965; 61 years ago
- Headquarters: New York, United States
- Key people: Charles A. Ward Hayden Eames
- Products: Electric trucks, electric cars

The Ward Motor Vehicle Company was founded by Charles A. Ward in New York City as an electric truck company. When Hayden Eames joined the company, it made electric cars also, from 1914-1916.

== Models ==
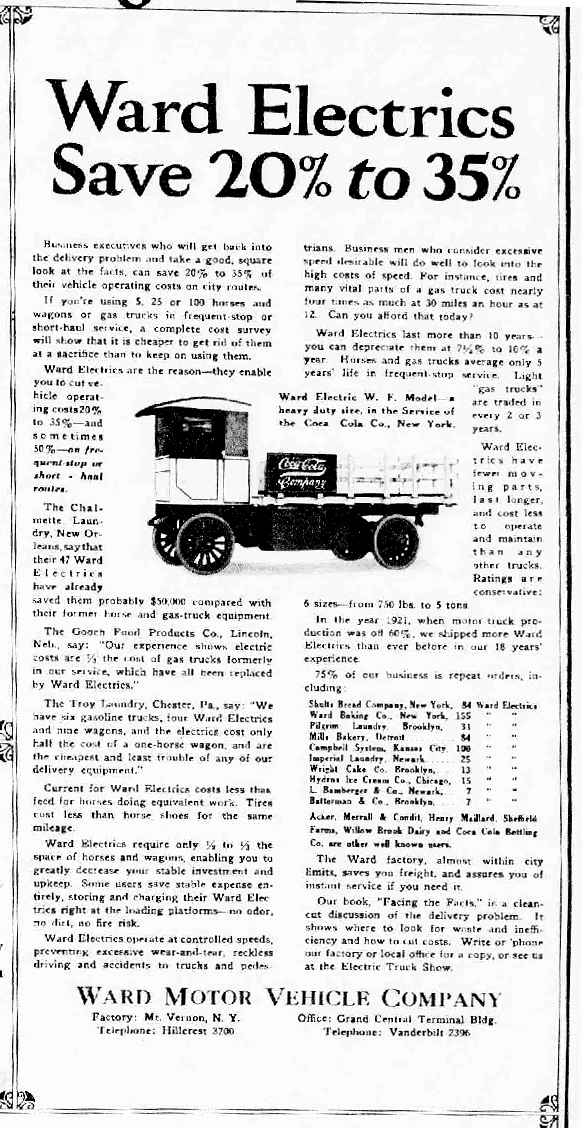
1922 New York newspaper ad for Ward Electric trucks

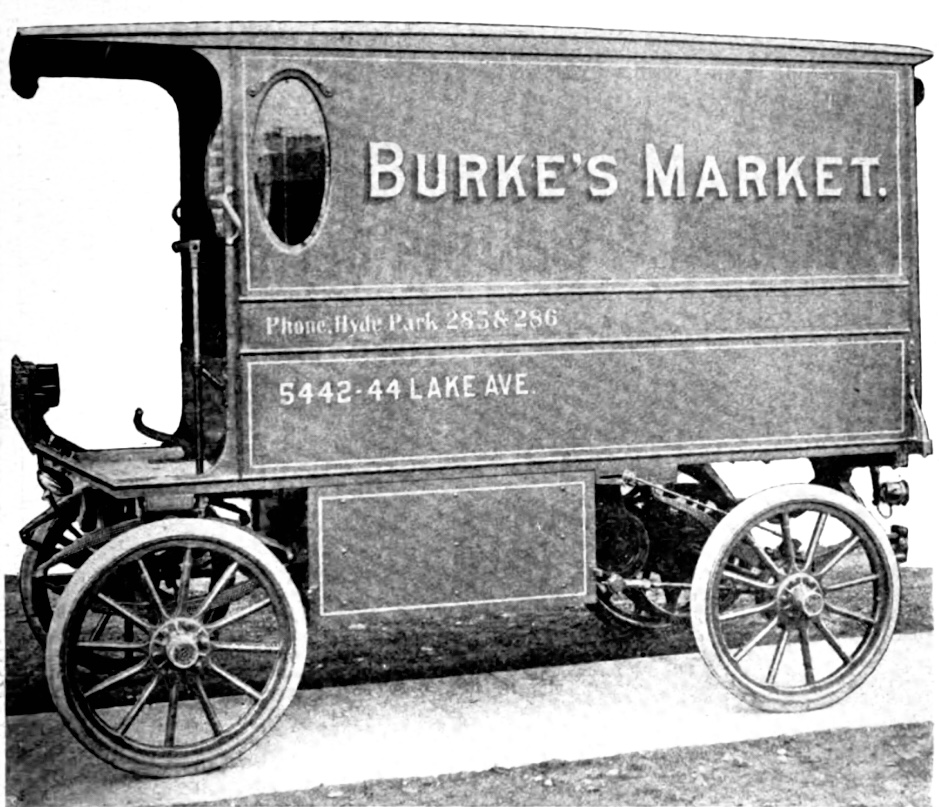
Ward delivery van (1912)

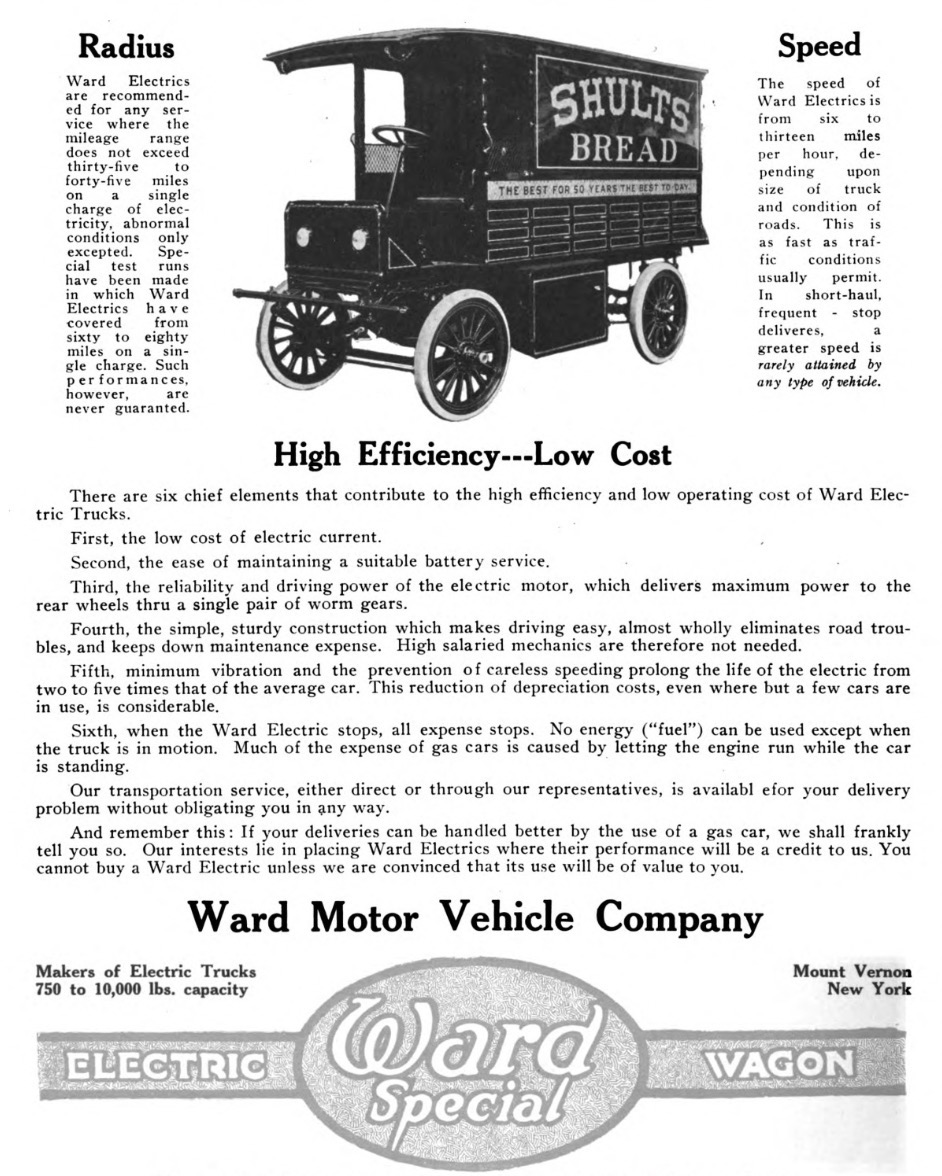
Ward advertisement (1919)

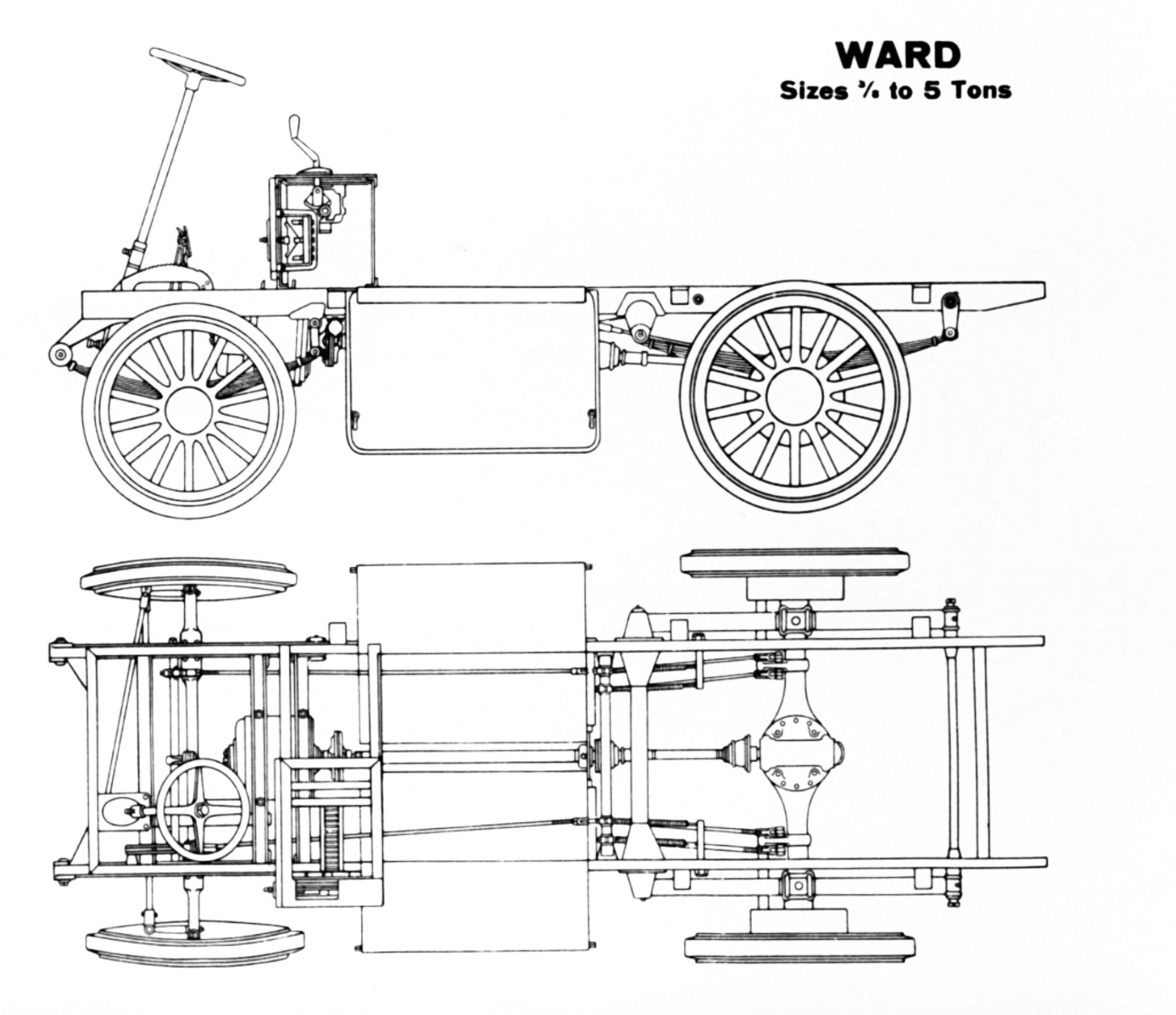
Ward truck (1919)

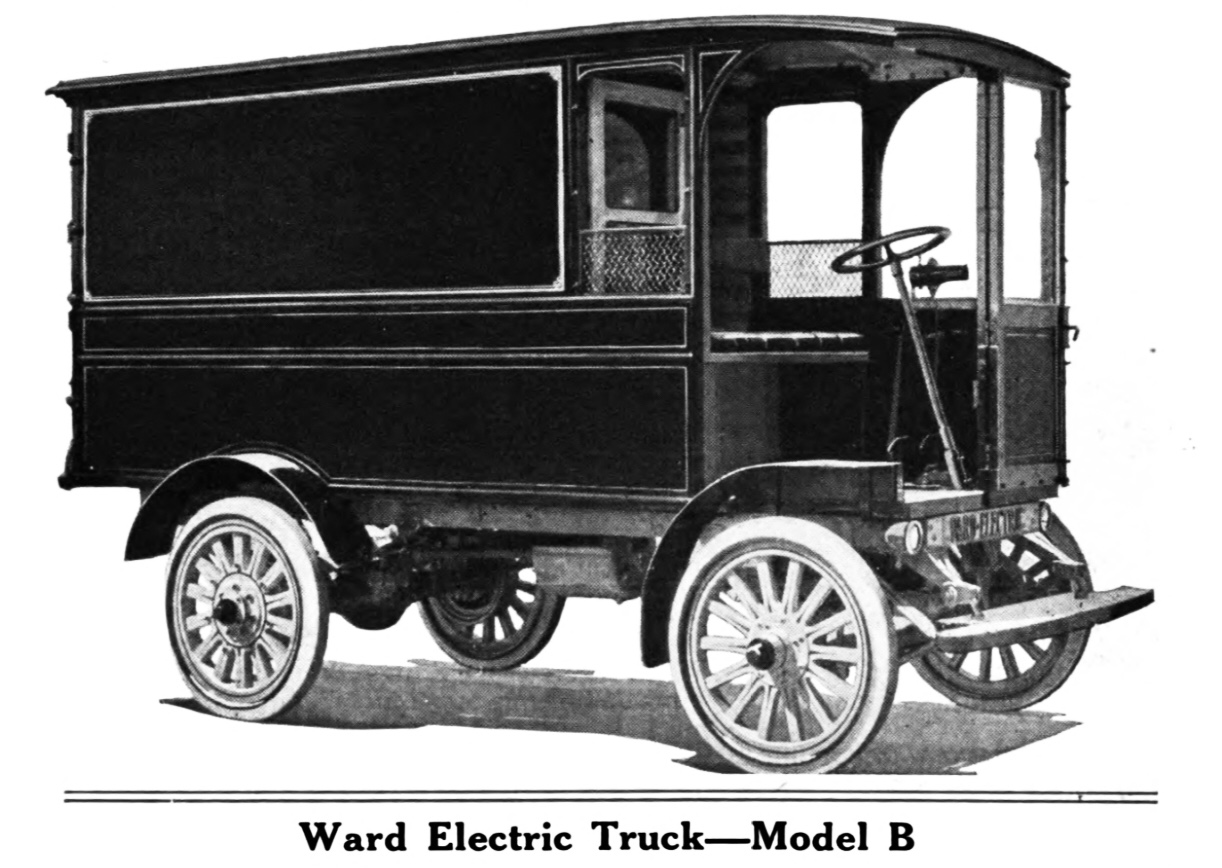
Ward B (1928) 0,75-1t

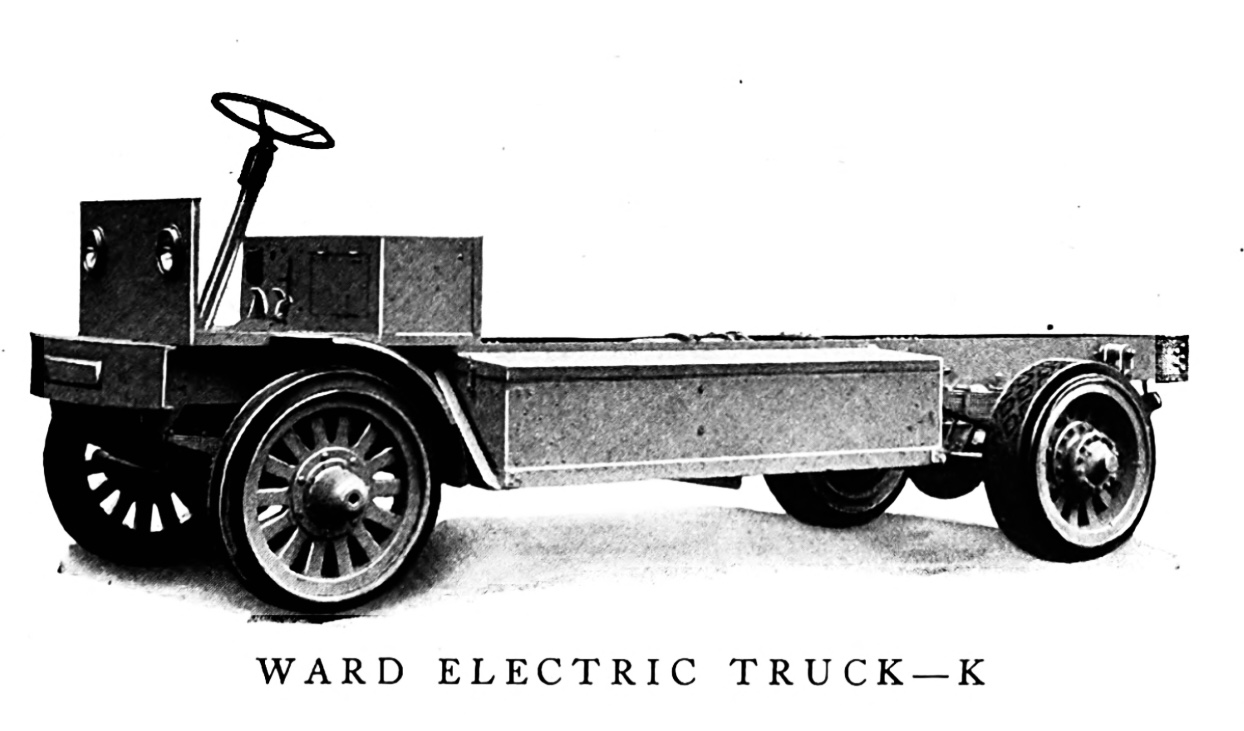
Ward Model K (1929) 5-6t

The Ward Electric car was a four-passenger coupe costing $2,100 and went 100 miles per charge. In 1916, the price was $875. The battery was an Edison battery. In 1916, the price was dropped to $1,295. The company stopped electric car production after 1916. In the year 1928, the model program consisted of types B, C, E, G, J, and M. The model B was offered for 1770 dollars. The model C for 1960 dollars, the model E for 2440 dollars, the model G for 2920 dollars, the model J for 3980 dollars, and the model M for 4890 dollars.It continued to make trucks until 1937.

- Ward A 211 ( 0,5 to)
- Ward B 222 (0,75 to)
- Ward C 211 (1,25 to)
- Ward E 211 (2,5 to)
- Ward G 211 (3,5 to)
- Ward J 211 (5 to)
- Ward M 211 (7,25 to)
