= Edu Roldán =

Spanish footballer

Personal information
- Full name: Eduardo Roldán de Aranguiz López
- Date of birth: 13 September 1977 (age 49)
- Place of birth: Vitoria, Spain
- Height: 1.77 m (5 ft 10 in)
- Position: Midfielder

Youth career
- Alavés

Senior career*
| Years | Team | Apps | (Gls) |
| 1997–1998 | Alavés B | | |
| 1998–2000 | Aurrerá | 52 | (8) |
| 2000–2002 | Zaragoza B | 46 | (4) |
| 2002–2004 | Eibar | 17 | (0) |
| 2003 | → Real Unión (loan) | 19 | (2) |
| 2004–2006 | Real Unión | 50 | (4) |
| 2005–2006 | → Huesca (loan) | 19 | (0) |
| 2006–2009 | Huesca | 94 | (3) |
| 2009–2010 | Zamora | 34 | (1) |
| 2010–2012 | Ejea | ? | (7) |
| Total | | 331 | (29) |
- * Club domestic league appearances and goals

Eduardo Roldán de Aranguiz López (born 13 September 1977 in Vitoria-Gasteiz, Álava), known as Edu Roldán, is a Spanish former footballer who played as a midfielder.
