= Crow Mother =

Latvian musical group

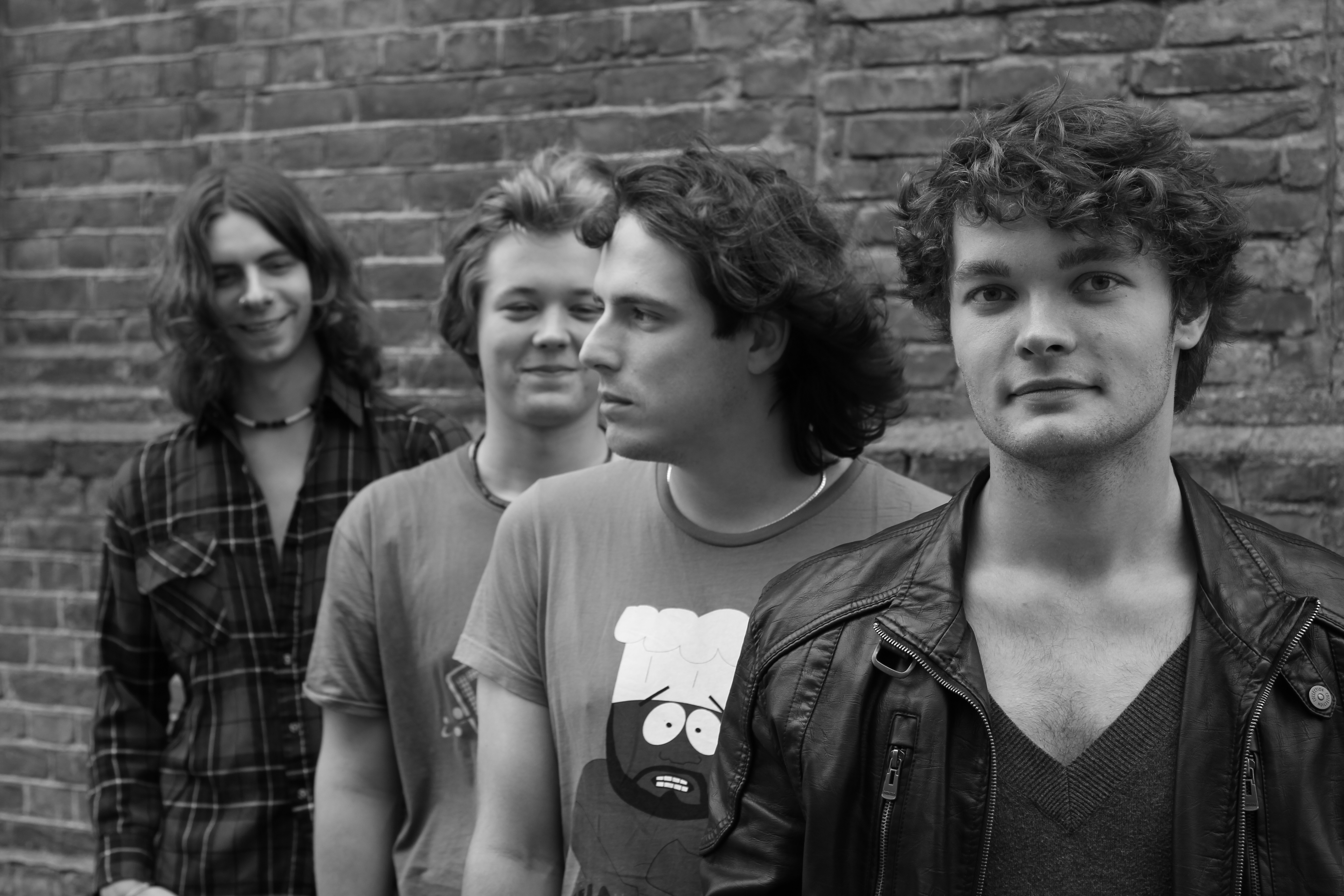
- Crow Mother after working in the studio Jelgava, Latvia. 2012.09.01

Background information
- Origin: Riga, Latvia
- Genres: Hard rock
- Years active: 2012–present
- Members: Edijs Jurēvics; Jānis Andžāns; Edgars Briedis; Mārtiņš Vilšķērsts
- Website: crowmother.com

Crow Mother is a progressive rock band from Riga (Latvia) that was formed in 2012 with five members. In the same year, the band won the chance to perform at the Red Bull Tourbus (a competition for new bands) and in 2013, won "Best Rock Band" at the LMT Summer Sound Festival.

The band released their debut album Changes in December 2013. In the beginning of 2014, the band went on short tour to London, UK, giving album presentation concerts in 12 Bar Club, Alley Cat Bar, The Dublin Castle pub, and Cargo club. In the end of 2014, the band released the singles "Gray Wolf" and "Demons". In 2016, the band took part in the TV show Supernova which was also the national selection round for the Eurovision Song Contest in Latvia.

In August 2016, Crow Mother released the single "Dirty Van" prior to the arrival of their second album. Dirty Van provides insight on the various adventures of the band while being on the road touring Poland, evoking neverending highways, broken down car, new friends and long way back home. In May 2017, Crow Mother released their second studio album The Moment Of Truth. This album includes 11 songs that were recorded during the last 3 years while band members were challenging their creative goals. The Moment Of Truth offers a bit eclectic mix as you can hear and feel different styles colliding throughout the album providing memories from the bands beginnings and giving some insight in modern influences.

== Members ==
- Edijs Jurēvics
- Jānis Andžāns
- Edgars Briedis
- Mārtiņš Vilšķērsts

== Discography ==
=== Albums ===
- The Moment Of Truth (2017)
- Changes (2013)

Singles

- "Dirty Van" (2016)
- "Demons" (2016)
- "Gray Wolf" (2014)
- Winterland (2012)
- White Devil (2013)
- Smile Like You Care (2013)
- Killing the Love (2013)
- Sugar, Blood & Wine (2013)

== Festivals ==
Latvian "Summer Sound festival" (2013) Polish "UBC CHARLOTTA ROCK FESTIVAL" (2015) KLANG!(2015)
