= Eduardo (footballer, born 1953) =

Brazilian footballer

Personal information
- Full name: Eduardo Angelo Tonetti
- Date of birth: 24 December 1953
- Place of birth: Curitiba, Paraná, Brazil
- Date of death: 13 February 2026 (aged 72)
- Place of death: Curitiba, Paraná, Brazil
- Height: 1.78 m (5 ft 10 in)
- Position: Centre-back

Youth career
- –1972: Pinheiros-PR

Senior career*
Years	Team	Apps	(Gls)
1972–1975	Pinheiros-PR		
1976	Coritiba		
1976–1978	São Paulo	26	(0)
1978–1980	Coritiba		
1981–1982	Criciúma		
1983	São Paulo-RS		
1984	Criciúma		
1985–1987	Esportivo		
1989	São Luiz		
- * Club domestic league appearances and goals as of 12 February 2026

Eduardo Angelo Tonetti (24 December 1953 – 12 February 2026), simply known as Eduardo, was a Brazilian professional footballer who played as a centre-back.

== Career ==
Eduardo began his career at Pinheiros-PR, but he stood out mainly during his time at São Paulo from 1976 to 1978, where he made 26 appearances, and at Coritiba, where he was a two-time state champion in addition to 138 appearances and one goal scored. In the final part of his career, he played for Criciúma, Esportivo, and São Luiz.

== Death ==
Eduardo died at the age of 72, on 12 February 2026, in the city of Curitiba.

== Honours ==
Coritiba

- Campeonato Paranaense: 1978, 1979
