= Edoardo Agnelli (disambiguation) =

Edoardo Agnelli (1954–2000), was the eldest child and only son of Gianni Agnelli, president of Fiat.

Edoardo Agnelli may also refer to:

- Edoardo Agnelli (entrepreneur, born 1831) (1831–1871), Italian entrepreneur and politician
- Edoardo Agnelli (entrepreneur, born 1892) (1892–1935), Italian entrepreneur and industrialist and principal family shareholder of the Italian car company Fiat
