= Edu Gueda =

- Born: 26 June 1998 (age 28); Trombudo Central, Santa Catarina, Brazil
- Occupations: Singer, song-writer
- Years active: 2012-currently
- Television: Fantástico of the Rede Globo and Os Iluminados of the Rede Globo
- Musical career
- Genres: Sertanejo; MPB; pop; Brazilian Bass
- Instrument: Digital audio workstation
- Label: Sony Music
- Website: www.edugueda.com.br

Eduardo Gueda known only as Edu Gueda (born 26 June 1998) is a Brazilian singer who was known to participate in the show of music talent Iluminados of the Rede Globo, and Fantástico also from Rede Globo in 2016 he released the hit song "Dói Demais".

== Biography and career ==
Eduardo Gueda began the singing career at the age of 9 in his hometown of Trumbudo Central in Santa Catarina. I started playing the guitar at the age of 9, then I started performing with the band at the church that my family goes to, and since the age of thirteen I'm in the bar. Being a musician and a singer is what I love to do". He released covers of famous songs and began his singing career, in 2015 he already had a good fan base and is called by the fans of "prince of the sertanejo".In 2016 he participated in the Globo talent show "Os Iluminados", after his participation in the musical reality he participated in "Fantástico" and released his debut album called "Edu Gueda" with the singles "Espelho Meu" and "Dói Demais". The singles "Dói Demais" are among the most played songs on Brazilian radios. He has signed a contract with Golfo Records

The single "Dói Demais" is the singer's most successful so far, the release of the music video agitated the social networks and was for the trendings Twitter, the release of the clip was made by the singer in the Fantastic program of the Globe Network that television Brazil's largest audience. The clip was dedicated to the young man's death, who died in this year of Alzheimer's.

== Discography ==
- Edu Gueda- EP
- Edu Gueda

=== Singles and Songs ===
- "Espelho Meu" Single (2016)
- "Dói Demais" Single (2016)
- "Rosas Brancas" (2016)
- "Objeto de Desejo" (2016)
- "Descubra" (2016)
