= Eduardas Vilkas =

Lithuanian economist and politician

Eduardas Vilkas (October 3, 1935 – May 19, 2008) was a Lithuanian economist and politician. In 1990 he was among those who signed the Act of the Re-Establishment of the State of Lithuania.
