= Edward McSweegan =

American microbiologist

- Education: Boston College; University of New Hampshire; University of Rhode Island
- Scientific career
- Workplaces: Naval Medical Research Institute; State Department; National Institute of Allergy and Infectious Diseases; Global Virus Network

Edward McSweegan is an American microbiologist, science writer and fiction author.

== Education and early research ==
McSweegan earned his undergraduate biology degree from Boston College in 1978. He went on to earn two degrees in microbiology, a master's degree from the University of New Hampshire and a Ph.D. from the University of Rhode Island.

In 1984, McSweegan received a resident research associateship from the National Research Council, and he performed postdoctoral research at the Naval Medical Research Institute. He published research on the disease-causing mechanisms of the bacteria Campylobacter jejuni and Enterotoxigenic Escherichia coli.

== Career ==
From 1986 to 1988, McSweegan was stationed at the State Department as an American Association for the Advancement of Science diplomacy fellow. At the State Department, he was involved in developing a science and technology pact between the United States and Poland. He helped negotiate additional agreements with Hungary and the former Soviet Union.

In 1988, McSweegan joined the National Institutes of Health's National Institute of Allergy and Infectious Diseases, and eventually became program officer for Lyme disease. McSweegan was among a number of Lyme disease experts who were worried about the influence that an advocacy group was having over the NIH, some politicians, and the general public. The group, called Lyme Disease Foundation, promoted the belief in "chronic Lyme disease" and claimed that it required long-term, expensive, and unproven antibiotic treatments. The group was operated by two accountants, received funding from companies that sold intravenous antibiotics, and made claims that lacked scientific support. It also referred people with indeterminate symptoms to chronic Lyme disease-believing doctors who would diagnose them, even though evidence indicated most did not have Lyme disease.

Beginning in 1995, McSweegan denounced the Lyme Disease Foundation in his personal time and continued to speak out against the group's influence on the NIH. The NIH eventually removed him from responsibilities, both related and unrelated to Lyme disease. The media characterized the NIH's actions as retaliation for McSweegan blowing the whistle on NIH mismanagement. In 1997, after noticing that his personal web site characterized the Lyme Disease Foundation as "whacko", the NIH suspended him for two weeks. However, the NIH's own lawyers felt there was no basis for firing him. The Lyme Disease Foundation later sued McSweegan for slander, but lost. McSweegan won a countersuit against them. Through the process, he continued to receive positive job reviews.

The NIH said it reassigned him to a post as director of the U.S.-Indo Vaccine Action Program. McSweegan told The Washington Post in 2003 that he did not know he was director of that program, and was instead assigned tasks better suited for an intern.

Reports by the Post and CBS News led Senator Chuck Grassley, then the chairman of the Senate Finance Committee, to demand that the NIH give McSweegan work. In a letter to Health and Human Services Secretary Tommy Thompson, Grassley questioned the NIH's uses of taxpayer money, saying it was unacceptable for the NIH to "come rattling a tin cup asking for more money" when it was forcing taxpayers to "pay for full-time novelists". The NIH promised to investigate the allegations.

McSweegan has commented on diverse issues related to infectious disease. In 2004, McSweegan hypothesized that the mysterious "English sweating sickness" may have been an outbreak of anthrax poisoning. He speculated that the victims could have been infected with anthrax spores present in raw wool or infected animal carcasses, and he suggested exhuming the victims for testing. He has also criticized the Centers for Disease Control for investigating Morgellons, a proposed infectious condition whose existence is disputed by current scientific consensus.

Mcsweegan was detailed by the NIH to the Global Virus Network, where he became a program manager. There, he reported on a number of pathogens, including Zika, chikungunya, and Hepatitis C. He worked at the Global Virus Network until 2018.
