= Eduard Epstein =

Russian music educator

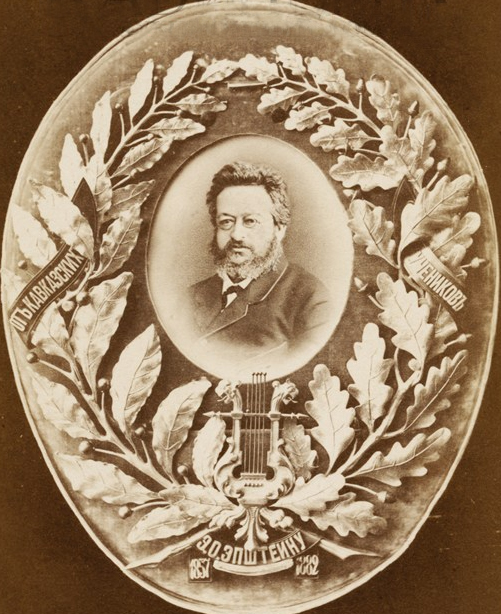
Photographic portrait of Eduard Epstein, presented to him on the occasion of the 25th anniversary of his teaching career in Tiflis (1882, signed “From Caucasian students”)

Eduard Epstein (Russian Эдуард Осипович Эпштейн / Eduard Ossipovich Epshtein / Ėduard Osipovič Ėpštejn; also spelled Eduard Osipovich Epstein; 13 October 1827 – 22 February (6 March) 1889) was a Russian music educator of Prussian origin.

== Life ==
Eduard Epstein was born in Tiflis in Bodland, Prussia (today Bogacica, Kluczbork municipality, Poland), or according to other sources, in Simmenau (now Szymonków, Wołczyn municipality, Poland).

In 1848, he enrolled at the Leipzig Conservatory, where he studied piano with Ignaz Moscheles. On April 30, the Allgemeine musikalische Zeitung reported on his participation in a conservatory concert. He also studied music theory under Ernst Friedrich Eduard Richter and Moritz Hauptmann. After completing his studies, he devoted himself primarily to pedagogy. In 1853, he was appointed as a private tutor on a manor in the Minsk Governorate. In 1855, he accompanied the singer Wilhelm Versing on a concert tour through southern Russia. After the tour, he settled in Tiflis in 1857, where he spent the rest of his life. There, he became Georgia’s first professional piano teacher. He taught both privately and later at the music school of the Tiflis branch of the Imperial Russian Musical Society. Among his students was Gennari Karganov. He maintained a close friendship with Gustav Radde.

Epstein published a “School for Elementary Piano Instruction” (Tiflis, 1877) as well as a popular book in German, Der Musik-Unterricht der Jugend. Eine Anleitung für Eltern und Erzieher (The Musical Education of Youth: A Guide for Parents and Educators; 2nd ed., Leipzig 1888), dedicated to the State Councilor and “Curator of Education in the Caucasus” K. P. Yanovsky (1822–1902). The book was primarily aimed at parents whose children were receiving music lessons. Nikolai Findeisen called it “very valuable” and “the first serious work on the subject in Russia.” In 1895, Findeisen published a Russian translation in his journal Russkaya muzykalnaya gazeta. A stand-alone Russian edition followed in 1897 in Saint Petersburg.

In his younger years, Salomon Jadassohn (1831–1902) took over Epstein’s students in Leipzig when his friend left the city.

Eduard died on 22 February or 6 March 1889 in Tiflis.

== Publications ==
- School for Elementary Piano Instruction. Tiflis, 1877
- Der Musik-Unterricht der Jugend. Eine Anleitung für Eltern und Erzieher. 2., verm. und verb. Aufl., Verlag von Maeder & Wahl, Leipzig 1888 – Digitalisat
