= Édouard André (disambiguation) =

Édouard André may refer to:

- Édouard André (1840–1911), French horticulturalist
- Édouard André (consul) (fl. 1898) Belgian consul during the Battle of Manila
- Édouard André (art collector) (1833–1894), husband of Nélie Jacquemart-André
