= Edvard Befring =

Norwegian educationalist (born 1936)

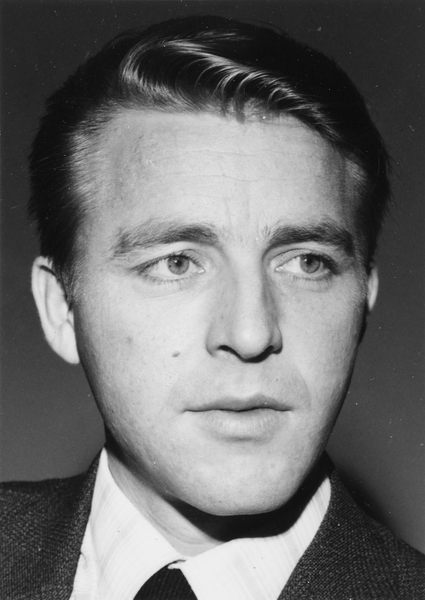
Edvard Befring, 1969

Edvard Befring (born 11 May 1936) is a Norwegian educationalist.

He was born in Stardalen as the son of bus driver, Thor Befring (1905–1987) and nurse, Petra Åsta Gilleshammer (1904–1996). Between 1961 and 1980 he was married to nurse Magnhild Sevre. In his youth he was an able discus thrower with a personal best of 43.40 metres, achieved at Bislett stadion in June 1961 while representing IL Vestar.

He took the dr.philos. degree in 1972 with the thesis Ungdom i et bysamfunn. He has served as professor at Aarhus University from 1972 to 1976, rector of Statens spesiallærerhøgskole from 1976 to 1987 and professor from 1987 to 1991, lastly as professor at the University of Oslo from 1991 to his retirement.

He led the committee that published the Norwegian Official Report 1995:26, evaluating the Ombudsman for Children in Norway institution. He also chaired the Norwegian Library of Talking Books and Braille from its inception in 1989, and was a board member of NAVF.

He has been decorated as a Knight of the Order of the Falcon in 1990 and the Order of St. Olav in 2005.
