= Eduarda Campopiano =

Brazilian politician (born 2003)

- Campopiano in 2026

Member of the Legislative Assembly of São Paulo
- Incumbent
- Assumed office 1 February 2027

Personal details
- Born: 22 July 2003 (age 23)
- Party: Liberal Party

Maria Eduarda Campopiano Monteiro (born 22 July 2003) is a Brazilian politician who was elected member of the Legislative Assembly of São Paulo in 2026. She has been a municipal councillor of Praia Grande since 2025.
