= USS Screven =

Cargo ship of the United States Navy

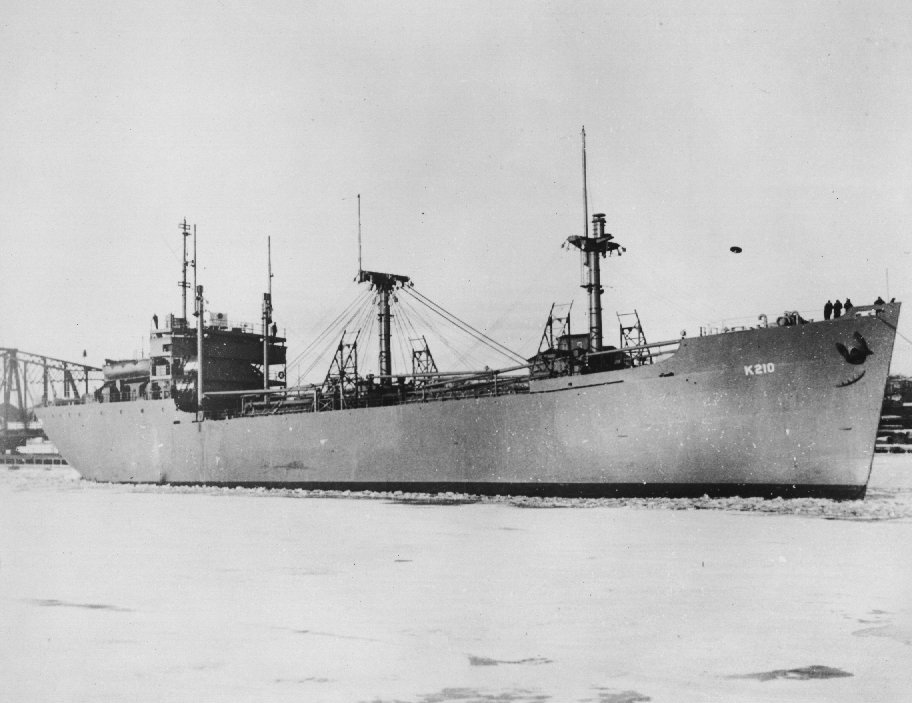
- USS Screven (AK-210) seen here prior to commissioning, possibly fitting out or undergoing trials at Leathem D Smith Shipbuilding Co., Sturgeon Bay, Wisconsin.

History

United States
- Name: Screven
- Namesake: Screven County, Georgia
- Ordered: as type (C1-M-AV1) hull, MC hull 2164
- Builder: Leathem D. Smith Shipbuilding Company, Sturgeon Bay, Wisconsin
- Yard number: 330
- Laid down: 11 July 1944
- Launched: 30 November 1944
- Sponsored by: Mrs. Harold Roeth
- Acquired: 3 July 1945
- Commissioned: 2 August 1945
- Decommissioned: 30 April 1946
- Stricken: 8 May 1946
- Identification: Hull symbol: AK-210; Code letters: NXNX
- Fate: Sold 26 February 1947, to Benham and Boyesin, Inc, Norway

Norway
- Name: Norlindo
- Owner: Benham and Boyesin, Inc, Norway
- Acquired: 26 February 1947
- Fate: Sold 1959

Peru
- Name: Ilo
- Namesake: City of Ilo
- Owner: Peruvian Navy
- Acquired: 1959
- Identification: A 133
- Fate: Sold to Spanish shipbreaker in 1968

General characteristics
- Class & type: Alamosa-class cargo ship
- Type: C1-M-AV1
- Tonnage: 5,032 long tons deadweight (DWT)
- Displacement: 2,382 long tons (2,420 t) (standard); 7,450 long tons (7,570 t) (full load)
- Length: 388 ft 8 in (118.47 m)
- Beam: 50 ft (15 m)
- Draft: 21 ft 1 in (6.43 m)
- Installed power: 1 × Nordberg, TSM 6 diesel engine; 1,750 shp (1,300 kW)
- Propulsion: 1 × propeller
- Speed: 11.5 kn (21.3 km/h; 13.2 mph)
- Capacity: 3,945 t (3,883 long tons) DWT; 9,830 cu ft (278 m^{3}) (refrigerated); 227,730 cu ft (6,449 m^{3}) (non-refrigerated)
- Complement: 15 Officers; 70 Enlisted
- Armament: 1 × 3 in (76 mm)/50 caliber dual purpose gun (DP); 6 × 20 mm (0.8 in) Oerlikon anti-aircraft (AA) cannons

USS Screven (AK-210) was an Alamosa-class cargo ship that was constructed for the US Navy during the closing period of World War II. She served in the Pacific Ocean theatre of operations and returned home in 1946 to be placed into the "mothball fleet" where she remained until sold in 1947 for commercial maritime service.

== Construction ==
Screven was laid down under US Maritime Commission (MARCOM) contract, MC hull 2164, on 11 July 1944, by Leathem D. Smith Shipbuilding Company, Sturgeon Bay, Wisconsin; launched on 30 November 1944; sponsored by Mrs. Harold Roeth; acquired on 3 July 1945; and commissioned on 2 August 1945.

== Service history ==
=== World War II-related service ===
After shakedown, Screven arrived at Gulfport, Mississippi, on 31 August 1945 to load cargo. She sailed on 21 September and, after stops at the Panama Canal Zone and Pearl Harbor, arrived at Guam on 16 November. Departing from Guam on 19 December, the ship arrived at San Francisco, on 9 January 1946 and proceeded to the US East Coast.

=== Post-war inactivation ===
Screven arrived at Baltimore, Maryland, on 10 April for inactivation, and was decommissioned on 30 April. She was redelivered to the Maritime Commission on 7 May 1946 and struck from the Navy List on 8 May.

== Merchant service ==
The freighter was purchased 26 February 1947, for $693,862, by the Norwegian firm of Benham and Boyesin, Inc. She was renamed Norlindo.

== Peruvian Navy service ==
In 1959 she became the Peruvian Navy transport, Ilo (A 133). She was sold to Spanish shipbreakers in 1968.

== Notes ==
Citations

== Bibliography ==
Online resources

- "Screven". Dictionary of American Naval Fighting Ships. Naval History and Heritage Command. This article incorporates text from this source, which is in the public domain.
- "C1 Cargo Ships". www.ShipbuildingHistory.com. 28 August 2009.
- "USS Screven (AK-210)". NavSource. 21 March 2014.
- "Screven (AK-210)". United States Department of Transportation. Archived from the original on 8 July 2015.
