= Edu Gil =

Spanish footballer

Personal information
- Full name: Eduardo Gil Barranco
- Date of birth: 9 December 1990 (age 35)
- Place of birth: Soria, Spain
- Height: 1.83 m (6 ft 0 in)
- Position: Defender

Youth career
- Uxama
- Numancia

Senior career*
Years	Team	Apps	(Gls)
2010–2014	Numancia B	72	(1)
2012–2014	Numancia	2	(0)
2013–2014	→ Calahorra (loan)	35	(0)
2014–2015	Calahorra	28	(1)
2015–2019	Uxama	61	(2)
- * Club domestic league appearances and goals as of 14 May 2017

Eduardo "Edu" Gil Barranco (born 9 December 1990) is a Spanish retired footballer who played as a defender.

== Club career ==
Born in Soria, Castile and León, Gil finished his development with hometown club CD Numancia, and made his senior debut in 2010–11 with their reserves, in Tercera División. On 27 May 2012 he made his debut with the first team, in a 3–1 away win against CE Sabadell FC in the Segunda División.

After leaving the Nuevo Estadio Los Pajaritos in 2014, Gil spent the rest of his career in Spanish amateur football.
