= Edward F. Fritsch =

American molecular biologist

Edward Francis Fritsch (born June 1, 1950) is a scientist in the field of molecular biology and cancer immunology.

Fritsch completed his PhD at the University of Wisconsin–Madison under Howard Temin. His thesis was titled, "Synthesis and structure of avian retrovirus DNA". As a postdoctoral fellow under Tom Maniatis at California Institute of Technology, Fritsch entered the field of recombinant DNA by constructing the first complete library of the human genome along with Dr. Richard Lawn. In 1982, Fritsch, Joe Sambrook, and Maniatis wrote Molecular Cloning: A Laboratory Manual, which was considered "omnipresent in Molecular Biology laboratories and [...] utilized to the point where it is frequently referred to as ‘The Bible’.” Fritsch helped initiate and for four years co-taught the widely successful Cold Spring Harbor course on Molecular Cloning. Fritsch's work in molecular cloning continued at Genetics Institute, acquired by Wyeth in 1992, where he worked on the discovery and production of therapeutic recombinant proteins, including the cloning of the erythropoietin (EPO) gene.

Fritsch then joined Phylos, Inc. to utilize a in vitro, directed-evolution technology to discover new protein therapeutics, eventually becoming Chief Scientific Officer

He later worked with Cathy Wu and Nir Hacohen at the Dana–Farber Cancer Institute and the Broad Institute of MIT and Harvard. There he led the development of NeoVax, a first-in-class personalized neoantigen cancer vaccine through IND approval and successful execution of two clinical trials

In 2015, he co-founded Neon Therapeutics, Inc. (acquired by BioNTech in 2020 for $67M), as Chief Technology Officer to work on personalizedcancer vaccines. In 2019, he left Neon to re-join the Dana–Farber Cancer Institute and the Broad Institute to continue work on the subject.
