= Edijs Jurēvics =

Latvian musician

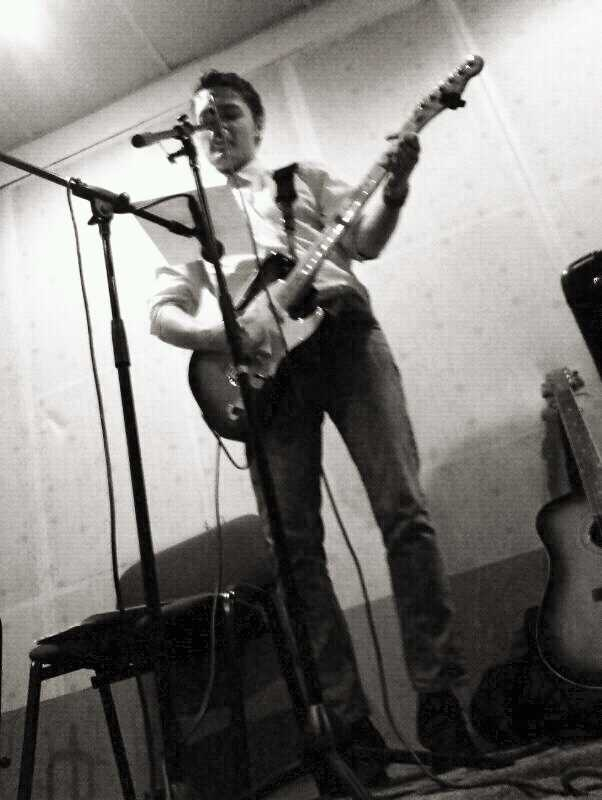
- Edijs Jurēvics at Crow Mother rehearsal studio Riga, Latvia. 2013.01.08.

Background information
- Birth name: Edijs Jurēvics
- Born: 18 December 1989 (age 35)
- Origin: Jelgava, Latvia
- Genres: Rock, Pop rock
- Occupation(s): Singer, songwriter, guitarist, pianist, clarinettist, producer
- Years active: 2008–present
- Labels: Universal Music Group Microphone Records
- Website: www.edijsjurevics.com

Edijs Jurēvics (sometimes anglicized as Eddie Jurevics; born 18 December 1989 in Jelgava) is a Latvian rock singer, guitarist, clarinetist, pianist and songwriter. He is the lead singer of the Latvian rock band Crow Mother.

He began his music career in 2008 as the lead vocalist of the rock band Second File, with which he released two songs Baltā Princese and Tava Patiesība.

His second band, Blacksmith, released two studio singles Saturday's Night and Paralelitāte before disbanding in 2012.

In 2012 Eddie Joined musicians like Jānis Andžāns, Edgars Briedis and Mārtiņš Vilšķērsts and founded an alternative rock band Crow Mother. Currently, they have already released two studio albums.

Eddie's debut solo single, Kur Laime Ir, was released in September 2018

His second band Blacksmith reunited and change the band name to Maldi and released patriotic single Zemes Balss in November 2018.

In 2022, Eddie's merged with the Latvian supergroup Everstate as the new lead vocalist and instrumentalist of this group. Together with Everstate, the first joint single "Ieklausies" is released in the spring of 2025. The track is published in collaboration with the record label Microphone Records.

== Discography ==
=== Radio singles ===
Tear	Single	Album	Top position	
Tear	Single	Album	Latvian Airplay Top 50	Muzikālā banka
2018	Kur Laime Ir	Single	32	10

== TV ==
=== Shows ===
Year	Show	Note	TV channel
2016	"Supernova"	As a member of the show	LTV
