= Paul Ward (judge) =

American judge (1980–1972)

Associate Justice of the Arkansas Supreme Court
- In office 1951–1968

Personal details
- Born: 20 February 1890 Batesville, Independence County, Arkansas
- Died: 10 November 1972 (aged 82)
- Education: Arkansas College; Tulane University; University of Oklahoma (LLB)

Paul Ward (February 20, 1890 – November 8, 1972) was a justice of the Arkansas Supreme Court from 1951 to 1968.

Born in Independence County, Arkansas, he attended Tulane University and the University of Oklahoma Law School. He served in World War I and was mayor of Batesville, Arkansas.

Ward was elected a state senator in 1932 and served until 1938. In 1942, he was elected as Chancery Judge in the Eighth Chancery Circuit and served until he was elected as an Associate Justice of the Arkansas Supreme Court in 1951. Ward served as an associate justice until 1968 when he retired.

Ward died in Little Rock at the age of 82, and was interred at Batesville's Oak Lawn Cemetery.

Political offices
Preceded by Edwin Dunaway	Justice of the Arkansas Supreme Court; 1951–1968	Succeeded by J. Frank Holt
