= Edvard =

Edvard is a form of Edward and may refer to:

- Edvard Askeland (born 1954), Norwegian jazz musician
- Edvard Kaurin Barth (1913–1996), Norwegian zoologist and photographer
- Edvard Befring (born 1936), Norwegian educationalist
- Edvard Beneš (1884–1948), Czech politician
- Edvard Christian Danielsen (1888–1964), Norwegian military officer
- Edvard Diriks (1855–1930), Norwegian painter
- Edvard Drabløs (1883–1976), Norwegian actor and theatre director
- Edvard Engelsaas (1872–1902), Norwegian speed skater
- Edvard Eriksen (1876–1959), Danish-Icelandic sculptor
- Edvard Alexander Fazer (1861–1943), Finnish pianist
- Edvard Grieg (1843–1907), Norwegian composer
- Edvard Heiberg (1911–2000), Norwegian director and engineer
- Edvard Hjelt (1855–1921), Finnish chemist, politician and member of the Senate of Finland
- Edvard Hoem (born 1949), Norwegian writer
- Edvard Hultgren (1904–1984), Swedish boxer
- Edvard Huupponen (1898–1977), Finnish wrestler
- Edvard Isto (1865–1905), Finnish artist
- Edvard Kardelj (1910–1979), Yugoslav politician
- Edvard Johanson (1882–1936), Swedish trade union organizer
- Edvard Larsen (1881–1914), Norwegian triple jumper
- Edvard Lasota (born 1971), Czech football player
- Edvard Liljedahl (1845–1924), Norwegian politician
- Edvard Linna (1886–1974), Finnish gymnast
- Edvard Mirzoyan (1921–2012), Armenian composer
- Edvard Moser (born 1962), Norwegian psychologist and neuroscientist
- Edvard Munch (1863–1944), Norwegian painter
- Edvard Natvig (1907–1994), Norwegian decathlete
- Edvard Persson (1888–1957), Swedish actor and singer
- Edvard Petersen (1841–1911), Danish painter
- Edvard Poulsson (1858–1935), Norwegian physician
- Edvard Ravnikar (1907–1993), Slovenian architect
- Edvard Skagestad (born 1988), Norwegian footballer
- Edvard Westerlund (1901–1982), Finnish Greco-Roman wrestler

== See also ==
- Edvarda
- Edvard Peperko Barracks, barracks in Ljubljana, the capital of Slovenia
