= Édouard =

Édouard is both a French given name and a surname, equivalent to Edward in English. Notable people with the name include:

- Édouard Balladur (born 1929), French politician
- Édouard Bizimana (born 1968), Burundian diplomat and politician
- Édouard Boubat (1923–1999), French photographer
- Édouard Champion (1882–1938), French publisher and bookseller
- Édouard Colonne (1838–1910), French conductor
- Édouard Daladier (1884–1970), French prime minister at the start of World War II
- Edouard Drumont (1844–1917), French antisemitic journalist
- Édouard Dujardin (1861–1949), French writer
- Édouard François (born 1957), French architect
- Édouard Fritch (born 1952), French Polynesian politician, 16th and 17th President of French Polynesia
- Édouard Gagnon (1918–2007), French Canadian cardinal
- Édouard Geffray (born 1978), French politician
- Édouard Herriot (1872–1957), French prime minister, three times, and mayor of Lyon from 1905 to 1957
- Edouard F. Henriques, Make-up artist
- Édouard von Jaunez (1834–1916), German-French politician and industrialist
- Édouard Lalo (1823–1892), French composer
- Édouard Lockroy (1838–1913), French politician
- Édouard Louis (born 1992), French writer
- Édouard Lucas (1842–1891), French mathematician
- Édouard Mathé (1886–1934), French silent film actor
- Édouard Manet (1832–1883), French impressionist painter
- Édouard de Max (1869–1924), Romanian-French actor
- Édouard Mendy (born 1992), Senegalese footballer
- Édouard Ménétries (1802–1861), French entomologist
- Édouard Michelin (1859–1940), French tyre magnate
- Édouard Mortier (1768–1835), French Marshal of Empire
- Édouard Mwangachuchu (born 1953), Congolese businessman and politician
- Édouard Philippe (born 1970), French politician
- Édouard Spach (1801–1879), French botanist
- Édouard Stephan (1837–1923), French astronomer
- Édouard Toudouze (1848–1907), French painter
- Édouard Vuillard (1868–1940), French painter

Surname:

- $not, (born 1997 as Edy Edouard), American rapper
- Odsonne Édouard (born 1998), French footballer
- Romain Édouard (born 1990), French chess player

== See also ==
- Hurricane Edouard (disambiguation)
- Édouard André (disambiguation)
- Edward
- Eduardo
