= Edward Screven =

American billionaire businessman

Edward Screven is an American billionaire businessman, who was executive vice president and chief corporate architect of Oracle Corporation until his retirement in February 2025.

He studied computer science at Carnegie Mellon University.

In 1986 Screven joined Oracle in 1986 and lead the company's technology and architecture decisions as, and its strategic initiatives.

As of September 2025, Forbes estimated his net worth at US$1.1 billion.

Screven lives in Portola Valley, California.
