= Ward Keeler =

American anthropologist

- Education: Cornell University, A.B. University of Chicago, M.A., Ph.D.
- Occupations: Academic, Anthropologist
- Employer: The University of Texas at Austin

Ward Keeler is an American anthropologist who conducted fieldwork in Java in Indonesia during the New Order area.

He worked in predominantly Surakarta cultural areas, and studied wayang as a means of understanding specific manifestation of Javanese ways of thinking.

His book Javanese, a cultural approach was a Javanese language text for English speakers that provided learners with language expressions for learning, rather than elaborate on the complexities of hierarchy within the language and culture.

More recently he has studied Burmese culture

== See also ==
- Clifford Geertz

== Publications ==
- Javanese shadow puppets Singapore :Oxford University Press,1992.
- Javanese shadow plays, Javanese selves Princeton, N.J. :Princeton University Press, c1987.
- Javanese, a cultural approach Athens :Ohio University Center for International Studies,1984.
- Symbolic dimensions of the Javanese house Melbourne, Vic. :Centre of Southeast Asian Studies, Monash University,1983.
- Fighting for democracy on a heap of jewels. Clayton, Vic. :Monash Asia Institute,1997.
- Mangunwijaya, Y. B.,1929- Durga/Umayi :a novel /Y. B. Mangunwijaya; translated by Ward Keeler. Seattle;London :University of Washington Press in association with Singapore University Press, c2004.
- Father puppeteer Chicago, Ill. :University of Chicago,1982.
- Puppet theater of the Javanese; Puppet theater of the Sundanese / Kathy Foley. New York, N.Y. :Festival of Indonesia Foundation, c1991.
