= Duarte =

Duarte may refer to:

- Duarte (name), person's surname (or composed surname) and given name
- Duarte, California, United States
- Duarte Province, Dominican Republic
- Pico Duarte, mountain in the Dominican Republic
- Instituto Cuesta Duarte, a labour think-tank in Uruguay
