= Edvardas Jokūbas Daukša =

Edvardas Jokūbas Daukša (May 1836 – 1890) was a Lithuanian poet, translator, participant of 1863 Uprising.

Born in Biržai, Daukša studied in the local gymnasium, later in Slutsk. He enrolled in the University of Moscow, and later moved to the University of Tartu. Until 1860 he studied philology at the University of Königsberg. From 1861 he lived in Vilnius, and participated in 1863 Uprising. For participating in the uprising he was sentenced to sixteen years of penal labour.

Edvardas Jokūbas Daukša translated numerous works of Johann Wolfgang von Goethe, George Gordon Byron and others. He wrote a grammar of the Lithuanian language Trumpa kalbmokslė liežuvio lietuviško (around 1856).
