= Edgars Burlakovs =

Latvian footballer

Personal information
- Full name: Edgars Burlakovs
- Date of birth: 6 January 1974 (age 52)
- Place of birth: Daugavpils, Latvia
- Height: 1.77 m (5 ft 10 in)
- Position: Midfielder

Senior career*
Years	Team	Apps	(Gls)
1996–1999	Dinaburg Daugavpils	50	(4)
2000	Rubin Kazan	17	(0)
2001	Dinaburg Daugavpils	21	(1)
2002	FC Tyumen	12	(0)
2002	Liepājas Metalurgs	2	(0)
2003–2006	Dinaburg Daugavpils	83	(7)

International career
1997–1998	Latvia	3	(0)
- * Club domestic league appearances and goals

Edgars Burlakovs (born 6 January 1974) is a former football midfielder from Latvia. His last club was Dinaburg FC.

Burlakovs previously played for FC Rubin Kazan in the Russian First Division during the 2000 season.
