= Eduard Zlobin =

Belarusian historian

- Эдуард Львовіч Злобін
- Born: May 2, 1972; Pinsk, Brest Region, BSSR
- Died: August 9, 2024 (aged 52); Pinsk, Belarus
- Education: History and Archives Institute of RSUH (1994)
- Occupations: Historian, archivist, tour guide

Eduard Lvovich Zlobin (2 May 1972 – 9 August 2024) was a Belarusian historian, archivist, and tour guide. He was a prominent researcher of the history of Pinsk and the Western Polesia region.

== Biography ==
Eduard Zlobin was born in Pinsk into the family of Lev Vasilyevich Zlobin (born 1938), a military officer. He graduated from Pinsk Secondary School No. 7. In 1994, he graduated from the History and Archives Institute of the Russian State University for the Humanities (RSUH).

== Activity ==
Eduard Zlobin was the author of numerous publications dedicated to the intertwined history and culture of Belarus, Poland, and Israel. In his research, he focused on identifying and preserving the shared historical heritage of these nations. His work was featured in various periodicals, including the Belarusian historical journal Hіstaryčnaja brama, the Polish quarterly Echa Polesia, and the international Jewish almanac Mishpoha.

Zlobin's research on Jewish heritage and the Holocaust earned recognition from Jewish communities and academic institutions. He served as a co-author of the fundamental study The Holocaust in the Pinsk Region (2007), which explores the history of the destruction of the Jewish population during the German occupation. This publication is officially registered in the Union Electronic Catalog of Libraries of Belarus and is widely utilized as an authoritative source on Holocaust history.

He contributed to the creation of the historical and documentary chronicle "Memory" (Pinsk District volume). Zlobin was well known for developing and leading specialized historical tours. He was considered a key figure in the local history community of Pinsk, dedicating his life to the preservation of the city's cultural heritage.

In the early 1990s, together with historian Rita Margolina, Zlobin documented the Jewish community's right to the building of the Perlov Synagogue in Pinsk. Based on pre-war city plans they discovered in the archives, the authorities returned the building to the religious community, after which it was restored.

He was a participant in the international project "In the Footsteps of the Louise Arner Boyd Expedition: To the 80th Anniversary of the Legendary American's Expedition," implemented with the support of the U.S. Embassy in the Republic of Belarus and the Department for Humanitarian Activities of the Presidential Administration of the Republic of Belarus. As part of the project, he served as a co-author and compiler of the popular science photo album "Louise Boyd's Polesia" (2015), conducting extensive research in the archives of the American explorer; the book underwent two editions (2015, 2018). In addition to his publishing work, Eduard Zlobin contributed to the development of a themed excursion route and the installation of a commemorative sign in honor of the Louise Boyd expedition. He also participated in the creation and filming of the documentary "Louise Boyd's Polesia" (2015).

In 2007, his extensive archive of documents, photographs, and video materials was significantly damaged during a search by law enforcement authorities.

== Selected works ==
- Zlobin, Eduard (2013). "Niechaj Polska zna, jakich synów ma. Rok 1863 na Pińszczyźnie". Echa Polesia (in Polish) (1 (37)): 21–25. ISSN 1897-1083.
- Zlobin, E. (2004). "Fyodor Lavrov (1896-1971) / Pinsk Art School of the 20-30s of the XX century". Gistarychnaya Brama (in Russian) (1 (22)).
- Zenko, V.; Zlobin, E. (2008). Malorita and its surroundings: [photo album] (in Russian). Pinsk: Palyashuk.
- The Polesia of Louise Arner Boyd: photo album / compiled by E. Zlobin, D. Kisel.
