= Edmunds (surname) =

Origin
- Origin: Edmund

Other names
- Variant forms: Edmonds; Edmondson; Edmundson

Edmunds is a surname derived from the given name Edmund.

== People with the surname ==
- Allan L. Edmunds (born 1949), American artist
- Arthur Edmunds (1933–2005), American naval architect
- Bethany Matai Edmunds (born 1978), New Zealand Māori artist
- Bill Edmunds (1898–1964), English footballer
- Charles K. Edmunds (1876–1949), American engineer
- Christopher Edmunds (1899–1990), English composer
- Christiana Edmunds (1828–1907), British poisoner
- Dave Edmunds (born 1944), British rock guitarist
- David Edmunds (born c. 1935), British mathematician
- Dilys Grace Edmunds (1879–1926), Welsh educator
- Don Edmunds (1930–2020), American racecar driver
- Douglas Edmunds (1944–2020), Scottish strongman
- Edward Perrin Edmunds (1925–1967), American senator
- Ernest Edmunds (1846–1920), New Zealand cricketer
- Francis Edmunds (1902–1989), English educator
- Fred Edmunds (1901–1985), Australian politician
- Geoffrey Edmunds (born 1954), English cricketer
- George F. Edmunds (1828–1919), American senator
- George Randall Edmunds (born 1946), American football linebacker
- Graham Edmunds (born 1974), British Paralympic swimmer
- Gregor Edmunds (born 1977), Scottish strongman
- Herbert Weston Edmunds (1881–1954), British philatelist
- Ian Edmunds (born 1961), Australian Olympic rower
- Jacinta Edmunds (born 1994), Australian rower
- James E. Edmunds (born 1970), American politician
- James M. Edmunds (1810–1879), American politician
- James R. Edmunds Jr. (1890–1953), American architect
- James Ewart Edmunds (1882–1962), British politician
- Jane Claire Dirks-Edmunds (1912–2003), American ecologist
- John Edmunds (English academic) (died 1544), English academic
- John R. Edmunds (1812–1873), American politician
- John David Edmunds (1929–2023), British professor
- John C. Edmunds (born 1947), American professor
- Luke Edmunds (born 1981), Australian politician
- Mabel of Bury St. Edmunds (13th century), English embroiderer
- Madeleine Edmunds, Australian Olympic rower
- Margo Edmunds, American health policy researcher
- Martin Edmunds (born 1955), American poet
- Mary Ellen Edmunds (born 1940), American nurse
- Mary Anne Edmunds (1813–1858), Welsh educator
- Mervyn Edmunds, New Zealand cricketer
- Mike Edmunds (born 1949), British astrophysicist
- Nellie Hepburn-Edmunds (1879–1853), British painter
- Nancy Garlock Edmunds (born 1947), American judge
- Newton Edmunds (1819–1908), American governor
- Paul C. Edmunds (1836–1899), American senator
- Paul Edmunds (born 1957), English football manager
- Peter Roy Edmunds, British actor
- Pocahontas Wight Edmunds (1904–1999), American civic leader
- Polina Edmunds (born 1998), American figure skater
- Randy Edmunds (politician), Canadian politician
- Redvern Edmunds (born 1943), Welsh footballer
- Raymond Edmunds (born 1944), Australian murderer rapist
- Richard Edmunds (athlete) (born 1937), American sprinter
- Richard Harold Edmunds (1970–1989), English cricketer
- Richard Edmunds (rower) (born 1947), American Olympic rower
- Richard Champion Edmunds, Jr. (born 1963), American politician
- Robert Henry Edmunds (1834–1917), Australian explorer
- Robert H. Edmunds Jr. (born 1949), American judge
- Rhian Edmunds (born 2003), Welsh track cyclist
- Rosina Edmunds (1900–1956), Australian architect
- Terrell Edmunds (born 1998), American football player
- Tremaine Edmunds (born 1998), American football player
- Trey Edmunds (born 1994), American football player
- Tom Edmunds (1925–2003), Australian politician
- Walter Edmunds (1856–1932), Australian judge
- William Edmunds (architect) (1801–1847), English architect
- William P. Edmunds (1885–1977), American football coach
- William Edmunds (actor) (1886–1981), Italian-American actor
- William Glyndwr Edmunds (born 1947), Welsh educationalist
- Sir William John Edmunds, British epidemiologist

== Fictional character ==
- Chase Edmunds, on the television series 24

== See also ==
- Edmonds (surname)
- Edmund (given name)
- Edmund (disambiguation) § People with the surname Edmund
