= Edmonds (surname) =

Origin
- Origin: Edmond

Other names
- Variant forms: Edmunds, Esmond, Edmondson, Edmundson

Edmonds is a surname derived from the given name Edmond.

== List of people surnamed Edmonds ==
- Alfred Edmonds (1821–1893), Canadian artist, draughtsman and cartographer
- Barry Edmonds (1931–1982), American photojournalist
- Beth Edmonds, Maine State Senator
- Cecil J. Edmonds, British political officer
- Charles Edmonds, British World War I naval aviator and World War II air marshal
- Chase Edmonds (born 1996), American football player
- Duncan Edmonds, Canadian businessman and politician
- Edith Edmonds, (1874–1951), British artist
- Ernest Harry Edmonds (1883–1962) "Harry Edmonds", a farmer politician in South Australia
- Fella Edmonds (born 1940), British child actor
- Francis William Edmonds (1806–1863), American painter
- George Edmonds (lawyer) (1788–1868), English lawyer
- George W. Edmonds (1864–1939), US Representative from Pennsylvania
- Jack Edmonds, Canadian mathematician and computer scientist
- James Edward Edmonds, British Official Historian of the Great War 1914–1918
- Jim Edmonds (born 1970), American baseball player and broadcaster
- John Edmonds (disambiguation)
- John Samuel Edmonds (born 1799), New Zealand missionary, trader, stonemason and founding father.
- Kenneth Edmonds, better known as Babyface, (born 1959) American R&B musician and record producer
- Lindsay Edmonds, American basketball coach
- Louis Edmonds, Louis Stirling Edmonds (1923–2001) American actor from Baton Rouge, Louisiana
- Lu Edmonds Robert David Edmonds (born 1957), English rock and folk musician
- Mike Edmonds (born 1944) English actor with dwarfism, "Little Ron" in the children's series Maid Marian and Her Merry Men
- Mike Edmonds (educator), American academic administrator
- Noel Edmonds (born 1948) English broadcaster and executive
- Phil Edmonds (born 1951), English former cricketer and corporate executive
- Ray Edmonds (born 1936), English professional billiards and snooker player
- Richard Edmonds (1943–2020), British Nationalist politician
- Richard Edmonds (scientist) (1801–1886), Cornish geologist & archaeologist
- Ronald Edmonds (1935–1983), American educational researcher
- Ronald A. Edmonds (1946–2024), American photojournalist
- Sibel Edmonds former FBI translator and founder of the National Security Whistleblowers Coalition
- Sandy Edmonds (1948–2022), British-born pop singer in New Zealand and Australia
- Sarah Emma Edmonds, North American civil war – soldier, nurse, and spy
- Thomas Edmonds (disambiguation), several people
- Thomas Edmonds (tenor), Australian opera singer
- Thomas Rowe Edmonds, (1803–1889) English actuary and political economist
- Tracey Edmonds (born 1967) American businesswoman and television personality
- Tyler Edmonds (born 1989) American falsely arrested and charged with first-degree murder
- Walter D. Edmonds (1903–1998) American writer of historical novels
- Ward Edmonds (1908–1930), American athlete

== Fictional people surnamed Edmonds ==
- Mertle Edmonds (Mildred Pearl "Mertle" Edmonds), Lilo Pelekai's main rival in Disney's Lilo & Stitch franchise.

== See also ==
- Edmunds (surname)
- Edmond (given name)
