= Edmonds =

Edmonds may refer to:

- Edmonds (surname), a surname (including a list of people with the surname)
- Edmonds, Washington, a city in Washington, US
  - Edmonds station (Washington), a passenger train station in Washington, US
- Edmonds station (SkyTrain), a SkyTrain station in Burnaby, British Columbia, Canada
- Edmonds (brand), New Zealand baking brand
- Edmonds College
- Edmonds Cookery Book
- Edmonds Woodway High School
- Edmonds, Burnaby
- Edmonds School District
- Edmonson County, Kentucky

== See also ==
- Burnaby-Edmonds, an electoral district in British Columbia, Canada
- Edmond (disambiguation)
- Edmunds (disambiguation)
