= Edmonds' Clock Tower =

Edmonds Clock Tower
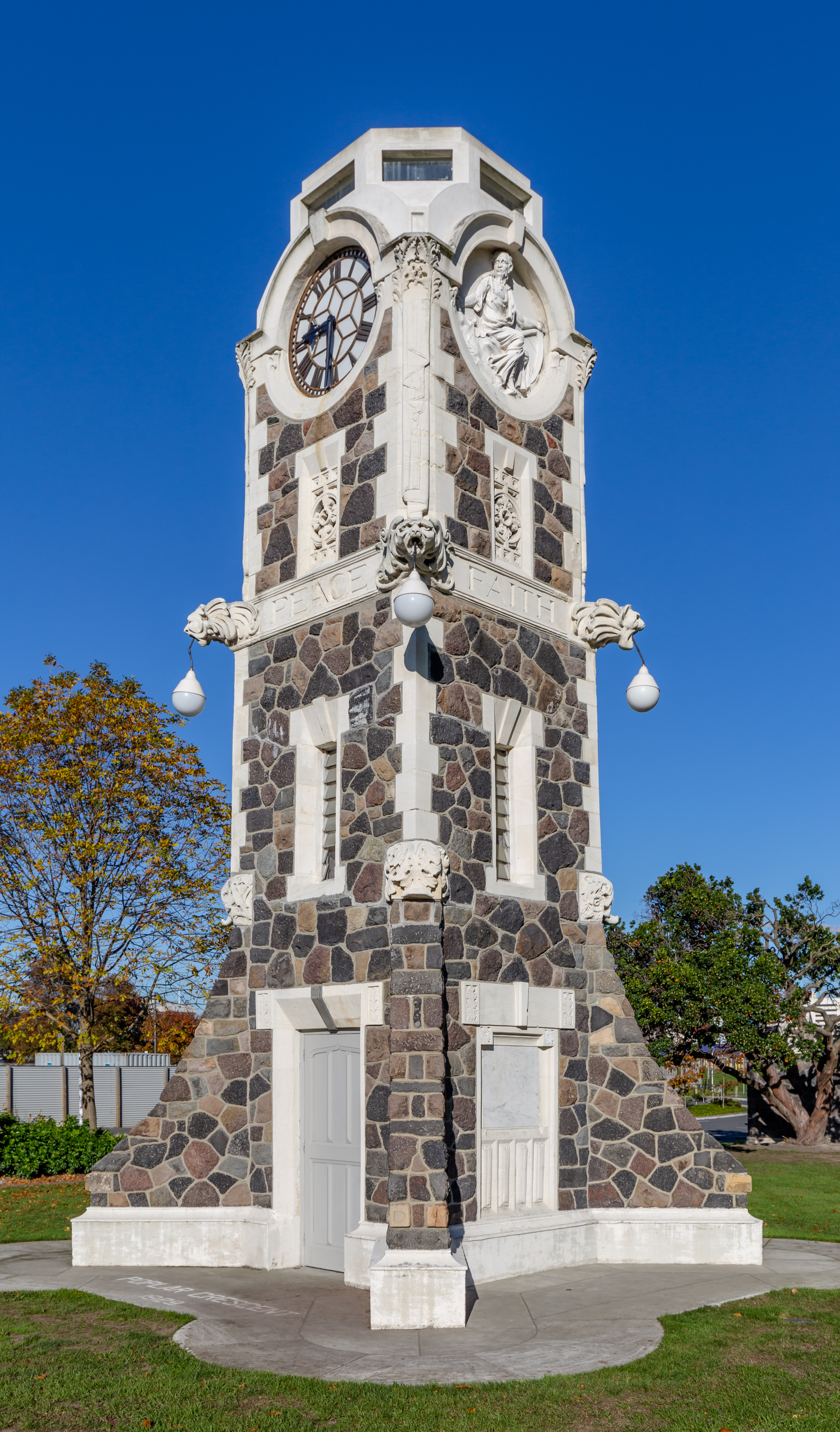
- Edmonds Clock Tower in 2019

General information
- Location: Christchurch, New Zealand
- Coordinates: 43°31′39″S 172°38′33″E
- Opened: 1929

Design and construction
- Architect(s): Francis Willis

Heritage New Zealand – Category 2
- Designated: 26 November 1981
- Reference no.: 3106

Edmonds Clock Tower is a clock tower in Christchurch, New Zealand. Created by baking powder manufacturer Thomas Edmonds in 1929 to celebrate his 50th year of living in the city, it has been listed with Heritage New Zealand as a Category 2 historic place since 1981.

== History ==
The clock tower was a donation by Thomas Edmonds, founder of the Edmonds brand, to celebrate 50 years of his living in Christchurch, as part of his riverside improvement scheme at a place called Poplar Crescent, which also saw the building of the Edmonds Band Rotunda. The clock tower was designed by Francis Willis, who also designed New Regent Street. The sculptor was William Trethewey, who also worked on several other projects in Christchurch, including the Bridge of Remembrance and the Statue of James Cook.

Edmonds unveiled the foundation stone on 26 September 1929, the same day that he unveiled the foundation stones of the Edmonds Band Rotunda and the Radiant Hall. Inscribed on it is the text:

This clock tower, telephone cabinet

and all standard lights in

Poplar Crescent were presented

by T. J. Edmonds to celebrate

50 years residence in Christchurch

26 September 1929

The clock tower has been listed by Heritage New Zealand as a Category 2 historic place since November 1981. The devastating February 2011 and June 2011 Christchurch earthquakes caused damage to the clock tower. In May 2012, after the June earthquakes, the top part of the clock tower was temporarily removed, splitting the clock tower in two, to improve public safety. The top was placed back in April 2013, and repairwork and strengthening was done from 2013 through 2015.

== Design ==
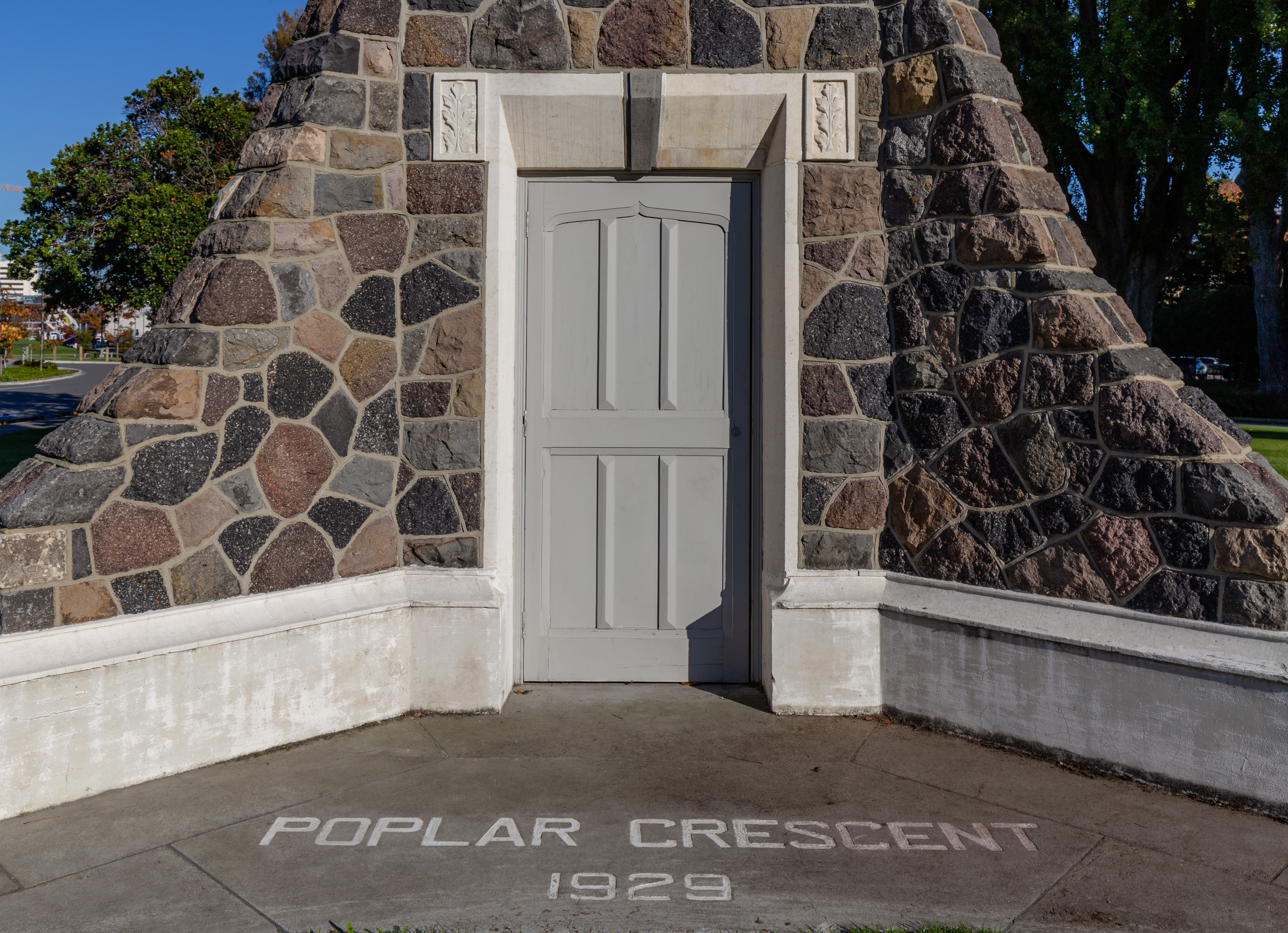
Clock tower door, 2019

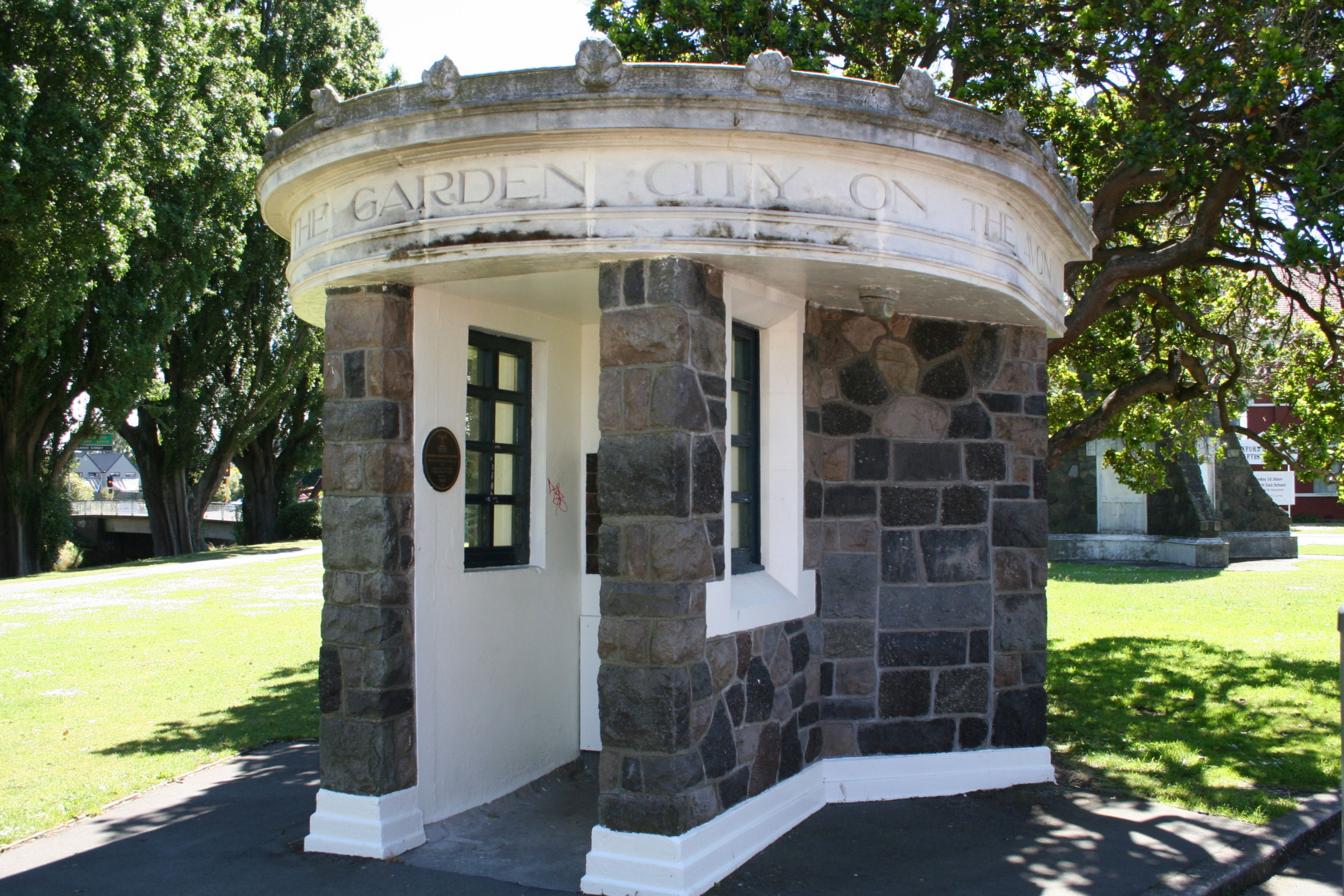
Telephone cabinet

The clock tower was made from volcanic rock, limestone from Mount Somers / Te Kiekie and reinforced concrete. There are windows on all sides of the clock tower, and there is a door on the west side, with the text "Poplar Crescent 1929" on the ground beside it. There are buttresses as well as gargoyles on each corner with globe lights hanging from their mouths, and the sides of the tower has the text "Faith", "Hope", "Peace" and "Charity". On the north and south sides of the tower there are matching medallions which portray Father Time, the personification of time passing. He is presented with an hour glass and a scythe, and looks like Edmonds. On the west side there is an owl to symbolise wisdom, a squirrel is on the south-east buttress, and on the other two buttresses there are two unknown birds.

To the west of the clock tower is a circular-shaped telephone cabinet and letter box, which was made with the same materials as the clock tower. It has a drinking fountain, a window, and a flat roof with acanthus leaves on it. The door to the inside has been boarded up because of vandalism.

== See also ==
- Victoria Clock Tower
