= Mund (law) =

Germanic legal relationship

The mund is a principle in Germanic law that can be crudely translated as 'protection' and which grew as the prerogative of a Germanic tribal king or leader. It has been Latinized in mundium.

The word comes from Proto-Germanic *mundō (cf. Old English/Old Norse mund, 'hand; protection').

== Family law ==
The mund is basically the leadership of an ancestor of a family, a family which is understood as all the people related by blood to this ancestor, exerted over all and each of the family members. The ancestor's responsibility is more aimed at the family as a whole than towards each member individually. It is the responsibility to defend the family's well-being and existence from all dangers and offenses (be they against the body or the honour).

The mund manifests itself as a disciplinary power upon the members of the family; the tenant of the mund had to watch over the women's chastity and faithfulness to prevent the family honour from being harmed; whether a bride was not a virgin at the time of her departure from the family in the case of chastity; and whether sons were born that were not of the common blood in the case of faithfulness. It also had to control the male family members who might cast shame on the family honour, who might not serve the family, or who might endanger the whole family by their imprudence (for example by drawing the family into a feud). Thus the keeper of the mund could ban a member from the family. In this aspect, it is a coercive power, an authority, but not understood as the Roman auctoritas.

When the Germanic traditions mingled with the Roman law in the post-Migration kingdoms, the mund, which came to be known as mundium, was part of the many codes of law those kingdoms issued. It became the responsibility of the closer male relative over non-responsible members of the society, i.e. mostly children and women. As such, it gets mixed up with the guardianship; but it also protects mothers (Lex Burgundionum art. LIX & LXXXV). It became useless as soon as such a protected member was responsible for himself, as when children grew. Prominent women also could shudder the mundium off.

== Extension ==
From this first mund, the principle was extended to the entire tribe, then to several tribes. For example, Early Franks were divided into Salians, scattered in tribes dominated by tribal munds, and Ripuarians, that were all comprised under the mund of a king in Cologne, although he wasn't the king of all the Ripuarians, but only their "protector". This can be seen as an archaic building of the momentum that was eventually to concentrate the coercive power (potestas) and legal violence in the hands of a few, namely the nobles, and later only the monarchs.

The mund came to parallel the principle of auctoritas, without being the same as the kingship.

The mundium regis, for example, was the king's responsibility to protect his subjects and the churches.

The mund passed through to the code of chivalry as a Christian virtue. It passed also, although modified, in modern political conceptions under the terms translatable as 'protector'. To an extent, the paternalism associated with medieval and modern kingships owes more to the mund than to the elected Germanic kingship.

== Use in names ==
The particle mund is to be found in many Germanic names, and hence passed into some modern names as well. Examples include:

- Edmund > Edmond
- Reginnmund > Raymond
- Sigismund > Sigmund

== See also ==
- Legal guardian – Person with the legal authority to handle the care affairs of another person
