= Richard Edmunds =

Richard Edmunds may refer to:

- Richard Edmunds (athlete) (born 1937), American sprinter
- Richard Edmunds (cricketer) (1970–1989), English cricketer
- Richard Edmunds (rower) (born 1947), American Olympic rower
- Richard Champion "Champ" Edmunds, Jr. (born 1963), American politician

== See also ==
- Richard Edmonds (1943–2020), English neo-Nazi
- Richard Edmonds (scientist) (1801–1886), British scientific writer
- Rick Edmonds (Richard Phillip Edmonds Jr.), member of the Louisiana House of Representatives
