= Edmonston =

Edmonston is a surname. Notable people with the surname include:

- James Ronald Edmonston Charles (1875–1955), British officer in the Royal Engineers
- Gabriel Edmonston (1839–1918), American labor unionist and carpenter
- Kathy Edmonston, American politician, member of the Louisiana House of Representatives
- Phil Edmonston (1944–2022), Canadian consumer advocate, writer and former politician
- Sam Edmonston (1883–1979), American pitcher in Major League Baseball
- Susan Edmonston Ferrier (1782–1854), Scottish novelist

== See also ==
- Edmonston House, New Windsor, Orange County, New York, United States
- Edmonston, Maryland, town in Prince George's County, Maryland, United States
- Edmonston Pumping Plant, pumping station near the south end of the California Aqueduct, United States
- Edmondston
- Edmondstown
- Edmonson (disambiguation)
- Edmonstone
- Edmonton
