= Edmondson (surname) =

Edmondson is a patronymic surname meaning "son of Edmond". There are varied spellings, including Edmonson. It is uncommon as a given name. Notable people with the surname Edmondson include:

- Ade Edmondson (born 1957), British comedian, actor, writer, musician, television presenter and director
- Beattie Edmondson (born 1987), English actress, daughter of Ade
- David Edmondson
- Donald Frank Edmondson (born 1947)
- Donna Edmondson
- Douglas Edmondson
- Drew Edmondson
- Ed Edmondson (chess official)
- Ed Edmondson (U.S. politician)
- Ella Edmondson (born 1986), English musician
- Frank K. Edmondson (1912–2008), American astronomer
- G. C. Edmondson, working name of science fiction author Garry Edmonson (1922–1995)
- J. Howard Edmondson
- James E. Edmondson
- Jerold A. Edmondson, professor emeritus of Linguistics at the University of Texas at Arlington
- John Hurst Edmondson
- Joseph Edmondson (died 1786), English herald and genealogist
- Lewis Edmondson (born 1995), English professional boxer
- Lindsey Edmondson
- Mark Edmondson
- Mark Edmondson (rugby league footballer)
- Matt Edmondson (born 1985), British television and radio presenter
- Paul Edmondson
- Ryan Edmondson, English footballer
- Thomas Edmondson (born c. 1645), Burgess - Virginia House of Burgesses 1693 et al.
- Thomas William Edmondson (1869–1938), American mathematician
- Thomas Edmondson, inventor of the Edmondson railway ticket
- Van Edmondson (1899–1998), American football player
- Walles T. Edmondson ("Tommy") limnologist at University of Washington
- William Edmondson (disambiguation), multiple people
- Yvette Hardman Edmondson, scientist and former editor of Limnology and Oceanography

== See also ==
- Edmondston, a surname
- Edmundson (disambiguation)
- Edmonds (disambiguation)
