= Edmundson =

Edmundson may refer to:

== People ==
=== Surname ===
- Garry Edmundson (1932–2016), Canadian, retired professional ice hockey player
- Hec Edmundson (1886–1964), American basketball coach
- Helen Edmundson (born 1964), British playwright
- Henry A. Edmundson (1814–1890), American politician
- Jóan Símun Edmundsson (born 1991), Faroese footballer
- Joel Edmundson (born 1993), Canadian ice hockey player
- John Edmundson, American, USN, chief medical doctor at the Guantanamo Bay detainment camps in Cuba
- Olive Edmundson (1881–1972), British horticulturalist
- Sarah Emma Edmundson (1841–1898), Canadian-born woman who served as a soldier (disguised as a man) in the Union Army during the American Civil War

=== Given name ===
- Sherry Edmundson Fry (1879–1966), American sculptor
- Edmundson Parkes (1904–1997), President and CEO of United Gas Corporation

== Other ==
- Edmundson, Missouri, a US city
- Hec Edmundson Pavilion, an indoor arena on the campus of University of Washington

== See also ==
- Edmondson (disambiguation)
- Edmondston, a surname
- Edmunds (disambiguation)
