= Edmonson =

Edmonson may refer to:

Places

- Edmonson County, Kentucky
- Edmonson, Missouri, an unincorporated community
- Edmonson, Texas, a town
- Edmonson Point, Victoria Land, Antarctica

Surname

- Edmonson sisters, Mary (1832–1853) and Emily (1835–1895), African-American abolitionists after being freed from slavery
- Greg Edmonson, television and movie music composer
- Greg Edmonson (artist) (born 1960), Canadian painter
- Kat Edmonson (born 1983), American singer and songwriter
- Keith Edmonson (born 1960), American former basketball player
- Mike Edmonson (born 1958), superintendent of the Louisiana State Police since 2008
- Munro S. Edmonson (1924–2002), American linguist and anthropologist
- Travis Edmonson (1932-2009), American folk singer

== See also ==
- Edmondson (disambiguation)
