= Thomas Edmonds =

Thomas or Tom Edmonds may refer to:

- Thomas Edmonds (manufacturer) (1858–1932), philanthropist from Christchurch known for his 'Sure to Rise' baking powder and the Edmonds Cookery Book
- Thomas Edmonds (tenor), (1934– ) Australian opera singer
- Thomas Rowe Edmonds (1803–1889), English actuary and political economist
- Thomas Edmondes (1563–1639), also spelt Edmonds, English diplomat, MP and Treasurer of the Household
- Tom Edmonds (footballer) (1878–?), Scottish footballer
