= Pierre-Antoine Berryer =

French politician and lawyer (1790–1868)

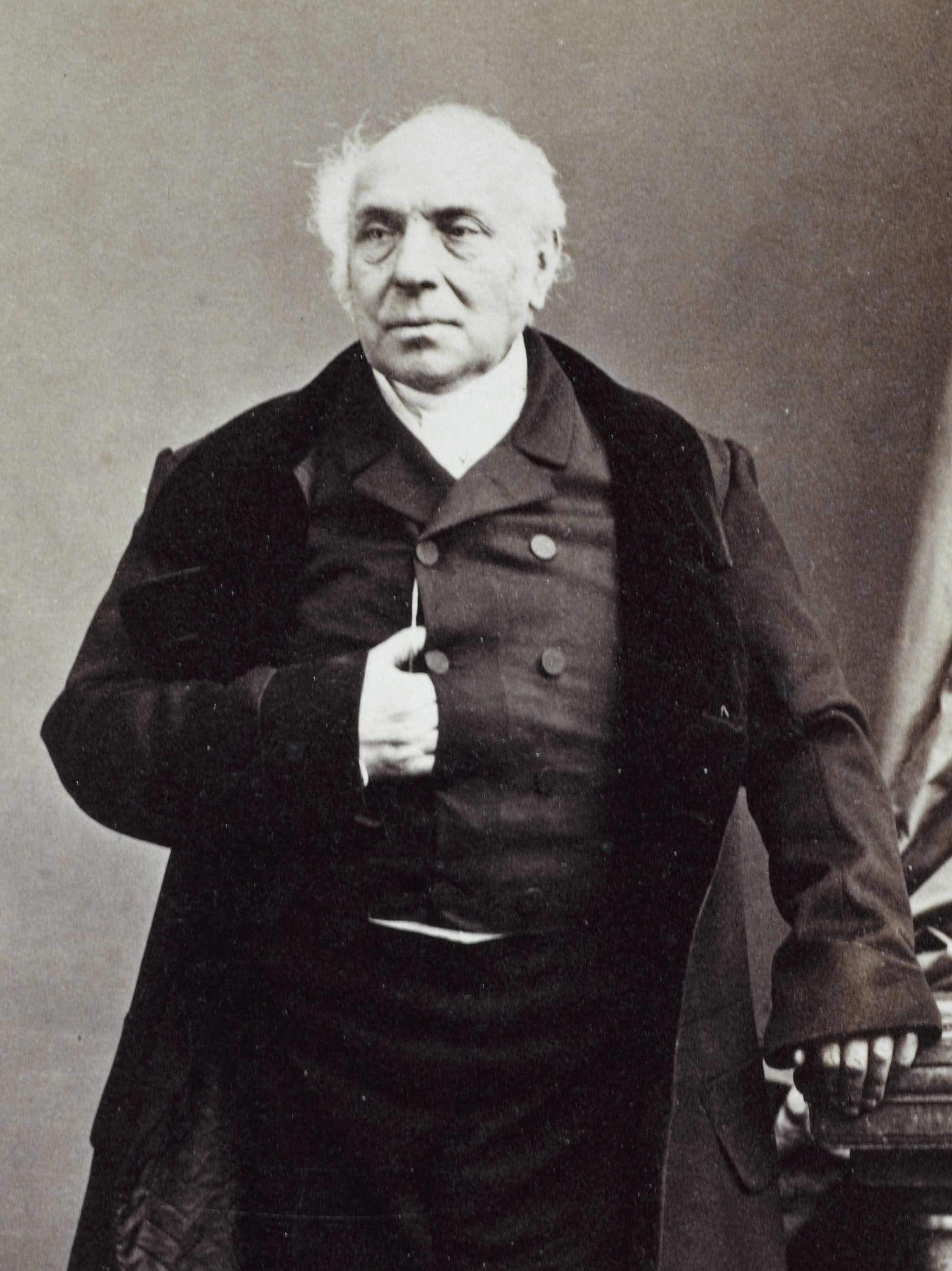
- Portrait of Berryer

Member of the Legislative Body for Bouches-du-Rhône
- In office 15 June 1863 – 29 November 1868
- Preceded by: Edmond Canaple
- Succeeded by: Alphonse Esquiros
- Constituency: Marseille

Member of the Académie française
- In office 12 February 1852 – 29 November 1868
- Preceded by: Alexis Guignard de Saint-Priest
- Succeeded by: François-Joseph de Champagny

Member of the Chamber of Deputies/National Assembly for Bouches-du-Rhône
- In office 22 June 1834 – 2 December 1851
- Preceded by: Félix de Beaujour
- Succeeded by: Constituency abolished
- Constituency: Marseille

Member of the Chamber of Deputies for Haute-Loire
- In office 25 November 1817 – 21 June 1834
- Preceded by: Constituency created
- Succeeded by: Jean-François Calemard de Lafayette
- Constituency: Pierre Augustin Cuocq

Personal details
- Born: 4 January 1790 Paris, France
- Died: 29 November 1868 (aged 78) Augerville-la-Rivière, Loiret, French Empire
- Party: Ultra-royalist (1817–1830); Legitimist (1830–48; 1863–69); Party of Order (1848–1851)
- Spouse: Caroline Gauthier (m. 1811; died 1842)
- Children: Pierre Clémenent; Arthur
- Education: College of Juilly
- Alma mater: University of Paris
- Profession: Lawyer

Pierre-Antoine Berryer (4 January 1790 – 29 November 1868) was a French advocate and parliamentary orator. He was the twelfth member elected to occupy Seat Four of the Académie française in 1852.

== Biography ==
=== Early years ===
Berryer was born in Paris, the son of an eminent advocate and counselor to the parlement, a direct descendant from the first recorded members of the Berryer family originating from Jean de Candie, lord of Berryer in Bourges, in the person of Denis de Candie de la Berryer, royal commissioner of waters and forests of Domfront and Le Mans (died in 1630).

He was educated at the Collège de Juilly. Upon leaving he adopted the law profession. He was admitted advocate in 1811. He married in that same year. In the great conflict of the period between Napoleon I and the Bourbons, Berryer, like his father, was an ardent Legitimist. In the spring of 1815, at the opening of the campaign of the Hundred Days, he followed Louis XVIII to Ghent as a volunteer.

=== Career ===
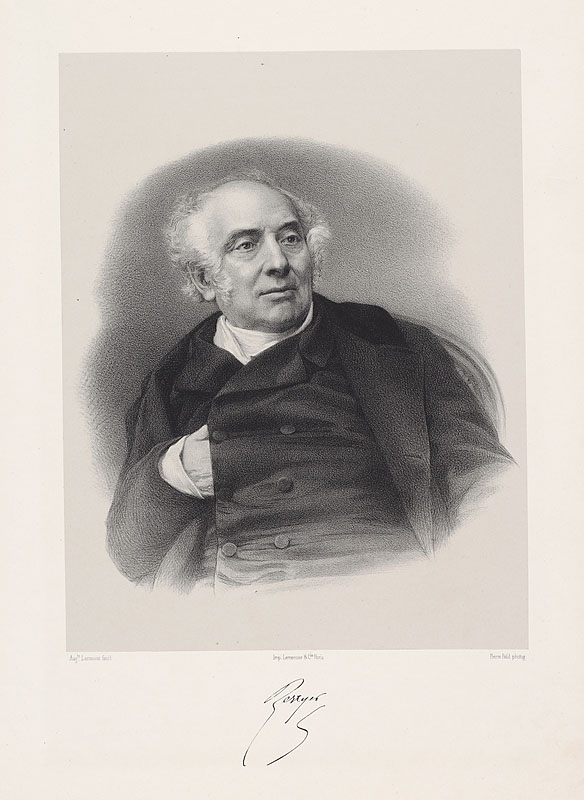
An older Berryer

After the second restoration he distinguished himself as a courageous advocate of moderation in the treatment of the military adherents of the emperor. He assisted his father and Dupin in the unsuccessful defence of Marshal Ney before the chamber of peers. He undertook the defence of General Cambronne and General Debelle, procuring the acquittal of the former and the pardon of the latter. By this time he had a very large business as advocate, and was engaged on behalf of journalists in many press prosecutions.

Berryer stood forward with a noble resolution to maintain the freedom of the press, and he severely censured the rigorous measures of the police department. In 1830, not long before the fall of Charles X, Berryer was elected to the chamber of deputies. He appeared there as the champion of the king and encouraged him in his reactionary policy. After the revolution of July, when the Legitimists withdrew in a body, Berryer alone retained his seat as deputy. He unsuccessfully resisted the abolition of the hereditary peerage. He advocated trial by jury in press prosecutions, the extension of municipal franchises, and other liberal measures.

In May 1832, he hastened from Paris to see the Duchess of Berry on her landing in the south of France. Her purpose was to organize an insurrection in favour of her son, the Duke of Bordeaux, who has since become known as the Comte de Chambord. Berryer attempted to turn her from her purpose. Failing to do, he set out for Switzerland. But he was arrested, imprisoned, and brought to trial as one of the insurgents. He was immediately acquitted. In the following year he pleaded for the liberation of the duchess, made a memorable speech in defence of François-René de Chateaubriand, who was prosecuted for his violent attacks on the government of Louis-Philippe I, and undertook the defence of several Legitimist journalists.

Among the more noteworthy events of his subsequent career were his defence of Louis Napoleon after the ridiculous affair of Boulogne in 1840, and a visit to England in December 1843 for the purpose of formally acknowledging the pretender Henri, comte de Chambord who was then living in London as "Henry V" and lawful king of France. Berryer was an active member of the National Assembly convoked after the revolution of February 1848. He again visited the pretender, then at Wiesbaden, and fought in the old cause. His long parliamentary career came to an end with a courageous protest against the coup d'état of 2 December 1851.

After a lapse of twelve years, however, he appeared once more in his forsaken field as a deputy to the Corps Législatif. Berryer was elected as a member of the Académie française in 1854. On his visit to Henry Brougham, 1st Baron Brougham and Vaux in 1865, a banquet was given in his honour by the benchers of the Temple and of Lincoln's Inn. In November 1868, he left Paris of his own volition to retire to his country seat at Augerville, and there he died on 29 November.
