= Edmund Murray =

Edmund Murray may refer to:

- Edmund Murray (priest) (1877–1969), Archdeacon of Cheltenham
- Edmund P. Murray (1930–2007), American writer

== See also ==
- Edmund Murray Dodd (1797–1876), lawyer, judge and political figure in Nova Scotia
