= Edmondson =

Edmondson may refer to:

- Edmondson (surname)
- Edmondson, Arkansas, United States, a town
- Edmondson, Baltimore, Maryland, United States, a neighborhood
  - Edmondson station, a disused train station there
- Edmondson Park, New South Wales, Australia, a suburb of Sydney
- Edmondson railway ticket
- 1761 Edmondson, asteroid

== See also ==
- Edmonds (disambiguation)
- Edmundson (disambiguation)
