= William Edmondson (disambiguation) =

William Edmondson (1874–1951) was an African-American sculptor.

William Edmondson may also refer to:

- William Edmondson (footballer) (played 1902–03), English footballer
- William Edmundson (1627–1712), or Edmondson, English founder of Quakerism in Ireland
- William B. Edmondson (1927–2013), American army officer
- William Edmondson (sound engineer) (1906–1998), American sound engineer
