= Edmonds Band Rotunda =

Band rotunda in Christchurch, New Zealand

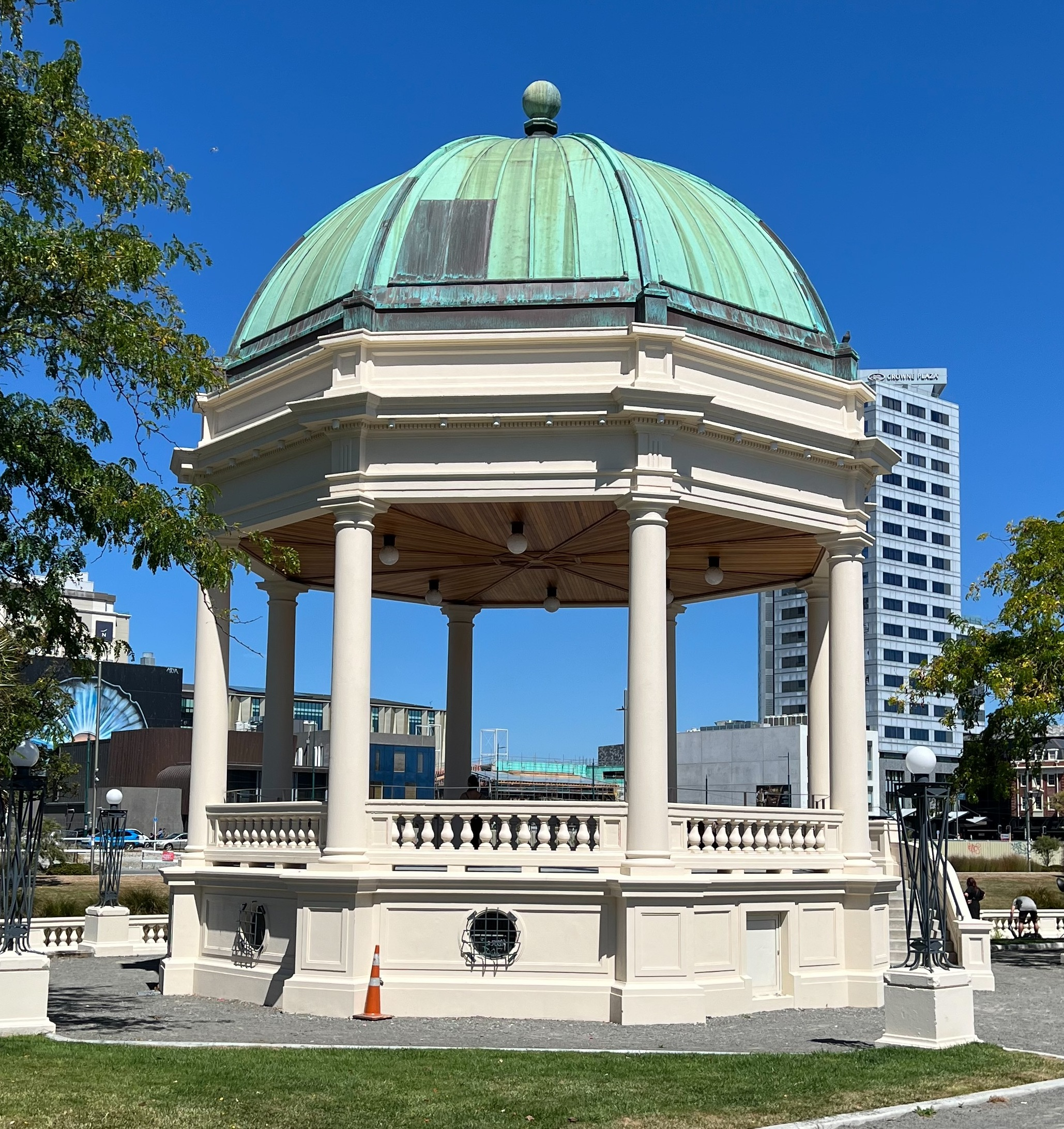
- Edmonds Band Rotunda in 2024

General information
- Architectural style: High Renaissance
- Location: Christchurch, New Zealand
- Coordinates: 43°31′40″S 172°38′20″E
- Opened: 11 November 1929

Design and construction
- Architect(s): Victor Hean

Heritage New Zealand – Category 2
- Designated: 11 November 1981
- Reference no.: 1865

The Edmonds Band Rotunda is a rotunda in Christchurch, New Zealand. Created by baking powder manufacturer Thomas Edmonds in 1929 to celebrate his 50th year of living in the city, it was used initially as a place for brass bands to play music. It was converted to a restaurant in the 1980s. The 2010 and 2011 Christchurch earthquakes caused significant damage to the rotunda, and it had to be deconstructed. After being rebuilt, the rotunda re-opened in 2021 and is now used for performances.

The rotunda has been listed with Heritage New Zealand as a Category 2 historic place since 1981.

== History ==
The Edmonds Band Rotunda was created by Thomas Edmonds, creator of the Edmonds baking powder, to celebrate his 50th year of living in Christchurch, as part of his River Bank Improvement Scheme. Listening to brass bands, which were subsidised by the city council, was a common form of entertainment at the time. After Edmonds made the offer to build the rotunda, the council accepted in April 1929. By May, the contract to build it had been given to builder Neil McGillivray.

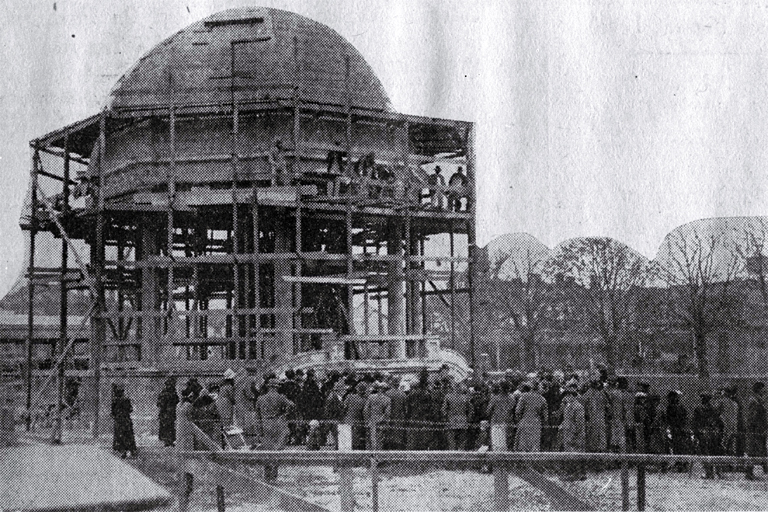
The foundation stone being unveiled in 1929

After construction of the rotunda had already started, Edmonds unveiled the foundation stone on 26 September 1929, after he had unveiled the foundation stones of two of his other buildings on the same day. The rotunda was formally opened on 11 November 1929, when Edmonds's wife cut the ribbon, and nine bands played.

Due to a decline in the public interest of listening to band concerts, the rotunda gradually became unused. So in 1985 or 1986 (sources vary) it was changed to a restaurant, with the name of the Thomas Edmonds Restaurant, and later the Retour Restaurant. The rotunda's character remained the same, with windows being added between the pillars as well as striped awnings. The basement was converted into a kitchen and had bathrooms added. It opened on 1 March 1987, with two of Edmonds's daughters attending.

=== Earthquakes ===
After its supporting structures were damaged in the 2010 and 2011 Canterbury earthquakes, the rotunda was added to the city's demolition list in March 2012 because it was considered dangerous. Deconstruction was finished by September, with the dome and other parts being saved on the ground nearby. The dome sat there for several years; thieves gradually picked off its copper roofing.

The city council approved the rebuild of the rotunda in September 2016, and the project was allocated $1.5 million. A start date of early 2017 was chosen, but when that time arrived, the rebuild was delayed to 2018. Again, restoration shifted from February 2019 to September 2019. The city council cited "budgetary reasons" for these delays. In July 2019, the city council allocated $1.6 million for the rebuild. In February 2021, the Christchurch Earthquake Appeal Trust donated $1 million of the $1.5 million needed.

The rebuild started in March 2020. The dome was placed onto the rotunda in November 2020; its weight required a crane to be transported from the North Island. Restoration of the rotunda itself was finished in July 2021, and landscaping was done in August. The restoration saw the addition of roll-up panel screens to protect the interior from the weather. Re-opening occurred in October 2021.

The council did not want the rebuilt rotunda to retain the basement which was used for the restaurant, and Gerald Edmonds, the great-great-grandson of Thomas Edmonds, suggested that Thomas Edmonds would not have wanted the rotunda to be used as a restaurant, as it was made for music. The rotunda is not used as a restaurant anymore; instead, it is a public space that is used as a performance venue.

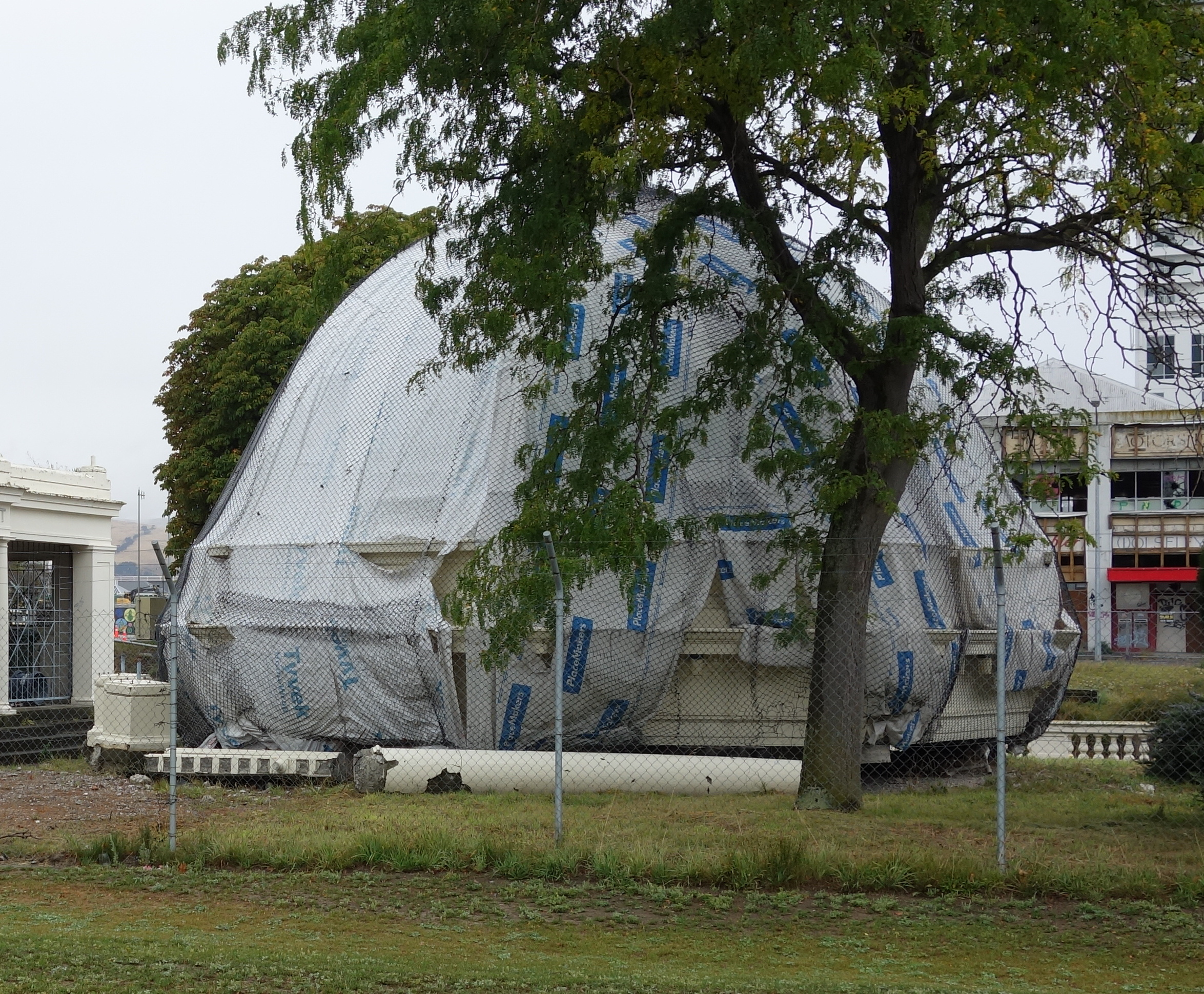
The dome on the ground, in a cover

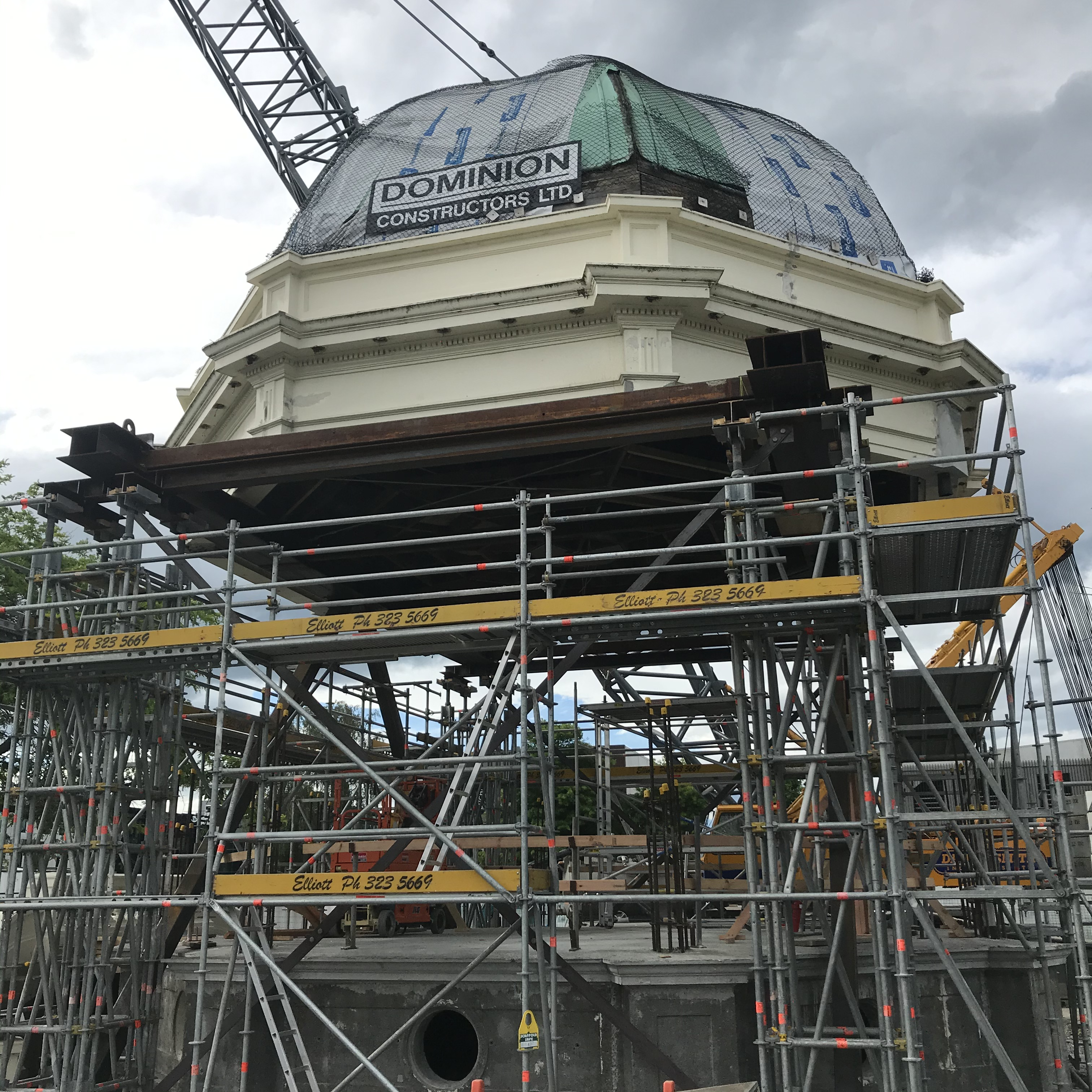
The rotunda being restored

== Description ==
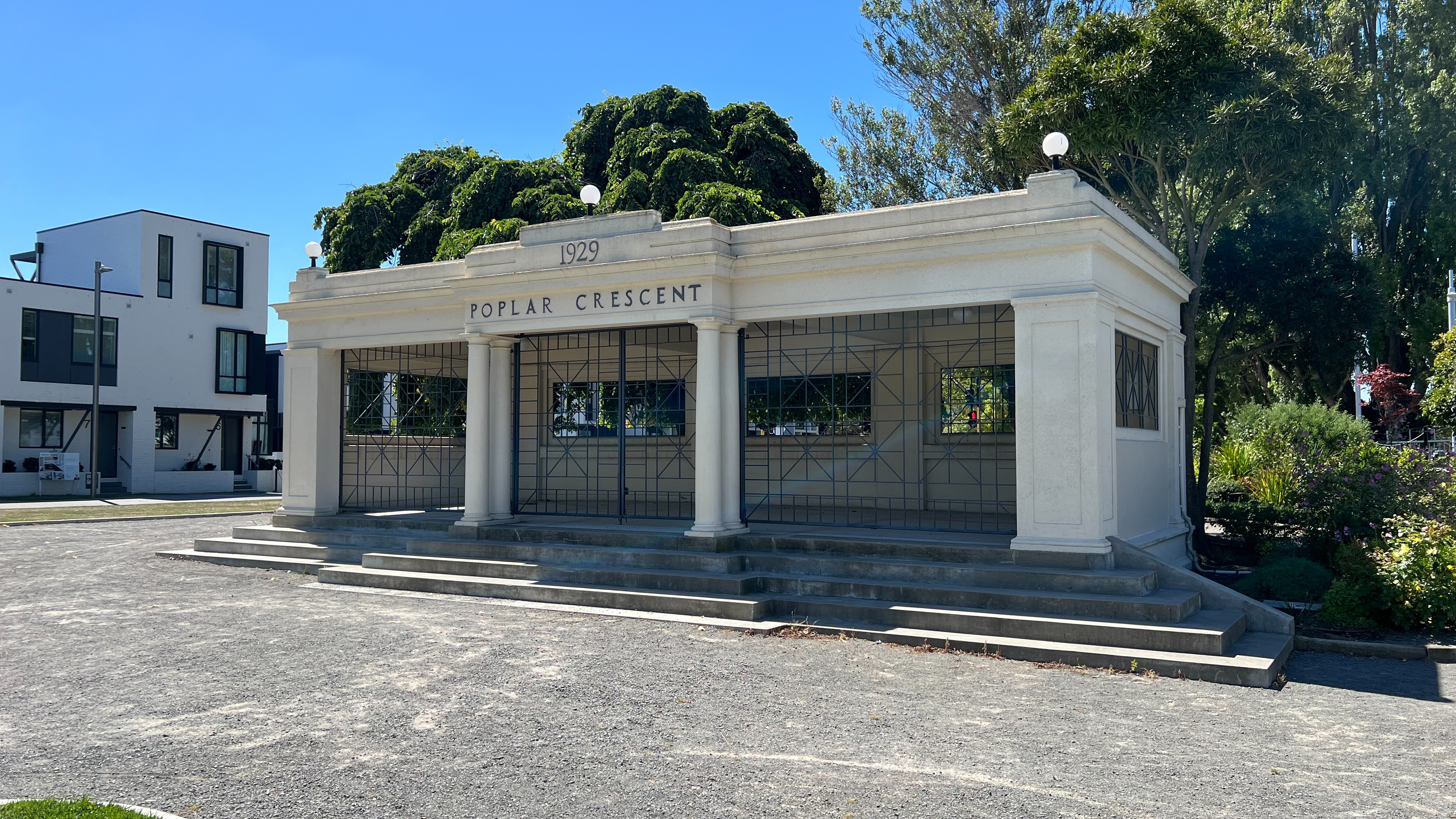
The building to the east of the rotunda

The rotunda is located in Cambridge Terrace and overlooks the Avon River / Ōtākaro, near the Manchester Street Bridge. It was designed by Victor Hean, in a High Renaissance style, and has been listed with the New Zealand Historic Places Trust as a Category 2 historic place since 1981.

The rotunda has an octagonal shape, with a height of 12 metres (39 ft) and a diameter of 10.2 metres (33 ft). Each corner of the octagon has a 4.8-metre-tall (16 ft) pillar, which all work together to hold up the dome. The dome is made of timber, is sheathed in copper, and weighs over 80 tonnes. There is a semi-circular seat to the east of the rotunda, and the west is a shelter made of reinforced concrete, used initially to hold band equipment.
