= Edmonds Cookery Book =

Iconic cookery book in New Zealand

- 2008 centenary edition
- Language: English
- Publication place: New Zealand
- Media type: Print
- Dewey Decimal: 641.5

The third (1914) edition of the Edmonds 'Sure to Rise' Cookery Book.

The Edmonds Cookery Book is a recipe book by Edmonds that focuses on traditional New Zealand cuisine. It was first published as The Sure to Rise Cookery Book in 1908 as a marketing tool by baking powder manufacturer Thomas Edmonds (today part of Goodman Fielder), but it is now known as a Kiwi icon.

Before the cookery book was created, Edmonds put recipes in the lids of the baking powder tins. The book was first published in 1908, originally named the Sure To Rise Cookery Book with 50 pages. Only two copies of the first edition are known to survive. Over the years, the cookbook has gone through numerous editions and reprints, evolving with changing tastes and kitchen technology.

In 1930 the first edition with photos was released. Originally, housewives could write a request to Edmonds to get a free copy. Couples in the 1940s who announced that they had become engaged in the newspaper would receive a free cookbook.

The first "De Luxe" edition appeared in 1955, and since then, the book has become a paid product. The same year, the front cover began featuring the iconic Edmonds factory in Linwood, Christchurch (demolished in 1990). The 1971 book was dedicated to gas cooking. The 1976 edition introduced spiral binding to allow the book to stay open and flat, as well as dual imperial and metric measurements to coincide with metrication in New Zealand. A microwave baking section was added in 1988, while international foods and nutritional information was added in 1993.

The 69th De Luxe edition was released in 2016. The 2012 edition has over 500 recipes.

With over three million copies sold by 2015, it is the best-selling New Zealand published book as of 2019, and has been described by journalist Ron Palenski as "much a part of New Zealand kitchens as a stove and knife". It has also been called a New Zealand icon, Kiwiana, and has appeared on a 2008 stamp series featuring national icons for each letter of the alphabet.
