= Charles Fulwood =

American media and communications strategist

Charles Cinque Fulwood (born 1950, in South Carolina) is a media and communications strategist who pioneered global media campaigns and the use of commercial marketing techniques for non-profit organizations. Over a 15-year period beginning in the mid-1980s, he served as communications director for Amnesty International USA, Natural Resources Defense Council, and the Children's Defense Fund. Fulwood was chief media strategist for the Human Rights Now! Tour, the 1988 world music tour underwritten by Reebok International to promote the United Nations Universal Declaration of Human Rights on 5 continents. Fulwood is also credited with designing the campaign strategy that led 18 states to pass legislation that exempts juveniles from the death penalty.

As Director of Communications at NRDC, Fulwood built a strategic communications operation that included media relations, web site, publications, and a quarterly journal with a circulation of more than 700,000. One of his many innovations was creation of the International ECO-Awards, which issued more than 100 honors to advertising agencies, design shops, businesses and environmental groups for creativity in promoting appreciation of the environment.

Fulwood's writing has been published in the St. Petersburg Times, The Atlanta Journal-Constitution, PR Quarterly, the Boston Phoenix, and Ramparts magazine. He has also ghost-written op-ed pieces published in The New York Times, The Boston Globe, The Christian Science Monitor, The San Francisco Chronicle, and the Los Angeles Times. He has given invited lectures at the Johns Hopkins Bloomberg School of Public Health, DePaul University College of Law, and Morehouse School of Medicine and has spoken at a variety of national and international conferences.

Fulwood was born in 1950 in Clarendon County, South Carolina and moved to St. Petersburg, Florida with his family in the early 1960s. After earning a bachelor's degree in mass communication, he worked for Pinellas County, Florida government, then held a series of communications positions with civil rights organizations in Atlanta before moving to New York City to work for Amnesty International USA.

In 1990, the Invisible Empire, Knights of the Ku Klux Klan, the most violent of the various Klan factions, sued Fulwood and his client, the Center for Democratic Renewal, for defamation of character after they exposed Klan activity within the Blakely, Georgia Fire Department. The suit was settled in 1991 and resulted in four Klansmen being forced to resign from the Fire Department.

Fulwood is a founding partner in MediaVision USA, a strategic communications firm, and specializes in litigation communications, crisis communications, and media campaigns. He is a former member of the teaching faculty at the Johns Hopkins University program in Communications and Contemporary Society, where he and Margo Edmunds were co-instructors for a graduate course in Emergency and Risk Communications from 2008-2013. Fulwood also consulted on the online course in risk communication strategies for the Johns Hopkins Center for Public Health Preparedness. Fulwood currently resides in the Glover Washington, DC area. In November 2011, he was elected to the Advisory Neighborhood Commission for Glover Park, which represents the neighborhood and provides advice to the DC government on key public policy issues.

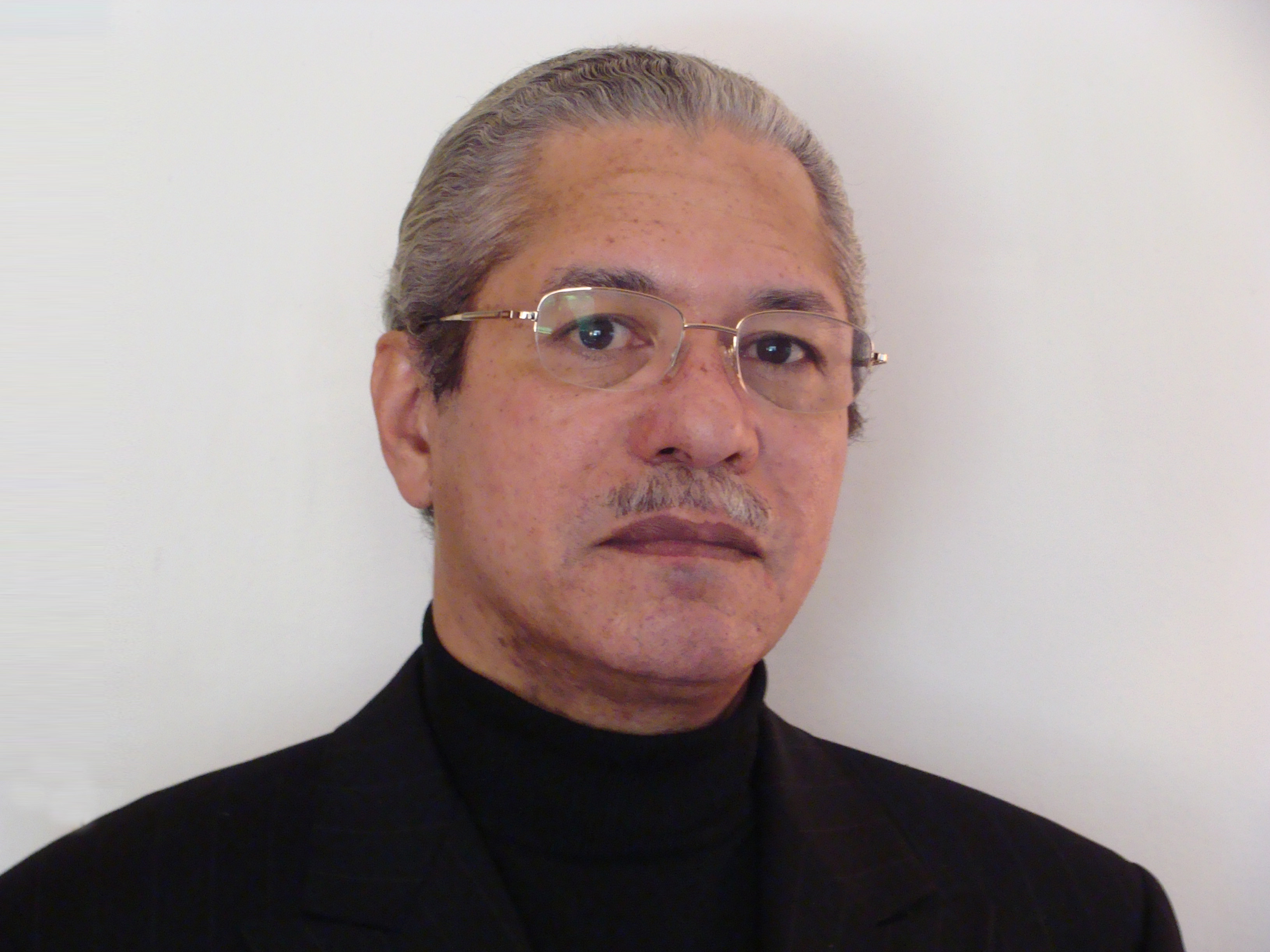
Charles Fulwood is a media and communications strategist who
