= Claude Sosthène Grasset d'Orcet =

- Born: 6 June 1828; Aurillac, France
- Died: 2 December 1900 (aged 72); Cusset, France
- Occupation(s): Archaeologist, writer, journalist

Claude Sosthene Grasset d'Orcet (6 June 1828 at Aurillac – 2 December 1900 at Cusset) was a French archaeologist, writer, exponent of the esoteric and founder of the study of French mythology.

== Life ==
Claude Sosthene Grasset was the son of Pierre-Joseph Grasset, the Mayor of Mauriac, and Antoinette-Athénaïs de Chalembel, daughter of the Mayor of Cusset. He studied at the College of Aurillac and then the College of Juilly, where the Abbé Constant, the future Eliphas Levi, introduced him to the study of esoteric subjects. Grasset d'Orcet then went to Paris where he studied at the Faculty of Law. He then studied sculpting at the École des Beaux-Arts in the studio of Elias Robert, who prompted him to travel to Greece, then throughout the Middle East. While in Cyprus he married Clémence-Félicie Lafon, daughter of a former medical officer based in Nicosia.

Between 1848 and 1851 he frequented the Café de la Régence in Paris, where he met Alfred de Musset (who intoxicated him with a mixture of beer and absinthe), the novelist Théophile Gautier and the librettist Henri Murger. He participated in the French Revolution of 1848, enlisting in a company of the 10th legion commanded by the Marquis Louis Felicien de Saulcy (1807–1880). This was the start of a long relationship between the two men.

He moved to Cyprus for several years, where he began excavations and discovered many items of which some were carried back to France in 1859 by de Saulcy on his return from the Holy Land, and form the basis of the Cypriot Archaeology collection in the Louvre. He then participated in two archaeological missions, first in Phoenicia with Ernest Renan in 1859–1861 and again in Cyprus with Charles-Jean-Melchior de Vogüé and the architect Edmond Duthoit in 1862–1864.

Before 1870, Grasset d'Orcet worked as a journalist for the newspapers La Cloche and Le Figaro, and was a reporter for the Havas agency during the Paris Commune. He worked for 27 years at the La Revue britannique, in which he published 218 articles, the first in 1873 on "Alcoholism in literature", and made numerous translations.

== Bibliography ==
- Archéologie mystérieuse (Mysterious Archaeology) (in French). Paris.
- Œuvres décryptées (Decrypted Works) (in French). Paris.
- Souvenirs (Memories) (in French). Paris.
- Histoire du cheval à travers les âges (History of the horse through the ages) (in French). Paris.
- Histoire secrète de l'Europe (Secret History of Europe) (in French). Paris.
- Chroniques et Récits d'Auvergne {Chronicles and Tales of Auvergne} (in French). Paris.
- La Croix de verre, Siège de Lyon (Glass Cross, Siege of Lyon) (in French). Paris.
- Matériaux cryptographiques (Cryptographic materials) (in French). Éditions les Trois R. 1983.
- Hiéroglyphie dans l'Art Antique (Hieroglyphs in Ancient Art), Sosthène Grasset et la découverte de l'archéologie chypriote (Sosthene Grasset and the discovery of Cypriot Archaeology) (in French). Éditions les Trois R. 2002. ISBN 2-911129-03-2.

== Sources ==
- Notice nécrologique sur Grasset d'Orcet, 1900, Revue Britannique.
- Grasset d'Orcet, docteur en grimoires, by Valérie Gentil, 1993, mémoire de maîtrise, Université de Bordeaux,
- L'imaginaire de la nation chez l'ésotériste Grasset d'Orcet, by Jean-Claude Drouin, in L'Imaginaire de la nation, actes du colloque européen de Bordeaux, 1991, Bordeaux, PU Bordeaux.
