= François-Joseph de Champagny =

French author and historian (1804–1882)

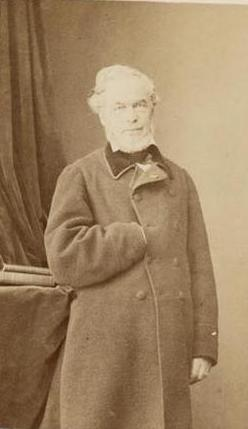
François-Joseph de Champagny.

François-Joseph de Champagny, 4th Duke of Cadore (8 September 1804, Vienna – 4 May 1882 Paris) was a French writer and historian. He was the thirteenth member elected to occupy seat 4 of the Académie française in 1869.

== Biography ==
François-Joseph-Marie-Thérèse de Nompère de Champagny was the son of Jean-Baptiste Nompère de Champagny, duc de Cadore (1756-1834), who was ambassador to Austria at the time of his birth, and was named after his godfather Francis II, Holy Roman Emperor.

He was a Magistrate and journalist, writing for Le Correspondant magazine.

A devout Catholic Church, he wrote numerous historical works on Ancient Rome and the beginnings of Christendom, as well as various political works.

He was also a historian and Opinion journalism, a contributor to the Revue des deux Mondes, founder and editor of La Revue contemporaine, and several times a candidate for the Académie française, supported by François Guizot and Félix Dupanloup; Elected on April 29, 1869 to replace Pierre-Antoine Berryer, he was not, despite being a royalist and clericalist, a candidate clearly hostile to Napoleon III; two of his brothers were official deputies, and his election was the subject of haggling between Guizot's political party and the imperialists, which ended in confusion for the latter; he was received on March 10, 1870 by Ustazade Silvestre de Sacy, and he received Émile Littré.

He was also a member of the Société d'archéologie et d'histoire de Seine-et-Marne and owner of the Château des Trois-Moulins (a locality straddling the communes of Maincy, Melun and Rubelles).

He is buried in the Montparnasse Cemetery (3rd division, 315 P 1834).

== Bibliography ==
- "François-Joseph de Champagny (1804-1882)" (in French). Académie française. 2009. Archived from the original on 2008-11-19.
