= Edmond =

Edmond may refer to:

== Arts and entertainment ==
- Edmond (play), a 1982 play by David Mamet
  - Edmond (film), a 2005 film based on the 1982 play
- E.d.M.O.N.D, a 2013 EP by Edmond Leung
- Edmond, a 2016 play by Alexis Michalik
  - Edmond, a 2019 film adaptation of the play, written and directed by Michalik
- Berlin Edmond (born 1992), American YouTuber known online as Berleezy

== Places ==
- Edmond, Kansas
- Edmond, Oklahoma
- Edmonds, Washington
- Edmond, West Virginia

== Others ==
- Edmond (given name)
- Edmond (1833), a passenger sailing ship that sank off the coast of Ireland in 1850
- Edmond, a racehorse that was the joint favourite for the 2001 Grand National
- Edmond, the nickname of the Edmontosaurus mummy SMF R 4036

== See also ==
- Edmund (disambiguation)
- Edward (disambiguation)
