= Thomas Edmonds (manufacturer) =

Creator of Edmonds baking powder in New Zealand

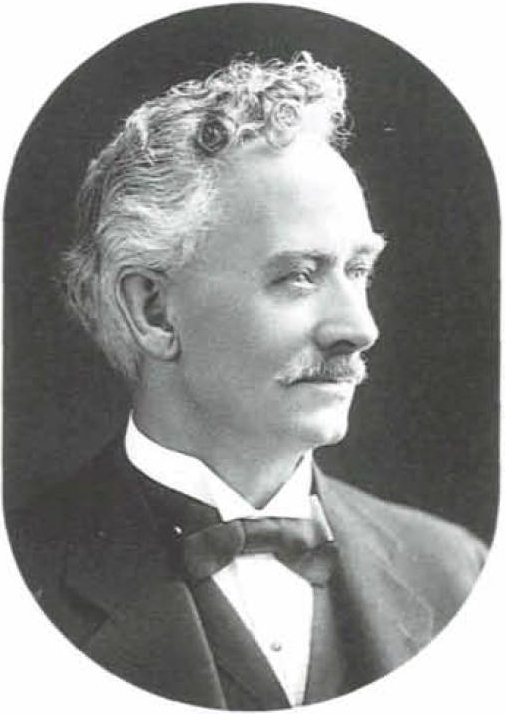
- Undated portrait of Edmonds
- Born: Thomas John Edmonds; 13 October 1858; Poplar, London, England
- Died: 2 June 1932 (aged 73); Christchurch, New Zealand
- Occupation: Manufacturer
- Spouse: Jane Irvine (m. 1879)
- Children: 8

Thomas John Edmonds (13 October 1858 – 2 June 1932) was a British-born New Zealand businessman and philanthropist, who created and manufactured Edmonds "Sure to Rise" baking powder and the Edmonds Cookery Book. He also financed the construction of several buildings in Christchurch, including gifting the city a band rotunda and a clock tower in 1929.

== Early life ==
Edmonds was born on 13 October 1858 in Poplar, London, and in his early years worked for London confectionery manufacturer F. Allen and Son, where he became familiar with the powders used to make sherbet. He married Jane Irvine on 8 June 1879, and both migrated to New Zealand, arriving at Lyttelton aboard the Waitangi on 26 September 1879. Edmonds set up a grocery store in Woolston, on the corner of what is now Edmonds and Randolph Streets.

== Business career ==
After learning about the poor reliability of the baking powder then available, he set about formulating his own baking powder and sold the first batch of 200 tins from his own store. Edmonds said he first coined the slogan "sure to rise" when he was reassuring a customer that her scones would not be flat if she used his product. He spent three years perfecting the formula, and travelled around Canterbury marketing his baking powder to households. If the occupants wouldn't buy the baking powder, he would give them a tin for free and would take it back if they were unsatisfied. Edmonds recalled in 1922 that no tins were ever returned.

His company, T. J. Edmonds Limited, produced custard powder, egg powder and self-raising flour in addition to baking powder.

The first Edmonds Cookery Book was released by Edmonds in 1908, as a promotional tool for his company's products. The cook book, through numerous expansions, revisions and reprints, is now New Zealand's best-selling book.

In 1926, Edmonds set up the Australian Cream of Tartar company in Sydney to manufacture cream of tartar and tartaric acid.

== Philanthropy ==
Edmonds financed the construction of several buildings in Christchurch, including the Edmonds factory and gardens, the Theosophical Society building, and the Repertory Theatre. None of these buildings survive: the Edmonds factory was controversially demolished in October 1990, and the Theosophical Society building and the Repertory Theatre were damaged beyond repair in the 2011 Christchurch earthquake. The Christchurch City Council acquired the remaining portion of the Edmonds factory gardens in 1991, which are now a public garden.

To commemorate the 50th anniversary of his migration to Christchurch, Edmonds gifted the city of Christchurch a band rotunda and a clock tower on the Avon River in the central city. The band rotunda was damaged in the 2011 earthquake, and restoration was finished in 2021.

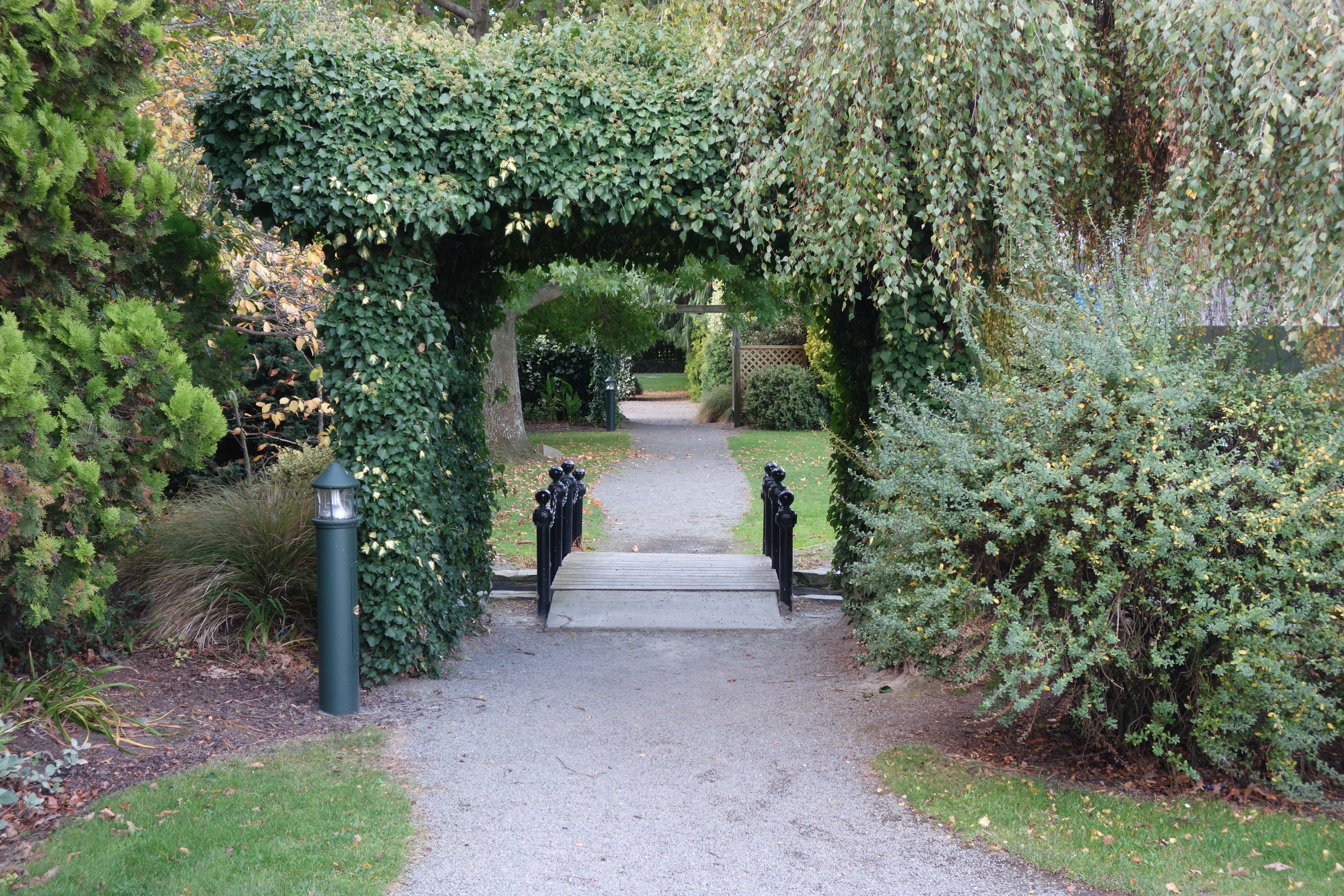
Edmonds Factory Garden (2016)

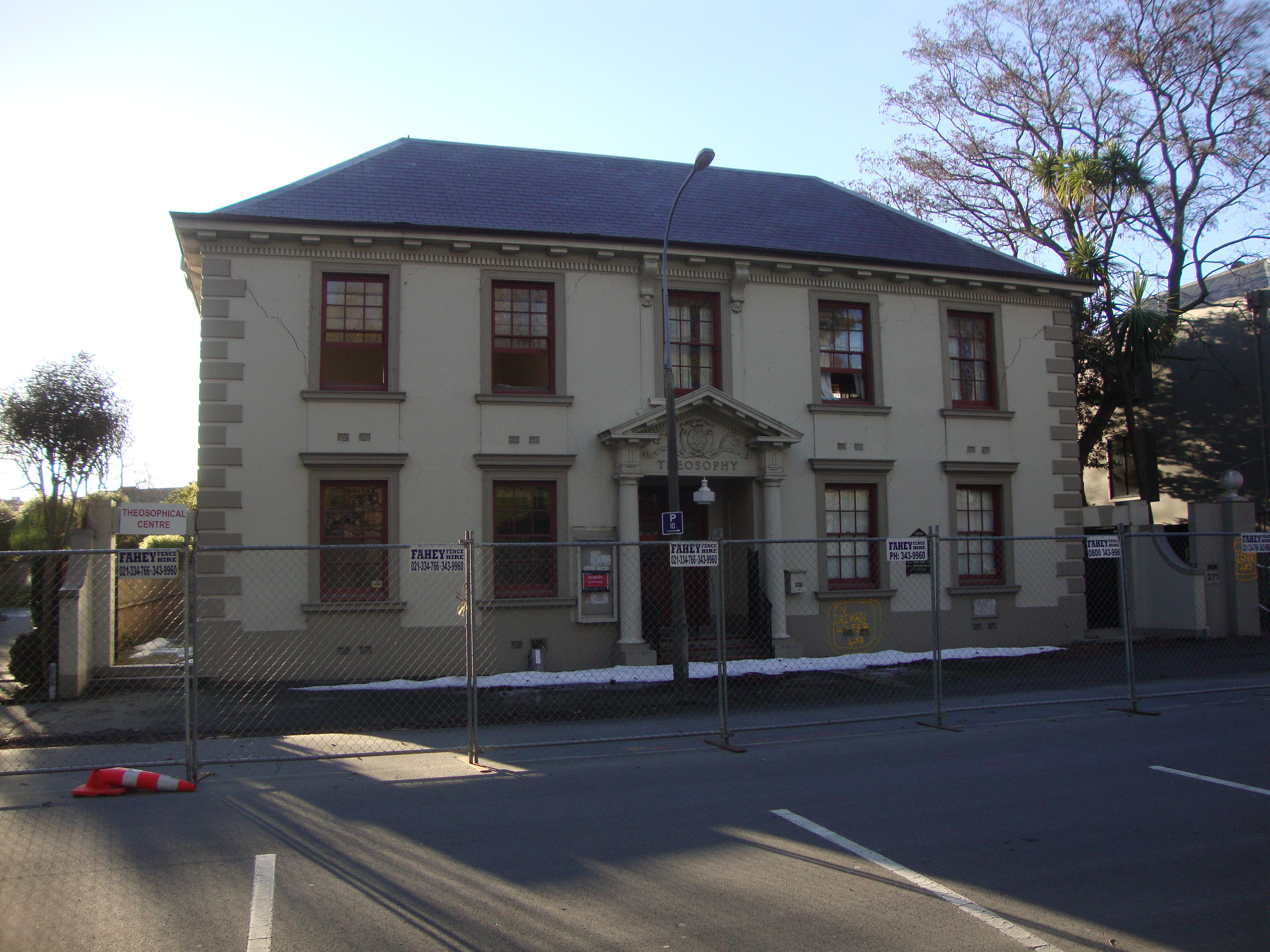
Theosophical Society Building (2011)

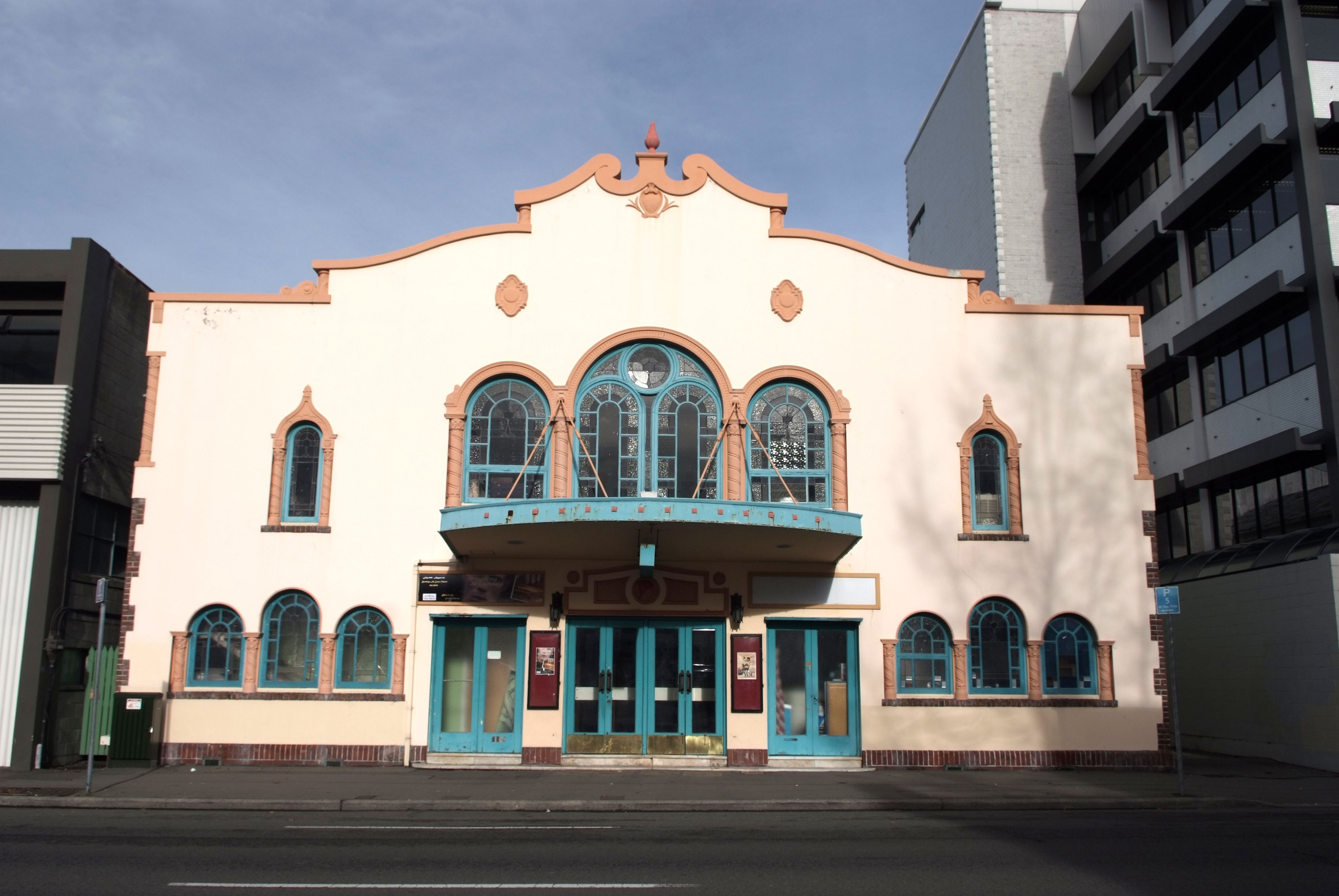
Repertory Theatre (2010)

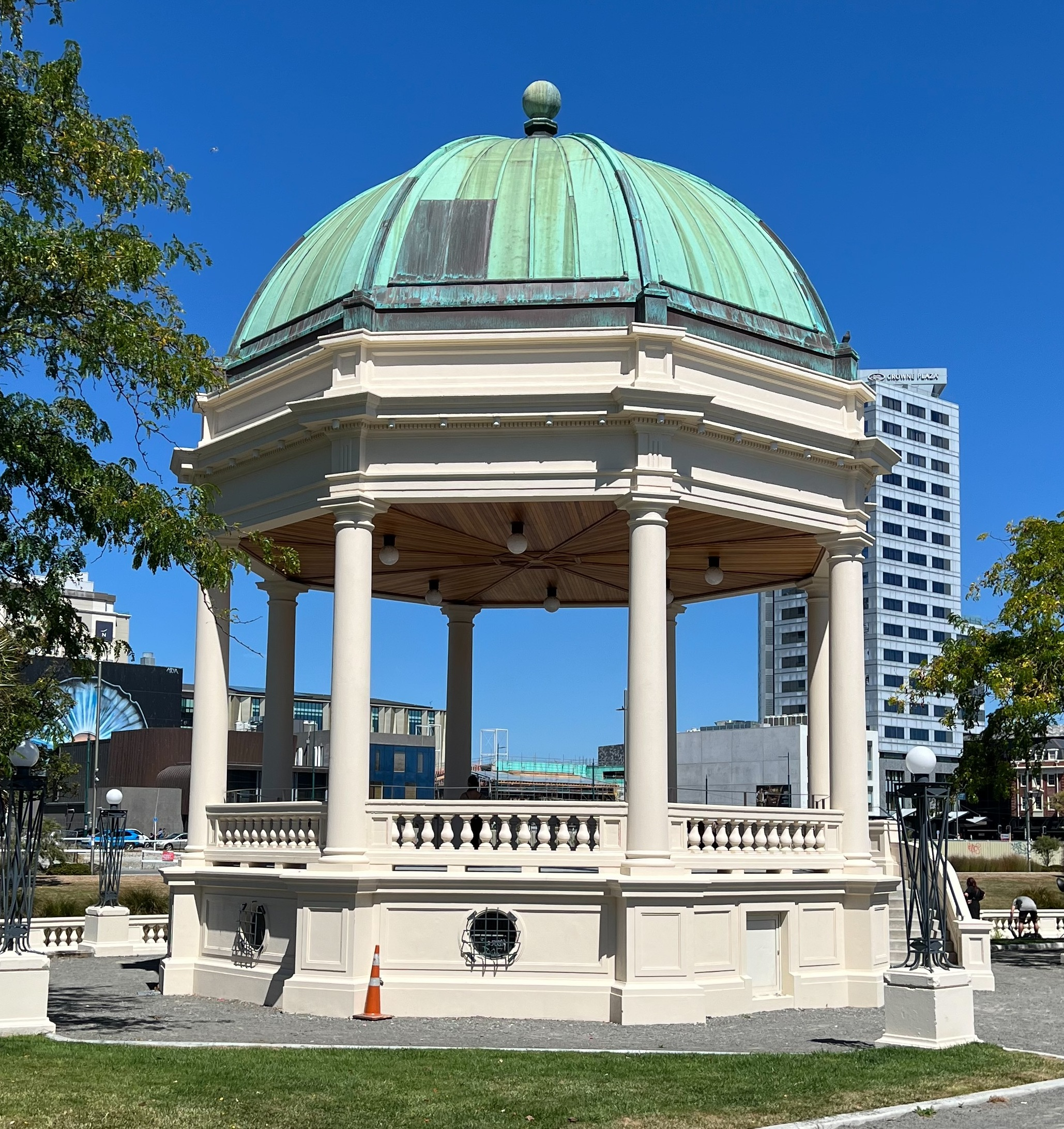
Edmonds Band Rotunda (2024)

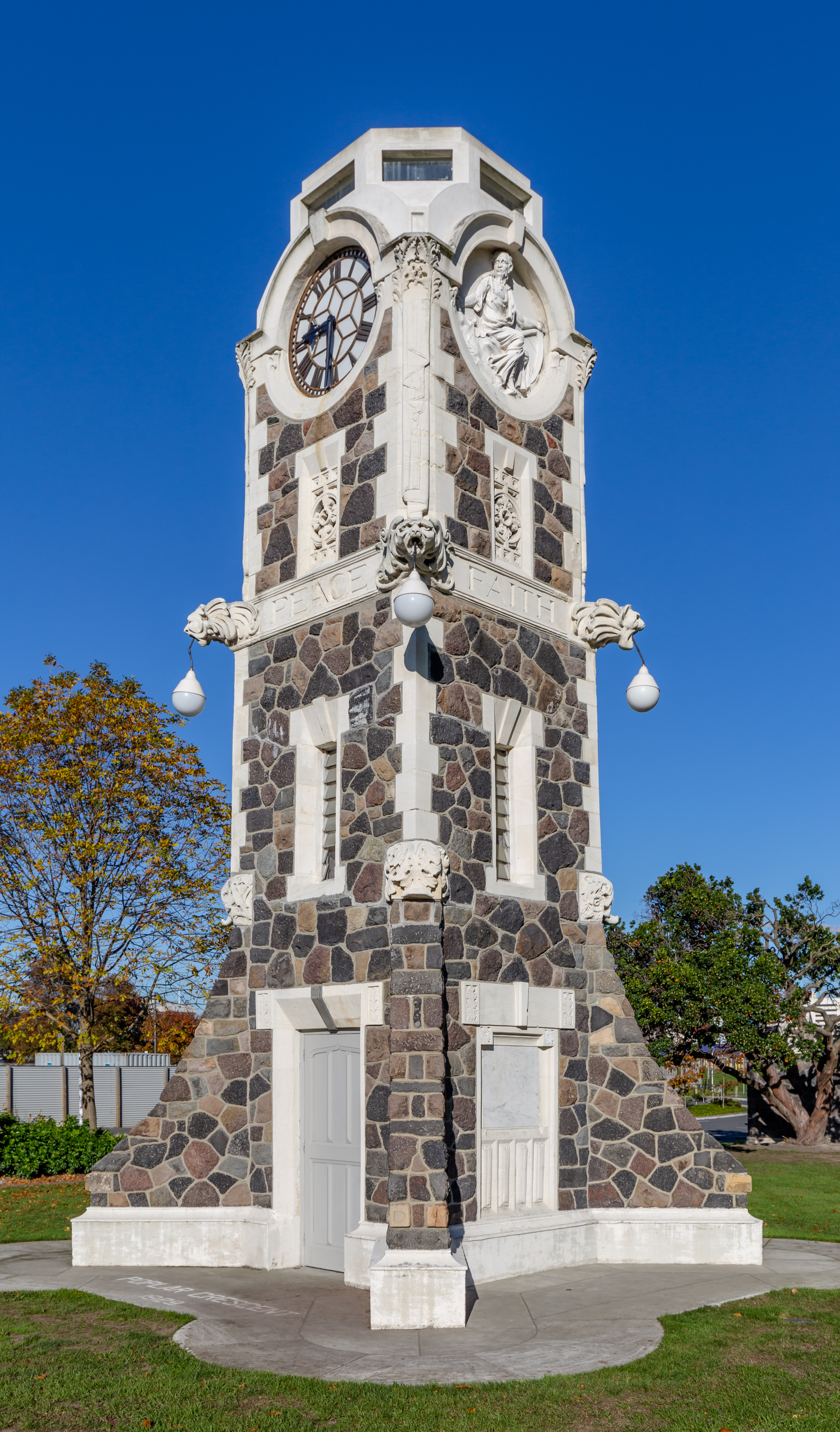
Edmonds Clock Tower (2019)

== Personal life ==
Edmonds had eight children: four sons and four daughters. His eldest son died in 1914.

Edmonds died of peritonitis on the evening of 2 June 1932, aged 73. His funeral took place on 5 June 1932, with Christchurch mayor Dan Sullivan delivering the eulogy. Edmonds is buried in Christchurch's Linwood Cemetery alongside his wife (died 1938) and two of their sons.

== Legacy ==
In 2005, Edmonds was ranked 45th in New Zealand's Top 100 History Makers. In 2017, he was posthumously inducted into the New Zealand Business Hall of Fame.
