= College of Juilly =

Catholic teaching seminary in France

Collège de Juilly
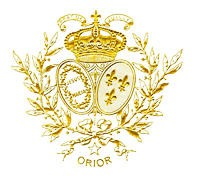

Location
- 7 rue Barre; Juilly, Seine-et-Marne, 77230; France
- Coordinates: 49°00′40″N 2°42′22″E

Information
- Motto: Orior (I rise)
- Religious affiliation: Oratoire de France
- Established: 1638; 388 years ago
- Closed: 2012

The College of Juilly (French: Collège de Juilly) was a Catholic private teaching establishment located in the commune of Juilly, in Seine-et-Marne (France). Directed by the French Oratorians, it was created in 1638 by the Congregationists headed by Father Charles de Condren.

According to the legend, Saint Geneviève stopped in the village of Juilly in 470, and a water source suddenly emerged where she prayed. The spot quickly became a pilgrimage place, and the College was built around it. An abbey established itself there during the 12th century, while Blanche of Castile, the mother of Saint-Louis, decided in the 13th century to establish there an orphanage which hosted the children of those knights killed during the Crusades. Joan of Arc might have sojourned there while coming back from Orleans.

The monks quit the abbey in 1637 and handed it out to the Oratorians, who created an internship for the education of the French nobility. The abbey then became a Royal Academy, and retained the three fleur-de-lys on its arm. The Juilly College also served many times as a war hospital.

Its library notably contained a reproduction of the United States Declaration of Independence, which was offered to La Fayette, as well as Diderot's original Encyclopédie. The school closed due to financial difficulties in 2012 and the property subjected to vandalism and decay. As of 2021 local interests proposed redevelopment of the school property into residential apartments.

== Famous former students ==
- Jean de La Fontaine (1621–1695)
- Richard Simon (1638–1712)
- Henri de Boulainvilliers (1658–1722)
- James FitzJames, 1st Duke of Berwick (1660–1734)
- Montesquieu (1689–1755)
- Pierre Victor, baron Malouet (1740–1814)
- Louis de Bonald (1754–1840)
- Étienne-Denis Pasquier (1767–1862)
- Jean-Baptiste Benoît Eyriès (1767–1846)
- Alexandre-Étienne Choron (1771–1834)
- Jérôme Bonaparte (1784–1860)
- Antoine Pierre Berryer (1790–1868)
- Claude Sosthène Grasset d'Orcet (1828–1900)
- Jean Fourastié (1907–1990) (inventor of the expression Trente Glorieuses)
- Claude Brasseur (1936–2020)
- Jacques Mesrine (1936–1979)
- Michel Polnareff (1958-1959)
- Philippe Noiret

== Former teachers ==
- Louis Eugène Marie Bautain (1796–1867)
- Joseph Fouché (1763–1820)
