= Redvern Edmunds =

Welsh footballer

Personal information
- Full name: Redvern Esmond Edmunds
- Date of birth: 10 January 1943 (age 83)
- Place of birth: Newport, Wales
- Position: Winger

Senior career*
Years	Team	Apps	(Gls)
1960–1961	Portsmouth	6	(0)
1961–1962	Newport County	4	(0)
1962	Merthyr Tydfil		
1962–1963	Abergavenny Thursdays		
1963–1965	Latrobe		
1966	Brisbane Hakoah		
- * Club domestic league appearances and goals

Redvern Esmond Edmunds (born 10 January 1943) is a Welsh former professional footballer.

Edmunds played six times for Portsmouth in the 1960–61 season. In 1961 he transferred to Newport County where he played four matches in the 1961–62 season.
