= Edmond Göldlin =

Swiss fencer

Personal information
- Born: 3 November 1907

Sport
- Sport: Fencing

Edmond Göldlin (born 3 November 1907, date of death unknown) was a Swiss fencer. He competed in the team épée event at the 1936 Summer Olympics.
