= Edmunds =

Edmunds may refer to:

== People ==
- Edmunds (given name)
- Edmunds (surname)

== Places ==
- Edmunds Center, an arena in Deland, Florida
- Edmunds County, South Dakota

== Companies ==
- Edmunds (company), provider of automotive information

== See also ==
- Edmonds (disambiguation)
- Edmund (disambiguation)
