= Edmond (given name) =

Other names
- Related names: Edmund

Edmond is a given name related to Edmund. Persons named Edmond include:

- Edmond Canaple (1797–1876), French politician
- Edmond Chehade (born 1993), Lebanese footballer
- Edmond Conn (1914–1998), American farmer, businessman, and politician
- Edmond Gionet (1931–2019), American politician
- Edmond Göldlin (1907-?), Swiss fencer
- Edmond de Goncourt (1822–1892), French writer
- Edmond Etling (before 1909–1940), French designer, manufacturer
- Edmond Halley (1656–1742), English astronomer, geophysicist, mathematician, meteorologist, and physicist
- Edmond Haxhinasto (born 1966), Albanian politician
- Edmond Maire (1931–2017), French labor union leader
- Edmond Morelle (1880–?), French racing driver and aviator who raced mononymously as Edmond
- Edmond Rostand (1868–1918), French poet and dramatist
- Edmond James de Rothschild (1845–1934), French member of the Rothschild banking family
- Edmond O'Brien (1915–1985), American actor of stage, screen, television and film director
- Edmond Panariti (born 1960), Albanian foreign affairs minister
- Edmond Robinson (born 1992), American gridiron footballer
- Edmond L. Smith (1829–1891), American politician from Pennsylvania and Colorado
- Edmond Tarverdyan, controversial fight trainer in MMA

== In fiction ==
- Edmond Burke, the protagonist and title character of the 1982 play Edmond
  - Edmond Burke, the protagonist and title character of the 2005 film Edmond, an adaptation of the play
- Edmond Dantès, the protagonist and title character of the 1844 novel The Count of Monte Cristo
- Edmond Elephant, a character from the Peppa Pig franchise
- Edmond Honda, a character from the Street Fighter franchise
- Edmond, the protagonist of the 1991 film Rock-a-Doodle

== See also ==
- Edmund (disambiguation)
- Edward
- Edmundo
