= Edmond Canaple =

French politician (1797–1876)

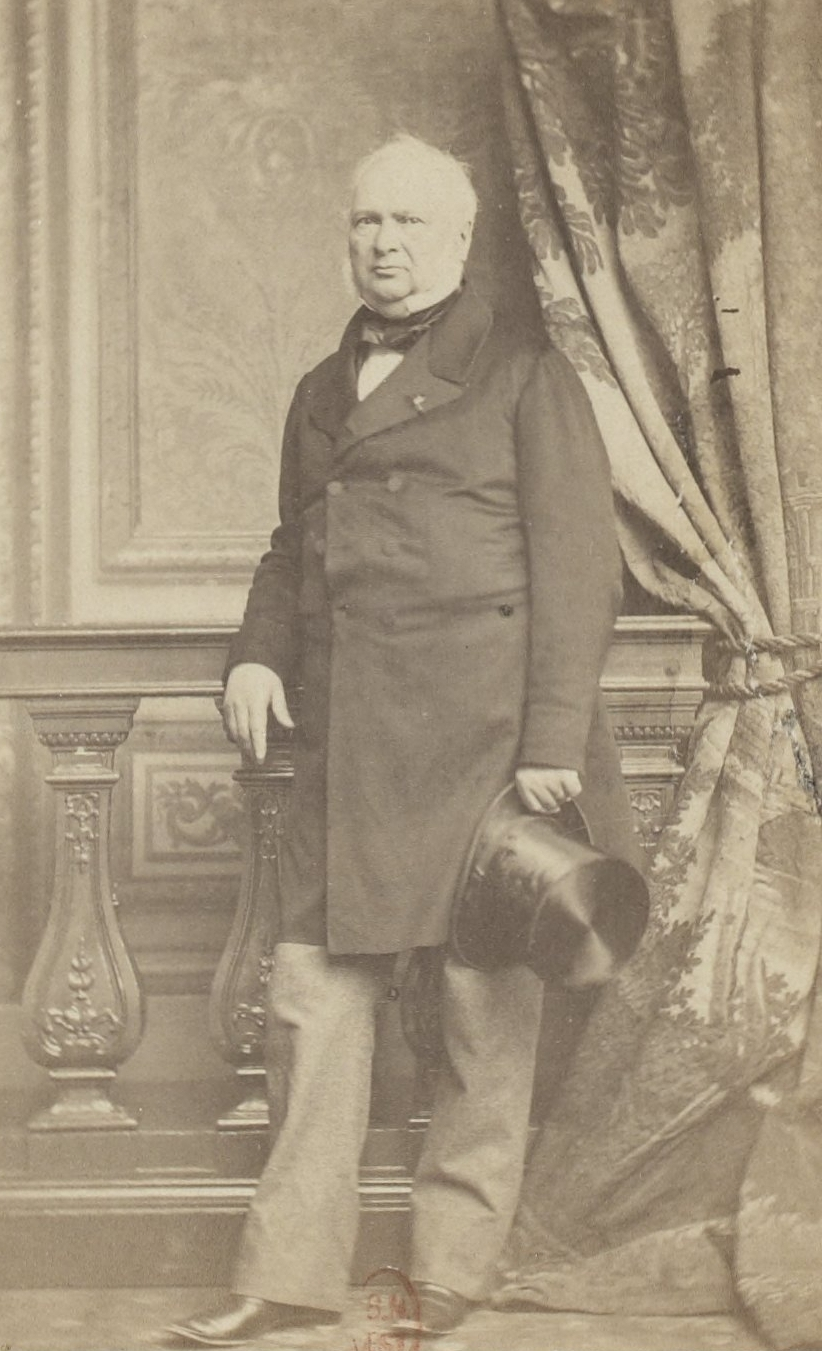
- Born: 18/19 November 1797; Marseille, France
- Died: 8 June 1876 (aged 78); Marseille, France
- Education: College of Juilly
- Occupation: Politician

Edmond Canaple (18/19 November 1797 – 8 June 1876) was a French politician. He served as a member of the Corps législatif from 1855 to 1863.
