= Greg Edmonson (artist) =

Canadian painter (born 1960)

Greg Edmonson (born 1960, Calgary, Alberta) is a Canadian painter. He is primarily known for his paintings of fractured landscape and portrait paintings, and his Soviet Pangaea series of paintings which featured large scale portraits of faces from history. He received his master's degree in fine art from the University of Alberta.

== Soviet Pangaea (1993) ==
"Neutral Ground Exhibition" (1993)

Pangaea is a hypothetical landmass that existed when all continents were joined about 200-300 million years ago before breaking up. "In forming the Soviet Union, many borders were disregarded in an attempt to merge cultural identities and alter personal bonds. In this body of work, Edmonson focuses attention on boundaries that have come together and have been divided and subdivided and on the tentative foundation on which political, social and religious beliefs are based". "Soviet Pangaea serves as a metaphor for all political and natural unions. Through this body of work, Edmonson points to the certainty of an everchanging world where history is represented as evolution and evolution results in the individuality of each culture and person."

== Fractured paintings (1996) ==
"Indefinite Divisibility", 63x51" (1996)

"The images are based on old photographs from Russia which Edmonson uses as raw material - selecting fragments and snippets of characteristics from different individuals, the common people, reinterpreting and creating new faces that are amalgamations of several..." Edmonson's use of shadows metaphorically suggests the fragmentary nature of history and memory - parts hidden from view, others slowly emerging from which we can begin to formulate an understanding of the whole. In a 1994 artist's statement, Edmonson commented that an earlier interest in tar pits in Alberta led to his archeological interpretation of memory: "where amongst the dark matter of tar have been found the remnants of life forms, which act as a kind of physical symbol of how time displaces history and memory."

== Collections ==
His paintings are seen today in collections including those of Microsoft, the Toronto-Dominion Bank, the Canada Council Art Bank, the Art Gallery of Alberta, the Glenbow Museum, the University of Lethbridge Art Gallery, the Nickle Galleries, the Art Gallery of Greater Victoria, the Alberta Art Foundation, the Carleton University Art Gallery, the Department of External Affairs(Canada), and the Albright College Museum.
