= Tom Edmonds (footballer) =

Scottish footballer

Personal information
- Full name: Thomas Edmonds
- Date of birth: 6 August 1878
- Place of birth: Edinburgh, Scotland
- Date of death: Unknown
- Position: Centre-half

Youth career
- Prestonpans Athletic

Senior career*
Years	Team	Apps	(Gls)
- Dundee
1903–1904	Preston North End	0	(0)
1904–1905	Southport		
1905–1906	Southampton	9	(0)
- * Club domestic league appearances and goals

Thomas Edmonds (born 6 August 1878) was a Scottish professional footballer who played as a centre-half for Southampton in the Southern League in 1905–06.

== Football career ==
Edmonds was born in Edinburgh and played his early football with Prestonpans Athletic before joining Dundee. In October 1903, he moved to England to join Preston North End, where he remained until the following year, without making any first-team appearances. In 1904, he joined Southport of the Lancashire Combination where he gained a reputation as a reliable centre-half.

In May 1905, he was recruited by Southampton of the Southern League to replace Bert Dainty, who had moved to Scotland to join Dundee. Edmonds made his debut for the "Saints" in the opening match of the 1905–06 season, a 1–0 home defeat to Brentford. Described as "slim and wiry", he retained his place at centre-half for a further four matches before a succession of injuries put him out of the side until the last month of the season, by when Bert Lee had become established at No.5.

In the 1906 close season, he left Southampton and returned to Lancashire.
