= William Edmondson (footballer) =

English footballer

Personal information
- Full name: William Edmondson
- Place of birth: England
- Position: Winger

Senior career*
| Years | Team | Apps | (Gls) |
| 1902–1903 | Burnley | 2 | (0) |
- * Club domestic league appearances and goals

William Edmondson was an English professional association footballer who played as a winger. He played two matches in the Football League for Burnley in the 1902–03 season.
