= Olive Edmundson =

British horticulturalist

Olive Mary Edmundson (née Harrisson) (1881 - 1972) was a British horticulturalist who was denied a scholarship at the Royal Horticultural Society Garden in 1898.

Her parents were Henry and Louis Ann Harrisson. Harrisson attended Swanley Horticultural College. She was awarded the highest number of marks in the Royal Horticultural Society Certificate in Practical Horticulture. The prize was to work in the Royal Horticultural Society garden in Chiswick, £5,000 and a scholarship. Her success was rejected by the Royal Horticultural Society, who only accepted men at the time. This was despite women making up half of the top candidates. Harrisson was supported by Reverend William Wilks, then secretary of the Royal Horticultural Society. She was presented with a medal to recognise her efforts, which she kept throughout her life. She went on to work as a professional gardener.

In 1901 she was employed by the Cadbury family at Northfield Manor House. She married Herbert Watson Edmundson, an electrical engineer, on 25 May 1904. She looked after her daughter's garden that was in the grounds of a Friends meeting house in Settle, West Riding of Yorkshire. Her story emerged after a researcher at the Royal Horticultural Society Lindley Library discovered a document in the archives. The story was covered by the BBC, and listeners identified who the document was discussing.

Edmundson died in 1972 in Settle.
