= Pocahontas Wight Edmunds =

American author and suffragist

Pocahontas Wight Edmunds (November 8, 1904-1999) was an author and civic leader in the United States. She wrote a two volume history of Halifax County, Virginia. She wrote about E. H. Harriman and another on Rutherford B. Hayes with H. J. Eckenrode.

She was born in Richmond, Virginia in 1904. She graduated from St. Catherine’s School and Agnes Scott College. She also studied in Paris where she was roommates with Angela Gregory. After returning from Paris, she accepted a job teaching Latin in Halifax County, Virginia. There she met Richard Coles Edmunds whom she married in 1929. They settled in Halifax, Virginia.

In addition to writing many books, she founded the Halifax County Garden Club and served as its president. She led home tours. In 2015, the Halifax County Historical Society republished two of her books.

She was a direct descendant of Pocahontas. She knew and wrote about the composer and eugenicist John Powell. She married Richard Cole Edmunds. They had three children, Richard Coles Edmunds, Jr., Anne Edmunds Brown, and Elizabeth Edmunds Grinnan. She died in 1999, in Richmond, Virginia.

== Writings ==
- Rutherford B. Hayes; Statesman of Reunion (1930), with H. J. Eckenrode
- E. H. Harriman: The Little Giant on Wall Street, with H. J. Eckenrode (1933)
- Land of sand; legends of the North Carolina coast Garrett and Massie Incorporated (1941)
- Land of Sand - Tales of the Virginia Coast (1950)
- The Pocahontas-John Smith Story (1956)
- Tar Heels Track the Century (1966)
- Virginians Out Front Richmond, Whittet & Shepperson (1972)
- History of Halifax: Documentation (1977)
