= Edmund =

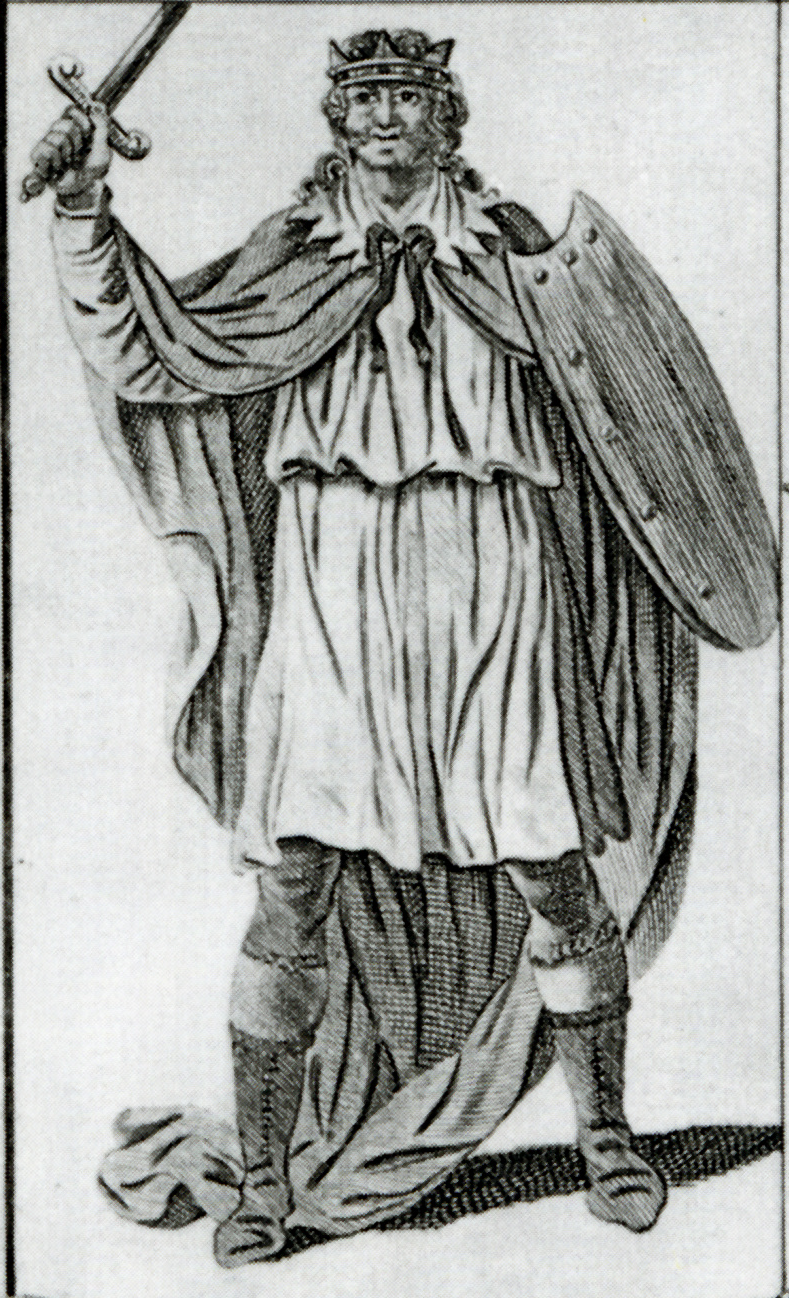
- Edmund I of England
- Pronunciation: /ˈɛdmənd/ Old English: [ˈæːɑdmund]
- Gender: Masculine
- Language: English

Origin
- Language: Old English
- Derivation: ēad + mund
- Meaning: "prosperity", "riches" + "protector"

Other names
- Variant form: Eadmund
- Derivatives: Eamonn, Edmond, Edmundo

Edmund is a masculine given name in the English language. The name is derived from the Old English elements ēad, meaning "prosperity" or "riches", and mund, meaning "protector".

Persons named Edmund include:

== People ==
=== Kings and nobles ===
- Edmund the Martyr (died 869 or 870), king of East Anglia
- Edmund I (922–946), King of England from 939 to 946
- Edmund Ironside (989–1016), also known as Edmund II, King of England in 1016
- Edmund of Scotland (after 1070 – after 1097)
- Edmund Crouchback (1245–1296), son of King Henry III of England and claimant to the Sicilian throne
- Edmund, 2nd Earl of Cornwall (1249–1300), earl of Cornwall; English nobleman of royal descent
- Edmund of Langley, 1st Duke of York (1341–1402), son of King Edward III of England
- Edmund Tudor, earl of Richmond (1430–1456), English and Welsh nobleman
- Edmund, Prince of Schwarzenberg (1803–1873), the last created Austrian field marshal of the 19th century

=== In religion ===
- Saint Edmund (disambiguation), religious title given to several persons
- Eadmund of Winchester (died between 833 and 838), once thought to have been a Bishop of Winchester
- Edmund of Durham (died 1041), Bishop of Durham
- Edmund Arrowsmith (1585–1628), Jesuit, one of the Forty Martyrs of England and Wales
- Edmund Campion (1540–1581), English Jesuit priest and martyr
- Edmund Gennings (1567–1591), English priest and martyr
- Edmund Kalau (1928–2014), German missionary and minister
- Edmund Peiris (1897–1989), Sri Lankan Roman Catholic priest, Bishop of Chilaw from 1940-1972
- Edmund Rich (1175–1240), also called Edmund of Abingdon; Archbishop of Canterbury
- Edmund Ignatius Rice (1762–1844), founder of the Congregation of Christian Brothers

=== In politics ===
- Edmund Burke (1729–1797), Irish statesman, political theorist, and philosopher
- Edmund Barton (1849−1920), Australian prime minister
- Edmund Hungate Beaghan (1703–1755), English politician
- E. J. Cooray, Sri Lankan Senator, Minister of Justice of Sri Lanka from March 1960 to July 1960
- E. B. Dimbulane, Sri Lankan Member of Parliament for Alutnuwara
- Edmund Rowland Gooneratne (1845–1914), Sri Lankan Gate Mudaliyar, scholar, planter, Buddhist revivalist
- Edmund L. Oldfield (1863–1938), American politician
- Edmund Walter Jayawardena, Sri Lankan lawyer and diplomat
- Edmund Muskie (1914–1996), American Secretary of State
- Edmund G. Brown, Sr. (1905–1996), commonly known as Pat Brown; governor of California, 1959–1967
- Edmund G. Brown, Jr. (born 1938), commonly known as Jerry Brown; governor of California
- Edmund Peiris, Sri Lankan Muhandiram
- Edmund Randolph (1753–1813), American founding father and governor of Virginia
- Edmund Samarakkody (1912–1992), Sri Lankan Trotskyist, trade unionist
- Edmund Stoiber (born 1941), German politician, former minister-president of the state of Bayern
- Edmund H. Taylor Jr. (1830–1923), American politician and distiller from Kentucky
- Edmund Tsaturyan (1937–2010), Armenian politician, member of the National Assembly of Armenia
- Edmund (Tiruchendur MLA), Indian politician, elected to the Tamil Nadu legislative assembly in 1971

=== In other fields ===
- Sir Edmund Andros (1637–1714), English colonial administrator under the Royal House of Stuart
- Edmund Anscombe (1874–1948), New Zealand architect
- Edmund Cobb (1892–1974), American actor
- Edmund Collein (1906–1992), East German architect and Bauhaus photographer
- Edmund Crispin, pseudonym of English crime fiction writer Bruce Montgomery (1921–1978)
- Edmund L. Cushing (1807–1883), chief justice of the New Hampshire Supreme Court
- Edmund Davy (1785–1857), English chemist
- Edmund Eagles, British painter
- Edmund Fritz (before 1918 – after 1932), Austrian actor, film director, and music manager
- Edmund H. Garrett (1853–1929), American artist
- Edmund Gettier (1927–2021), American philosopher
- Edmund Goulding (1891–1959), British film writer and director
- Edmund Gunter (1581–1626), British mathematician
- Edmund Gwenn (1877–1959), British actor
- Edmund Hashim (1933–1974), American actor
- Edmund Hewavitarne (1873–1915), Sri Lankan businessman and army reservist
- Sir Edmund Hillary (1919–2008), New Zealand mountaineer
- Edmund Husserl (1859–1938), philosopher and mathematician
- Edmund Ironside, 1st Baron Ironside, Sir William Edmund Ironside (1880–1951), field marshal and chief of the British Imperial General Staff
- Edmund Ironside, 2nd Baron Ironside (1924–2020), British politician and engineer, son of William Edmund Ironside
- Edmund Kemper (born 1948), American serial killer and necrophile
- Edmund Blair Leighton (1852–1922), British artist
- Edmund Lenihan (born 1950), Irish author and storyteller
- Edmund Lowe (1890–1971), American actor
- Edmund McMillen (born 1980), American video game designer
- Edmund P. Murray (1930–2007), American novelist and journalist
- Edmund Phelps (1933–2026), American Nobel Prize-winning economist
- Edmund Purdom (1926–2009), English film director and voice actor
- Edmund Rack (c. 1735–1787), English writer
- Edmund Reid (1846–1917), head of the Metropolitan Police's CID during the time of the Jack the Ripper
- Ed Skoronski (1910–1996), American football player
- Edmund Kirby Smith (1824–1893), American general, telegraph president, and professor of mathematics and botany.
- Edmund Sonnenblick (1932–2007), American cardiologist
- Edmund Spenser (1552–1599), English poet
- Edmund White (1940–2025), American writer
- Edmund Wilson (1895–1972), American writer and literary critic
- Edmund Yaghjian (1903–1997), Armenian-born American painter, educator
- Edmund Irvine (born 1965), Northern Irish racing driver and property investor
- Edmund Jordan (1948–2025), Irish motorsport executive, broadcaster, racing driver and businessman

== Fictional characters ==
- Edmund, an antagonist in the play King Lear by William Shakespeare
- Edmund Bertram, in the novel Mansfield Park by Jane Austen
- Edmund Blackadder, the protagonist of the BBC historical comedy series Blackadder
- Edmund Pevensie, main character in several of The Chronicles of Narnia book series by C. S. Lewis

== See also ==
- Edmunds (disambiguation)
- Edmond (given name)
- Edmund Ironside (disambiguation)
- Edmunds (given name)
- Edward
