= John Edmundson =

American Navy physician

Captain John Edmundson USN was the chief doctor at the Guantanamo Bay detainment camps, in Cuba.

During a reporter's tour of the 48-bed facility in January 2005, Edmundson revealed, in an off-hand comment, that 23 detainees had tried to hang themselves in a simultaneous mass-suicide bid in late 2003.

Following the June 10, 2006 suicide bid Edmundson told reporters that the three men had all had routine Psychological tests administered because they were participating in the recent hunger strike. Edmundson said that the men showed no sign of despair or suicidal tendencies.

Edmundson's boss, Admiral Harry Harris, stirred controversy by calling the suicides "acts of asymmetrical warfare". A June 28, 2006 Los Angeles Times article quotes Edmundson: "If you ask my opinion, I agree with the admiral that this was somewhat of a political statement."
