= Esmond =

Esmond can refer to:

== People ==
- Annie Esmond (1873–1945), British film actress
- Burton D. Esmond (1870–1944), American lawyer, politician
- Carl Esmond (1902–2004), Austrian actor
- Esmond Moses (born 1974), Micronesian politician
- Henry V. Esmond (1869–1922), English actor, playwright
- James Esmond (1822–1890), Irish-Australian gold prospector
- Jill Esmond (1908–1990), English actress
- Jimmy Esmond (1889–1948), American professional baseball player
- Rhoda A. Esmond (1819–1894), American philanthropist, temperance leader

== Literary characters ==
- The History of Henry Esmond, 1852 novel by William Makepeace Thackeray

== Places ==
- Esmond, Illinois
- Esmond, North Dakota
- Esmond, Rhode Island
- Esmond, South Dakota
- Esmond, Victoria, Australia
