= Margo Edmunds =

American health policy researcher

- Education: Penn State University
- Scientific career
- Fields: Health information technology
- Workplaces: Johns Hopkins Hospital

Margo Edmunds is an American health policy researcher, strategy consultant, educator, and writer who began her clinical career in disease management at Johns Hopkins Hospital. Her recent work has focused on the use of health information technology in healthcare reform and public health, including co-authoring Toward Health Information Liquidity, a Booz Allen Hamilton white paper that explores the challenges and opportunities for electronic health information systems.

Formerly Vice President with The Lewin Group, Edmunds has held senior positions at the University of California, San Francisco; Institute of Medicine (IOM) of the National Academies; Children's Defense Fund (CDF); and American Institutes for Research. At the IOM, she directed studies on health insurance and access to care and provided testimony on children's coverage to the U.S. Senate Finance Committee and the National Association of Insurance Commissioners.

In 2000, she and her team at CDF released All Over the Map, a report on progress implementing the State Children's Health Insurance Program. The report was used as a briefing and reference document for members of Congress and the Gore presidential campaign, and was widely covered by the media, including The New York Times.

In 2000, she co-founded MediaVision USA, a strategic communications firm. She co-teaches a course on Emergency and Risk Communication. She and her MediaVision partner, Charles Fulwood, collaborated on an online multimedia course on emergency preparedness communications for the Johns Hopkins Center for Public Health Preparedness, as well as a primer for health professionals on strategic communications. and also made several presentations at state, regional, and national conferences on public health preparedness. From 1999 to 2006, Edmunds was a member of the teaching faculty at the Johns Hopkins Bloomberg School of Public Health, where she introduced strategic communications and informatics to policy analysis and public health practice.

Edmunds received a Ph.D. in human development at The Pennsylvania State University, where she studied systems theory, policy analysis, and clinical psychology. She completed clinical training at the Behavioral Medicine and Biofeedback Clinic at the Johns Hopkins School of Medicine and is a Fellow and former member of the Board of Directors of the Society of Behavioral Medicine. She chaired the Health IT Interest Group for AcademyHealth from 2007 to June 2010. She is also a member of the Public Policy Committee and the Public Health Informatics Workgroup of the American Medical Informatics Association.
