= Edmund (disambiguation) =

Edmund is an English masculine given name.

Edmund may also refer to:

== Places ==
- Edmund, South Carolina, United States, a census-designated place
- Edmund, Wisconsin, United States, an unincorporated community

== People with the surname ==
- G. R. Edmund (1931–2013), Indian politician
- Kyle Edmund (born 1995), British tennis player
- Phil Edmund (1914–1993), American trumpeter and bandleader

== Other uses ==
- Edmund Scientific Corporation, an American company supplying optics and other scientific items

== See also ==
- Edmundites
- Edmond (disambiguation)
- Edmunds (disambiguation)
