= Herbert Weston Edmunds =

Herbert Weston Edmunds (1881 – 27 September 1954) was a British marine insurance underwriter and philatelist. Edmunds was president of the Royal Philatelic Society London from 1950 to 1953.

Edmunds was educated at Highgate School and the University of Cambridge. He was a member of Lloyd's of London for more than 30 years. He joined the Royal Philatelic Society in 1931 and specialised in the philately of Hanover, Tuscany, and Oldenburg.
