= Ron Palenski =

New Zealand journalist (1945–2023)

Ronald Allan Palenski ONZM (31 March 1945 – 22 August 2023) was a New Zealand journalist and sportsman.

Palenski was born in Dunedin on 31 March 1945. He started as a journalist with The Evening Star in Dunedin and went on to work with the New Zealand Press Association and The Dominion. He established the New Zealand Sports Hall of Fame and administered it from 1998 until illness forced his retirement not long before he died.

In the 2003 New Year Honours, Palenski was appointed an Officer of the New Zealand Order of Merit, for services to sports journalism. In November 2022, he was inducted into the New Zealand Sports Hall of Fame. He wrote approximately 50 books, most of them on sport, but some also on New Zealand history.

Palenski died of cancer on 22 August 2023, at the age of 78.

== Selected publications ==
=== Rugby ===
- Graham Mourie, Captain: An Autobiography (1982; written with Graham Mourie)
- Loveridge, Master Halfback (1985)
- Lochore: An Authorised Biography (1996; written with Alex Veysey and Gary Caffell)
- New Zealand Rugby: Stories of Heroism & Valour (2002)
- All Blacks: The Authorised Portrait (2007; edited)
- Touchlines: An Anthology of Rugby Poetry (2013, edited)
- The New Invincibles: How the 2013 All Blacks Created History (2013)
- The ALL BLACKography (2014)
- Rugby: A New Zealand History (2015)
- 1875: When Rugby Became the Game for All New Zealand (2017)
- Murdoch: The All Black Who Never Returned (2018)
- Our Game: New Zealand Rugby at 150 (2020)
- Brutal: The 100-Year Fight for World Rugby Supremacy (2021)

=== Other sports ===
- Bat & Pad: An Anthology of Writings on New Zealand Cricket (1987; edited)
- Champions: New Zealand Sports Greats of the 20th Century (2000; written with Joseph Romanos)
- Black Gold: 100 Years of New Zealand at the Olympic Games: A Statistical Record (2008)
- Champion: New Zealand's First Olympic Winner (2013)
- c Tindill b Cowie: The Story of Bradman and New Zealand (2013)
- Joe Scott: The Amazing Story of New Zealand's First World Champion (2018)

=== Other subjects ===
- Kiwi Milestones: New Zealand's Population through the Millions (2002)
- How We Saw the War: 1939–45 through New Zealand Eyes (2009)
- On This Day in New Zealand (2010)
- Kiwi Battlefields (2011)
- The Making of New Zealanders (2012)
- Men of Valour: New Zealand and the Battle for Crete (2013)
- The Star of the South: A History of the Evening Star Newspaper (2019)
