= Richard Edmunds (cricketer) =

English cricketer

Personal information
- Full name: Richard Harold Edmunds
- Born: 27 May 1970; Oakham, Rutland, England
- Died: 10 December 1989 (aged 19); Leicester, England
- Batting: Right-handed
- Bowling: Left arm medium-fast
- Role: Bowler

Domestic team information
- Years: Team
- 1989: Leicestershire

Career statistics
Competition	First-class	List A
Matches	2	3
Runs scored	17	14
Batting average	5.66	7.00
100s/50s	0/0	0/0
Top score	17	9
Balls bowled	222	132
Wickets	3	2
Bowling average	37.66	59.00
5 wickets in innings	0	0
10 wickets in match	0	0
Best bowling	2/38	2/27
Catches/stumpings	0/–	0/–
- Source: Cricinfo, 15 August 2022

Richard Harold Edmunds (27 May 1970 – 10 December 1989) was an English cricketer. He was a right-handed batsman and a left-arm medium-fast bowler who played for Leicestershire. He was born in Oakham and died in Leicester.

Edmunds made two first-class appearances during the 1989 season for the team, making a duck in his debut innings but scoring 17 in the second, against Gloucestershire. He also took two wickets during the match. Edmunds' second and final match was less impressive, as he was trapped leg before wicket off the bowling of Chris Cowdrey for a duck in the only innings in which he batted.

Edmunds also made three List A appearances for the team during the season. Edmunds played in two Youth Test matches for England Young Cricketers against New Zealand in the summer of 1989, and three Youth One-Day Internationals during the same tour.

Edmunds died in 1989 aged 19, as a result of injuries received in a car crash near his home in Oakham on 22 November.
