= Edmund P. Murray =

American journalist

- Born: July 1930; New York City, U.S.
- Died: October 2007 (aged 77); Newark, New Jersey, U.S.
- Occupation: Author
- Website: www.maryroach.com

Edmund P. Murray (July 1930 – October 2007) was an American novelist and journalist. His novels include The Passion Players, Kulubi, My Bridge To America, and The Peregrine Spy.

Edmund Murray was a media adviser to the Iranian military during the Islamic Revolution (1978–79) when the Shah fell and Ayatollah Khomeini came to power. He worked as a journalist and a contract CIA agent in the United States and many parts of Africa, Europe, and the Middle East. Mr. Murray's short story "His Cuban Situation" published in the literary magazine Contact, won the William Carlos Williams Award.
