= Edmonds (brand) =

New Zealand baking brand

- Current owner: Goodman Fielder
- Country: New Zealand
- Introduced: 1879
- Website: edmondscooking.co.nz

Edmonds is a New Zealand brand of baking products and creator of the Edmonds Cookery Book. It was founded in 1879 as a baking powder manufacturer by grocer Thomas Edmonds after hearing his customers complain about the available baking powder not always rising properly. He created his own formula and told his customers that his baking powder was "sure to rise", which later became a slogan of the brand. Edmonds later became part of Goodman Fielder. The Edmonds Cookery Book was first published in 1908 with the name Sure To Rise Cookery Book. Since then, it has become New Zealand's best-selling book, and has been described as a New Zealand icon. The book uses staple foods as ingredients.

== History ==
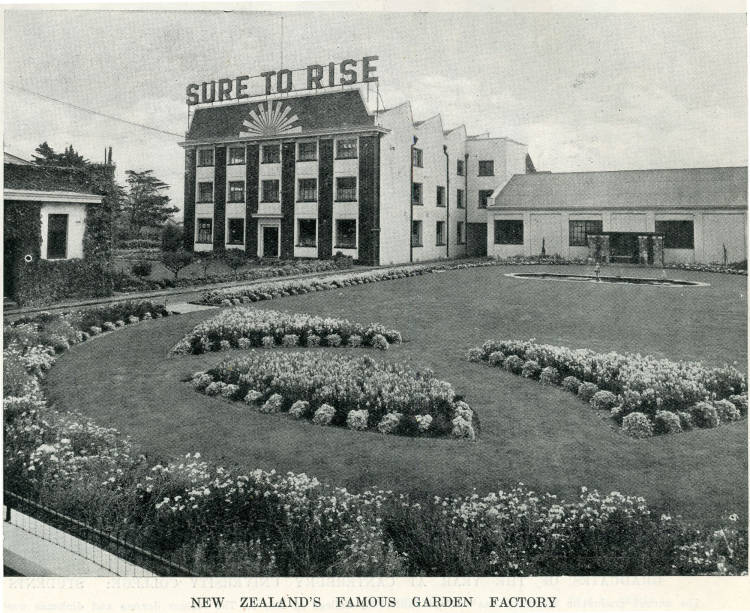
The Edmonds factory and garden, 1936

Edmonds was started in 1879 by grocer Thomas Edmonds after hearing his customers complain about the available baking powder being unreliable. Edmonds spent three years creating his own formula, while his wife managed the shop. He sold 200 tins in his first batch, and told his customers that their baked goods were "sure to rise", which turned into the brand's slogan. He travelled around Canterbury marketing his baking powder to households. If the occupants refused to buy the baking powder, he would give them a tin for free and would take it back if they were unsatisfied. Edmonds recalled in 1922 that no tins were ever returned.

The Edmonds family moved to a house in the early 1890s on the corner of Aldwins and Ferry road in Christchurch. There, Edmonds increased the scale of production by building sheds. This site later turned into the three-storey factory with the "Sure to Rise" sign in 1892, featuring gardens and later making its way onto the cover of the Edmonds Cookery Book.

In 1912, the millionth tin was sold, and by 1929, when the country's population was 1.5 million, Edmonds was selling three million tins a year. The leftover tins were recycled to build a few roads in Christchurch. During World War II, the Home Guard encouraged housewives to hoard the tins, so they could be used in jam tin grenade bombs in case the Empire of Japan invaded.

After the head office and manufacturing moved to Auckland in the 1980s and the Ferry Road factory was abandoned, it was controversially demolished in 1990, and the Christchurch City Council bought part of the gardens next year. An oval garden and a rose garden was later added. Brierley Investments bought Edmonds in 1984, and as of 2023 Edmonds is owned by Goodman Fielder.

Edmonds Street, next to the location of the old factory, had incorrectly been spelt "Edmond St" from 1893 until the community board renamed it to "Edmonds St" in 2018. It was originally named "Edmonds St" and it is not known why the 's' disappeared.

Edmonds products include baking powder, cake mixes, flours, yeast, baking soda and custard powder. They previously sold jelly crystals, which had the slogan "sure to set", egg powder and a pastry range that was discontinued in 2023.

== Edmonds Cookery Book ==
The third edition of the cookery book, published in 1914

The Edmonds Cookery Book is a recipe book made by Edmonds, that features simple recipes using staples and affordable ingredients. The 2012 edition has over 500 recipes.

With over three million copies sold by 2015, it is the best-selling New Zealand published book as of 2019, and has been described by Ron Palenski as "much a part of New Zealand kitchens as a stove and knife". It has also been called a New Zealand icon, Kiwiana, and has appeared on a 2008 stamp series featuring national icons for each letter of the alphabet.

Before the cookery book was created, Edmonds put recipes in the lids of the baking powder tins. The book was first published in 1908, originally named the Sure To Rise Cookery Book with 50 pages. In 1930 the first edition with photos was released, and since 1955, the 'sure to rise' factory has been on the cover. The 1971 book was dedicated to gas cooking, and a microwave baking section was added in 1988.

Originally, housewives could write a request to Edmonds to get a free copy. Couples in the 1940s who announced that they had become engaged in the newspaper would receive a free cookbook. Since 1955 it has been a paid product.

== Factory Gardens ==
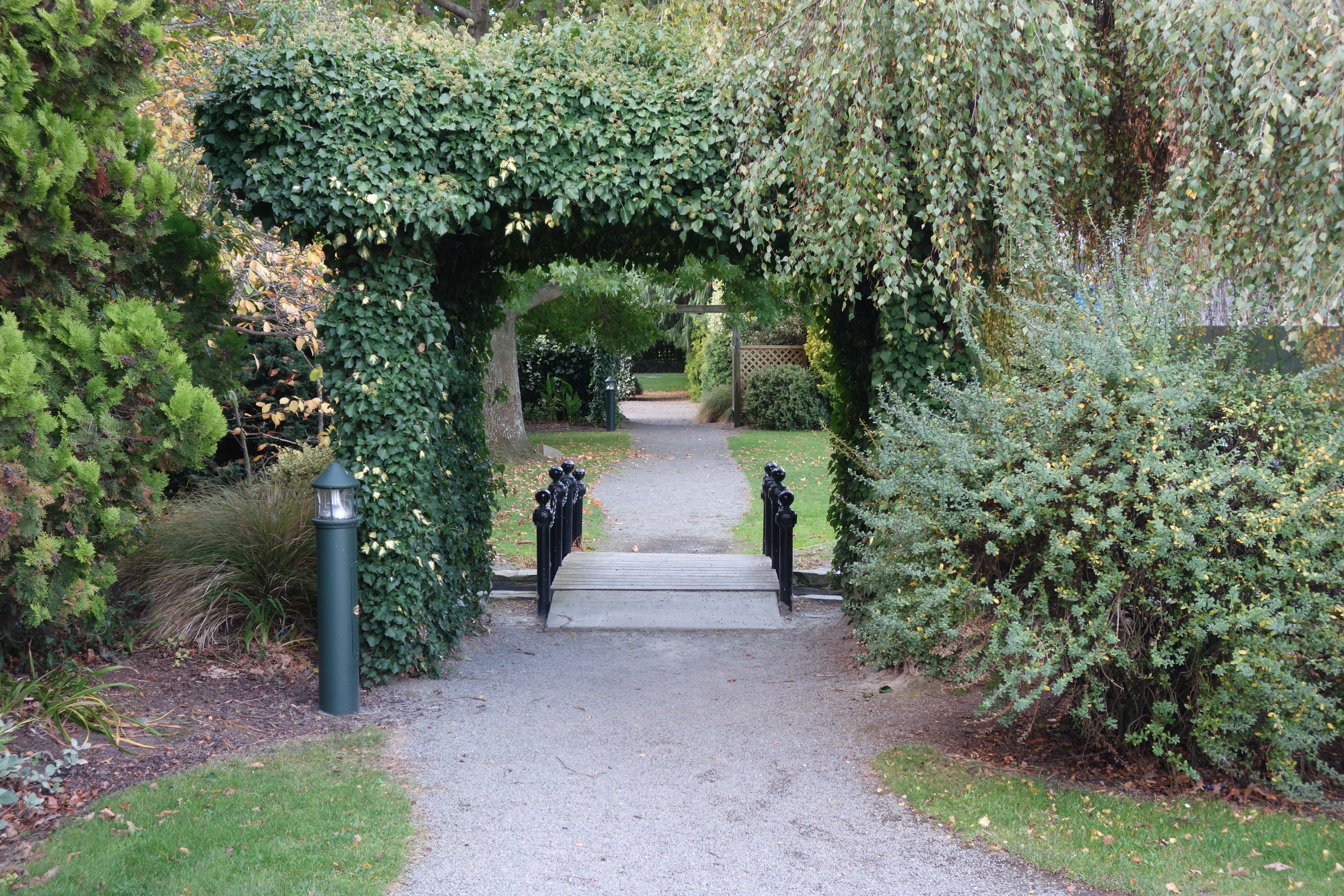
Edmonds Factory Gardens, 2016

The gardens were originally designed in 1923 with an Edwardian style by a factory worker, as part of the garden city movement. A garden was designed in front of the factory in 1935 by Edgar Taylor, with a neoclassical style. A bowling green and kindergarten was later added. Since about 1940 there has been a lily pond and a bed of French marigolds in the form of sunrays in the Edmonds logo. A pond and creek was added from 1977 to 1982. The gardens in front of the factory were removed in the demolition, but the western gardens were preserved after being bought by the city council. There is a memorial rose garden to the daughter of Edmonds, Irene Ballantyne. It is often used as a wedding venue. The gardens are maintained by the local group Friends of the Gardens.
