= Richard Edmonds (scientist) =

British scientist

- Born: 18 September 1801; Penzance, Cornwall, England, United Kingdom
- Died: 12 March 1886 (aged 84); Plymouth, England
- Citizenship: British
- Scientific career
- Fields: Geology, Archaeology
- Workplaces: RGSC, RIC

Richard Edmonds (18 September 1801 – 12 March 1886) was a British scientific writer of the Victorian period.

== Life and career ==
Edmonds, the eldest son of Richard Edmonds (town clerk and solicitor of Penzance), was born on 18 September 1801. He was educated in the grammar schools at Penzance and Helston. Articled as an attorney with his father in 1818, he qualified in 1823. He practised in Penzance until 1825 when he moved to Redruth, returning to Penzance in 1836.

He had some poetical tastes, afterwards manifested in forty-four hymns contributed to a volume of 'Hymns for Festivals of the Church' (1857). In 1828 he contributed to the 'Cornish Magazine.'

Edmonds joined the Royal Geological Society of Cornwall in 1814, and made geological observations for the Society in Mount's Bay, especially on the sandbanks between Penzance and Marazion and the submerged forests of that shore. In 1843 the Penzance Natural History and Antiquarian Society was established. It began to publish in 1846, and communications from Edmonds were revised and collected in a volume entitled ‘The Land's End District: its Antiquities, Natural History, Natural Phenomena, and Scenery’ (1862). In 1832 Edmonds sent papers 'On Meteors observed in Cornwall' and 'On the Ancient Church discovered in Perranzabuloe' to the Literary Gazette and the London and Edinburgh Philosophical Magazine, and subsequently from time to time he contributed to these journals on antiquarian and geological subjects. Edmonds was corresponding secretary for Cornwall of the Cambrian Archaeological Society. He became a diligent inquirer after the evidences of Phœnician commerce, of Roman rule, and Celtic possession in the western peninsula of Cornwall. He collected many interesting facts, but was wanting in the critical faculty necessary for useful investigation.

On 5 July 1843 a remarkable disturbance of the sea was observed in Mount's Bay. Edmonds recorded with much care the phenomena as observed by him at Penzance. He collected accounts of analogous phenomena on the Cornish coast, and in subsequent years several examples of similar alternate ebbings and flowings of the sea were recorded by Edmonds and others, and rather hastily attributed by him to submarine earthquakes. Edmonds thus gained the title of a seismologist, to which he certainly can make no claim. He was singularly modest and timid, even to the point of confusion in stating his views. Notwithstanding this he collected with much labour all the remarkable facts connected with earthquakes, and induces his readers to believe that he traces some connection between the abnormal tides of the Atlantic and the small earthquake shocks sometimes felt in Cornwall. He had never received any scientific training, and failed to attribute the oscillations to their true cause, the formation of a vast tide wave in mid ocean, probably due to astronomical influences.

He wrote about twelve papers on the Celtic remains of Cornwall, upon Roman antiquities, and ancient customs. His papers on the agitations of the sea were sent to the Royal Irish Academy, to the British Association, the ‘Gentleman's Magazine,’ the ‘Philosophical Magazine,’ as well as to the journals published by the Royal Cornwall Geological Society and to the Royal Institution of Cornwall.

Edmonds left Cornwall shortly after 1870, and died in 1886.
