= Edmondston =

Edmondston may refer to:

- Arthur Edmondston (1776–1841), Scottish writer and doctor
- Catherine Devereux Edmondston (1823–1875), American diarist
- Laurence Edmondston (1795–1879), British-born naturalist and doctor, brother of Arthur
- Thomas Edmondston (1825–1846), British-born botanist, son of Laurence
