= Al Fahidi Fort (horse race) =

- Class: Group Two
- Location: Meydan Racecourse; Dubai, United Arab Emirates
- Inaugurated: 2003
- Race type: Thoroughbred - Flat racing

Race information
- Distance: 1,400 metres
- Surface: Turf
- Track: Left-handed
- Purse: $250,000

The Al Fahidi Fort is a horse race run over a distance of 1,400 metres (seven furlongs) on turf in January at Meydan Racecourse in Dubai. The race is named after the oldest existing building in Dubai.

It was first run in 2003 Nad Al Sheba Racecourse before being transferred to Meydan in 2010.

The race distance was 1600 metres until 2014 it was reduced to 1400 metres.

The race began as a Listed race in 2003. The race was elevated to Group 3 level in 2004 and became a Group 2 event in 2006.

== Records ==
Record time:

- 1:21.59 - Al Suhail (2023) (1400 metres)
- 1:35.97 - D'Anjou (2004) (1600 metres)

Most successful horse (2 wins):

- Linngari – 2006, 2007
- Safety Check – 2015, 2016

Most wins by a jockey:

- 5 - Kevin Shea 2003, 2006, 2007, 2008, 2012

Most wins by a trainer:

- 8 - Charlie Appleby 2015, 2016, 2018, 2019, 2020, 2022, 2023, 2024

Most wins by an owner:

- 8 - Godolphin Racing 2015, 2016, 2018, 2019, 2021, 2022, 2023, 2024

== Winners ==
Year	Winner	Age	Jockey	Trainer	Owner	Time
2003	Ipi Tombe	4	Kevin Shea	Mike de Kock	Team Valor, Winstar Farm & Sunmark Partners	1:37.00
2004	D'Anjou	7	Mick Kinane	John Oxx	Barouche Stud	1:35.97
2005	Yard-Arm	5	Weichong Marwing	Mike de Kock	Lammerskraal Stud	1:36.38
2006	Linngari	4	Kevin Shea	Herman Brown	James Atkinson & Peter Walichnowski	1:40.20
2007	Linngari	5	Kevin Shea	Herman Brown	James Atkinson & Peter Walichnowski	1:38.45
2008	Archipenko	4	Kevin Shea	Mike de Kock	Mohammed Khalifa Al Maktoum	1:39:31
2009	Gladiatorus	4	Royston Ffrench	Mubarak bin Shafya	Mansoor bin Mohammed al Maktoum	1:36.67
2010	Bankable	4	Ryan Moore	Herman Brown	Ramzan Kadyrov	1:38.50
2011	Derbaas	5	Richard Hills	Ali Rashid Al Raihe	Hamdan Al Maktoum	1:37.82
2012	Viscount Nelson	5	Kevin Shea	Mike de Kock	Partridge, De Kock, Haynes et al.	1:38.13
2013	Mushreq	4	Paul Hanagan	Mike de Kock	Hamdan Al Maktoum	1:36.60
2014	Anaerobio	6	Christophe Soumillon	Mike de Kock	Mohammed Khaleel Ahmed	1:23.36
2015	Safety Check	4	William Buick	Charlie Appleby	Godolphin	1:23.09
2016	Safety Check	5	William Buick	Charlie Appleby	Godolphin	1:22.77
2017	Championship	5	Colm O'Donoghue	Ahmed Bin Harmash	Mansoor bin Mohammed al Maktoum	1:22.82
2018	Jungle Cat	6	James Doyle	Charlie Appleby	Godolphin	1:22.40
2019	D'bai	5	James Doyle	Charlie Appleby	Godolphin	1:23.40
2020	Glorious Journey	5	James Doyle	Charlie Appleby	HH Sheikha Al Jalila Racing	1:22.35
2021	Land Of Legends	5	Frankie Dettori	Saeed bin Suroor	Godolphin	1:22.55
2022	Naval Crown	4	William Buick	Charlie Appleby	Godolphin	1:22.02
2023	Al Suhail	6	James Doyle	Charlie Appleby	Godolphin	1:21.59
2024	Mysterious Night	4	William Buick	Charlie Appleby	Godolphin	1:21.73
2025	Marbaan	5	James McDonald	Michael Costa	Sheikh Ahmed Al Maktoum	1:21.04
2026	Elnajmm	6	Andrew Slattery	Michael Costa	Sheikh Ahmed Al Maktoum	1:22.57

== See also ==
- List of United Arab Emirates horse races
