= Jebel Hatta =

Horse race in the United Arab Emirates

- Class: Group 1
- Location: Meydan Racecourse; Dubai, United Arab Emirates
- Inaugurated: 2000
- Race type: Thoroughbred - Flat racing
- Website: Emirates Racing Association

Race information
- Distance: 1800 meters (app. 1 1/8 miles)
- Surface: Turf
- Track: Left-handed
- Qualification: NH bred Four-Year-Olds & up & SH bred Three-Year-Olds & up
- Weight: SH bred 3YO : 55kg. NH & SH bred 4YO+ : 59kg
- Purse: US$300,000

The Jebel Hatta is a Thoroughbred horse race run annually since 2000 at the Meydan Racecourse in Dubai, United Arab Emirates. Raced on turf, it is open to horses four-years-old and up who were bred in the Northern Hemisphere and to horses three-years-old and up who were bred in the Southern Hemisphere.

Inaugurated in 2000, it was run that year at a distance of 1700 meters. Since 2001 it has been raced over a distance of 1777 meters (app. 1.1 miles). Start from 2012, the race updated to Group One, become first two (within Al Maktoum Challenge, Round 3) UAE Group one races outside than Dubai World Cup Night.

== Records ==
Time record:

- 1:45:10 - Romantic Warrior 2025

Most wins by a horse:

- 2 - Alfareeq 2022, 2023

Most wins by an owner:

- 10 - Godolphin 2002, 2009, 2013, 2015, 2016, 2018, 2019, 2020, 2024, 2026

Most wins by a jockey:

- 5 - William Buick 2013, 2016, 2020, 2024, 2026

Most wins by a trainer:

- 6 - Saeed bin Suroor 2000, 2001, 2002, 2013, 2015, 2019

== Winners of the Jebel Hatta ==
Year	Winner	Age	Jockey	Trainer	Owner	Time
2000	Siege	4	Frankie Dettori	Saeed bin Suroor	Hamdan Al Maktoum	1:44.40
2001	Mahfooth	4	Frankie Dettori	Saeed bin Suroor	Hamdan Al Maktoum	1:50.46
2002	Divine Task	4	Jamie Spencer	Saeed bin Suroor	Godolphin	1:52.02
2003	Ipi Tombe	5	Kevin Shea	Mike de Kock	Team Valor et al.	1:48.62
2004	Surveyor	5	Weichong Marwing	Mike de Kock	P T Dimakogiannis	1:47.69
2005	Alkaadhem	5	Richard Hills	Marcus Tregoning	Hamdan Al Maktoum	1:48.99
2006	Touch of Land	6	Christophe Lemaire	Henri-Alex Pantall	Gary A. Tanaka	1:52.05
2007	Seihali	7	John Murtagh	Dhruba Selvaratnam	Ahmed bin Rashid Al Maktoum	1:49.85
2008	Lord Admiral	7	Michael Kinane	Charles O'Brien	Vincent O'Brien	1:49.32
2009	Balius	6	William Supple	Abdullah bin Huzaim	Godolphin	1:48.84
2010	Presvis	6	Ryan Moore	Luca Cumani	Leonidas Marinopoulos	1:52.93
2011	Wigmore Hall	4	Jamie Spencer	Michael Bell	M B Hawtin	1:50.66
2012	Master of Hounds	4	Kevin Shea	Michael De Kock	Mohammed bin Khalifa Al Maktoum	1:51.96
2013	Sajjhaa	6	William Buick	Saeed bin Suroor	Godolphin	1:48.96
2014	Vercingetorix	5	Christophe Soumillon	Mike de Kock	Mohammed bin Khalifa Al Maktoum	1:49.26
2015	Hunter's Light	7	James Doyle	Saeed bin Suroor	Godolphin	1:47.97
2016	Tryster	5	William Buick	Charlie Appleby	Godolphin	1:48.71
2017	Decorated Knight	5	Andrea Atzeni	Roger Charlton	Saleh Al Homaizi & Imad Al Sagar	1:49.95
2018	Blair House	5	James Doyle	Charlie Appleby	Godolphin	1:47.53
2019	Dream Castle	5	Christophe Soumillon	Saeed bin Suroor	Godolphin	1:48.17
2020	Barney Roy	6	William Buick	Charlie Appleby	Godolphin	1:46.09
2021	Lord Glitters	8	Daniel Tudhope	David O'Meara	Geoff & Sandra Turnbull	1:48.44
2022	Alfareeq	5	Dane O'Neill	Musabeh Al Mheiri	Shadwell Stable	1:48.89
2023	Alfareeq	5	Dane O'Neill	Musabeh Al Mheiri	Shadwell Stable	1:48.19
2024	Measured Time	4	William Buick	Charlie Appleby	Godolphin	1:47.89
2025	Romantic Warrior	7	James McDonald	Danny Shum Chap-shing	Peter Lau Pak-fai	1:45.10
2026	Opera Ballo	4	William Buick	Charlie Appleby	Godolphin	1:47.64

== See also ==
- List of United Arab Emirates horse races
