= Dubai City of Gold =

- Class: Group 2
- Location: Nad Al Sheba Racecourse; Dubai, United Arab Emirates
- Inaugurated: 1998
- Race type: Thoroughbred - Flat racing
- Website: Emirates Racing Association

Race information
- Distance: 2400 meters (app. 1 1/2 miles) (12 Furlongs)
- Surface: Turf
- Track: Left-handed
- Qualification: NH & SH bred Four-Years-Old+
- Weight: NH bred 4YO: 55.5 kg NH bred 5YO+ 56 kg SH bred 4YO+ : 56 kg
- Purse: US$250,000

The Dubai City of Gold is a Thoroughbred horse race run annually since 1998 at Nad Al Sheba Racecourse in Dubai, United Arab Emirates. Given the nickname for the city of Dubai, the Group 2 race is open to Northern and Southern Hemisphere bred horses age four years and up. It is raced on turf at a distance of 2400 metres (app. 1 1/2 miles).

Initially a conditions race, it was upgraded to Group 3 status in 2001 and then to Group 2 status in 2009.

== Records ==
Time record:

- 2:26.83 - Walton Street 2021

Most wins by an owner:

- 16 - Godolphin 2001, 2002, 2003, 2010, 2011, 2014, 2015, 2017, 2018, 2019, 2020, 2021, 2023, 2024, 2025, 2026

Most wins by a jockey:

- 6 - Frankie Dettori 1998, 1999, 2000, 2001, 2003, 2010
- 6 - William Buick 2018, 2019, 2021, 2023, 2025, 2026

Most wins by a trainer:

- 10 - Saeed bin Suroor 1998, 1999, 2000, 2001, 2002, 2003, 2010, 2014, 2015, 2017

== Winners of the Dubai City of Gold ==
Year	Winner	Age	Jockey	Trainer	Owner	Time
1998	Happy Valentine	4	Frankie Dettori	Saeed bin Suroor	Maktoum Al Maktoum	2:36:97
1999	Sibling Rival	5	Frankie Dettori	Saeed bin Suroor	Sheikh Mohammed	2:28:91
2000	High-Rise	5	Frankie Dettori	Saeed bin Suroor	Mohammed Obaid Al Maktoum	2:29:30
2001	Give The Slip	4	Frankie Dettori	Saeed bin Suroor	Godolphin Racing	2:30.71
2002	Narrative	4	Richard Hills	Saeed bin Suroor	Godolphin Racing	2:32.63
2003	Highest	4	Frankie Dettori	Saeed bin Suroor	Godolphin Racing	2:30.15
2004	Fair Mix	4	Olivier Peslier	Marcel Rolland	Ecurie Week-End	2:29.24
2005	Greys Inn	5	Weichong Marwing	Mike de Kock	Bridget D. Oppenheimer	2:30:18
2006	Oracle West	5	Kevin Shea	Mike de Kock	Kenny Geemooi	2:33.89
2007	Quijano	5	Andrasch Starke	Peter Schiergen	Gestüt Fährhof	2:33.07
2008	Gower Song	5	Richard Hills	David Elsworth	Usk Valley Stud	2:30.10
2009	Front House	4	Kevin Shea	Mike de Kock	Sue Magnier & Wilgerbodsdrift Stud	2:31.70
2010	Campanologist	5	Frankie Dettori	Saeed Bin Suroor	Godolphin Racing	2:37.36
2011	Monterosso	4	Mickael Barzalona	Mahmood Al Zarooni	Godolphin Racing	2:36.09
2012	Mikhail Glinka	5	Royston Ffrench	Herman Brown	Ramzan Kadyrov	2:33.68
2013	Jakkalberry	7	Ryan Moore	Marco Botti	Jakkalberry Syndicate et al.	2:35.36
2014	Excellent Result	4	Kieren Fallon	Saeed bin Suroor	Godolphin Racing	2:32.87
2015	Sky Hunter	5	James Doyle	Saeed bin Suroor	Godolphin Racing	2:32.88
2016	Postponed	5	Andrea Atzeni	Roger Varian	Mohammed Obaid Al Maktoum	2:27.90
2017	Prize Money	4	Adrie de Vries	Saeed bin Suroor	Godolphin Racing	2:29.33
2018	Hawkbill	5	William Buick	Charlie Appleby	Godolphin Racing	2:26.85
2019	Old Persian	4	William Buick	Charlie Appleby	Godolphin Racing	2:32.68
2020	Loxley	5	Mickael Barzalona	Charlie Appleby	Godolphin Racing	2:28.59
2021	Walton Street	7	William Buick	Charlie Appleby	Godolphin Racing	2:26.83
2022	Hukum	5	Jim Crowley	Owen Burrows	Shadwell Stable	2:28.56
2023	Global Storm	6	William Buick	Charlie Appleby	Godolphin	2:27.47
2024	Bold Act	4	Mickael Barzalona	Charlie Appleby	Godolphin	2:26.03
2025	Silver Knott	5	William Buick	Charlie Appleby	Godolphin	2:30.63
2026	Rebel's Romance	8	William Buick	Charlie Appleby	Godolphin	2:28.73

== See also ==
- List of United Arab Emirates horse races
