= Al Bahathri =

American-bred Thoroughbred racehorse

- Racing silks of Hamdan Al Maktoum
- Sire: Blushing Groom
- Grandsire: Red God
- Dam: Chain Store
- Damsire: Nodouble
- Sex: Filly
- Foaled: 15 March 1982
- Country: USA
- Colour: Chestnut
- Breeder: Thomas P. Whitney
- Owner: Hamdan Al Maktoum
- Trainer: Harry Thomson Jones
- Record: 12: 6-2-1

Major wins
- Princess Margaret Stakes (1984); Lowther Stakes (1984); Irish 1,000 Guineas (1985); Coronation Stakes (1985); Child Stakes (1985)

Awards
- Timeform rating 114 (1984), 123 (1985)

Al Bahathri (15 March 1982 – 7 May 2014) was an American-bred, British-trained Thoroughbred racehorse and broodmare. As a two-year-old she was one of the best of her generation in Europe, winning three of her five races including the Princess Margaret Stakes and the Lowther Stakes. In the following year, 1985, she was narrowly beaten in the 1000 Guineas before winning the Irish 1,000 Guineas, Coronation Stakes and Child Stakes. After her retirement from racing she became a very successful and influential broodmare, whose descendants included Haafhd, Military Attack, Gladiatorus and Red Cadeaux. She died in 2014 at the age of thirty-two.

== Background ==
Al Bahathri was a chestnut mare with a white blaze, three white feet and a long white sock on her left hind leg bred in Kentucky by Thomas P. Whitney. She was from the fifth crop of foals sired by the French-bred stallion Blushing Groom who sired numerous other major winners including Rainbow Quest, Nashwan and Arazi. Al Bahathri's dam Chain Store, was a successful racemare who won eight races before being retired to the breeding shed, where she also produced the Diana Handicap winner Geraldine's Store. Chain Store was a full sister to Double Discount, a gelding who set a world record time of 1:57.4 for ten furlongs on turf when winning the Carleton F. Burke Handicap in 1977. Al Bahathri was described as a "well-made filly... a good mover with a fine long stride".

As a yearling, the filly was sent to the Keeneland July Sale where she was bought for $650,000 by representatives of Hamdan Al Maktoum. The filly was sent to Europe where she was trained by Harry Thomson "Tom" Jones at his Woodland stable in Newmarket, Suffolk. She was ridden in most of her races by Tony Murray and usually raced in a sheepskin noseband. Her name is Arabic for lavender.

== Racing career ==
=== 1984: two-year-old season ===
In June 1984, Al Bahathri made her debut in a six furlong contest for previously unraced fillies at Ascot Racecourse in which she ran well for half a mile before finishing fifth of the eleven runners behind Silver Dollar and Graecia Magna. On her next appearance, the filly contested a nineteen-runner maiden race over the same distance at Newmarket Racecourse in July. She led soon after the start and went clear of her opponents in the closing stages to win by three lengths from the Barry Hills-trained Only. Later that month, Al Bahathri was then moved up in class for the Princess Margaret Stakes (now a Group Three) at Ascot. Starting at odds of 5/1, she took the lead at half way and won by a length from Graecia Magna, with Fatah Flare (later to win the Musidora Stakes) and Silver Dollar in third and fourth. According to Timeform, she displayed "great determination despite drifting right" in the closing stages.

At York Racecourse in August, Al Bahathri was again stepped up in class for the Group Two Lowther Stakes at York and started the 11/10 favourite. After disputing the lead for most of the way she accelerated away from the field in the last two furlongs to win by four lengths from Imperial Jade, despite being eased down by Murray near the finish. On her final appearance of the season at Newmarket in October, Al Bahathri started favourite for the Cheveley Park Stakes, then the only Group One race in Britain confined to two-year-old fillies. Her main rival appeared to be Park Appeal, who had easily beaten Only in the Moyglare Stud Stakes and the French-trained Gallanta, winner of the Prix de Cabourg, and runner-up in the Prix Morny. The field split into two group across the wide Newmarket straight, with the favourite dominating the group in the centre, but racing behind the group on the far side (the right side from the jockeys' viewpoint). Al Bahathri appeared to be struggling two furlongs out, and despite staying on in the closing stages she finished third behind Park Appeal and Polly Daniels, both of whom had been among the far side group.

=== 1985: three-year-old season ===
On her three-year-old debut, Al Bahathri was beaten a neck by the Michael Stoute-trained Top Socialite in the Fred Darling Stakes over seven furlongs at Newbury Racecourse in April after being restrained in the early stages. In her subsequent races, she was usually allowed to run from the front. In the 1000 Guineas at Newmarket on 2 May, the filly started at odds of 11/1 in a field which included Oh So Sharp and Triptych as well as the Phoenix Stakes winner Aviance, the Prix Imprudence winner Vilikaia, the 1000 Guineas Trial Stakes winner Dafayna and the Waterford Candelabra Stakes winner Bella Colora. She did not look impressive before the race, with Timeform commenting that he appeared to have "gone backwards" since her two-year-old campaign. Murray settled the filly in third place in the early stages before moving up to dispute the lead with Bella Colora. The two fillies engaged in a prolonged struggle throughout the last half mile before Al Bahathri gained a narrow advantage inside the final furlong, at which point Oh So Shap and Vilikaia began to make rapid progress on the outside. In a three way photo finish, Al Bahathri was beaten a short head by Oh So Sharp, with Bella Colora a short head away in third and Vilikaia three quarters of a length further back in fourth. Three weeks later, Al Bahathri was sent to Ireland to contest the Irish 1,000 Guineas at the Curragh in which she raced on soft ground for the first time. She started the 7/1 third favourite behind Triptych, who had defeated male opposition in the Irish 2,000 Guineas a week earlier, and Vilikaia, whilst her other opponents included Aviance, Dafayna and Top Socialite, who had finished second in the Poule d'Essai des Pouliches since beating Al Bahathri at Newbury. Murray sent the filly to the front soon after the start and maintained her advantage into the straight, where she faced challenges from Vilikaia, Top Socialite, Triptych and Dafayna. Vilikaia briefly looked likely to take the victory, but Al Bahathri rallied in the closing stages to win by three quarters of a length, with Top Socialite a short head away in third.

At Royal Ascot on 19 June, Al Bahathri started the 4/6 favourite for the Coronation Stakes (then a Group Two race) despite being required to concede four pounds to Top Socialite and five other fillies. The favourite took the lead from the start and opened up a clear advantage entering the straight even after stumbling on the final turn. She held on in the closing stages to win by a length from Top Socialite, with the Queen's filly Soprano in third ahead of Ever Genial. Al Bahathri was matched against older fillies and mares for the first time in the Child Stakes (then a Group Three race) over one mile at Newmarket on 10 July. She started the 6/5 favourite ahead of a field which included the three-year-olds Bella Colora, Ever Genial, Fatah Flare and Zaizafon (Seaton Delaval Stakes) and the four-year-olds Free Guest (Sun Chariot Stakes) and Brocade (Challenge Stakes). Murray, who was riding with a shoulder injury, sent the favourite into the lead soon after the start and the filly held on in the straight to win by a neck from Ever Genial with Bella Colora a neck away in third ahead of Zaizafon and the French-trained Northern Aspen. After three consecutive wins over one mile, the filly was moved up in distance to contest the Nassau Stakes (then a Group Two race) over ten furlongs at Goodwood Racecourse on 3 August. She started 6/5 favourite but tired badly in the last quarter mile on soft ground and finished seventh of the eleven runners behind Free Guest. Al Bahathri met Free Guest for the third time in the Sun Chariot Stakes (then a ten furlong Group Two race) at Newmarket in October. Racing on firm ground, she finished fourth of the five runners behind Free Guest, Capo di Monte and Ever Genial, beaten less than three lengths by the winner, who she was meeting on worse than weight-for-age terms.

== Assessment and honours ==
In the International Classification for 1984, Al Bahathri was rated the seventh-best two-year-old filly in Europe behind Triptych, Park Appeal, Alydar's Best, Helen Street, Seven Springs and Oh So Sharp. The independent Timeform organisation rated her on 114, eleven pounds below their best two-year-old filly Triptych. In the following year she was rated the third-best three-year-old filly over one mile behind Oh So Sharp and Lypharita. Timeform gave her a rating of 123, eight pounds behind their top-rated three-year-old filly Oh So Sharp. In their annual Racehorses of 1985, Timeform described her as "a very genuine filly, a pleasure to watch".

Hamdan Al Maktoum funded the creation of a new all-weather training track at Newmarket, named the Al Bahathri gallop in honour of his filly.

== Breeding record ==
Al Bahathri was retired from racing to become a broodmare at her owner's Derrinstown Stud. She produced at least twelve foals and seven winners between 1987 and 2005:

- Hasbah, a chesnut filly, foaled in 1987, sired by Kris. Won three races included the Listed Garnet Stakes, second in the Coronation Stakes.
- Almaaseh, bay filly, 1988, by Dancing Brave. Failed to win in two races; dam of Military Attack, grand-dam of Red Cadeaux and Big Orange
- Gmaasha, chestnut filly, 1989, by Kris. Unraced, dam of Gladiotorus (Premio Vittorio di Capua, Dubai Duty Free).
- Alyakkh, bay filly, 1990, by Sadler's Wells. Won one race, dam of Mutakarrim (Sharp Novices' Hurdle)
- Goalwah, bay filly, 1992, by Sadler's Wells. Won one race.
- Mithali, bay colt, 1993, by Unfuwain. Won three races.
- Za-Im, bay colt, 1994, by Green Desert. Won two races.
- Almurooj (GB) : Bay filly, foaled 16 April 1995, by Zafonic (USA) – placed 4th twice from 4 starts in England 1997–98
- Munir, chestnut colt, 1998, by Indian Ridge, Won two races, the Greenham Stakes and Challenge Stakes
- Haafhd, chestnut colt, 2001, by Alhaarth. Won five races including 2000 Guineas, Champion Stakes
- Mashaair, chestnut colt, 2003, by King's Best. Failed to win in six races.
- Shamtari, bay filly, 2005, by Alhaarth. Unraced.

After being retired from breeding, Al Bahathri acted as a foster mother to foals and weanlings at the Derrinstown Stud. She died in May 2014 at the advanced age (for a Thoroughbred) of thirty-two. The stud's manager, Stephen Collins said "Al Bahathri lived out her final years in retirement at Derrinstown, and, until recently, had remained healthy despite her advancing years... she passed away peacefully".

== Pedigree ==
Pedigree of Al Bahathri (USA), chestnut mare, 1982
Sire Blushing Groom (FR) 1974	Red God (USA); 1954	Nasrullah	Nearco
Sire Blushing Groom (FR) 1974	Red God (USA); 1954	Nasrullah	Mumtaz Begum
Sire Blushing Groom (FR) 1974	Red God (USA); 1954	Spring Run	Menow
Sire Blushing Groom (FR) 1974	Red God (USA); 1954	Spring Run	Boola Brook
Sire Blushing Groom (FR) 1974	Runaway Bride (GB); 1962	Wild Risk	Rialto
Sire Blushing Groom (FR) 1974	Runaway Bride (GB); 1962	Wild Risk	Wild Violet
Sire Blushing Groom (FR) 1974	Runaway Bride (GB); 1962	Aimee	Tudor Minstrel
Sire Blushing Groom (FR) 1974	Runaway Bride (GB); 1962	Aimee	Emali
Dam Chain Store (USA) 1972	Nodouble (USA); 1965	Noholme	Star Kingdom
Dam Chain Store (USA) 1972	Nodouble (USA); 1965	Noholme	Oceana
Dam Chain Store (USA) 1972	Nodouble (USA); 1965	Abla-Jay	Double Jay
Dam Chain Store (USA) 1972	Nodouble (USA); 1965	Abla-Jay	Ablamucha
Dam Chain Store (USA) 1972	General Store (USA); 1965	To Market	Market Wise
Dam Chain Store (USA) 1972	General Store (USA); 1965	To Market	Pretty Does
Dam Chain Store (USA) 1972	General Store (USA); 1965	General's Sister	Count Fleet
Dam Chain Store (USA) 1972	General Store (USA); 1965	General's Sister	Cigar Maid (Family 9-e)
