= SA Derby =

SA Derby may refer to the following horse racing events:

- South Australian Derby
- South African Derby
- Santa Anita Derby
