= Mike de Kock =

South African horse owner and trainer (born 1964)

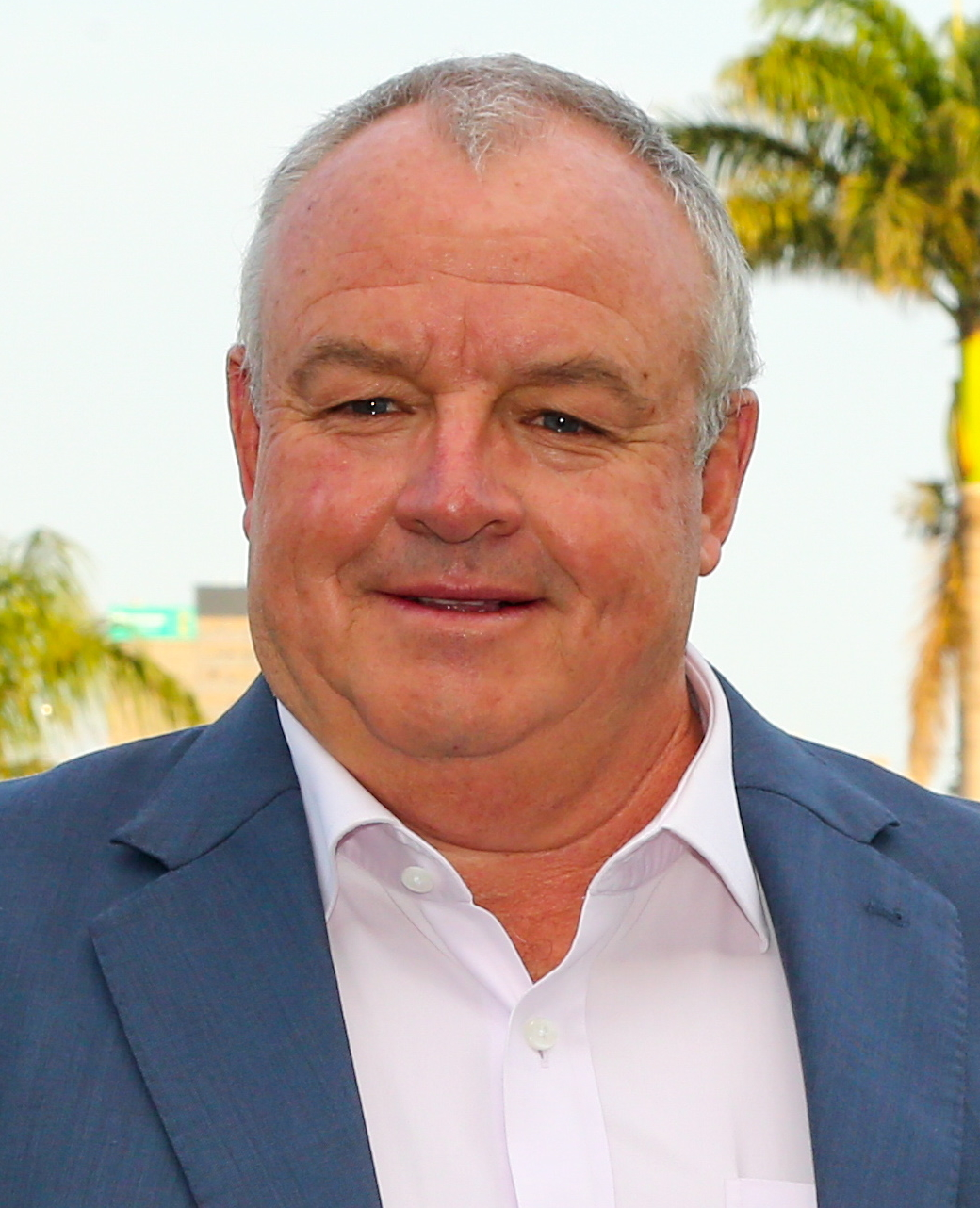

Personal information
- Born: February 14, 1964 (age 62) Alberton, South Africa
- Occupation: Trainer

Horse racing career
- Sport: Horse racing
- Career wins: 3,400+ (ongoing)

Major racing wins
- South Africa Feature Race wins: Durban July (2002, 2004, 2010, 2011, 2022); Sun Met (1999, 2000, 2012); Summer Cup (2000, 2001, 2003, 2005, 2008, 2010) South African Triple Crown Race wins: SA Classic (2004, 2009, 2017, 2019, 2021, 2024); SA Derby (1999, 2004, 2009, 2010, 2021); Gauteng Guineas (2008, 2011, 2012, 2017); Cape Guineas (1999, 2002, 2003, 2015, 2018) South African Triple Tiara Race wins: SA Fillies Classic (2005, 2010, 2011, 2017, 2018); SA Oaks (2015); Gauteng Fillies Guineas (2006, 2009, 2010, 2011, 2018, 2019); Cape Fillies Guineas (2003, 2012, 2014) International Stakes wins: Al Quoz Sprint (2013); Dubai Duty Free (2003, 2004); Jebel Hatta (2012, 2014); Sheema Classic (2008); Hong Kong Champions Mile (2014); Hong Kong Cup (2008); QEII Cup (2006, 2008) Singapore Cup (2010)

Mike de Kock (born February 14, 1964) is a South African racehorse trainer. He currently holds the South African record for most Grade 1 wins by a trainer, with 143. He has trained over 3,600 winners, who have won in South Africa, UAE, Hong Kong, Singapore, the United Kingdom and the US.

De Kock has been champion trainer eight times. He has trained 141 Grade 1 winners, 159 Grade 2 winners, and 102 Grade 3 winners.

On 1 February 2025, De Kock began officially training in partnership with his son Mathew following the latter's return to South Africa from Australia.

On 27 July 2025, de Kock was inducted into the South African Hall of Fame for his achievements and contributions to the sport of horse racing in South Africa.

== Awards ==
De Kock has been awarded Champion Trainer of South Africa at the annual Equus Awards on seven occasions.

== Grade 1 Winners ==
A list of all the Grade 1 winners trained by Mike de Kock.

De Kock holds the record for the most Grade 1 Summer Cup victories with nine wins (three of them when the race was known as the Champion Stakes).

No	Year	Race	Country	Horse	Jockey
1	1989	Administrator's Champion Stakes	(South Africa)	Evening Mist	Tobie van Booma
2	1995	Gold Challenge	(South Africa)	Record Edge	Karl Neisius
3	1997	Gosforth Park Classic	(South Africa)	Patchouli Dancer	Jeff Lloyd
4	1997	First National Bank 1600	(South Africa)	Record Edge	Karl Neisius
5	1997	Skeaping Champion Stakes	(South Africa)	Record Edge	Karl Neisius
6	1997	KZN Guineas	(South Africa)	Golden Hoard	Karl Neisius
7	1997	Premier's Champion Stakes	(South Africa)	Rarotonga Treaty	Piere Strydom
8	1998	Skeaping Champion Stakes	(South Africa)	Golden Hoard	Weichong Marwing
9	1998	Gold Challenge	(South Africa)	Golden Hoard	Weichong Marwing
10	1998	Garden Province Stakes	(South Africa)	Spook Express	Weichong Marwing
11	1998	Champion Stakes	(South Africa)	Golden Hoard	Weichong Marwing
12	1998	November Handicap	(South Africa)	Smart Money	Weichong Marwing
13	1999	Paddock Stakes	(South Africa)	Dog Wood	Weichong Marwing
14	1999	Cape Guineas	(South Africa)	Horse Chestnut	Weichong Marwing
15	1999	J&B Met	(South Africa)	Horse Chestnut	Weichong Marwing
16	1999	Cape Derby	(South Africa)	Dog Wood	Weichong Marwing
17	1999	Gosforth Park Classic	(South Africa)	Horse Chestnut	Weichong Marwing
18	1999	First National Bank 1600	(South Africa)	Smart Money	Weichong Marwing
19	1999	Skeaping Champion Stakes	(South Africa)	Fort Defiance	Weichong Marwing
20	1999	SA Derby	(South Africa)	Horse Chestnut	Weichong Marwing
21	2000	J&B Met	(South Africa)	Badger's Coast	Guillermo Figueroa
22	2000	Daily News 2000	(South Africa)	Badger's Coast	Piere Strydom
23	2000	Ipi Tombe Challenge*	(South Africa)	Kimberley Mine	Paul Devlin
24	2000	Summer Cup	(South Africa)	Delta Form	Guillermo Figueroa
25	2001	Garden Province Stakes	(South Africa)	Velvet Green	Weichong Marwing
26	2001	Champions Cup	(South Africa)	Ingleside	Kevin Shea
27	2001	Summer Cup	(South Africa)	Ingleside	Kevin Shea
28	2002	Paddock Stakes	(South Africa)	Escoleta Fitz	Kevin Shea
29	2002	Cape Guineas	(South Africa)	Flight Alert	Kevin Shea
30	2002	Gold Bowl	(South Africa)	Kelly	Weichong Marwing
31	2002	Woolavington Cup	(South Africa)	Ipi Tombe	Kevin Shea
32	2002	Vodacom Durban July	(South Africa)	Ipi Tombe	Kevin Shea
33	2002	Garden Province Stakes	(South Africa)	Escoleta Fitz	Kevin Shea
34	2003	Cape Guineas	(South Africa)	Domino Man	Kevin Shea
35	2003	Dubai Duty Free	(United Arab Emirates)	Ipi Tombe	Kevin Shea
36	2003	Summer Cup	(South Africa)	Wolf Whistle	Kevin Shea
37	2003	Cape Fillies Guineas	(South Africa)	Emerald Beauty	Kevin Shea
38	2004	Paddock Stakes	(South Africa)	Angelina	Jannie Bekker
39	2004	Dubai Duty Free	(United Arab Emirates)	Right Approach (Dead-Heat)	Weichong Marwing
40	2004	SA Classic	(South Africa)	Greys Inn	Kevin Shea
41	2004	Horse Chestnut 1600	(South Africa)	Domino Man	Weichong Marwing
42	2004	SA Derby	(South Africa)	Greys Inn	Weichong Marwing
43	2004	Vodacom Durban July	(South Africa)	Greys Inn	Anthony Delpech
44	2005	SA Fillies Classic	(South Africa)	Iridescence	Weichong Marwing
45	2005	Gold Medallion	(South Africa)	Carnadore	Weichong Marwing
46	2005	Woolavington Cup	(South Africa)	Iridescence	Weichong Marwing
47	2005	Summer Cup	(South Africa)	Ilha Da Vitoria	Weichong Marwing
48	2006	Empress Club Stakes	(South Africa)	Fair Maiden	Weichong Marwing
49	2006	Horse Chestnut 1600	(South Africa)	Ilha Da Vitoria	Kevin Shea
50	2006	QEII Cup	(Hong Kong)	Iridescence	Weichong Marwing
51	2006	Premiers Champion Stakes	(South Africa)	Kildonan	Weichong Marwing
52	2006	Champions Cup	(South Africa)	Equal Image	Weichong Marwing
53	2007	Empress Club Stakes	(South Africa)	Little Miss Magic	Weichong Marwing
54	2007	Allan Robertson Fillies Championship	(South Africa)	Rat Burana	Weichong Marwing
55	2007	Golden Horse Sprint	(South Africa)	Kildonan	Weichong Marwing
56	2007	Golden Slipper	(South Africa)	Gilded Minaret	Weichong Marwing
57	2007	Garden Province Stakes	(South Africa)	Bold Ellinore	Weichong Marwing
58	2007	Canon Gold Cup	(South Africa)	Thundering Star	Johnny Geroudis
59	2008	Dubai Sheema Classic	(United Arab Emirates)	Sun Classique	Kevin Shea
60	2008	QEII Cup	(Hong Kong)	Archipenko	Kevin Shea
61	2008	SA Fillies Sprint	(South Africa)	Rat Burana	Anthony Delpech
62	2008	Golden Horseshoe	(South Africa)	Forest Path	Anthony Delpech
63	2008	Premiers Champion Stakes	(South Africa)	Rocks Off	Kevin Shea
64	2008	Summer Cup	(South Africa)	Rudra	Kevin Shea
65	2008	Hong Kong Cup	(Hong Kong)	Eagle Mountain	Kevin Shea
66	2009	SA Classic	(South Africa)	Forest Path	Raymond Danielson
67	2009	SA Derby	(South Africa)	Bouquet Garni	Anthony Delpech
68	2009	Woolavington Stakes	(South Africa)	Zirconeum	Kevin Shea
69	2009	Golden Horseshoe	(South Africa)	Musir	Anthony Delpech
70	2009	Thekwini Stakes	(South Africa)	Laverna	Anthony Delpech
71	2009	Paddock Stakes	(South Africa)	Mother Russia	Anton Marcus
72	2010	Majorca Stakes	(South Africa)	Gluwein	Anthony Delpech
73	2010	Empress Club Stakes	(South Africa)	Mother Russia	Anton Marcus
74	2010	SA Fillies Classic	(South Africa)	Here To Win (BRZ)	Anthony Delpech
75	2010	SA Derby	(South Africa)	Irish Flame	Kevin Shea
76	2010	Singapore Cup	(Singapore)	Lizard's Desire	Kevin Shea
77	2010	Daily News	(South Africa)	Irish Flame	Kevin Shea
78	2010	Golden Slipper	(South Africa)	Mahbooba	Kevin Shea
79	2010	Vodacom Durban July	(South Africa)	Bold Silvano	Anthony Delpech
80	2010	Garden Province Stakes	(South Africa)	Here To Win (BRZ)	Anthony Delpech
81	2010	Canon Gold Cup	(South Africa)	Ancestral Fore	Kevin Shea
82	2010	Sansui Summer Cup	(South Africa)	Flirtation	Randall Simons
83	2011	Queen's Plate	(South Africa)	Mother Russia	Anton Marcus
84	2011	SA Fillies Classic	(South Africa)	Igugu	Anthony Delpech
85	2011	Woolavington Stakes	(South Africa)	Igugu	Anthony Delpech
86	2011	Vodacom Durban July	(South Africa)	Igugu	Anthony Delpech
87	2011	Thekwini Stakes	(South Africa)	Amanee	Kevin Shea
88	2012	J&B Met	(South Africa)	Igugu	Anthony Delpech
89	2012	Jebel Hatta	(United Arab Emirates)	Masterofhounds (USA)	Kevin Shea
90	2012	Empress Club Stakes	(South Africa)	Europa Point	Anton Marcus
91	2012	SA Nursery	(South Africa)	Soft Falling Rain	Anton Marcus
92	2012	President's Champion Challenge	(South Africa)	Europa Point	Anthony Delpech
93	2012	Woolavington Stakes	(South Africa)	Viva Maria	Anthony Delpech
94	2012	Durban Golden Slipper	(South Africa)	Rumya	Anthony Delpech
95	2012	Cape Fillies Guineas	(South Africa)	Rumya	Anthony Delpech
96	2013	Al Quoz Sprint	(United Arab Emirates)	Shea Shea	Christophe Soumillon
97	2013	Daily News 2000	(South Africa)	Vercingetorix	Anthony Delpech
98	2014	Jebel Hatta	(United Arab Emirates)	Vercingetorix	Christophe Soumillon
99	2014	Hong Kong Champions Mile	(Hong Kong)	Variety Club	Anton Marcus
100	2014	Allan Robertson Fillies Championship	(South Africa)	Alboran Sea	Muzi Yeni
101	2014	Cape Fillies Guineas	(South Africa)	Majmu	Anthony Delpech
102	2015	Cape Flying Championship	(South Africa)	Alboran Sea	Weichong Marwing
103	2015	Cape Derby	(South Africa)	Ertijaal	Gavin Lerena
104	2015	Empress Club Stakes	(South Africa)	Majmu	Anthony Delpech
105	2015	Computaform Sprint	(South Africa)	Alboran Sea	Anthony Delpech
106	2015	SA Oaks	(South Africa)	Pine Princess	Anthony Delpech
107	2015	Allan Robertson Championship	(South Africa)	Entisaar	Johnny Geroudis
108	2015	Gold Cup	(South Africa)	Wild One	Anthony Delpech
109	2015	Cape Guineas	(South Africa)	Noah From Goa	Anthony Delpech
110	2017	SA Fillies Classic	(South Africa)	Orchid Island	Anthony Delpech
111	2017	Empress Club Stakes	(South Africa)	Nother Russia	Craig Zackey
112	2017	SA Classic	(South Africa)	Heavenly Blue	Callan Murray
113	2017	SA Nursery	(South Africa)	Mustaaqueem	Callan Murray
114	2017	Computaform Sprint	(South Africa)	Rafeef	Callan Murray
115	2018	Empress Club Stakes	(South Africa)	Nother Russia	Craig Zackey
116	2018	SA Fillies Classic	(South Africa)	Takingthepeace	Callan Murray
117	2018	Premier's Champion Stakes	(South Africa)	Soqrat	Randall Simons
118	2018	Cape Guineas	(South Africa)	Soqrat	Randall Simons
119	2019	Cape Derby	(South Africa)	Atyaab	Diego De Gouveia
120	2019	Horse Chestnut Stakes	(South Africa)	Soqrat	Randall Simons
121	2019	SA Classic	(South Africa)	Hawwaam	Gavin Lerena
122	2019	Premiers Champions Challenge	(South Africa)	Hawwaam	Anton Marcus
123	2019	Daily News 2000	(South Africa)	Hawwaam	Anton Marcus
124	2020	Cartier Paddock Stakes	(South Africa)	Queen Supreme	Callan Murray
125	2020	Horse Chestnut Stakes	(South Africa)	Hawwaam	Callan Murray
126	2020	Premiers Champions Challenge	(South Africa)	Hawwaam	Callan Murray
127	2021	Cartier Paddock Stakes	(South Africa)	Queen Supreme	Keagan De Melo
128	2021	SA Classic	(South Africa)	Malmoos	Luke Ferraris
129	2021	SA Derby	(South Africa)	Malmoos	Luke Ferraris
130	2022	SA Derby	(South Africa)	Aragosta	Richard Fourie
131	2022	Daily News 2000	(South Africa)	Safe Passage	Muzi Yeni
132	2022	Hollywoodbets Gold Challenge	(South Africa)	Al Muthana	Richard Fourie
133	2022	Hollywoodbets Durban July	(South Africa)	Sparkling Water	S'manga Khumalo
134	2023	Majorca Stakes	(South Africa)	Desert Miracle	Christophe Soumillon
135	2023	Empress Club Stakes	(South Africa)	Desert Miracle	Craig Zackey
136	2024	SA Classic	(South Africa)	Gimme A Nother	JP van der Merwe
137	2024	Empress Club Stakes	(South Africa)	Gimme A Nother	JP van der Merwe
138	2024	Woolavington 2000	(South Africa)	Silver Sanctuary	Richard Fourie
139	2024	Hollywoodbets Gold Challenge	(South Africa)	Dave The King	Muzi Yeni
140	2024	Ridgemont Garden Province	(South Africa)	Humdinger	Piere Strydom
141	2024	HKJC Champions Cup	(South Africa)	Dave The King	Richard Fourie
142	2025	Hollywoodbets Gold Challenge*	(South Africa)	Dave The King	Callan Murray
143	2025	Hollywoodbets Cape Guineas*	(South Africa)	Jan Van Goyen	Callan Murray

- Winners trained in partnership with son Mathew de Kock.
