= Naval Crown (horse) =

British Thoroughbred racehorse

- Sire: Dubawi
- Grandsire: Dubai Millennium
- Dam: Come Alive
- Damsire: Dansili
- Sex: Colt
- Foaled: 5 February 2018
- Country: United Kingdom
- Colour: Bay
- Breeder: Godolphin
- Owner: Godolphin
- Trainer: Charlie Appleby
- Record: 15: 4-2-5
- Earnings: £833,900

Major wins
- Meydan Classic (2021); Al Fahidi Fort (2022); Platinum Jubilee Stakes (2022)

Naval Crown (foaled 5 February 2018) is a British Thoroughbred racehorse. As a juvenile in 2020 he won only one of his five races but was placed three times in high-class races. In the following year he won the Listed Meydan Classic in Dubai as well as running fourth in the 2000 Guineas and second in the Jersey Stakes. As a four-year-old he won the Al Fahidi Fort in Dubai and recorded a Group 1 Platinum Jubilee Stakes at Royal Ascot.

== Background ==
Naval Crown is a bay horse with a white socks on his hind legs who was bred and owned by Sheikh Mohammed's Godolphin organisation. He was sent into training with Charlie Appleby, whose stable is based at Newmarket, Suffolk, but typically relocates to Dubai in winter.

He was from the twelfth crop of foals sired by Dubawi, whose wins included the Irish 2,000 Guineas and the Prix Jacques Le Marois. At stud, Dubawi has been a highly successful breeding stallion, siring major winners such as Ghaiyyath, Too Darn Hot, Al Kazeem, Makfi, Old Persian, Lucky Nine and Night of Thunder. Naval Crown's dam Come Alive showed good racing ability in France, winning three races including the Listed Prix Amandine. As a female-line descendant of the Irish 1,000 Guineas winner Arctique Royale she was closely related to many good winners including Ardross, Moonstone and US Army Ranger.

== Racing career ==
=== 2020: two-year-old season ===
Naval Crown began his racing career on 10 July in a maiden race over seven furlongs on soft ground at Newmarket Racecourse when he started at odds of 5/1 and finished third behind Youth Spirit, beaten just over a length by the winner. The colt was then moved up in class and started favourite for the Listed Pat Eddery Stakes at Ascot Racecourse two weeks later but came home third behind Chindit and Cobhfield. On 21 August at York Racecourse Naval Crown started the 5/4 favourite for a maiden race in which he was ridden by William Buick and recorded his first success as he led from the start and won "easily" by four and a half lengths.

For his two remaining races of the season Naval Crown was sent to race in France and was the beaten favourite on both occasions. In the Prix La Rochette over 1400 metres at Longchamp Racecourse on 2 September he led for most of the way before being overtaken in the last 100 metres and finished third behind Go Athletico and Sealiway. A month later in the Prix Thomas Bryon over 1600 metres at Saint-Cloud Racecourse he again set off in front and opened up a big lead but tired in the closing stages and came home third behind Normandy Bridge, beaten four and a half lengths by the winner.

=== 2021: three-year-old season ===
In early 2021 Naval Crown was moved to Godolphin's training base in Dubai and ran twice at Meydan. On 4 February he started at odds of 11/4 for the Group 3 UAE 2000 Guineas over 1600 metres on dirt and came home third behind Mouheeb and Meshakel. Three weeks later he was switched back to turf for the Listed Meydan Classic over the same distance in which he started 11/4 second choice in the betting behind Appleby's other runner Master of the Seas. Ridden by Mickael Barzalona he led from the start, went clear of his opponents in the straight and won by a length and a half from his better fancied stablemate. Appleby commented: "We pitched Naval Crown at Group level as a two-year-old because he was showing us the right stuff... We weren’t planning to run him in the UAE 2,000 Guineas but he was working nicely on the dirt at home and therefore we felt that we would give him a chance in that race, where he ran very solidly. Returning back to turf was always going to suit, so he came into tonight race-fit and with conditions to suit. He has gone and done it nicely. Personally, I think the horse will come back in trip when we get him back to Europe... He has plenty of speed."

On his return to Europe Naval Crown started favourite for the European Free Handicap over seven furlongs at Newmarket on 14 April but after leading for most of the way he was run down in the final strides by the Queen's colt Tactical and was beaten a neck into second place. On his next start, Naval Crown contested the 2000 Guineas over the Rowley Mile at Newmarket on 1 May and started a 50/1 outsider. He again led from the start before being overtaken a furlong from the finish and came home fourth behind Poetic Flare, Master of the Seas and Lucky Vega. The colt was dropped back in distance for the seven furlong Jersey Stakes at Royal Ascot in June and started joint-favourite alongside his stablemate Creative Force. The field split into two groups across the wide Ascot straight and although Naval Crown dominated the group racing up the stands side (the left side from the jockeys' viewpoint) he was beaten into second by Creative Force, who raced down the centre. In July he was sent to France for the Group 1 Prix Jean Prat over 1400 metres at Deauville Racecourse. Naval Crown set the pace as usual but tired badly in the last 200 metres and finished eighth of the thirteen runners behind Laws of Indices, beaten more than ten lengths by the winner. Appleby opted to rest the colt for the rest of the season. The trainer later explained that Naval Crown narrowly avoided being gelded at the end of the year.

=== 2022: four-year-old season ===
As in the previous year, Naval Crown was based in Dubai for the early part of 2022. He began his third campaign in the Group 3 Al Fahidi Fort over 1400 metres at Meydan on 21 January when he was ridden by Buick and started the 8/11 favourite against thirteen opponents. After tracking the leaders he went to the front 300 metres out and kept on well to win by a length from the locally-trained Story of Light, in a course record time of 1:22.02. Charlie Appleby said: "There was a bit of jostling early on but William got Naval Crown into a nice position. He was one of the class horses in the race and one of the younger ones as well, so he had some fresher legs. We purposely put him away after the mid-season in Europe and he has got the job done nicely. I see him as a proper seven-furlong horse. He has a lot of natural pace and will sharpen up a bit for tonight’s run. He is making up into a nice four-year-old and I think he has a good few years being competitive at this sort of trip." Buick described the winner as "a brave little horse, who travels great."

In the following month the colt was sent to Saudi Arabia for the Group 3 1351 Turf Sprint at King Abdulaziz Racetrack in Riyadh. He started favourite and led for most of the way but after being overtaken in the last 200 metres he faded rapidly and came home eleventh of the fourteen runners behind the Japanese filly Songline, beaten more than seven lengths by the winner. On 26 March at Meydan the colt was dropped back to 1200 metres for the Group 1 Al Quoz Sprint and started a 20/1 outsider. Ridden by Frankie Dettori he raced just behind the leaders and kept on well in the closing stages to finish fourth behind A Case of You, Happy Romance and Man of Promise.

Naval Crown began his European campaign in the Group 1 Platinum Jubilee Stakes over six furlongs at Royal Ascot on 18 June and started at odds of 33/1 in a twenty-four-runner field. He was ridden by James Doyle as Buick had opted to ride his more fancied stablemate Creative Force. The pair had raced against each other in a private gallop a few days before the race and although Creative Force had finished better Appleby said that "there wasn't a lot between them". The Australian colt Home Affairs started favourite while the other contenders included A Case of You, Alcohol Free, Emaraaty Ana, Campanelle, Artorius (Blue Diamond Stakes) and Grenadier Guards. In an echo of the Jersey Stakes twelve months earlier Naval Crown raced up the stands side whilst Creative Force ran down the centre of the track. After racing prominently from the start, Naval Crown took the lead in the stands-side group a furlong out and overtook Creative Force on the line to win by a neck with Artorius and Capanelle dead-heating for third. After the race Appleby commented "I said to James to try and keep on the coat-tails of the others if you can because he’s going to be running on at the finish... he was still learning to sprint, and he’d only done it once before in his life when he ran in Dubai last time. It’s a stiff six here, so that was going to help. I don’t see any reason why we won’t go to the July Cup".

== Pedigree ==
Pedigree of Naval Crown (GB), bay colt, 2018
Sire Dubawi (IRE) 2002	Dubai Millennium (GB); 1996	Seeking The Gold (USA)	Mr. Prospector
Sire Dubawi (IRE) 2002	Dubai Millennium (GB); 1996	Seeking The Gold (USA)	Con Game
Sire Dubawi (IRE) 2002	Dubai Millennium (GB); 1996	Colorado Dancer (IRE)	Shareef Dancer (USA)
Sire Dubawi (IRE) 2002	Dubai Millennium (GB); 1996	Colorado Dancer (IRE)	Fall Aspen (USA)
Sire Dubawi (IRE) 2002	Zomaradah (GB); 1995	Deploy	Shirley Heights
Sire Dubawi (IRE) 2002	Zomaradah (GB); 1995	Deploy	Slightly Dangerous (USA)
Sire Dubawi (IRE) 2002	Zomaradah (GB); 1995	Jawaher (IRE)	Dancing Brave (USA)
Sire Dubawi (IRE) 2002	Zomaradah (GB); 1995	Jawaher (IRE)	High Tern
Dam Come Alive (GB) 2013	Dansili (GB); 1996	Danehill (USA)	Danzig
Dam Come Alive (GB) 2013	Dansili (GB); 1996	Danehill (USA)	Razyana
Dam Come Alive (GB) 2013	Dansili (GB); 1996	Hasili (IRE)	Kahyasi
Dam Come Alive (GB) 2013	Dansili (GB); 1996	Hasili (IRE)	Kerali (GB)
Dam Come Alive (GB) 2013	Portrayal (USA); 2002	Saint Ballado (CAN)	Halo (USA)
Dam Come Alive (GB) 2013	Portrayal (USA); 2002	Saint Ballado (CAN)	Ballade (USA)
Dam Come Alive (GB) 2013	Portrayal (USA); 2002	True Glory (IRE)	In the Wings (GB)
Dam Come Alive (GB) 2013	Portrayal (USA); 2002	True Glory (IRE)	Truly Special (Family: 23)
