= Ipi Tombe =

Zimbabwean Thoroughbred racehorse

- Sire: Manshood
- Grandsire: Mr. Prospector
- Dam: Carnet de Danse
- Damsire: Dance In Time
- Sex: Mare
- Foaled: 1998
- Country: Zimbabwe
- Colour: Bay
- Breeder: Peter J. Moor
- Owner: 1)P Govender 2) Sunmark Stable; 2) Team Valor, Sunmark Stable, WinStar Farm (August 2002); 3) Richard Santulli and Barry Weisbord (November 2004)
- Trainer: Noelene Peech (ZWE); Mike De Kock (S.A.); W. Elliott Walden (USA)
- Record: 14: 12-2-0
- Earnings: US$1,529,799 (equivalent)

Major wins
- South African Oaks (2002); South African Fillies Guineas (2002); Woolavington Stakes (2002); Durban July Handicap (2002); Al Fahidi Fort (2003); Jebel Hatta (2003); Dubai Duty Free Stakes (2003); Locust Grove Handicap (2003)

Awards
- South African Champion Three-Year-Old Filly (2002); Dubai Horse of the Year (2003)

Honours
- Ipi Tombe Challenge at Turffontein Racecourse
- Last updated on 7 October 2007

Ipi Tombe (foaled 10 October 1998 in the Marondera District of Mashonaland East, Zimbabwe) is a champion Thoroughbred racehorse and broodmare. She was bred by Peter J. Moor, chairman of the board of directors of the Thoroughbred Breeders Association of Zimbabwe. With that country in a state of turmoil and near economic collapse following implementation of the government's land reform law that resulted in confiscation and redistribution of horse farms, the granddaughter of Mr. Prospector was sold at the annual Zim Nation yearling auction in Harare for the equivalent of US$30 (thirty dollars). Purchased by a four-man partnership, she was given the name Ipi Tombe which in the Xhosa language (actually: "ipi ntombi") translates as "Where is the girl?"

== Racing in Zimbabwe ==
Conditioned by Zimbabwe's leading trainer, Noelene Peech, Ipi Tombe began her racing career at age three. She made five starts at Borrowdale Park Racecourse in Harare, earning four wins and a second. Her demonstrated abilities were such that her handlers were able to syndicate her to a group of twenty-two South African investors who brought her to race there where stronger competition for higher purse money was available.

== Racing in South Africa ==
Racing under the syndicate's Sunmark Stable banner, Ipi Tombe joined the stable of trainer Noelene Peech and won four races from five starts in her native Zimbabwe. Showing the potential she did, owners Henk Leyenaar, Stephen Tomlinson and Dave Coleman secured half a share for R250 000, the other half remaining with the Sunmark Syndicate, of which Rob Davenport was the nominee, She was sent across the border to Mike de Kock in South Africa., Ipi Tombe's conditioning was entrusted to Mike De Kock, one of South Africa's leading trainers. She made her debut on 9 March 2002, finishing second in the South African Triple Tiara at Turffontein Racecourse in Johannesburg. She would never lose another race in her career.

After her initial defeat, Ipi Tombe then won the South African Oaks, the South African Fillies Guineas, and the Woolavington Stakes but her most important win in 2002 was in the country's most prestigious race, the Durban July Handicap at Greyville Racecourse in Durban. In this Group One race she would be up against the best horses from all over the country, including many older male horses. Ridden by jockey Kevin Shea, Ipi Tombe came from a difficult number eighteen outside post position to put on a powerful stretch drive that made her the first three-year-old filly to win the race in fifty years. Her performances that year earned her South African Champion Three-Year-Old Filly honors.

== Racing in Dubai ==
Ipi Tombe's performances also brought her to the attention of Barry Irwin, head of the Team Valor racing operation based in Versailles, Kentucky whose business acquires racing stock by selling individual horse partnerships to the public. In August 2002, a deal was struck that resulted in Henk Leyenaar, Stephen Tomlinson, Dave Coleman Sunmark Synidcate retaining twenty-five percent interest in the horse with Team Valor also holding twenty-five percent and prominent Kentucky breeder WinStar Farm the owner of the remaining fifty percent.

Shipped to winter at trainer Mike De Kock stables at Nad Al Sheba Racecourse in Dubai, Ipi Tombe made her 2003 debut in March, winning the Group II Haafhd Jebel Hatta in stakes record time. She then defeated male rivals while capturing the Group One Dubai Duty Free Stakes in track record time. Ipi Tombe's outstanding performances would earn her 2003 Dubai Horse of the Year honors.

== Racing in the United States ==
Following her success in Dubai, in April 2003 Ipi Tombe was shipped to Churchill Downs in Louisville, Kentucky where her race conditioning was taken over by Elliott Walden. Ridden by Pat Day in her American debut, Ipi Tombe won the Grade III Locust Grove Handicap at Churchill Downs, making her the first horse bred in Zimbabwe to ever win at the historic Churchill Downs track.

== Stud career ==
A training injury that never healed properly resulted in Ipi Tombe being retired on 22 November 2003 and sent to the renowned Coolmore Stud in Ireland for broodmare duty. In foal to the Champion sire, Sadler's Wells, she was sold at a Tattersalls auction in England in November 2004 for £850,000 to Americans Richard Santulli and Barry Weisbord. As of September 2016, she has produced the following named foals:

- Monastic Springs (colt, 2005) by Sadler's Wells. 1 win in 4 starts.
- Pin Turn (filly, 2006) by Pivotal. 1 win in 11 starts.
- Go For Two (gelding, 2009) by Giant's Causeway, foaled in Kentucky. 1 win in 22 starts.
- Hug Doc (filly, 2010) by Medaglia d'Oro. unraced.
- Dance Marathon (gelding, 2011) by Medaglia d'Oro. winless in 2 starts.
- Bad Call (colt, 2013). winless after 1 start.
- Strictly Biz (colt, 2016) by Fed Biz. 1 win in 4 starts.
