= Kenilworth Racecourse =

Racecourse in South Africa

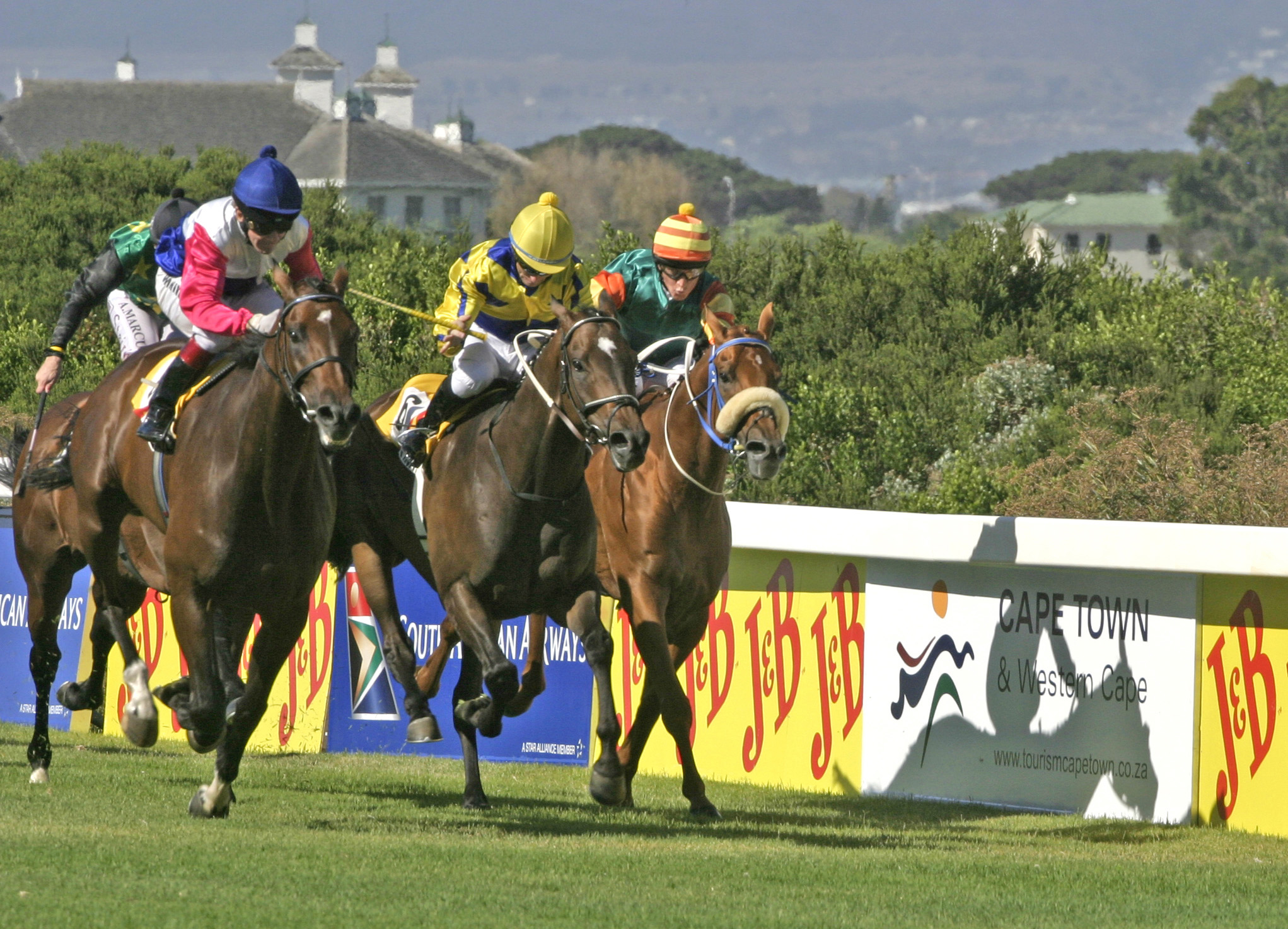
- Thoroughbreds competing at the J&B Met, 2007.
- Location: Kenilworth, Cape Town, South Africa
- Coordinates: 33°59′55″S 18°28′47″E
- Owned by: Cape Turf Club
- Date opened: 1881
- Capacity: 14,000
- Race type: Flat
- Course type: left handed round track (2.8 km)

Kenilworth Racecourse, also known as the Hollywoodbets Kenilworth, is a race track in South Africa for Thoroughbred horse racing founded in 1881 at Kenilworth, Cape Town by the South African Turf Club. The facility has both an inner and outer grass track and is the oldest horse racing track in South Africa.

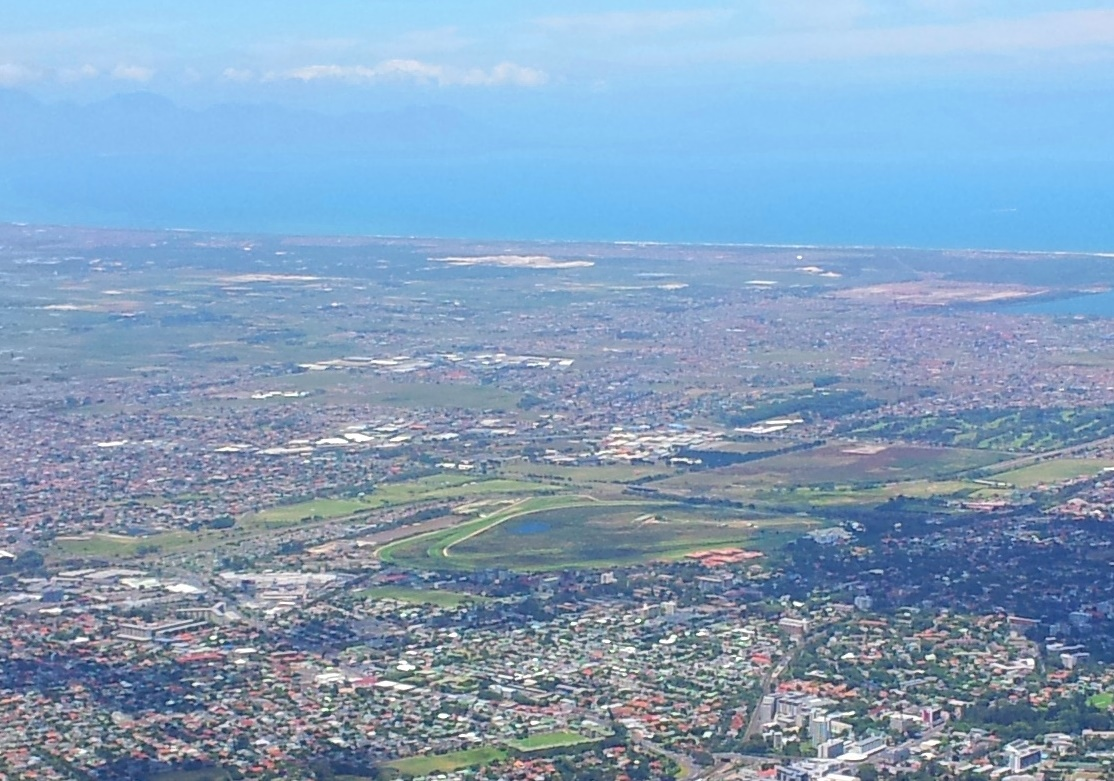
An aerial view of the racecourse and surrounding area from Table Mountain.

The racecourse is host to the Cape Metropolitan Stakes and the King's Plate. The racecourse was visited by King George VI and the rest of the Royal family during their 1947 tour of South Africa.

The racecourse is also notable for hosting the Kenilworth Racecourse Conservation Area since 1985, located in the centre of the racecourse.

The racecourse also hosts a business park that hosts numerous businesses including the headquarters of Pick 'n Pay Stores Limited. Following extensive renovations in 2024 a conference space in addition to numerous sporting and recreational facilities were added.
