= Cape Metropolitan Stakes =

Horse race in Cape Town, South Africa

- Class: Grade One
- Location: Kenilworth Racecourse; Cape Town, South Africa
- Inaugurated: 1883
- Race type: Thoroughbred - Flat racing
- Website: sunmet.co.za

Race information
- Distance: 2,000 metres
- Surface: Turf
- Track: Left-handed
- Purse: R5 Million

The Cape Metropolitan Stakes, currently named the Sun Met (and previously known as the J&B Met), is a Grade 1 thoroughbred horse race run on the turf at Kenilworth Racecourse in Cape Town, South Africa. It is run over 2000m. It was first run in 1883 as the Metropolitan Mile.

It is considered one of the three main feature races in South Africa, alongside the Vodacom Durban July, and the Summer Cup.

== Sponsors ==
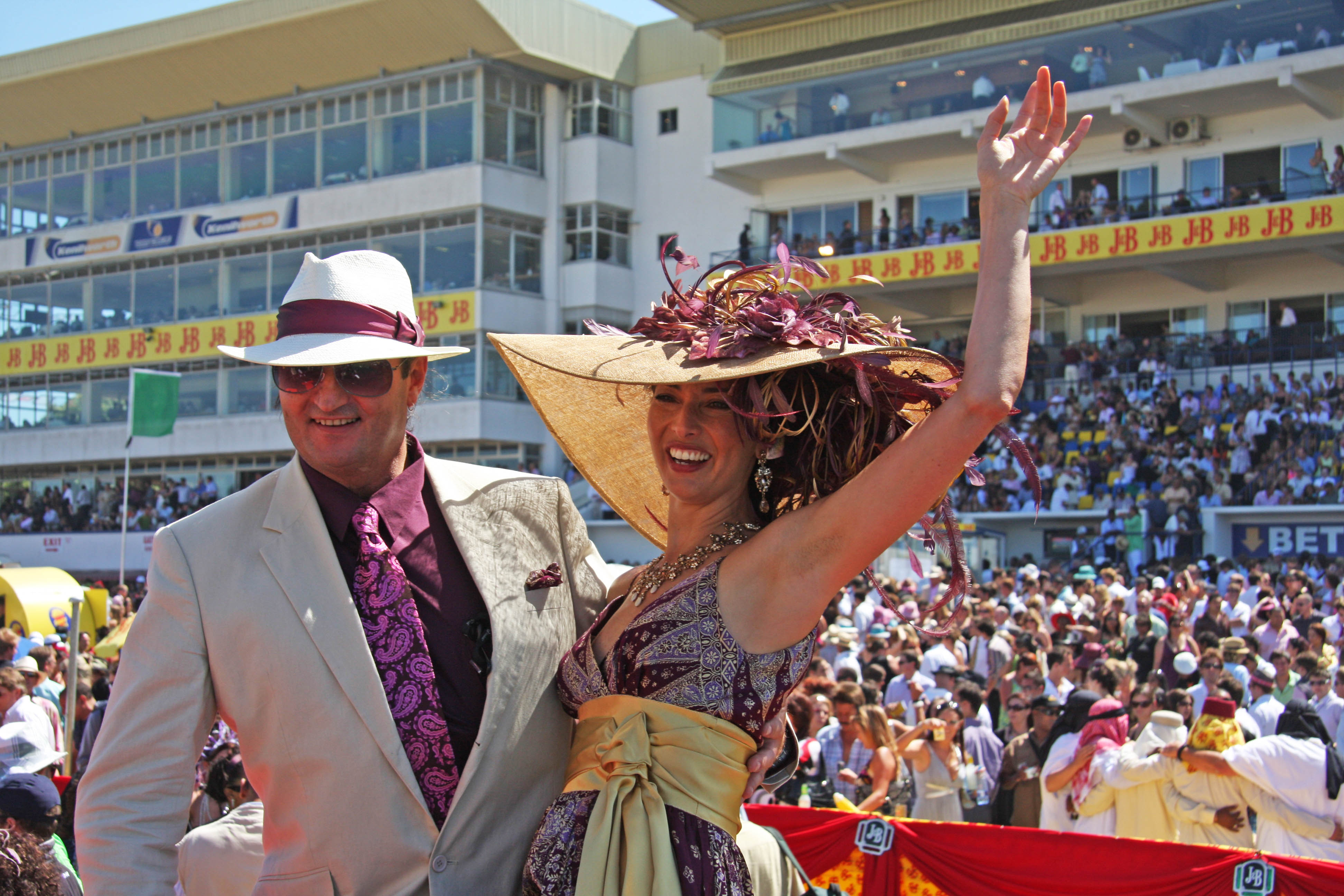
The Met is a popular fashion event, especially for couples. Especially during its J&B sponsorship period.

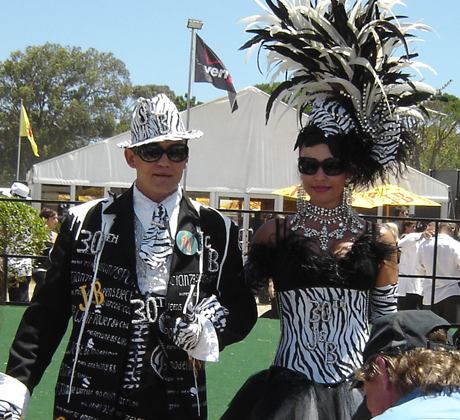
A winning couple from the fashion component of the 2007 Met on its 30th anniversary.

J&B Whiskey (part of the Diageo group at the time) were sponsors of the Cape Metropolitan Stakes from 1977 to 2016. The stake pot offered by the company was R40,000, making it a record purse for a race at the time. The race was commonly referred to as the J&B Met during their rein as sponsors.

In 2017 Sun International became sponsors of the race, with it being referred to as the Sun Met.

World Sports Betting (WSB) a South African sports and live games betting site took over sponsorship in 2022 and the race was renamed to the World Sports Betting Cape Town Met. Press release: https://www.sportingpost.co.za/2021/12/met-gets-a-new-sponsor/

== Past winners ==
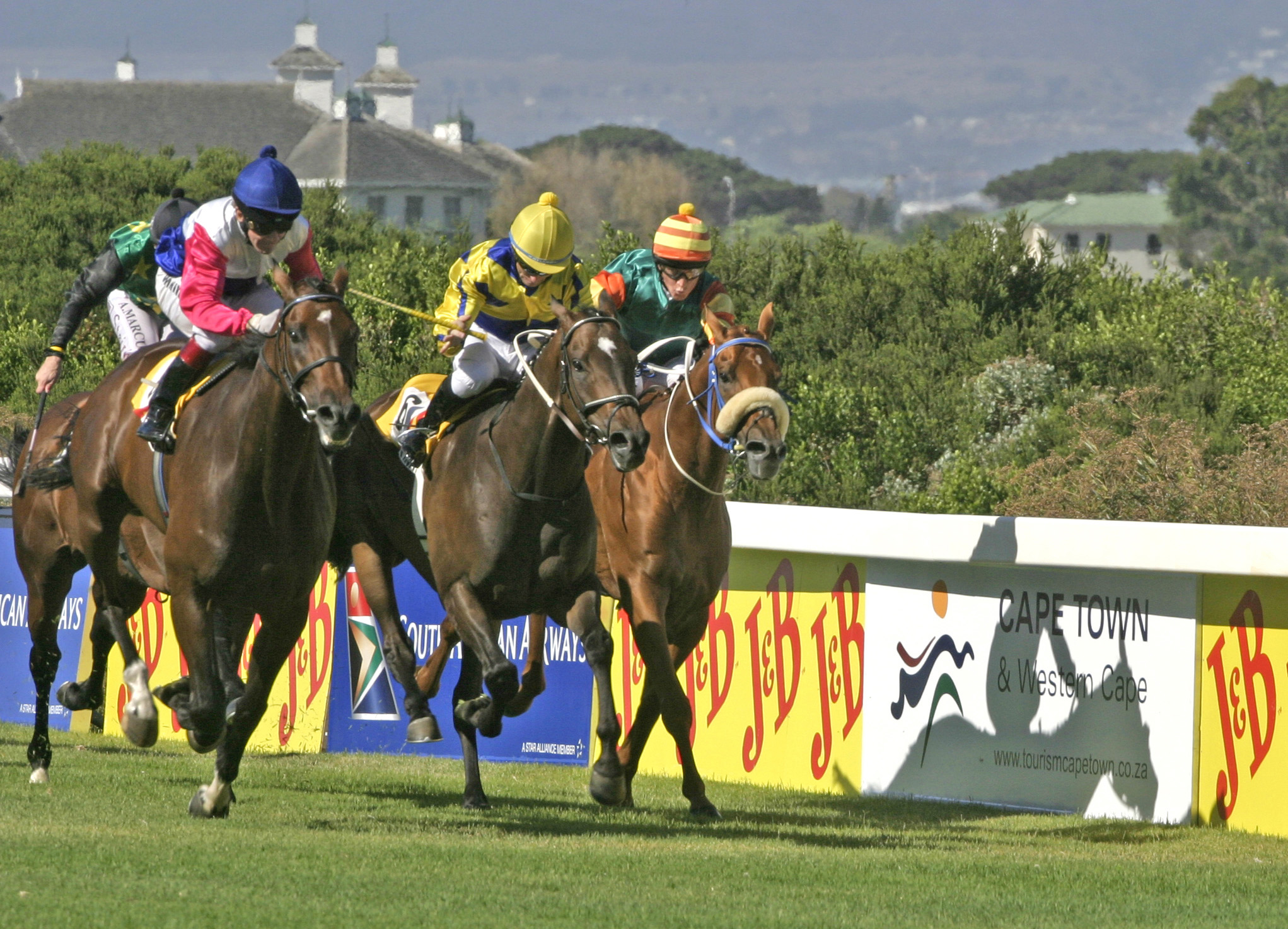
Horses racing during the 2007 event.

Listed below are the past winners of the Met.

Edition	Year	Horse	Jockey	Trainer
97	1959	Bulbul	Colin Palm	Cookie Amos
98	1960	Appeal Court		
99	1961	Frantic		
100	1962	Jerez	Stanley Amos	Cookie Amos
101	1963	Polar Bear		
102	1964	The Giant	Colin Palm	Cookie Amos
103	1965	Speciality		
104	1966	Renounce	Duncan Alexander	Cookie Amos
105	1967	Ding Dong	James Maree	
106	1968			
107	1969	Peter Beware		Terrance Millard
108	1970	Snow Fun	Duncan Alexander	J Bell
109	1971	Night Off		
110	1972	Force Ten		
111	1973	Gold Flame		Terence D’Arcy
112	1974	Yataghan	Bertie Hayden	Syd Laird
113	1975	Sledgehammer	Michael Roberts	Fred Rickaby
114	1976	Gatecrasher	Garth Puller	Herman Brown
115	1977	Bahadur		
116	1978	Politician	Bertie Hayden	Syd Laird
117	1979	Politician	Bertie Hayden	Syd Laird
118	1980	Sunshine Man	Felix Coetzee	Peter Kannemeyer
119	1981	Queen’s Elect		
120	1982	Foveros	Basil Marcus	Herman Brown snr
121	1983	Arctic Cove		Terrance Millard
122	1984	Wolf Power	Jeff Lloyd	Ricky Maingard
123	1985	Charles Fortune	Grant Kotzen	Michael Airey
124	1986	Wild West	Greg Holme	Ralph Rixon
125	1987	Model Man	Basil Marcus	Patrick Lunn
126	1988	Mark Anthony	Felix Coetzee	Terrance Millard
127	1989	Fearless Streaker	Felix Coetzee	
128	1990	Jungle Warrior	Felix Coetzee	Eric Sands
129	1991	Olympic Duel	Felix Coetzee	Terrance Millard
130	1992	Divine Master	Jeff Lloyd	Peter Kannemeyer
131	1993	Empress Club	Anton Marcus	Tony Millard
132	1994	Pas De Quoi	Garth Puller	Peter Kannemeyer
133	1995	Surfing Home	Jeff Lloyd	Tony Millard
134	1996	La Fabulous	Robbie Fradd	Vaughan Marshall
135	1997	London News	Douglas Whyte	Alec Laird
136	1998	Imperious Sue	Anthony Delpech	David Payne
137	1999	Horse Chestnut	Waichong Marwing	Mike de Kock
138	2000	Badger’s Coast	Guillermo Figueroa	Mike de Kock
139	2001	Bunter Barlow	Glen Hatt	Mike Bass
140	2002	Polo Classic	Barend Vorster	Eric Sands
141	2003	Angus	Piere Strydom	Brett Crawford
142	2004	Yard-Arm	Mark Khan	Geoff Woodruff
143	2005	Alastor	Garth Puller	Sean Tarry
144	2006	Zebra Crossing	Jeff Lloyd	Neil Bruss
145	2007	Pocket Power	Jeff Lloyd	Mike Bass
146	2008	Pocket Power	Bernard Faydherbe	Mike Bass
147	2009	Pocket Power	Bernard Faydherbe	Mike Bass
148	2010	River Jetez	Glen Hatt	Mike Bass
149	2011	Past Master	Gerrit Schlechter	Darryl Hodgson
150	2012	Igugu	Anthony Delpech	Mike de Kock
151	2013	Martial Eagle	Aldo Domeyer	Yogas Govender
152	2014	Hill Fifty Four	Anton Marcus	Vaughan Marshall
153	2015	Futura	B Fayd'herbe	Brett Crawford
154	2016	Smart Call	Juan Paul V'd Merwe	Alec Laird
155	2017	Whisky Baron	Greg Cheyne	Brett Crawford
156	2018	Oh Susanna	Grant Van Niekerk	Justin Snaith
157	2019	Rainbow Bridge	Anton Marcus	Eric Sands
158	2020	One World	MJ Byleveld	Vaughan Marshall
159	2021	Rainbow Bridge	Luke Ferraris	Eric Sands
160	2022	Kommetdieding	Gavin Lerena	H W Crawford & M Rix
161	2023	Jet Dark	Richard Fourie	Justin Snaith
162	2024	Double Superlative	Daniel Muscutt	Justin Snaith
163	2025	Eight On Eighteen	Richard Fourie	Justin Snaith
