= Gladiatorus =

American-bred Thoroughbred racehorse

- Sire: Silic
- Grandsire: Sillery
- Dam: Gmaasha
- Damsire: Kris
- Sex: Stallion
- Foaled: 28 March 2005
- Country: United States
- Colour: Bay
- Breeder: Azienda Agricola le Ferriere di Raponi Giampaolo
- Owner: Razza Dell'Olmo; Mansoor bin Mohammed al Maktoum; Godolphin
- Trainer: Riccardo Menichetti; Maria Rita Salvioni; Mubarak bin Shafya; Saeed bin Suroor
- Record: 17: 10-2-0
- Earnings: £2,562,891

Major wins
- Criterium Partenopeo (2007); Criterium Varesino (2007); Premio Toscana (2007); Premio Rumon (2007); Al Fahidi Fort (2009); Dubai Duty Free (2009); Premio Vittorio di Capua (2009)

Gladiatorus (foaled 28 March 2005) is an American-bred Thoroughbred racehorse and sire. He was initially trained in Italy where he was one of the best juvenile colts of 2007, winning six races (four of them at Listed level) and finishing runner-up in the Group 1 Gran Criterium. He was then acquired by Godolphin but had training problems and missed the whole of the next season. He reached his peak in the early part of 2009 when he won his first three races in Dubai including emphatic victories in the Al Fahidi Fort and the Dubai Duty Free. He was less successful when campaigned in Europe but recorded a final major victory when taking the Premio Vittorio di Capua and was rated one of the best racehorses in the world at the end of the year. In 2019 Gladiatorus alongside Nocturnal Fox is standing in John Lynch's Windmill View Stud Ballinasloe County Galway Ireland. Notably Windmill View Stud produced Just A Par sired by Island House, foaled by TheBrownHen.

== Background ==
Gladiatorus is a bay horse with a white star and snip and three white socks bred in Kentucky by the Italian breeding company Azienda Agricola le Ferriere di Raponi Giampaolo. In October 2006 the yearling colt was consigned to the Fasig-Tipton sale and was bought for $8,000 by the bloodstock agent Federico Barberini. He was imported to Italy where entered the ownership of the Razza Dell'Olmo stable and was sent into training with Riccardo Menichetti.

He was one of the most successful racehorses sired by Silic, a French-bred stallion who won the Breeders' Cup Mile in 1999. Gladiatorus's dam Gmaasha never raced but was a daughter of the racehorse and broodmare Al Bahathri.

== Racing career ==
=== 2007: two-year-old season ===
Gladiatorus began his racing career in the Premio Germanio over 1400 metres at Naples Racecourse on 7 June when he started at odds of 7.9/1 and won by one and three quarter lengths from the favourite Jay Force. Nine days later he was stepped up in class for the Group 3 Premio Primi Passi at the San Siro Racecourse in Milan in which he came home sixth of the eleven runners behind his stablemate Magritte. He was then dropped back in class and ran up three quick wins, taking the Premio Tommy Way over 1500 metres at Naples on 1 July, the Listed Criterium Partenopeo over the same course and distance two weeks later and the Listed Criterium Varesino over 1600 metres at Varese on 4 August. His unbeaten streak came to an end on 19 August in the Criterium Labronico at Livorno Racecourse when he was beaten into second place by the filly Yacht Woman. In the Listed Premio Toscana, over 1500 metres at Florence on 9 September, the colt returned to winning form, leading for most of the race and finishing a length in front of Eldest.

For his last two races of the season, Gladiatorus was transferred to the training stable of Maria Rita Salvioni. On his first run for his new trainer, the colt was ridden by Germano Marcelli and started at odds of 3.75/1 for the Listed Premio Rumon over 1600 metres at the Capannelle Racecourse in Rome on 30 September. Racing on heavy ground, he led from the start, drew clear of his rivals in the straight and won "comfortably" by three lengths. Gladiatorus was partnered by Frankie Dettori when he contested Italy's most prestigious race for two-year-olds, the Group 1 Gran Criterium at San Siro and started the 3.9/1 fourth choice in a nine-runner field. He went well clear of his opponents in the straight but was overtaken 200 metres from the finish and beaten by half a length by the British-trained favourite Scintillo.

At the end of the year Gladiatorus was acquired by Sheikh Mohammed's Godolphin organisation and was sent to be trained in Dubai by Saeed bin Suroor.

=== 2009: four-year-old season ===
Gladiatorus missed the whole of the 2008 season. In the early part of 2009, he raced in the colours of Sheikh Mohammed's son Mansour and was trained by Mubarak bin Shafya. Godolphin's racing manager Simon Crisford later explained. "We had him in Dubai the winter after we bought him and he returned to Newmarket with the rest of the string for the British season. But he proved to have a slight issue with his pelvis, the faintest of fractures, and he was a big, weak sort of horse anyway, so the decision was made to back off him and give him the time to develop he needed. We sent him off to Mubarak's stable in the desert, away from our training centre and the racecourse."

He began his campaign on 22 January in a handicap race over 1550 metres at Nad Al Sheba Racecourse in which he was ridden by Ahmed Ajtebi. He took the lead after 300 metres, drew away in the straight and won by two and a half lengths from the favourite Calming Influence. On 19 February he was moved up to Group 2 class for the Al Fahidi Fort over 1600 metres at the same track and started second favourite behind the South African gelding Imbongi. Ridden by Royston Ffrench he took the lead early and was never seriously challenged, pulling away from his opponents in the straight and winning "easily" by almost six lengths. After the race Ffrench commented, "I was never concerned; the trainer said he was a really nice horse and to ride him confidently from the front. It has certainly worked well!". On 28 March, with Ajtebi in the saddle, Gladiatorus was one of sixteen horses to contest the Dubai Duty Free over 1800 metres at Nad Al Sheba. The Queen Elizabeth II Cup winner Archipenko started favourite, while the other runners in an international field included Paco Boy, Vodka, Creachadoir, Presvis, Kip Deville and Jay Peg. Gladiatorus went to the front soon after the start, opened up a clear advantage approaching the straight, and came home three and a quarter lengths in front of Presvis. Ajtebi, a former camel racing jockey said after the race, "I always said I wanted the UAE to be proud of me and I hope the country is now. We were always going to attack from the front as that's how he won last time. This is a dream come true and I am so grateful to everyone in helping me get where I am now". Mubarak bin Shayfa commented, "He's a special horse. I thought he would win easy".

After his win in the Duty Free, Gladiatorus was taken back into Godolphin's ownership and was sent to England, where he was trained by Saeed bin Suroor. The horse was campaigned in Europe but his form was initially disappointing as he ran sixth behind Paco Boy in when favourite for the Queen Anne Stakes at Royal Ascot in June and then finished eighth of nine behind Goldikova in the Prix Jacques Le Marois at Deauville Racecourse in August. At Longchamp Racecourse on 9 September, he finished fifth of eight behind Aqlaam in the Prix du Moulin. On 11 October Gladiatorus returned to Italy for the first time in almost two years to contest the Group 1 Premio Vittorio di Capua over 1600 metres at San Siro. Ridden by Ajtebi he started the 1.8/1 favourite ahead of ten opponents including Major Cadeaux (Sandown Mile) from England, Wislide (Prix Chloé) from France and Precious Boy (Mehl-Mulhens-Rennen) from Germany. Employing his customary front-running style, Gladiatorus won by four and a half lengths.

For his final start, Gladiatorus was sent to California for the Breeders' Cup Mile at Santa Anita Park on 7 November. He held a narrow lead for most of the way but was overtaken a quarter of a mile from the finish and faded to come home ninth of the eleven runners behind Goldikova.

In the 2009 World Thoroughbred Rankings Gladiatorus was given a rating of 125, making him the seventh-best racehorse in the world.

== Stud record ==
At the end of his racing career Gladiatorus was retired to become a breeding stallion at the Allevamento di Besnate in Italy. For the 2018 season he moved to the Withyslade Farm in Wiltshire, England. The best of his offspring has been the Listed winner Presley.

== Pedigree ==
Pedigree of Gladiatorus (USA), bay horse, 2005
Sire Silic (FR) 1995	Sillery (USA); 1988	Blushing Groom (FR)	Red God (USA)
Sire Silic (FR) 1995	Sillery (USA); 1988	Blushing Groom (FR)	Runaway Bride (GB)
Sire Silic (FR) 1995	Sillery (USA); 1988	Silvermine (FR)	Bellypha (IRE)
Sire Silic (FR) 1995	Sillery (USA); 1988	Silvermine (FR)	Sevres
Sire Silic (FR) 1995	Balletomane (IRE); 1988	Sadler's Wells (USA)	Northern Dancer (CAN)
Sire Silic (FR) 1995	Balletomane (IRE); 1988	Sadler's Wells (USA)	Fairy Bridge
Sire Silic (FR) 1995	Balletomane (IRE); 1988	Franconia (AUS)	Rheingold (IRE)
Sire Silic (FR) 1995	Balletomane (IRE); 1988	Franconia (AUS)	Miss Glasso (GB)
Dam Gmaasha (IRE) 1989	Kris (GB); 1976	Sharpen Up	Atan (USA)
Dam Gmaasha (IRE) 1989	Kris (GB); 1976	Sharpen Up	Rocchetta
Dam Gmaasha (IRE) 1989	Kris (GB); 1976	Doubly Sure	Reliance (FR)
Dam Gmaasha (IRE) 1989	Kris (GB); 1976	Doubly Sure	Soft Angels
Dam Gmaasha (IRE) 1989	Al Bahathri (USA); 1982	Blushing Groom (FR)	Red God (USA)
Dam Gmaasha (IRE) 1989	Al Bahathri (USA); 1982	Blushing Groom (FR)	Runaway Bride (GB)
Dam Gmaasha (IRE) 1989	Al Bahathri (USA); 1982	Chain Store	Nodouble
Dam Gmaasha (IRE) 1989	Al Bahathri (USA); 1982	Chain Store	General Store (family: 9-e)

- Gladiatorus is inbred 3 × 3 to Blushing Groom, beaning that this stallion appears twice in the third generation of his pedigree.
