= Old Persian (horse) =

British Thoroughbred racehorse

- Sire: Dubawi
- Grandsire: Dubai Millennium
- Dam: Indian Petal
- Damsire: Singspiel
- Sex: Stallion
- Foaled: 14 March 2015
- Country: United Kingdom
- Colour: Bay
- Breeder: Godolphin
- Owner: Godolphin
- Trainer: Charlie Appleby
- Record: 19: 9-1-2
- Earnings: £3,416,207

Major wins
- Fairway Stakes (2018); King Edward VII Stakes (2018); Great Voltigeur Stakes (2018); Dubai City of Gold (2019); Dubai Sheema Classic (2019); Northern Dancer Turf Stakes (2019)

Old Persian (foaled 14 March 2015), is a British-bred Thoroughbred racehorse who has raced in England, Ireland, the United Arab Emirates, Germany, Canada and the United States. He showed promise as a two-year-old in 2017 when he won two minor races from four starts. In the following year he showed top-class form over middle distances, winning the Fairway Stakes, King Edward VII Stakes and Great Voltigeur Stakes as well as finishing second in the Newmarket Stakes and fifth in the St Leger. He improved again as a four-year-old, winning the Dubai City of Gold, Dubai Sheema Classic and Northern Dancer Turf Stakes. He ran poorly in two races as a five-year-old and was retired from racing.

== Background ==
Old Persian is a bay horse with no white markings bred in England by Godolphin. He was sent into training with Charlie Appleby whose horses are based at Newmarket, Suffolk in summer but often spend the winter in Dubai.

He was from the ninth crop of foals sired by Dubawi, whose wins included the Irish 2,000 Guineas and the Prix Jacques Le Marois. At stud, Dubawi has been a highly successful breeding stallion, siring major winners such as Monterosso, Al Kazeem, Makfi, Lucky Nine and Night of Thunder. Old Persian's dam Indian Petal showed no racing ability, finishing unplaced in both of her starts. She was a granddaughter of Massaraat, who was a full-sister to Miesque.

== Racing career ==
=== 2017: two-year-old season ===
Old Persian began his racing career at Newmarket Racecourse on 11 August when he finished third behind Vintager and Symbolization in a seven furlong maiden race, beaten four and three quarter lengths by the winner. Three weeks later he started 10/11 favourite for a novice race (for horses with no more than two previous wins) over one mile on the Polytrack surface at Chelmsford City Racecourse and recorded his first success as he took the lead approaching the final furlong and won "readily" by three and a quarter lengths from Algam. On 7 October he followed up in a similar event over the same distance at Newmarket and won "easily" by four and a half lengths from Gronkowski after accelerating away from his opponents in the last quarter mile. Sixteen days later the colt was moved up in class and started favourite for the Listed Silver Tankard Stakes at Redcar Racecourse but ran poorly on the soft ground and finished seventh of the eight runners.

=== 2018: three-year-old season ===
On 18 April at Newmarket Old Persian began his second season in a handicap race over ten furlongs in which he carried top weight of 133 pounds. Starting the 5/2 favourite he was in contention from the start and stayed on strongly in the closing stages, catching Dukhan on the line and winning by a short head. In the Listed Newmarket Stakes over the same course and distance on 5 May he took the lead a furlong out but was overtaken by his stablemate Key Victory and beaten a length and a quarter into second place. In the Listed Fairway Stakes (again over the same course and distance) two weeks later, Old Persian started the 1/2 favourite against two opponents. Ridden by William Buick he raced in second place before taking the lead two furlongs from the finish and won by half a length from Court House.

At Royal Ascot on 22 June Old Persian was stepped up to Group 2 class for the King Edward VII Stakes and started the 9/2 third choice in the betting behind Delano Roosevelt (runner-up in the Derrinstown Stud Derby Trial) and Raa Atoll. With Buick in the saddle he tracked the leaders before overtaking the front-running Raa Atoll two furlongs from the finish and "ran on strongly" to win by one and three quarter lengths from Rostropovich. After the race Charlie Appleby said: "We couldn't find a hole in him coming into the race, and we always thought stepping him up to a mile and a half would bring the improvement that was going to be needed to win today. He's a typical Dubawi who has improved from 2 to 3, and he'll improve again from 3 to 4, I'm very confident of that. We just wanted to mind him, as we've always liked him and he's got the scope to progress". Eight days after his win at Ascot the colt was sent to Ireland to contest the Irish Derby at the Curragh and came home sixth of the twelve runners behind Latrobe.

In the Group 2 Great Voltigeur Stakes over one and a half miles at York Racecourse on 22 August Old Persian was ridden by James Doyle while Buick partnered the stable's more fancied runner Cross Counter. He started at odds of 7/1 in a nine-runner field which also included Kew Gardens and Wells Farhh Go (Bahrain Trophy). Old Persian raced in second place behind the pacemaker Nelson before taking the lead three furlongs out and held off the sustained challenge of Cross Counter ro win by a short head. Old Persian started at odds of 8/1 for the St Leger Stakes over fourteen and a half furlongs at Doncaster Racecourse on 15 September but after briefly taking the lead in the straight he was overtaken and came home fifth behind Kew Gardens.

In the 2018 World's Best Racehorse Rankings Old Persian was rated the 78th best horse in the world with a rating of 118.

=== 2019: four-year-old season ===
For the winter of 2018/19 Old Persian was sent to Godolphin's training base in Dubai and ran twice at Meydan Racecourse. On his seasonal debut he started the 4/6 favourite against nine opponents for the Group 2 Dubai City of Gold on 9 March. Ridden by Buick he produced a strong late run to take the lead in the closing stages and won by a short head from Racing History with three lengths back to Desert Encounter (Canadian International Stakes) in third place. Appleby commented "He's a horse who's got a bright future ahead of him. He's a multiple Group 2 winner now and won at Royal Ascot. He beat Cross Counter and we know what he went on to do. Coming into this evening, we were pleased with his preparation. There's a little bit of improvement still there to come."

Three weeks later the colt was partnered by Buick when he started 4/5 favourite for the Group 1 Dubai Sheema Classic. Racing History and Desert Encounter while the other runners were Magic Wand and Hunting Horn from Ireland and a three-strong Japanese contingent comprising Rey de Oro, Suave Richard and Cheval Grand. Old Persian settled in fourth place as Rey de Oro set the pace from Magic Wand but began to make progress 800 metres from the finish. After briefly looking to be boxed in on the rail on the final turn he switched to the outside, overtook the rapidly tiring leaders in the straight and kept on well to win by one and a half lengths and half a length from Cheval Grand and Suave Richard. After the race Buick said "He got a lovely trip around. I have to give credit to the horse. He finds his own passage, and, from 3 to 4, he's really improved and he has a big turn of foot now. It was a beautiful performance."

On his return to Europe Old Persian started second favourite for the Coronation Cup at Epsom Racecourse on 31 May but never looked like winning and after being hampered approaching the final furlong he faded badly and came home seventh behind Defoe, beaten more than fourteen lengths by the winner. On 11 August he was sent to Germany and started favourite for the Grosser Preis von Berlin but finished third to French King and Communique after being denied a clear run in the closing stages. Appleby later commented "We were pleased enough with his run... I think the ground was a bit on the soft side for him."

He then travelled to Canada for the Grade I Northern Dancer Turf Stakes over one and a half miles at Woodbine Racetrack on 14 September. Ridden by Doyle he started the odds-on favourite, with the best-fancied of his five opponents being Tiz A Slam (Nijinsky Stakes) and Focus Group (Pan American Stakes). He started slowly but recovered to race in third place behind Cooler Mike and Tiz A Slam before moving into contention on the home turn. Old Persian took the lead early in the stretch, opened up a clear advantage and kept on well to win by two and a half lengths from the outsider Nessy. Doyle commented "From the minute he stepped foot on the track, he wasn't really 100% concentrating. He was more enjoying the crowd rather than what was going on in front of him... we were a bit concerned early. He missed the break, but they went pretty quick and we were able to muster some speed down the fence to secure a bit of space... He's a powerful stayer at this trip with a good turn of foot and when the pace came up in the stretch, he excelled and sprinted away nicely."

On 2 November at Santa Anita Park Old Persian started third favourite for the Breeders' Cup Turf but failed to reproduce his best form and finished eleventh of the twelve runners behind Bricks and Mortar.

In the 2019 World's Best Racehorse Rankings Old Persian was given a rating of 122, making him the 19th best racehorse in the world.

=== 2020: five-year-old season ===
The 2020 flat racing season in Europe was disrupted by the COVID-19 pandemic and Old Persian did not race as a five-year-old until 28 June when he started 1.9/1 second favourite for the Group 1 Grand Prix de Saint-Cloud but after racing in second place for most of the way he tired badly in the closing stages and came home last of the five runners behind Way To Paris. On 9 July at Newmarket he finished sixth of the seven runners behind Dame Malliot in the Princess of Wales's Stakes, beaten more than ten lengths by the winner.

== Pedigree ==
Pedigree of Old Persian (GB), bay horse, 2015
Sire Dubawi (IRE) 2002	Dubai Millennium (GB); 1996	Seeking the Gold (USA)	Mr. Prospector
Sire Dubawi (IRE) 2002	Dubai Millennium (GB); 1996	Seeking the Gold (USA)	Con Game
Sire Dubawi (IRE) 2002	Dubai Millennium (GB); 1996	Colorado Dancer (IRE)	Shareef Dancer (USA)
Sire Dubawi (IRE) 2002	Dubai Millennium (GB); 1996	Colorado Dancer (IRE)	Fall Aspen (USA)
Sire Dubawi (IRE) 2002	Zomaradah (GB); 1995	Deploy	Shirley Heights
Sire Dubawi (IRE) 2002	Zomaradah (GB); 1995	Deploy	Slightly Dangerous (USA)
Sire Dubawi (IRE) 2002	Zomaradah (GB); 1995	Jawaher (IRE)	Dancing Brave (USA)
Sire Dubawi (IRE) 2002	Zomaradah (GB); 1995	Jawaher (IRE)	High Tern
Dam Indian Petal (GB) 2009	Singspiel (IRE); 1992	In The Wings (GB)	Sadler's Wells (USA)
Dam Indian Petal (GB) 2009	Singspiel (IRE); 1992	In The Wings (GB)	High Hawk (IRE)
Dam Indian Petal (GB) 2009	Singspiel (IRE); 1992	Glorious Song (CAN)	Halo (USA)
Dam Indian Petal (GB) 2009	Singspiel (IRE); 1992	Glorious Song (CAN)	Ballade (USA)
Dam Indian Petal (GB) 2009	Wood Vine (USA); 1993	Woodman	Mr. Prospector
Dam Indian Petal (GB) 2009	Wood Vine (USA); 1993	Woodman	Playmate
Dam Indian Petal (GB) 2009	Wood Vine (USA); 1993	Massaraat	Nureyev
Dam Indian Petal (GB) 2009	Wood Vine (USA); 1993	Massaraat	Pasadoble (Family: 20)
