= Dubai Turf =

Horse race in the United Arab Emirates

- Class: Group One
- Location: Meydan Racecourse; Dubai, United Arab Emirates
- Inaugurated: 1996
- Race type: Thoroughbred – Flat racing
- Website: Dubai World Cup

Race information
- Distance: 1,800 metres
- Surface: Turf
- Track: Left-handed
- Qualification: Northern Hemisphere 4yo+ & Southern Hemisphere 3yo+
- Weight: SH 3yo: 54.5kg. NH & SH 4yo+: 57kg. Allowance fillies and mares 2kg
- Purse: US$6 million

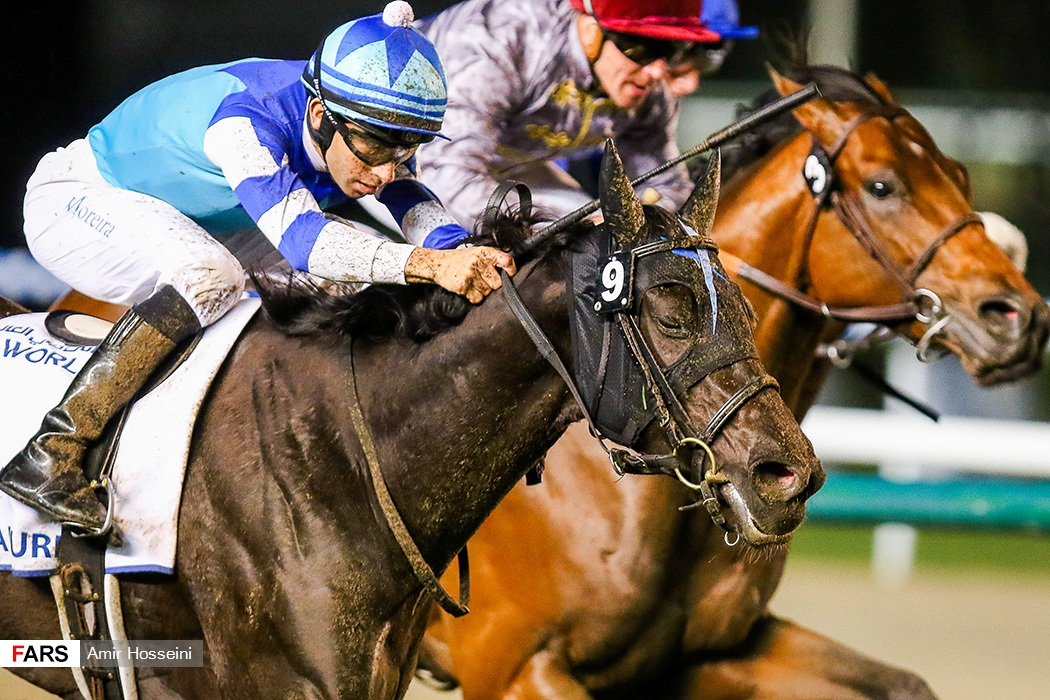
2017 Dubai World Cup

The Dubai Turf is a Group 1 flat horse race in the United Arab Emirates for four-year-old and above thoroughbreds run over a distance of 1,800 metres (1 mile 1 furlong) on the turf at Meydan Racecourse in Dubai during the Dubai World Cup Night in March.

== History ==
The race, initially named Dubai Duty Free, was first run in 1996 on dirt, with a distance of 2,000 metres (1 mile 2 furlongs). It was transferred to turf, and a distance of 1,777 metres, in 2000. The race attained Group 1 status in 2002. Between 1996 and 2009 it was run at Nad Al Sheba Racecourse. Since 2010 it has been run in Meydan, where it is run at 1,800 metres.

In 2006, the race became the second leg of the four race Asian Mile Challenge.

The race currently offers a purse of US$6 million, which places it and the Dubai Sheema Classic among the richest races on turf in the world.

In 2015, DP World signed a sponsorship agreement with Meydan Group and the race name was renamed to Dubai Turf.

== Records ==
Speed record: (at current distance of 1,800 metres and Meydan Racecourse)

- 1:45.52 – Just A Way (2014)

Most wins:

- 3 - Lord North (2021, 2022, 2023)

Most wins by a jockey:

- 4 – Frankie Dettori (1997, 2021, 2022, 2023)

Most wins by a trainer:

- 6 – Saeed bin Suroor (1997, 1998, 1999, 2000, 2013, 2018)

Most wins by an owner:

- 5 – Godolphin Racing (1997, 1998, 2013, 2018, 2026)

== Winners ==
Year	Winner	Age	Jockey	Trainer	Owner	Time
1996	Key of Luck (USA)	5	Gary Stevens (USA)	Kiaran McLaughlin (USA)	Saeed bin Maktoum Al Maktoum (UAE)	2:03.77
1997	Tamayaz (CAN)	5	Frankie Dettori (ITA)	Saeed bin Suroor (UAE)	Godolphin (UAE)	2:02.20
1998	Annus Mirabilis (FR)	6	Gary Stevens (USA)	Saeed bin Suroor (UAE)	Godolphin (UAE)	2:04.32
1999	Altibr (USA)	4	Richard Hills (GB)	Saeed bin Suroor (UAE)	Hamdan Al Maktoum (UAE)	2:00.79
2000	Rhythm Band (USA)	4	Ted Durcan (IRE)	Saeed bin Suroor (UAE)	Rashid Al Maktoum (UAE)	1:48.60
2001	Jim And Tonic (FR)	7	Gérald Mossé (FR)	François Doumen (FR)	John D. Martin (GB) & Roger Barby (GB)	1:47.83
2002	Terre a Terre (FR)	5	Christophe Soumillon (BEL)	Eric Libaud (FR)	Madame Henri Devin (FR) & Madame Biden Ashbrooke (FR)	1:48.75
2003	Ipi Tombe (ZWE)	4	Kevin Shea (SAF)	Mike de Kock (SAF)	Team Valor (USA), Sunmark Stable (SAF) & WinStar Farm (USA)	1:47.61
2004	Right Approach (GB) (dh)	5	Weichong Marwing (SAF)	Mike de Kock (SAF)	Bernard Kantor (SAF) et al.	1:49.36
2004	Paolini (GER) (dh)	7	Eduardo Pedroza (PAN)	Andreas Wöhler (GER)	Carde Ostermann-Richter (GER)	1:49.36
2005	Elvstroem (AUS)	5	Nash Rawiller (AUS)	Tony Vasil (AUS)	Elvstroem Syndicate (AUS)	1:50.54
2006	David Junior (USA)	4	Jamie Spencer (IRE)	Brian Meehan (IRE)	Roldvale Limited (WAL) & Gold Group International (GB)	1:49.65
2007	Admire Moon (JPN)	4	Yutaka Take (JPN)	Hiroyoshi Matsuda (JPN)	Riichi Kondo (JPN)	1:47.94
2008	Jay Peg (SAF)	5	Anton Marcus (SAF)	Herman Brown (SAF)	Marsh Shirtliff (SAF) et al.	1:46:20
2009	Gladiatorus (USA)	4	Ahmed Ajtebi (UAE)	Mubarak bin Shafya (UAE)	Mansoor Al Maktoum (UAE)	1:46.92
2010	Al Shemali (GB)	6	Royston Ffrench (GB)	Ali Rashid Al Raihe (UAE)	Mansoor Al Maktoum (UAE)	1:50.84
2011	Presvis (GB)	7	Ryan Moore (GB)	Luca Cumani (ITA)	Leonidas Marinopoulos (GRC)	1:50.21
2012	Cityscape (GB)	6	James Doyle (GB)	Roger Charlton (GB)	Khalid Abdullah (KSA)	1:48.65
2013	Sajjhaa (GB)	6	Silvestre de Sousa (BR)	Saeed bin Suroor (UAE)	Godolphin (UAE)	1:47.93
2014	Just A Way (JPN)	5	Yuichi Fukunaga (JPN)	Naosuke Sugai (JPN)	Akatsuki Yamatoya (JPN)	1:45.52
2015	Solow (GB)	5	Maxime Guyon (FR)	Freddy Head (FR)	Wertheimer et Frère (FR)	1:47.76
2016	Real Steel (JPN)	4	Ryan Moore (GB)	Yoshito Yahagi (JPN)	Sunday Racing (JPN)	1:47.13
2017	Vivlos (JPN)	4	João Moreira (BR)	Yasuo Tomomichi (JPN)	Kazuhiro Sasaki (JPN)	1:50.20
2018	Benbatl (GB)	4	Oisin Murphy (IRE)	Saeed bin Suroor (UAE)	Godolphin (UAE)	1:46.08
2019	Almond Eye (JPN)	4	Christophe Lemaire (FR)	Sakae Kunieda (JPN)	Silk Racing (JPN)	1:46.78
2020	Cancelled due to the COVID-19 pandemic.					
2021	Lord North (IRE)	5	Frankie Dettori (ITA)	John Gosden (GB)	Zayed bin Mohammed (UAE)	1:46.46
2022	Lord North (IRE) (dh)	6	Frankie Dettori (ITA)	John & Thady Gosden (GB)	Zayed bin Mohammed (UAE)	1:45.77
2022	Panthalassa (JPN) (dh)	5	Yutaka Yoshida (JPN)	Yoshito Yahagi (JPN)	Hiroo Race Co., Ltd. (JPN)	1:45.77
2023	Lord North (IRE)	7	Frankie Dettori (ITA)	John & Thady Gosden (GB)	Zayed bin Mohammed (UAE)	1:47.39
2024	Facteur Cheval (IRE)	5	Maxime Guyon (FR)	Jerome Reynier (FR)	Team Valor International (USA) & Gary Barber (SAF)	1:45.91
2025	Soul Rush (JPN)	7	Cristian Demuro (ITA)	Yasutoshi Ikee (JPN)	Tatsue Ishikawa (JPN)	1:45.84
2026	Ombudsman (IRE)	5	William Buick (GB)	John & Thady Gosden (GB)	Godolphin (UAE)	1:47.46

== Incidents ==
- 2024: Catnip (USA) broke down in the final furlong and had to be euthanized on the track. Jockey Christophe Lemaire was taken to the hospital for examination.

== See also ==
- List of United Arab Emirates horse races
