= Thomas P. Whitney =

American journalist

Thomas Porter Whitney (January 26, 1917 in Toledo, Ohio – December 2, 2007 in Manhattan, New York) was an American diplomat, author, translator, philanthropist and Thoroughbred racehorse owner/breeder.

== Biography ==
Born in Toledo, Ohio, Whitney graduated from Amherst College with a B.A. degree and went on graduate from Columbia University in 1940 with a Master's degree in Russian history. A translator of a number of works from Russian to English, Whitney is best known for translating the work of Nobel Prize winning author, Aleksandr Solzhenitsyn. Whitney also translated Petro Grigorenko's Memoirs and Yuri Orlov's Dangerous Thoughts.

He wrote a memoir titled Russia in My Life. First published in 1962 in New York City, it recounted the nine years he spent living in the Soviet Union at the close of the Joseph Stalin regime.

During World War II, Whitney worked as an analyst for the Office of Strategic Services in Washington, D.C. From 1944 to 1947, he served as an attaché and chief of the economic section at the United States embassy in Moscow. In 1947, he became the Moscow correspondent for The Associated Press and later was appointed head of the Moscow office.

Whitney donated important collections of Russian art and manuscripts to Amherst College, and established a center at the college for Russian studies.

A fan of Thoroughbred racing, as a hobby Whitney owned and raced several horses, most notably winning the Grade 1 Diana Handicap in 1983.
