= Horse Chestnut (horse) =

South African-bred Thoroughbred racehorse

- Sire: Fort Wood
- Grandsire: Sadler's Wells
- Dam: London Wall
- Damsire: Col Pickering
- Sex: Stallion
- Foaled: 1995
- Country: South Africa
- Colour: Chestnut
- Breeder: Harry F. Oppenheimer
- Owner: Harry & Bridget Oppenheimer
- Trainer: Michael de Kock
- Record: 10: 9-0-1
- Earnings: $474,036

Major wins
- Natal Free Handicap (1998); Graham Beck Handicap (1998); The Dingaans (1998); J&B Metropolitan Stakes (1999); South African Derby (1999); South African Classic (1999); Cape Argus Guineas (1999); Broward Handicap (2000)

Awards
- South African Horse of the Year (1999)

Honours
- Horse Chestnut Stakes Grade 1 (1600m) Turffontein

Horse Chestnut (19 August 1995 – 19 February 2015) was a champion thoroughbred racehorse bred in South Africa by Harry F. Oppenheimer at his Mauritzfontein Stud in Kimberley. His sire Fort Wood was a son of the British champion sire, Sadler's Wells. He was defeated once in his racing career of 10 starts. He was nominated as the first equine inductee into the South African Equine Hall of Fame in 2019 but lost the vote to Sea Cottage.

== Background ==
Horse Chestnut was raced by Oppenheimer and his wife, Bridget. The colt won the South African Triple Crown and was named both Horse of the Year and Champion 3-year-old Colt at three. He ran 10 races, winning 9 and placing 3rd once. Notable wins include the Grade 1 J&B Metropolitan Stakes over 2000m by 8¼ lengths, the Grade I South African Derby over 2450m by 10 lengths, and the Grade I South African Classic over 1800m by 4 lengths.

Sent to race in the United States, he won the Grade III Broward Handicap at Gulfstream Park in Hallandale Beach, Florida, over 1700m by five and a half lengths. During his preparation for the Grade I Donn Handicap, Horse Chestnut fractured a piece of his splint bone on his near foreleg, resulting in his early retirement from racing. The Oppenheimers subsequently sold the majority of shares in Horse Chestnut to Seth Hancock's Claiborne Farm in Kentucky, where he went to stud. He was subsequently purchased by the Horse Chestnut Syndicate and relocated back to South Africa in 2009 and stood at Drakenstein Farm Stud where he stood 6 seasons until his death. He has produced a number of stakes winners but nothing remotely comparable to himself.

Horse Chestnut died on 19 February 2015 in his stall at Drakenstein Stud in South Africa. Autopsy revealed that heart failure was the cause of his death.

== Tabulated race record ==
| At 2 | 3 starts 2 wins 1 third (South Africa) | 1997/98 |
| Won | Maiden Juvenile Plate (1000m Turffontein) by 5.75 lengths in 57:52 | 12/20/97 |
| 3rd | Morris Lipschitz Memorial Plate (Grade 3) (1200m Newmarket) beaten 1.75 lengths by Clifton King | 03/10/98 |
| Won | Kwazulu-Natal Free Handicap (Listed) (1200m Clairwood) by 2 lengths in race record time of 1:09:31 | 07/15/98 |
| At 3 | 6 starts 6 wins (South Africa) | 1998/99 |
| Won | Graham Beck Handicap (Listed) (1300m Gosforth Park) by 7 lengths from Pablo Zeta (gave 2.5 kg) | 10/24/98 |
| Won | The Dingaans (Grade 2) (1600m Turffontein) by 4.25 lengths from Pablo Zeta | 11/22/98 |
| Won | Cape Argus Guineas (Grade 1) (1600m Kenilworth) by 7.25 lengths from Pablo Zeta | 01/16/99 |
| Won | J&B Metropolitan Stakes (Grade 1) (2000m Kenilworth) by 8 lengths from the year older Classic Flag (gave 5.5 kg) | 02/06/99 |
| Won | South African Classic (Grade 1) (1800m Gosforth Park) by 3.75 lengths | 03/27/99 |
| Won | South African Derby (Grade 1) (2450m Turffontein) by 9.5 lengths | 04/24/99 |
| At 4 | 1 start 1 win (United States) | 2000 |
| Won | Broward Handicap (Grade 3) (1700m Gulfstream Park) by 5.5 lengths | 01/08/00 |

== See also ==
- List of leading Thoroughbred racehorses
