= Team Valor International =

Thoroughbred horse racing operation

Coordinates: 38.130329°N 84.78349°W

Team Valor Stable LLC is an American Thoroughbred horse racing stable based in Lake Worth, Florida. It was founded by Barry Irwin and Jeff Siegel who create partnerships (syndicates) with racing enthusiasts to race Thoroughbred horses at major racing venues, primarily in North America.

In early July 2007, Barry Irwin acquired the equity position held by Jeff Siegel and changed the name of the operation to Team Valor International.

In keeping with the new name, Team Valor became more internationally focused as Irwin proposed to seek out more excellent stock abroad, having proven earlier that it could be just as lucrative and exciting as finding runners in North America.

In 2011, Team Valor's colt Animal Kingdom, who was also bred by Barry Irwin, won the Kentucky Derby. At the age of five, Team Valor's Animal Kingdom won the world's richest race, The Dubai World Cup, with a total purse of $10 Million.

In the ten years in which North American-based Racing Partnership statistics have been kept, Team Valor International has been the Leading Partnership by number of stakes races won in the years 2009, 2010, 2011, 2012, 2013 and 2018.

== International champions ==
Under the guidance of stable manager Barry Irwin, the racing stable has campaigned 22 International Champions and Highweights, including:

- Ipi Tombe (Zimbabwe) -- Horse of the Year in the UAE
- Sweet Stream (Italy) -- Top-weighted Staying Mare at age 5 in England
- Animal Kingdom (USA) -- Champion Colt at age 3 in USA, Champion Older Horse in Dubai
- Free At Last (USA) -- Champion Colt at age 2 in Canada
- Added Edge (USA) -- Champion Colt at 2 in Canada
- Axana (Germany) -- Champion Miler at 3 in Germany
- Becrux (Italy) -- Champion Colt at 2 in Italy
- New Collection (Italy) -- Champion Filly at 2 in Italy
- Carnadore (South Africa) -- Champion Colt at 2 in South Africa
- Russian Sage (South Africa) -- Champion Colt at 3 in South Africa
- Captain's Lover (South Africa) -- Champion Filly at 3 in South Africa
- Irridescence (South Africa) -- Champion Filly at 3 in South Africa
- Technician (France) -- Champion Stayer at 3 in France
- Torgau (Ireland) -- Cartier Racing Award in England, top-weighted 2yo filly in Ireland
- La Petite Coco (Ireland) -- Top-weighted Older Mare in Ireland
- Star of Cozzene (USA) -- Top-weighted 3yo colt on turf in USA
- Political Ambition (USA) -- Top-weighted 3yo colt on turf in USA
- Prized (USA) -- Top-weighted 3yo colt on turf in USA
- Va Bank (Ireland) -- Top-weighted Older Horse in Poland, Top-weighted Older Horse in Germany, Top-weighted Older Horse in Italy
- Love 'N' Happiness (Brazil) -- Champion Filly at 2 in Brazil
- Juno (Brazil) -- Champion Filly at 2 in Brazil
- Brigantin (USA) -- Champion Colt at 3 in Switzerland

Regional champions to race for Team Valor include:

- Prized (USA) -- Horse of the Year and Champion 3yo Colt in Florida
- Cashier's Dream (USA) -- Horse of the Year in Michigan
- Thomas Jo (USA) -- Horse of the Year and Champion 3yo in Texas
- King of the Roxy (USA) -- Horse of the Year and Outstanding 3yo Colt in Ohio
- Green Up (USA) -- Horse of the Year and Champion 3yo Filly in Virginia
- Golden Ballet (USA) -- Champion Filly at 3 in California
- Le Grande Danseur (USA) -- Champion Colt at 2 in New York
- Royal Pleasure (South Africa) -- Champion Filly at 2 in Kwa-Zulu-Natal region SAF
- Sally Bowles (South Africa) -- Champion Filly at 2 in Kwa-Zulu-Natal region SAF
- Stratos (South Africa) -- Champion Older Mare in Highveld region SAF
- Ebony Flyer (South Africa) -- Champion Filly at 3 in Eastern Cape region SAF
- Brave Mary (South Africa) -- Horse of the Year in Kwa-Zulu-Natal region, Champion Filly at 2 in Kwa-Zulu-Natal region (South Africa)
- Anna Pavlova (South Africa) -- Champion Filly at 3 in Kwa-Zulu-Natal region, Champion Filly Sprinter in Kwa-Zulu-Natal region (South Africa)

Team Valor has campaigned 33 individual Grade 1 winners around the globe:

- Animal Kingdom (USA and UAE)
- Becrux (Italy)
- Capla Temptress (Canada)
- Captain Bodgit (USA)
- Captain's Lover (South Africa)
- Carnadore (South Africa)
- Cashier's Dream (USA)
- Ebony Flyer (South Africa)
- Euro Charline (USA)
- Facteur Cheval (UAE)
- Gitano Hernando (USA)
- Golden Ballet (USA)
- Gypsy's Warning (USA)
- Ipi Tombe (Zimbabwe and South Africa)
- Irridescence (South Africa and Hong Kong)
- La Petite Coco (Ireland)
- Little Miss Magic (South Africa)
- Love 'N' Happiness (Brazil)
- Martial Law (United Kingdom)
- Oleksandra (USA)
- On Her Toes (South Africa)
- Political Ambition (USA)
- Prized (USA)
- Russian Sage (South Africa)
- Star of Cozzene (USA)
- Stratos (South Africa)
- Summer Soiree (USA)
- Sweet Stream (France)
- Technician (France)
- The Deputy (USA)
- Unbridled Belle (USA)
- Visionaire (USA)
- U. S. S. Valor (USA)

== Graded races ==
International Grade 1 victories earned by Team Valor runners include:

- Allan Robertson Stakes (South Africa)
- Arlington Million (USA)
- Beldame Stakes (USA)
- Breeders Cup Turf (USA)
- Cape Fillies Guineas (South Africa)
- Champagne Stakes (USA)
- Daily News 2000 Stakes (South Africa)
- Del Mar Oaks (USA)
- Dubai Duty Free Stakes (UAE)
- Dubai Turf (UAE)
- Dubai World Cup (UAE)
- Queen Elizabeth II Cup (Hong Kong)
- Empress Club Stakes (South Africa) (Twice)
- Florida Derby (USA)
- Golden Medallion (South Africa)
- Goodwood Stakes (USA)
- Hollywood Derby (USA)
- Hollywood Invitational Turf Handicap (USA)
- Gran Premio Immensity (Brazil)
- Jaipur Handicap (USA)
- Kentucky Derby (USA)
- King's Bishop Stakes (USA)
- Las Virgenes Stakes (USA)
- Majorca Stakes (South Africa)
- Man o' War Stakes (USA)
- Matriarch Stakes (USA)
- Molson Export Million (Canada)
- Natalma Stakes (Canada)
- Pretty Polly Stakes (Ireland)
- Prix Royal-Oak (France)
- SA Fillies Classic (South Africa) (twice)
- SA Fillies Sprint (South Africa)
- San Luis Rey Stakes (USA)
- Santa Anita Derby (USA)
- Santa Anita Handicap (USA)
- Santa Anita Oaks (USA)
- Spinaway Stakes (USA)
- Prix Vermeille (France)
- Woodbine Mile (Canada)
- Woolavington Stakes (South Africa)

== Racing Around the Globe ==
Barry Irwin's stable, Team Valor International, is a global venture. The stable has campaigned winners in the following locations:

- USA
- UAE
- United Kingdom
- Canada
- Ireland
- France
- Germany
- Italy
- Austria
- Switzerland
- Saudi Arabia
- South Africa
- Hong Kong
- Japan
- Brazil
- Uruguay
- South Korea
- Zimbabwe
