= Monterosso (horse) =

British-bred Thoroughbred racehorse

- Sire: Dubawi
- Grandsire: Dubai Millennium
- Dam: Porto Roca
- Damsire: Barathea
- Sex: Stallion
- Foaled: 14 February 2007
- Country: United Kingdom
- Colour: Bay
- Breeder: Darley Stud
- Owner: Sheikh Hamdan Bin Mohammed Al Maktoum; Godolphin Racing
- Trainer: Mark Johnston; Mahmoud Al Zarooni
- Record: 16: 7-2-1
- Earnings: £4,780,239 (1 April 2012)

Major wins
- King Edward VII Stakes (2010); Dubai City of Gold (2011); Dubai World Cup (2012)

Monterosso (foaled 2007) is a British-bred Thoroughbred racehorse. He was originally trained in Britain, where he won three handicap races and the King Edward VII Stakes as a three-year-old in 2010. After being moved to the United Arab Emirates he recorded his most important success when he won the Dubai World Cup on 31 March 2012.

== Background ==
Monterosso, a dark-coated bay horse with a white sock on his right hind foot, was bred in England by Sheikh Mohammed bin Rashid Al Maktoum's Darley Stud. He was originally registered as being owned by Sheikh Mohammed's son Hamdan bin Mohammed Al Maktoum and was sent into training with Mark Johnston at Middleham, North Yorkshire.

Monterosso's sire, Dubawi won the Irish 2,000 Guineas and the Prix Jacques Le Marois before going on to a successful stud career, siring winners including Makfi (2000 Guineas) and Poet's Voice (Queen Elizabeth II Stakes). His dam, Porto Roca, was a successful Australian racehorse, winning the Coolmore Classic in 2001.

== Racing career ==
=== 2009–2010: early career ===
Monterosso began his racing career by finishing unplaced in a maiden race on the Polytrack surface at Wolverhampton Racecourse in November 2009. In the winter he was campaigned on the all-weather track at Lingfield, finishing second in a maiden on 15 January and then recording his first win in a similar event eight days later. On 6 February he carried top weight of 133 pounds and won a one-mile handicap race at the same venue.

Monterosso contested his first turf race in April when he won the Cock of the North Handicap at Ripon by a neck from the filly Eleanora Duse, a subsequent Group Two winner. After finishing second to Green Moon in the London Gold Cup (Johnston felt he had been unlucky) he was a comfortable winner of a handicap at Newmarket under top weight of 130 pounds. His performances since the start of the year had seen his official rating improve from 78 to 104, and he was thereafter campaigned in Group Races.

At Royal Ascot, Monterosso contested the Group Two King Edward VII Stakes over 1 1/2 miles. Ridden by Frankie Dettori, he took the lead early in the straight and "quickened clear" to win by two and a quarter lengths from the subsequent St Leger winner Arctic Cosmos, with The Derby runner-up At First Sight in fourth place. Monterosso's continuing improvement resulted in his owners paying €150,000 to supplement the horse into the Irish Derby at the Curragh on 27 June. He started 3/1 favourite for the race, but was never able to reach the lead and finished fourth to Cape Blanco. Monterosso was again made favourite in the Deutsches Derby three weeks later, but finished seventh behind Buzzword. He returned to England for the Great Voltigeur Stakes at York in August but was "never a factor" and finished fifth of the ten runners behind Rewilding.

At the end of the 2010 season, Monterosso's ownership was transferred to the Maktoum family's Godolphin Racing operation and he was sent to Dubai to be trained by Mahmoud Al Zarooni. Another of Johnston's best three-year-olds, a chestnut named Capponi, also made the move.

=== 2011: four-year-old season ===
On his first start for his new trainer, Monterosso contested the Group Two Dubai City of Gold over 12 1/2 furlongs on turf at Meydan Racecourse. Ridden for the first time by Mickael Barzalona he took the lead in the straight and won by one and a quarter lengths from his stable companion Calvados Blues. Monterosso was then brought back in distance to ten furlongs and switched to tapeta for the world's most valuable race, the Dubai World Cup. Starting as a 40/1 outsider he tracked the leaders and stayed on well in the closing stages to finish third, beaten half a length and a neck by the Japanese runners Victoire Pisa and Transcend. Monterosso missed the rest of the 2011 season after contracting colic.

=== 2012: five-year-old season ===
After a break of more than eleven months, Monterosso returned to the racecourse for the third round of the Al Maktoum Challenge at Meydan on 10 March. He finished fourth of the fourteen runners, 6 1/2 lengths behind his stable companion Capponi. For his second attempt at the Dubai World Cup, Monterosso started at odds of 20/1 against twelve opponents on the evening of 31 March. Barzalona settled the horse in the middle of the field before moving strongly through to dispute the lead in the straight. He overtook Capponi 1 1/2 furlongs from the finish and drew clear to win "comfortably" by three lengths. As he had done when winning the Epsom Derby on Pour Moi, Barzalona celebrated before the finish by standing up in his stirrups and waving his whip to the crowd. After the race the Godolphin spokesman Simon Crisford announced that Monterosso and Capponi would return to England for the rest of the European flat season, although a run in the Singapore Airlines International Cup was also being considered.

Monterosso made his next appearance in the Eclipse Stakes at Sandown on 7 July. He tracked the leaders and briefly reached third place in the straight but faded in the closing stages to finish eighth of the nine runners behind Nathaniel.

=== 2013: six-year-old season ===
Monterosso returned to Dubai in the winter of 2012/2013 but made only one appearance in the 2013 season. On 9 March he finished tenth of the twelve runners in the third round of the Al Maktoum Challenge.

== Pedigree ==
Pedigree of Monterosso (GB), bay horse, 2007
Sire Dubawi (IRE) 2002	Dubai Millennium; 1996	Seeking the Gold	Mr. Prospector
Sire Dubawi (IRE) 2002	Dubai Millennium; 1996	Seeking the Gold	Con Game
Sire Dubawi (IRE) 2002	Dubai Millennium; 1996	Colorado Dancer	Shareef Dancer
Sire Dubawi (IRE) 2002	Dubai Millennium; 1996	Colorado Dancer	Fall Aspen
Sire Dubawi (IRE) 2002	Zomaradah; 1995	Deploy	Shirley Heights
Sire Dubawi (IRE) 2002	Zomaradah; 1995	Deploy	Slightly Dangerous
Sire Dubawi (IRE) 2002	Zomaradah; 1995	Jawaher	Dancing Brave
Sire Dubawi (IRE) 2002	Zomaradah; 1995	Jawaher	High Tern
Dam Porto Roca (AUS) 1995	Barathea; 1990	Sadler's Wells	Northern Dancer
Dam Porto Roca (AUS) 1995	Barathea; 1990	Sadler's Wells	Fairy Bridge
Dam Porto Roca (AUS) 1995	Barathea; 1990	Brocade	Habitat
Dam Porto Roca (AUS) 1995	Barathea; 1990	Brocade	Canton Silk
Dam Porto Roca (AUS) 1995	Antelliere; 1986	Salieri	Accipiter
Dam Porto Roca (AUS) 1995	Antelliere; 1986	Salieri	Hogan's Sister
Dam Porto Roca (AUS) 1995	Antelliere; 1986	Anntelle	Loosen Up
Dam Porto Roca (AUS) 1995	Antelliere; 1986	Anntelle	Soft Quest (Family: 28)
