= Turffontein Racecourse =

Racecourse in South Africa

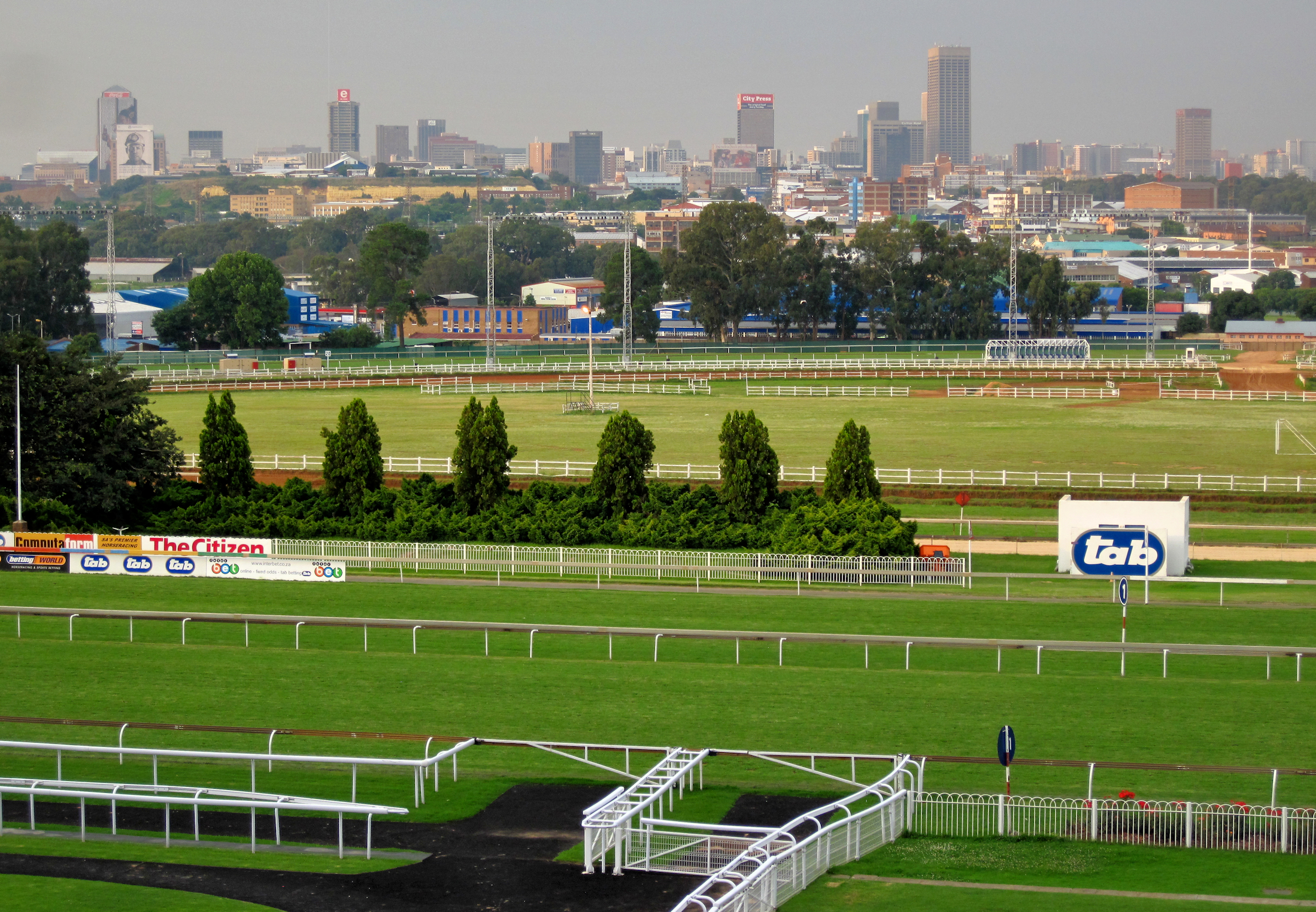
- Interactive map of Turffontein Racecourse
- Location: Johannesburg, South Africa
- Coordinates: 26°14′17″S 28°2′49″E

Turffontein Racecourse is a race track in South Africa for Thoroughbred horse racing founded in 1887 at Turffontein, Gauteng by the Johannesburg Turf Club. The facility has both an inner and outer grass track.

The racecourse is host to the Group One South African Derby and November's Summer Cup.

Turffontein is widely acknowledged as a true test of stamina for races contested around the bend due to the climb from the 1200 metre mark to the final turn.

The venue consists of two separate tracks, the main "Standside" track and a slightly shorter "Inside" track that runs inside it.
