= Kevin Shea (jockey) =

South African jockey (born 1964)

Personal information
- Born: 16 April 1963 (age 63) Durban, South Africa
- Occupation: Jockey

Horse racing career
- Sport: Horse racing
- Career wins: 2000+

Major racing wins
- Durban July Handicap (2002, 2008); Dubai Duty Free (2003); Queen Elizabeth II Cup (2008); Hong Kong Cup (2008); Dubai Sheema Classic (2008); Jebel Hatta (2012)

Significant horses
- Ipi Tombe, Lizard's Desire, Dancers Daughter, Sun Classique, Via Africa
- Updated on 29 April 2012

Kevin Shea (born 16 April 1964) is a former South African horse racing jockey. He was a former stable jockey for trainer Mike de Kock, and rode 26 Grade 1 winners for the trainer.

His career lasted 37 years, before retiring in 2015 after experiencing chronic back problems. He is currently an on-course presenter for Gold Circle TV which covers horse racing in KwaZulu-Natal.

== Early life ==
Shea attended Northlands High School, before enrolling into the South African Jockey Academy in 1977.

== Early career ==
Shea's first winner as an apprentice came in 1979, onboard DRUID'S ROBE for trainer Des Rich. He would go onto ride 100 winners as an apprentice.

== Major wins ==
South Africa

He is a two-time winner of the Vodacom Durban July. His first victory coming on board the filly Ipi Tombe for trainer Mike de Kock in 2002. His second July victory came in 2008 when he dead-heated for first with Dancers Daughter for the Justin Snaith stable.

Shea won the Summer Cup four times. His first win came in 1982 while still an apprentice, on board the filly 'Have A Fling' for trainer Buller Benton (the race then was known as the Holiday Inns).

International

Shea has ridden winners in UAE (Dubai), Hong Kong, Mauritius and Singapore. His list of international feature wins include the Dubai Duty Free (Ipi Tombe, 2003), Sheema Classic (Sun Classique, 2008), QEII Cup (Archipenko, 2008), Hong Kong Cup (2008), Singapore Cup (2010) and Jebel Hatta (2003,2012).

== South African Colours ==
Shea represented South Africa in the International Jockeys’ Challenge in November 2008, which took place at Turffontein.

== Feature Winners ==
Here is a list of Grade 1 wins by Kevin Shea.

Year	Race	Country	Horse	Trainer	Jockey
1982	Summer Cup	(South Africa)	Have A Fling	Buller Benton	Kevin Shea
2001	Champions Cup	(South Africa)	Ingleside	Mike de Kock	Kevin Shea
2001	Summer Cup	(South Africa)	Ingleside	Mike de Kock	Kevin Shea
2002	Paddock Stakes	(South Africa)	Escoleta Fitz	Mike de Kock	Kevin Shea
2002	Cape Guineas	(South Africa)	Flight Alert	Mike de Kock	Kevin Shea
2002	Woolavington Cup	(South Africa)	Ipi Tombe	Mike de Kock	Kevin Shea
2002	Durban July	(South Africa)	Ipi Tombe	Mike de Kock	Kevin Shea
2002	Garden Province Stakes	(South Africa)	Escoleta Fitz	Mike de Kock	Kevin Shea
2003	Cape Guineas	(South Africa)	Domino Man	Mike de Kock	Kevin Shea
2003	Dubai Duty Free	(United Arab Emirates)	Ipi Tombe	Mike de Kock	Kevin Shea
2003	Summer Cup	(South Africa)	Wolf Whistle	Mike de Kock	Kevin Shea
2003	Cape Fillies Guineas	(South Africa)	Emerald Beauty	Mike de Kock	Kevin Shea
2004	SA Classic	(South Africa)	Greys Inn	Mike de Kock	Kevin Shea
2004	Daily News	(South Africa)	Grand Emporium	Weiho Marwing	Kevin Shea
2006	Horse Chestnut 1600	(South Africa)	Ilha Da Vitoria	Mike de Kock	Kevin Shea
2008	Sheema Classic	(United Arab Emirates)	Sun Classique	Mike de Kock	Kevin Shea
2008	QEII Cup	(Hong Kong)	Archipenko	Mike de Kock	Kevin Shea
2008	Vodacom Durban July	(South Africa)	Dancer's Daughter (DH)	Justin Snaith	Kevin Shea
2008	Premiers Champion Stakes	(South Africa)	Rocks Off	Mike de Kock	Kevin Shea
2008	Summer Cup	(South Africa)	Rudra	Mike de Kock	Kevin Shea
2008	Hong Kong Cup	(Hong Kong)	Eagle Mountain	Mike de Kock	Kevin Shea
2009	Woolavington Stakes	(South Africa)	Zirconeum	Mike de Kock	Kevin Shea
2010	SA Derby	(South Africa)	Irish Flame	Mike de Kock	Kevin Shea
2010	Singapore Cup	(Singapore)	Lizard's Desire	Mike de Kock	Kevin Shea
2010	Daily News	(South Africa)	Irish Flame	Mike de Kock	Kevin Shea
2010	Canon Gold Cup	(South Africa)	Ancestral Fore	Mike de Kock	Kevin Shea
2010	Golden Slipper	(South Africa)	Mahbooba	Mike de Kock	Kevin Shea
2011	Thekwini Stakes	(South Africa)	Amanee	Mike de Kock	Kevin Shea
2012	Jebel Hatta	(United Arab Emirates)	Masterofhounds (USA)	Mike de Kock	Kevin Shea
2012	Golden Horse Medallion	(South Africa)	Rocket Let Win	Dennis Drier	Kevin Shea
2013	Golden Horseshoe	(South Africa)	Forest Indigo	Alec Laird	Kevin Shea
2014	Cape Flying Championship	(South Africa)	Via Africa	Duncan Howells	Kevin Shea
2014	SA Fillies Classic	(South Africa)	Athina	Joe Soma	Kevin Shea
2014	SA Fillies Sprint	(South Africa)	Via Africa	Duncan Howells	Kevin Shea
2014	Thekwini Stakes	(South Africa)	Same Jurisdiction	Duncan Howells	Kevin Shea
