= South African Derby =

- Class: Group I
- Location: Turffontein Racecourse; Johannesburg, South Africa
- Inaugurated: 1907
- Race type: Flat / Thoroughbred
- Website: Durban July history

Race information
- Distance: 2450 meters (12.50 furlongs)
- Surface: Turf
- Track: Right-handed
- Qualification: Three-year-old

The South African Derby is a Group I stakes race for three-year-old Thoroughbred horses, held annually in Johannesburg, South Africa.

== Winners ==
- 1907 Diana
- 1908 Fillette
- 1909 Adair
- 1910 Desert Queen
- 1911 Devinco
- 1912 Van Raalte
- 1913 Eiffel Tower
- 1914 Water Baby
- 1915 Blanche
- 1916 Matrimony
- 1917 Noble Lady
- 1918 Contentment
- 1919 Grenade
- 1920 Colesberg
- 1921 Dignitary
- 1922 Antonio
- 1923 Red Ronald
- 1924 Catalan
- 1925 Channel Isle
- 1926 Asteroid
- 1927 Just
- 1928 Step Aside
- 1929 The Sun
- 1930 Historian
- 1931 Meteros
- 1932 Mussoulini
- 1933 Sunnite
- 1934 Night Storm
- 1935 Moonlit
- 1936 Stormont
- 1937 Junior
- 1938 Hunting Ground
- 1939 Yale
- 1940 Lenin
- 1941 Stonewall
- 1942 Cropper
- 1943 Burning Daylight
- 1944 Cape Heath
- 1945 Donate
- 1946 Danny Boy
- 1947 Fire Brigade
- 1948 Magic Carpet
- 1949 Restore
- 1950 Dancing Flame
- 1951 River Ferry
- 1952 Beacon Light
- 1953 Strath Pearl
- 1954 Nagaina Hall
- 1955 Radical
- 1956 Preacher
- 1957 Tiger Fish
- 1958 Hengist
- 1959 Airy Elf
- 1960 Open Sea
- 1961 Carlisle
- 1962 Hifrac
- 1963 Ptolemy
- 1964 King Willow
- 1965 Bridesman
- 1966 Appointment
- 1967 Bill Bailey
- 1968 Home Guard
- 1969 Lightning Path
- 1971 Pedlar
- 1972 Elevation
- 1973 Riboville
- 1974 Bright Future
- 1975 Distinctly
- 1976 Black Bishop
- 1977 Tribesman
- 1978 Welcome Boy
- 1979 Artistry
- 1980 Smuggler's Den
- 1981 Secret Service
- 1982 Oakland Bay
- 1983 Kwiktan
- 1984 Sandfly
- 1985 Be Noble (NZ)
- 1986 Potomac (ARG)
- 1987 Pedometer
- 1988 Debonair Duke
- 1989 Kadarko
- 1990 Topa Inca
- 1991 Sacred Jungle
- 1992 Launching Pad
- 1993 Hidden Fortune
- 1994 The Monk
- 1995 Travel North
- 1996 Super Quality
- 1997 North by Northwest
- 1998 Kale
- 1999 Horse Chestnut
- 2000 Silver Sliver
- 2001 Badger's Drift
- 2002 Timber Trader (NZ)
- 2003 Yard Arm
- 2004 Grey's Inn (USA)
- 2005 Silverpoint (AUS)
- 2006 Elusive Fort
- 2007 Ravishing
- 2008 King's Gambit
- 2009 Bouquet-Garni
- 2010 Irish Flame
- 2011 Seal
- 2012 Pomodoro, Royal Bencher
- 2013 Wylie Hall
- 2014 Louis The King
- 2015 Legal Eagle
- 2016 Abashiri
- 2017 Al Sahem
- 2018 Hero's Honour
- 2019 Samurai Warrior
- 2020 Out Of Your League
- 2021 Malmoos
- 2022 Aragosta
- 2023 Son Of Raj
