= Weichong Marwing =

South African jockey

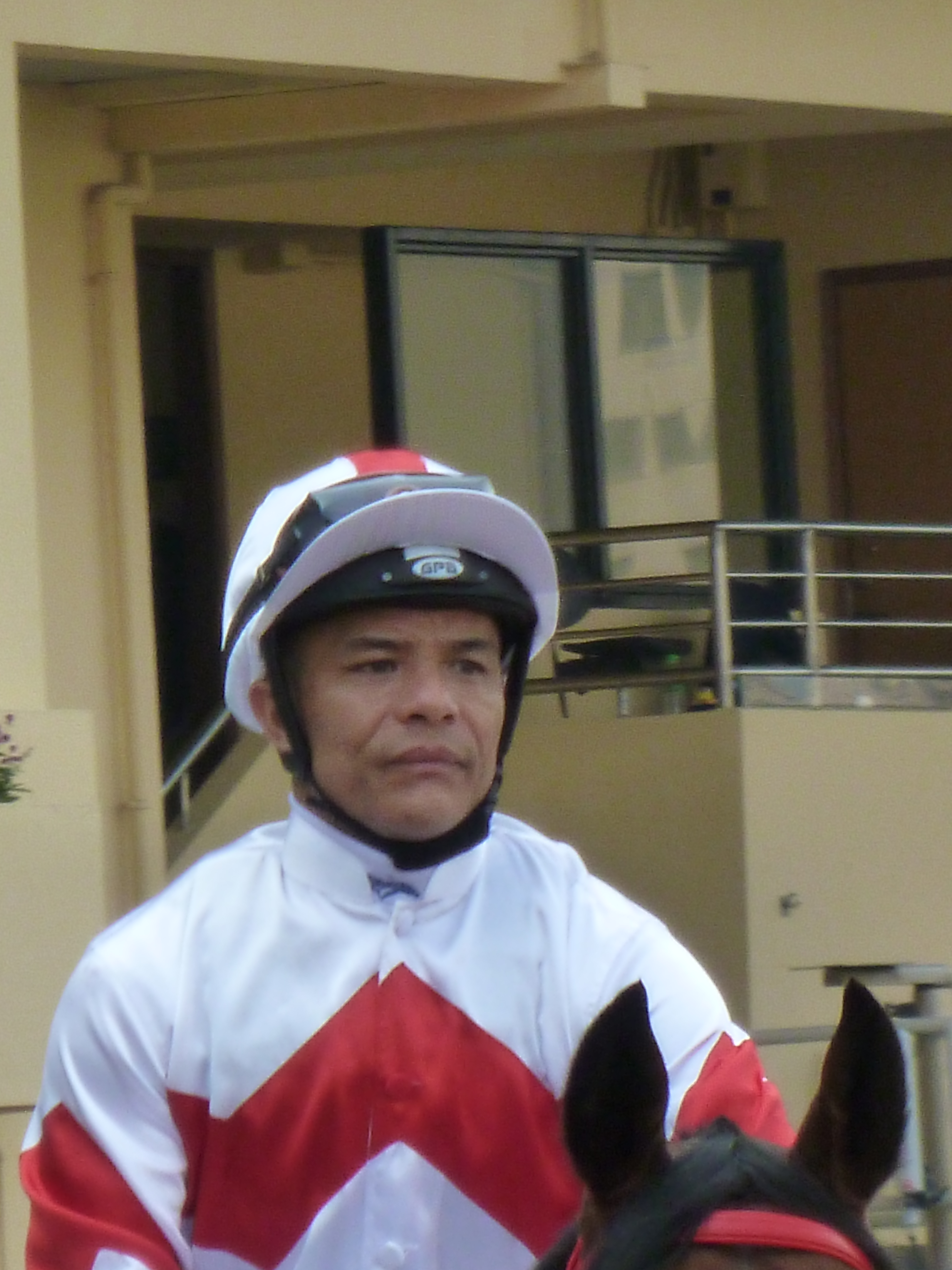

Personal information
- Born: 14 March 1970 (age 56) South Africa
- Occupation: Jockey

Horse racing career
- Sport: Horse racing
- Career wins: ongoing

Major racing wins
- Champions Mile (2002); Hong Kong Derby (2002); Hong Kong Mile (2002); Hong Kong Gold Cup (2003); Dubai Duty Free Stakes (2004); UAE Derby (2004, 2007); Godolphin Mile (2005); Queen Elizabeth II Cup (2006)

Significant horses
- Yard-Arm, Olympic Express, Asiatic Boy
- Updated on 7 April 2007

Weichong C. Marwing (born 14 March 1970 in South Africa) is a Thoroughbred horse racing jockey. Based in South Africa, he has won a number of important international Group One races. He is well remembered for riding Irridescence to victory over the great Ouija Board in the 2006 Queen Elizabeth II Cup at Sha Tin Racecourse in Hong Kong. In 2007, for trainer Mike De Kock he won his second United Arab Emirates Derby at Nad Al Sheba Racecourse aboard Asiatic Boy, a horse he says is the best he has ever ridden.

His brother, Weiho Marwing, is also involved in Thoroughbred racing and is a trainer in South Africa.
