= Hong Kong Champion Middle-distance Horse =

The Hong Kong Champion Middle-distance Horse is an honour given in Hong Kong thoroughbred horse racing. It is awarded annually by the Hong Kong Jockey Club (HKJC). The honour is part of the Hong Kong Jockey Club Champion Awards and is awarded at the end of the Hong Kong season in July.

== Winners ==
Year	Horse	Age	Bred	Trainer	Owner
1998/1999	Indigenous	6	Ireland	Ivan Allan	Mr & Mrs Pang Yuen Hing
1999/2000	Industrialist	4	Great Britain	Brian P. C. Kan	Albert Hu Si Nok & Peter Wong Yau Ming
2000/2001	Industrial Pioneer	4	Ireland	Brian Kan Ping-chee	Albert Hu Si Nok
2001/2002	Olympic Express	4	United Kingdom	Ivan Allen	Larry Yung
2002/2003	Precision	5	France	David Oughton	Wu Sai Wing
2003/2004	River Dancer	5	Ireland	John Size	R J Arculli
2004/2005	Vengeance of Rain	4	New Zealand	David Ferraris	Chow Chu May Ping
2005/2006	Vengeance of Rain	5	New Zealand	David Ferraris	Chow Chu May Ping
2006/2007	Viva Pataca	5	United Kingdom	John Moore	Stanley Ho Hung Sun
2007/2008	Viva Pataca	6	United Kingdom	John Moore	Stanley Ho Hung Sun
2008/2009	Viva Pataca	7	United Kingdom	John Moore	Stanley Ho Hung Sun
2009/2010	Collection	5	Ireland	John Moore	John Moore Trainer Syndicate
2010/2011	Ambitious Dragon	4	New Zealand	A T Millard	Johnson Lam Pui Hung
2011/2012	Ambitious Dragon	5	New Zealand	A T Millard	Johnson Lam Pui Hung
2012/2013	Military Attack	5	Ireland	John Moore	Steven Lo Kit Sing
2013/2014	Designs On Rome	4	Ireland	John Moore	Cheng Keung Fai
2014/2015	Designs On Rome	5	Ireland	John Moore	Cheng Keung Fai
2015/2016	Werther	4	New Zealand	John Moore	Johnson Chen
2016/2017	Rapper Dragon	5	Australia	John Moore	Albert Hung
2017/2018	Time Warp	5	Great Britain	Anthony S. Cruz	Martin Siu Kim Sun
2018/2019	Exultant	5	Ireland	Anthony S. Cruz	Eddie Wong Ming Chak & Wong Leung Sau Hing
2019/2020	Exultant	6	Ireland	Anthony S. Cruz	Eddie Wong Ming Chak & Wong Leung Sau Hing
2020/2021	Golden Sixty	5	Australia	Francis Lui Kin Wai	Stanley Chan Ka Leung
2021/2022	Romantic Warrior	4	Ireland	Danny Shum Chap Shing	Peter Lau Pak Fai
2022/2023	Romantic Warrior	5	Ireland	Danny Shum Chap Shing	Peter Lau Pak Fai
2023/2024	Romantic Warrior	6	Ireland	Danny Shum Chap Shing	Peter Lau Pak Fai
2024/2025	Romantic Warrior	7	Ireland	Danny Shum Chap Shing	Peter Lau Pak Fai
