= Hong Kong Champion Stayer =

The Hong Kong Champion Stayer is an honour given in Hong Kong thoroughbred horse racing. It is awarded annually by the Hong Kong Jockey Club (HKJC). The honour is part of the Hong Kong Jockey Club Champion Awards and is awarded at the end of the Hong Kong season in July.

== Winners since 2001 ==
Year	Horse	Age	Bred	Trainer	Owner
2000/2001	Oriental Express	8	Ireland	Ivan Allen	Larry Yung
2001/2002	Cheers Hong Kong	5	France	Ivan Allen	Tuesday Club Syndicate
2002/2003	Precision	5	France	David Oughton	Wu Sai Wing
2003/2004	Super Kid	5	New Zealand	John Size	Wong Yuk Kwan
2004/2005	Vengeance of Rain	4	New Zealand	David Ferraris	Chow Chu May Ping
2005/2006	Viva Pataca	4	United Kingdom	John Moore	Stanley Ho Hung Sun
2006/2007	Vengeance of Rain	6	New Zealand	David Ferraris	Chow Chu May Ping
2007/2008	Viva Pataca	6	United Kingdom	John Moore	Stanley Ho Hung Sun
2008/2009	Viva Pataca	7	United Kingdom	John Moore	Stanley Ho Hung Sun
2009/2010	Mr Medici	5	Ireland	L Ho	Allen Shi Lop Tak
2010/2011	Mighty High	5	France	John Moore	Albert Hung Chao Hong
2011/2012	Liberator	5	Australia	David Ferraris	David Ferraris Trainer Syndicate
2012/2013	California Memory	7	United States	Anthony S. Cruz	Howard Liang Yum Shing
2013/2014	Dominant	6	Ireland	John Moore	10/11 John Moore Trainer Syndicate
2014/2015	Helene Super Star	5	USA	Anthony S. Cruz	Wilson Woo Ka Wah et al.
2015/2016	Blazing Speed	7	United Kingdom	Anthony S. Cruz	Fentons Racing Syndicate
2016/2017	Werther	5	New Zealand	John Moore	Johnson Chen
2017/2018	Pakistan Star	5	Germany	Anthony S. Cruz	Kerm Din
