= Hong Kong Gold Cup =

Citi Hong Kong Gold Cup
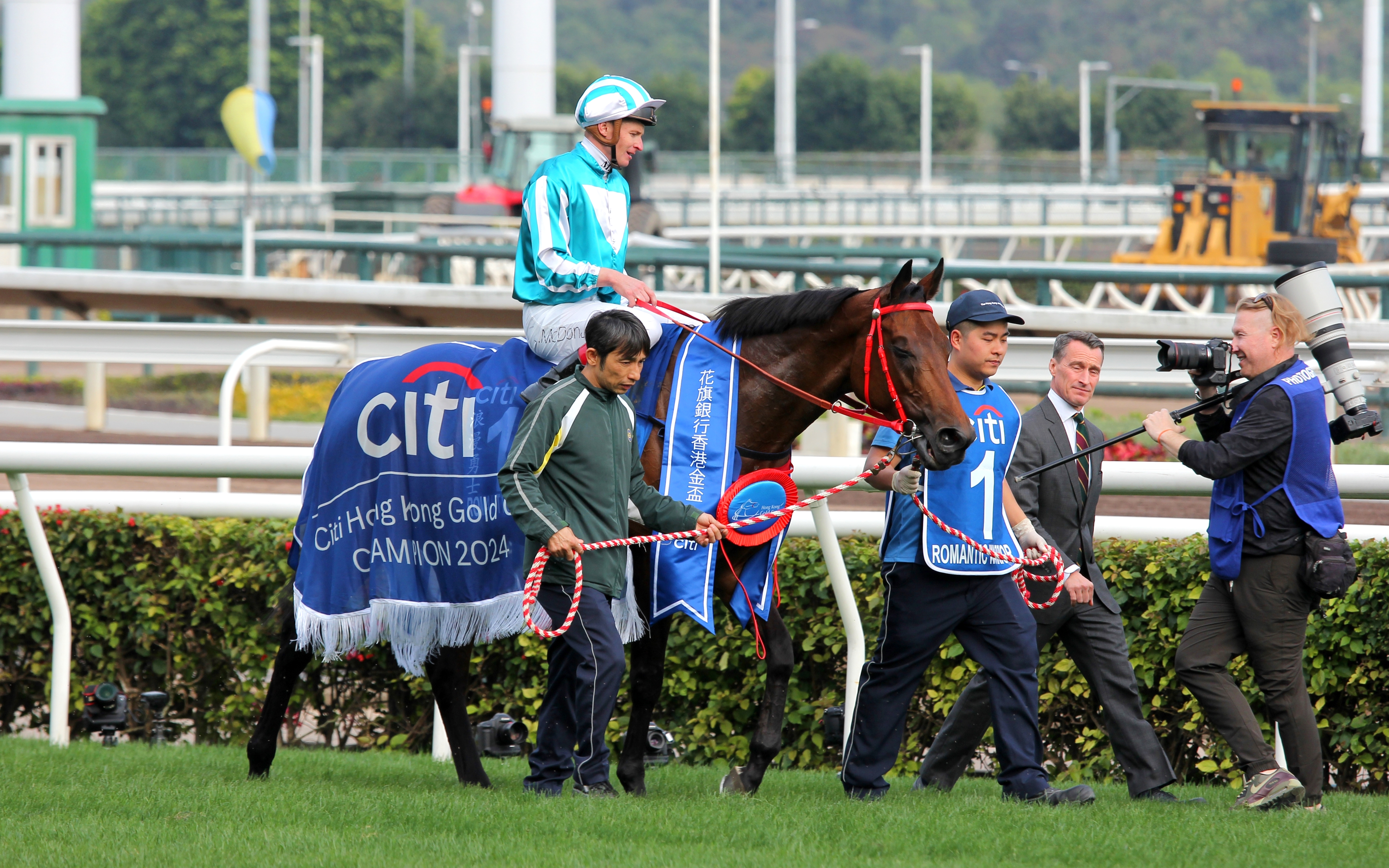
- 2024 Winner Romantic Warrior
- Class: Group 1
- Location: Sha Tin Racecourse; Hong Kong
- Inaugurated: 1979
- Race type: Flat / Thoroughbred
- Sponsor: Citibank
- Website: Citi Hong Kong Gold Cup

Race information
- Distance: 2,000 meters (About 10 furlongs / 1 1/4 miles)
- Surface: Turf
- Track: Right-handed
- Qualification: Three-years-old and up
- Weight: 116 lb (3y); 126 lb (4y+); Allowances; 4 lb for fillies and mares 3 lb for N. Hemisphere 3-y-o
- Purse: HK$12,000,000 (2022)

The Hong Kong Gold Cup is a Group One Hong Kong Thoroughbred horse race held annually since 1979 at Sha Tin Racecourse. It is open to horses three years of age and older. Run on turf, it was initially run over a distance of 1,800 metres, but is now set at 2,000 metres (ten furlongs) and it offers a purse of HK$12,000,000.

The second leg of the Hong Kong Triple Crown, the Group One race comes after the Steward's Cup and is followed by the Hong Kong Champions & Chater Cup. A HK$5,000,000 bonus is paid to the owner of the horse winning all three legs of the Triple Crown Series and a consolation bonus of HK$2,000,000 will be paid to the owner of the horse winning any two legs.

Hong Kong Champion and former Horse of the Year River Verdon won this race three times (1992–1994) and in 1994 became the first horse to ever win the Triple Crown in Hong Kong.

== Recent winners of the Hong Kong Gold Cup ==
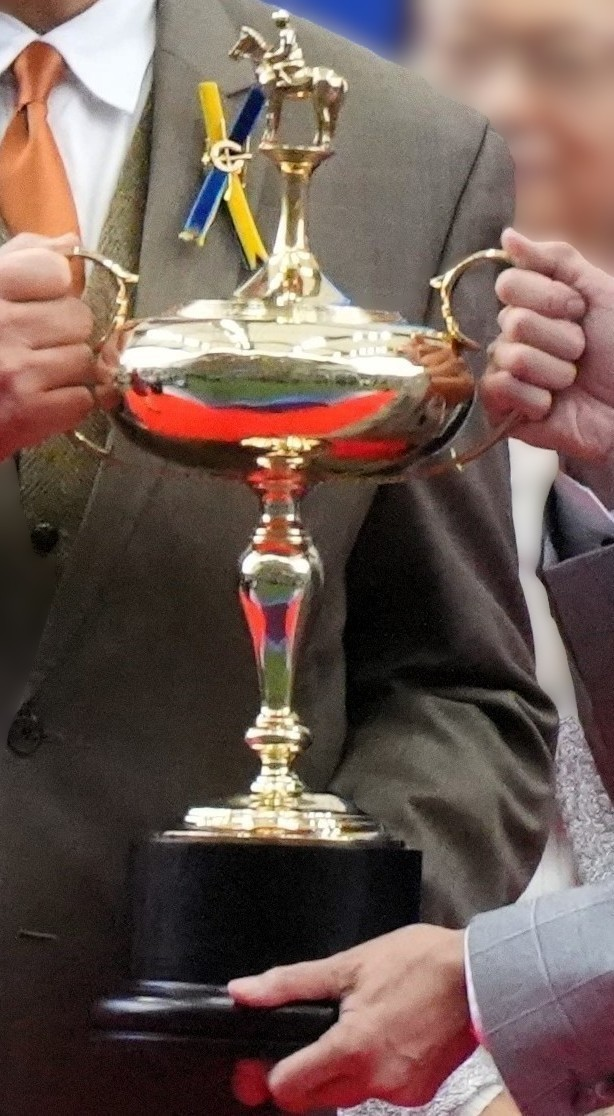
Tropy of the Hong Kong Gold Cup

Year	Winner	Age	Jockey	Trainer	Owner	Time
1993	River Verdon	6	Basil Marcus	David Hill	Oswald Cheung & Ronald Arculli	2:01.60
1994	River Verdon	7	John Marshall	David Hill	Oswald Cheung & Ronald Arculli	2:03.20
1995	Makarpura Star	4	Tony Cruz	John Moore	Frank Wong Wing Pak	2:04.70
1996	Makarpura Star	5	Felix Coetzee	John Moore	Frank Wong Wing Pak	2:03.40
1997	Deauville	5	Eric Saint-Martin	Tony Cruz	Tam Man Wai & Wilson Tam Man Shu	2:03.10
1998	Indigenous	5	Basil Marcus	Ivan Allan	Pang Yuen Hing	2:02.50
1999	Indigenous	6	Douglas Whyte	Ivan Allan	Pang Yuen Hing	2:01.30
2000	Industrialist	4	Alan Munro	Brian Kan Ping-chee	Albert Hu Si Nok & Peter Wong Yau Ming	2:00.20
2001	Idol	4	Michael Kinane	David Oughton	Wong Chi Muk	2:02.10
2002	Industrial Pioneer (Note: The 2002 winner Industrial Pioneer was later exported to Europe and renamed "Sobriety".)	5	Gerald Mosse	Brian Kan Ping-chee	Albert Hu Si Nok, Ngan Keng Hing, Tang Ying Hon & Kenneth Kong	2:02.40
2003	Olympic Express	5	Eric Saint-Martin	Ivan Allan	Larry Yung Chi Kin	2:02.90
2004	Bullish Luck	5	Felix Coetzee	Tony Cruz	Wong Wing Keung	2:02.30
2005	Perfect Partner	5	Christophe Soumillon	Tony Cruz	Gowin Chan/Ringo Ng	2:06.30
2006	Super Kid	6	Shane Dye	John Moore	Wong Yuk Kwan	2:02.80
2007	Vengeance of Rain	6	Anthony Delpech	David Ferraris	Chow Nam & R. G. Chow Hon Man	2:04.40
2008	Viva Pataca	6	Darren Beadman	John Moore	Stanley Ho Hung-Sun	2:03.90
2009	Viva Pataca	7	Darren Beadman	John Moore	Stanley Ho Hung-Sun	2:04.61
2010	Collection	5	Darren Beadman	John Moore	07/08 John Moore Trainer Syndicate	2:01.60
2011	California Memory	5	Matthew Chadwick	Tony Cruz	Liang Yum Shing	2:01.61
2012	Ambitious Dragon	5	Douglas Whyte	Tony Millard	Johnson Lam Pui Hung & Anderson Lam Him Yue	2:02.88
2013	Military Attack	5	Zac Purton	John Moore	Mr & Mrs Steven Lo Kit Sing	2:03.01
2014	Military Attack	6	João Moreira	John Moore	Mr & Mrs Steven Lo Kit Sing	2:01.21
2015	Designs on Rome	5	João Moreira	John Moore	Cheng Keung Fai	2.01.57
2016	Designs on Rome	6	Tommy Berry	John Moore	Cheng Keung Fai	2.01.51
2017	Werther	5	Hugh Bowman	John Moore	Johnson Chen	2.03.78
2018	Time Warp	5	Zac Purton	Tony Cruz	Martin Siu Kim Sun	1:59.97
2019	Exultant	5	Zac Purton	Tony Cruz	Eddie Wong Ming Chak & Wong Leung Sau Hing	2:00.87
2020	Time Warp	7	João Moreira	Tony Cruz	Martin Siu Kim Sun	2:02.00
2021	Golden Sixty	5	Vincent Ho Chak-yiu	Francis Lui Kin-wai	Stanley Chan	2:00.25
2022	Russian Emperor	5	Blake Shinn	Douglas Whyte	Mike Cheung Shun Ching	2:04.11
2023	Golden Sixty	7	Vincent Ho Chak-yiu	Francis Lui Kin-wai	Stanley Chan	1:59.98
2024	Romantic Warrior	6	James McDonald	Danny Shum Chap-shing	Peter Lau Pak Fai	2:00.31
2025	Voyage Bubble	6	James McDonald	Ricky Yiu Poon-fai	Sunshine And Moonlight Syndicate	2:00.59
2026	Romantic Warrior	8	James McDonald	Danny Shum Chap-shing	Peter Lau Pak Fai	1:59.77

== See also ==
- List of Hong Kong horse races
