= Douglas Whyte =

South African jockey and horse trainer

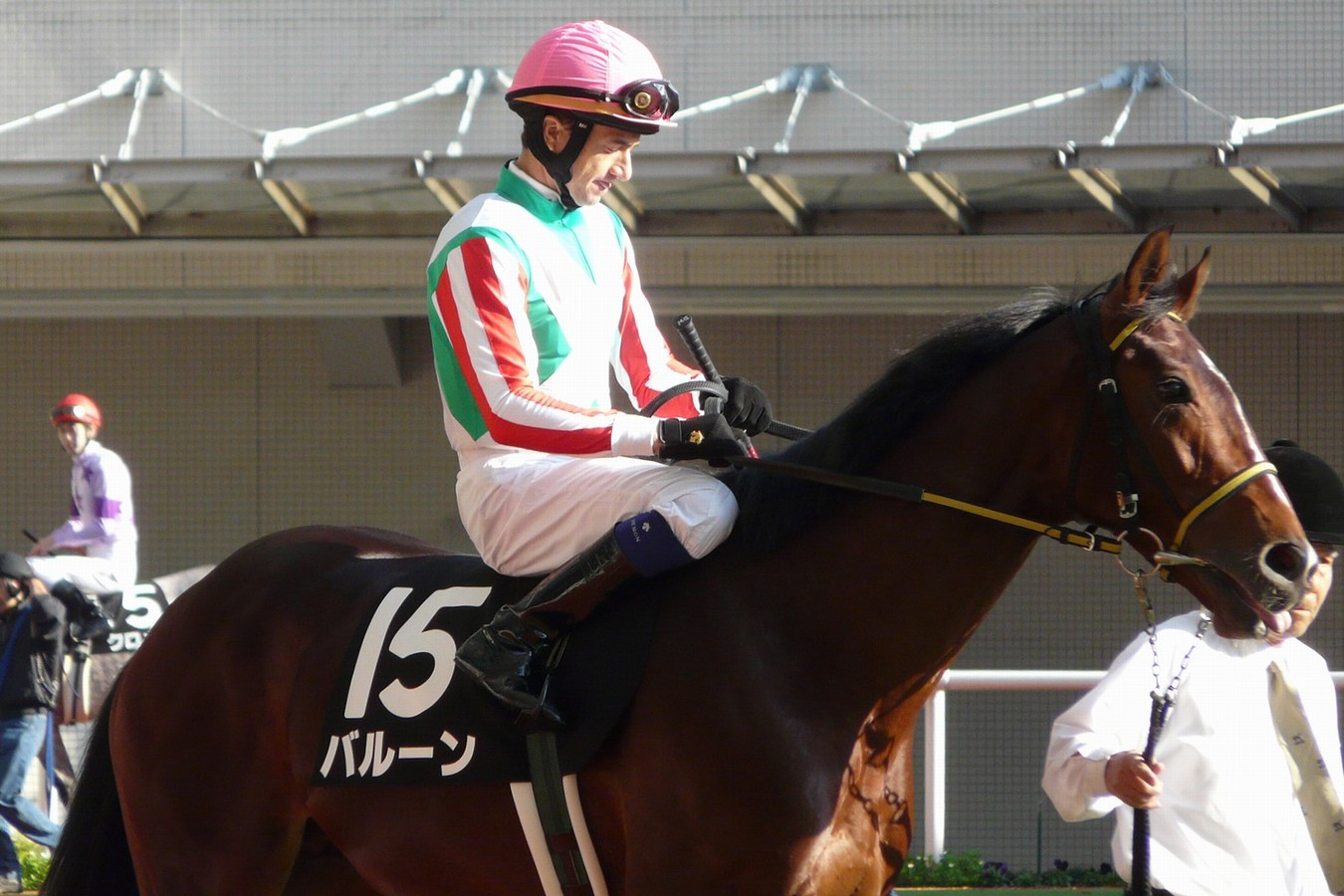
Douglas Whyte

Douglas Whyte (born 15 Nov 1971 in Johannesburg, South Africa) is a former horse racing jockey and is now a horse trainer. He became Hong Kong champion jockey in the 2000-2001 season and won 13 consecutive titles, a record in flat racing. In 2013-14, he relinquished that title to Zac Purton, finishing third with 88 wins to give him an accumulated total of more than 1,600 races in Hong Kong with career stake earnings of more than $HK 1.3 billion.

Douglas Whyte retired as a jockey on 10 February 2019 Shatin meeting. He started as a horse trainer for the 2019/2020 season and finished with 42 Wins.

He has two children Sheikara and Ethan.

== Major wins (As a jockey:) ==
- Queen Elizabeth II Cup - (3) - London News (1997), Oriental Express (1998), Ambitious Dragon (2011)
- Hong Kong Derby - (3) - Super Satin (2010), Fay Fay (2012), Akeed Mofeed (2013)
- Hong Kong Stewards' Cup - (3) - Armada (2007), Ambitious Dragon (2012), Glorious Days (2013)
- Hong Kong Gold Cup - (2) - Indigenous (1999), Ambitious Dragon (2012)
- Champions & Chater Cup - (2) - Cheers Hong Kong (2002), Packing Winner (2008)
- Hong Kong Classic Mile - (2) - Tiber (2004), Gold-Fun (2013)
- Queen's Silver Jubilee Cup - (2) - Billion Win (1998), Gold-Fun (2014)
- Centenary Sprint Cup - (1) - Best Of The Best (2000)
- Chairman's Sprint Prize - (1) - Oriental Express (1998)
- Hong Kong Cup - (1) - Akeed Mofeed (2013)
- Hong Kong Mile - (1) - Glorious Days (2013)
- Hong Kong Vase - (1) - Indigenous (1998)
- Kingston Town Classic - (1) - Moriarty (2014)
- J&B Met - (1) - London News (1997)

== Major wins (As a trainer:) ==
- Centenary Sprint Cup - (1) - Stronger (2022)
- Hong Kong Gold Cup - (1) - Russian Emperor (2022)
- Hong Kong Champions & Chater Cup - (2) - Russian Emperor (2022, 2023)

== Significant horses ==
- Indigenous
- London News
- Oriental Express
- Packing Winner
- Best Of The Best
- Armada
- Super Satin
- Ambitious Dragon
- Glorious Days

== Performance ==
Seasons	Total Rides	No. of Wins	No. of 2nds	No. of 3rds	No. of 4ths	Stakes won
2013/2014	577	88	69	59	62	HK$106,348,525

=== Year-end charts ===
Chart (2014–present)	Peak position
National Earnings List for Jockeys 2014	94
