= Neil Callan =

Irish jockey

Neil Callan (born 1978) is a multiple Group 1-winning Irish jockey who has divided his career between Britain and Hong Kong.

== Racing career ==
Callan, who originates from County Kildare, was an apprentice in the yard of trainer Kevin Prendergast on The Curragh before moving to England in 1998. He established an association with trainers such as Karl Burke, Kevin Ryan and Michael Jarvis, and became champion apprentice with 56 winners in 1999.

He achieved his first Group win in July 2004 on Astrocharm in the Group 3 Lillie Langtry Stakes at Goodwood. In September 2005, Amadeus Wolf, trained by Ryan, provided him with his first Group 1 success when winning the Middle Park Stakes on the Rowley Mile at Newmarket. That season he rode 151 winners and was runner-up in the jockeys' championship. He was again runner-up in 2007, his most successful year with 170 winners.

From 2010, Callan spent several seasons riding in Hong Kong in the European off-season, before making it his base with his family in 2014 and riding as a retained rider to the Hong Kong Jockey Club. A successful decade in Hong Kong included a number of big race victories. Blazing Speed, trained by Tony Cruz, provided him with wins in the 2014 and 2016 Group 1 Champions and Chater Cup, the 2014 Group 2 Jockey Club Cup, and the 2015 Queen Elizabeth II Cup. In April 2021, Callan was banned until the end of the Hong Kong season in July for having been disrespectful to stewards at Happy Valley Racecourse. The suspension was reduced on appeal, allowing him to return to racing at the end of May. It was his last season riding in Hong Kong; he returned to England at the conclusion of the season, citing family reasons. He had won 283 races and over £37 million in prize money in 4,000 rides in Hong Kong.

On 1 October 2022, Callan had his first Group 1 win since returning to England, riding 16-1 chance Fonteyn, trained by Ryan, in the Sun Chariot Stakes. At Royal Ascot in 2023, Callan and Ryan again teamed up to land a Group 1 race with an unfancied runner, when Triple Time won the Queen Anne Stakes. He had a second winner at the meeting with 20-1 chance Burdett Road, trained by Michael Bell, in the Golden Gates Stakes handicap.

In March 2025, Callan received an eight-month suspension for inappropriate use of social media, including posts that were disrespectful to British Horseracing Authority (BHA) officials or prejudicial to British horseracing. The ban was suspended for two years, which meant that he could continue to ride in races. On 12 July 2025, Callan won the Group 1 July Cup on the July Course at Newmarket on 66-1 outsider, No Half Measures, the biggest-priced runner to win the race. It was the first Group 1 success for Richard Hughes as a trainer. After the race Callan said: "Last year was a bit of a struggle and this year's been a bit of a struggle, but you just wait for that one horse".

== Personal life ==
Callan is married to Trish, the granddaughter of Newmarket trainer David Ringer. The couple have four sons. Eldest son Jack started riding as an amateur jockey aged sixteen in 2023 and then, after taking A-levels, became a licensed apprentice with trainer George Boughey. He was crowned British flat racing Champion Apprentice in October 2026.

== Major wins ==
(United Kingdom) Great Britain

- Fillies' Mile - (1) - Hibaayeb (2009)
- July Cup - (1) - No Half Measures (2025)
- Middle Park Stakes - (1) - Amadeus Wolf (2005)
- Nunthorpe Stakes - (1) - Borderlescott (2009)
- Queen Anne Stakes - (1) - Triple Time (2023)
- Racing Post Trophy - (1) - Palace Episode (2005)
- Sun Chariot Stakes - (1) - Fonteyn (2022)

Germany

- Bayerisches Zuchtrennen - (1) - Pressing (2009)

Hong Kong

- Centenary Sprint Cup - (1) - Peniaphobia (2017)
- Hong Kong Champions & Chater Cup - (2) - Blazing Speed (2014,2016)
- Queen Elizabeth II Cup - (1) - Blazing Speed (2015)
- Hong Kong Classic Mile - (1) - Beauty Only (2015)

Italy

- Gran Premio del Jockey Club - (1) - Rainbow Peak (2010)
- Premio Roma - (1) - Pressing (2007)

== Performance at the Hong Kong Jockey Club ==
Seasons	Total Rides	No. of Wins	No. of 2nds	No. of 3rds	No. of 4ths	Stakes won
2010/2011	121	5	10	7	5	HK$6,545,700
2013/2014	412	27	36	43	37	HK$38,526,375
2014/2015	520	47	45	49	44	HK$66,847,491
2015/2016	510	40	40	45	42	HK$57,645,225
2016/2017	541	47	51	48	42	HK$59,383,150
2017/2018	423	25	33	39	34	HK$36,670,300
2018/2019	428	17	39	43	35	HK$31,004,950
2019/2020	481	26	40	40	58	HK$42,185,220
2020/2021	416	28	30	38	32	HK$38,101,250
