= Hong Kong Champions & Chater Cup =

The Standard Chartered Champions & Chater Cup
- Class: Group 1
- Location: Sha Tin Racecourse; Hong Kong
- Inaugurated: 1870
- Race type: Flat / Thoroughbred
- Sponsor: Standard Chartered
- Website: Standard Chartered Champions and Chater Cup

Race information
- Distance: 2,400 meters (About 12 furlongs / 1 1/2 miles)
- Surface: Turf
- Track: Right-handed
- Qualification: Three-years-old and up
- Weight: 119 lb (3y); 126 lb (4y+); Allowances; 4 lb for fillies and mares 4 lb for N. Hemisphere 3-y-o
- Purse: HK$13,000,000 (2024)

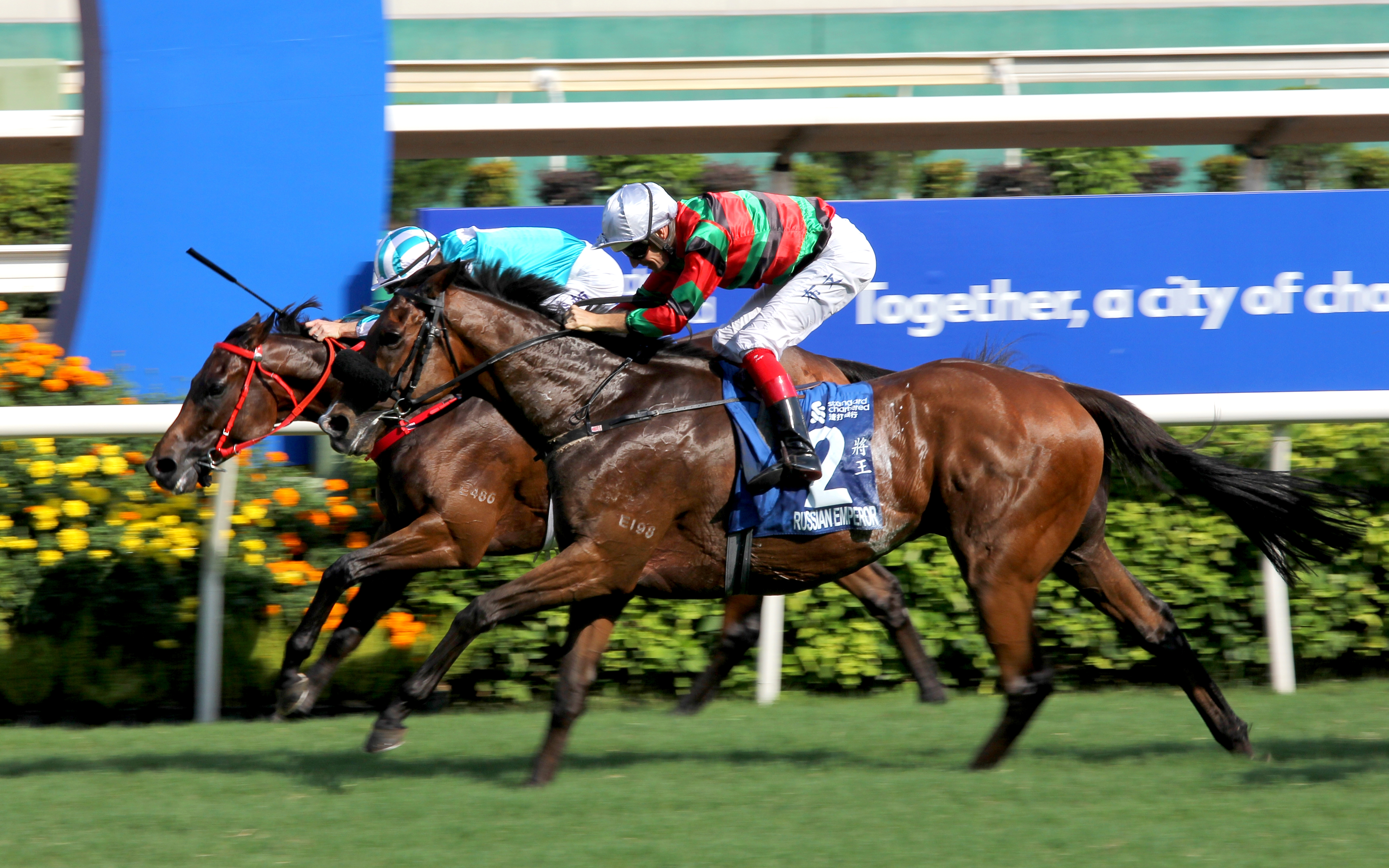

Hong Kong Champions & Chater Cup is a Hong Kong Thoroughbred horse race held annually in late May or early June at Sha Tin Racecourse. A Group One race that offers a purse of HK$12,000,000, it is run on turf over a distance of 2400 meters (prior to 1995 it was disputed over 2200 meters and prior to 1992 over 1800 meters) and is open to horses three years of age and older. The third leg of the Hong Kong Triple Crown, it follows the Steward's Cup in January and the Hong Kong Gold Cup in February. The race has been an International Group 1 race since 2015.

The Hong Kong Champions & Chater Cup was first run in 1870 as "The Champion Stakes". After 1926, this race was renamed as "The Chater Cup" in honor of the renowned Hong Kong businessman and racehorse owner, Sir Paul Chater, who died on 27 May 1926. In 1955, the Hong Kong Jockey Club renamed this race to its current name.

== Winners since 1990 ==
Year	Winner	Age	Jockey	Trainer	Owner	Time
1990	Quicken Away	4	Nigel Tiley	Peter Ng	Lo Sing Pui	1:51.3
1991	River Verdon	4	John Matthias	David Hill	Oswald Cheung & Ronald Arculli	1:48.5
1992	River Verdon	5	Basil Marcus	David Hill	Oswald Cheung & Ronald Arculli	2:16.2 ^{[a]}
1993	River Verdon	6	Basil Marcus	David Hill	Oswald Cheung & Ronald Arculli	2:15.8
1994	River Verdon	7	John Marshall	David Hill	Oswald Cheung & Ronald Arculli	2:16.0
1995	Makarpura Star	4	Tony Cruz	John Moore	Frank Wong Wing Pak	2:30.6
DH	Survey King	5	Greg Childs	John Moore	Mak Kang Hoi	2:30.6 ^{[b]}
1996	Privilege	5	Basil Marcus	Ivan Allan	Peggy Kwoh So Chi	2:26.1
1997	Indigenous	4	Alan Munro	L. S. Li	Pang Yuen Hing	2:28.2
1998	Indigenous	5	Basil Marcus	Ivan Allan	Pang Yuen Hing	2:31.4
1999	Oriental Express	6	Eric Saint-Martin	Ivan Allan	Larry Yung	2:28.3
2000	Housemaster	4	Robbie Fradd	Ivan Allan	Larry Yung	2:27.4
2001	Oriental Express	8	Felix Coetzee	Ivan Allan	Larry Yung	2:28.1
2002	Cheers Hong Kong	5	Douglas Whyte	Ivan Allan	Tuesday Club Syndicate	2:35.0
2003	Precision	5	Brett Prebble	David Oughton	Wu Sai Wing	2:30.4
2004	Super Kid	4	Shane Dye	John Size	Wong Yuk Kwan	2:28.1
2005	Vengeance of Rain	4	Anthony Delpech	David Ferraris	Raymond Gianco Chow Hon Man	2:29.9
2006	Viva Pataca	4	Michael Kinane	John Moore	Stanley Ho	2:29.7
2007	Viva Pataca	5	Michael Kinane	John Moore	Stanley Ho	2:24.6
2008	Packing Winner	5	Douglas Whyte	Peter Ho Leung	Lee Wan Keung	2:27.3
2009	Viva Pataca	7	Weichong Marwing	John Moore	Stanley Ho	2:27.34
2010	Mr Medici	5	Gerald Mosse	Peter Ho Leung	Shi Lap Tak	2:38.49
2011	Mighty High	5	Darren Beadman	John Moore	Albert Hung Chao Hong	2:28.34
2012	Liberator	4	Weichong Marwing	David Ferraris	06/07 David Ferraris Trainer Syndicate	2:30.84
2013	California Memory	7	Matthew Chadwick	Tony Cruz	Howard Liang Yum Shing	2:26.46
2014	Blazing Speed	5	Neil Callan	Tony Cruz	Fentons Racing Syndicate	2:28.11
2015	Helene Super Star	5	Douglas Whyte	Tony Cruz	Wilson Woo, Dawson Woo & Jackson Woo	2:27.52
2016	Blazing Speed	7	Neil Callan	Tony Cruz	Fentons Racing Syndicate	2:26.18
2017	Werther	5	Hugh Bowman	John Moore	Johnson Chen	2:29.26
2018	Pakistan Star	5	Tommy Berry	Tony Cruz	Kerm Din	2.27.42
2019	Exultant	5	Zac Purton	Tony Cruz	Eddie Wong Ming Chak & Wong Leung Sau Hing	2:26.00
2020	Exultant	6	Zac Purton	Tony Cruz	Eddie Wong Ming Chak & Wong Leung Sau Hing	2:26.01
2021	Panfield	4	Karis Teetan	Tony Millard	Yue Yun Hing	2:25.25
2022	Russian Emperor	5	Blake Shinn	Douglas Whyte	Mike Cheung Shun Ching	2:26.67
2023	Russian Emperor	6	Hugh Bowman	Douglas Whyte	Mike Cheung Shun Ching	2:26.87
2024	Rebel's Romance	6	William Buick	Charlie Appleby	Godolphin Racing	2:25.62
2025	Voyage Bubble	6	James McDonald	Ricky Yiu Poon-fai	Sunshine And Moonlight Syndicate	2:26.67
2026	Romantic Warrior	8	James McDonald	Danny Shum Chap-shing	Peter Lau Pak Fai	2:26.67

^{a} Since 1992 the race was disputed over 2200 meters.

^{b} Since 1995 the race is disputed over 2400 meters.

== See also ==
- List of Hong Kong horse races
