= Viva Pataca =

British-bred Thoroughbred racehorse

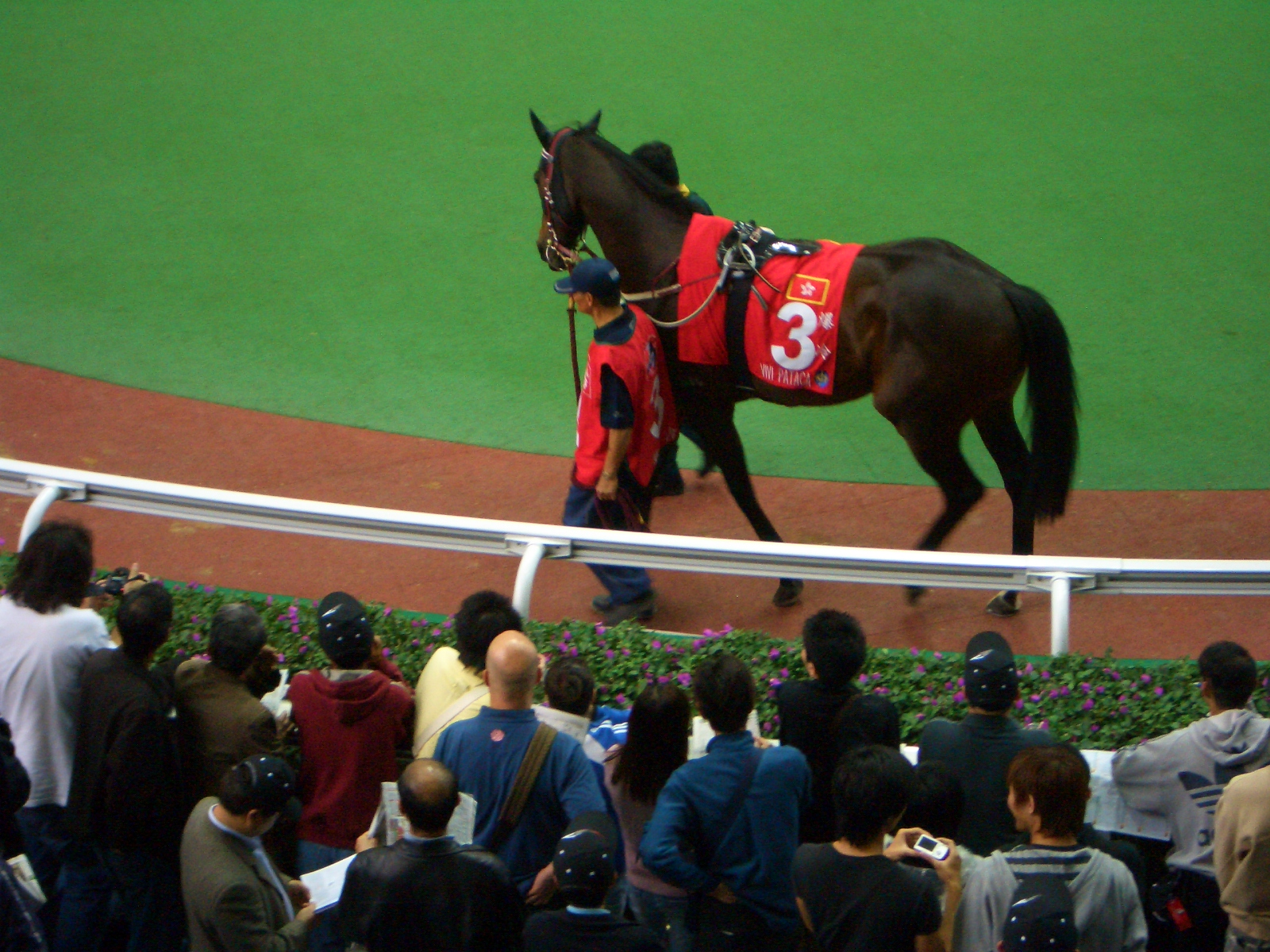
- Viva Pataca at 2007 Hong Kong Cup
- Sire: Marju
- Grandsire: Last Tycoon
- Dam: Comic
- Damsire: Be My Chief
- Sex: Gelding
- Foaled: 2002
- Country: Great Britain
- Colour: Bay/Brown
- Breeder: Dukes of Devonshire & Roxburghe
- Owner: Stanley Ho Hung-Sun
- Trainer: Mark Prescott (UK); John Moore (Hong Kong)
- Record: 60: 17-5-7
- Earnings: HK$83,197,500

Major wins
- Silver Tankard Stakes (2004); Hong Kong Derby (2006); Hong Kong Champions & Chater Cup (2006, 2007, 2009); Queen Elizabeth II Cup (2007, 2010); Hong Kong Gold Cup (2008, 2009)

Awards
- Hong Kong Champion Stayer (2006, 2008, 2009); Hong Kong Champion Middle-distance Horse (2007, 2008, 2009); Hong Kong Horse of the Year(2009)
- Last updated on 19 July 2009

Viva Pataca (Chinese: 爆冷) (foaled 7 May 2002) is a British-bred Thoroughbred racehorse, who achieved his greatest success when trained in Hong Kong.

== Background ==
Bred by the Dukes of Devonshire and Roxburghe, he was out of the mare Comic and sired by English Group One winner, Marju. He was purchased by Neil Greig - Osborne House for 26,000 guineas at the 2003 Tattersalls October Yearling Sale and given the name "Comic Strip."

== Racing career ==
=== 2004–2005: Britain ===
Trained by Sir Mark Prescott at age two, Comic Strip won five of his six starts. After winning his last start in the October 2004 Silver Tankard Stakes, he did not run again until the end of July in 2005 when he finished fourth in a Handicap for three-year-olds at Goodwood Racecourse. Sold to Macau businessman, Stanley Ho, he was renamed Viva Pataca for the Macanese pataca, the currency of Macau.

=== 2006–2011: Hong Kong ===
Viva Pataca made his Asian racing debut at Sha Tin Racecourse in Hong Kong on 1 January 2006, finishing third in the 1400 metre Chang Jiang Handicap. Two weeks later, under new jockey Christophe Soumillon, he won the 1600 metre New Asia Road Handicap then in mid February won the Chukyo Handicap. In late March, Viva Pataca won his first Group One race when he gave trainer John Moore his second win in the Hong Kong Derby. In April, jockey Gerald Mosse rode him to a sixth-place finish behind winner Iridescence in the Queen Elizabeth II Cup. At the end of May he came back with a win under jockey Michael Kinane in the Group One Champions & Chater Cup.

Returning to the track in October for the 2006–2007 campaign, under jockey Eric Saint-Martin, Viva Pataca finished fifth in the Sha Tin Trophy then third in the International Cup Trial. With Christophe Soumillon aboard, he finished fourth to Pride in December's Hong Kong Cup then in late January ran third in the 2007 Stewards' Cup to winner Armada.

With Michael Kinane back in the saddle, in early March 2007 Viva Pataca was second by a nose to Vengeance of Rain in the 2007 Hong Kong Gold Cup. After Vengeance of Rain won the 31 March Dubai Sheema Classic at Nad Al Sheba Racecourse in Dubai. On his return to Hong Kong he was the even-money favorite to win the 29 April running of the Queen Elizabeth II Cup. However, Michael Kinane rode Viva Pataca to a strong win by 1¾ lengths. In the much anticipated 3 June "Rubber match" between the two in the Champions & Chater Cup, Viva Pataca defeated Vengeance of Rain by three lengths while breaking the 2400-metre course record that had stood for thirteen years.

In late August 2007, trainer John Moore had Viva Pataca booked to be flown to Melbourne, Australia to compete in the Cox Plate. However, the trip was canceled after equine influenza was reported in Australia. Moore then considered taking the horse to the United States to compete in the Breeders' Cup Turf at Monmouth Park in New Jersey. Because no Hong Kong horse had ever competed in a Breeders' Cup, it was widely discussed throughout the Asian media. However, owner Stanley Ho eventually decided against it.

Following a layoff of nearly four months, in his return to racing on 21 October 2007, Viva Pataca finished seventh in the 1600 meter Group 3 Sha Tin Trophy Handicap. On 11 November 2007, Viva Pataca won the Hong Kong Cup Trial with ease, successfully outrunning Packing Winner and Art Trader. Then he went straight forward to the Hong Kong Cup, running second behind the winner Ramonti with a short head distance.

Viva Pataca started the 2008 year with the Hong Kong Stewards' Cup, running third. But he won the Hong Kong Gold Cup before he was invited to compete the Dubai Sheema Classic in Nad Al Sheba Racecourse, Dubai, finished in second behind the winner Sun Classique. Viva Pataca then stand to defend the Queen Elizabeth II Cup title but only finished third. Then he also failed to defend the Chater Cup title, which finished in second place.

Viva Pataca started the 2008/09 season with the Sha Tin Trophy, which had a surprising win that beat Good Ba Ba. Then he won the Hong Kong Cup Trial again with went straight forward to the Hong Kong Cup, but only finished fourth.

Viva Pataca started the 2009 year with the Hong Kong Stewards' Cup again, with running third again. But he successfully defend the Hong Kong Gold Cup title. Then he competed for the Chairman's Trophy as a preparation to the Queen Elizabeth II Cup, which he finished in third. In the Queen Elizabeth II Cup, he finished in second behind the winner Presvis. Viva Pataca finished the season with winning his 3rd Chater Cup title in four years.

Viva Pataca become the Horse of the year in 2008/09 1st time in his racing life. Viva Pataca is also the nominees of the Most Popular Horse of the Year 2008/09.
