= Queen Elizabeth II Cup =

Flat horse race in Hong Kong

THE FWD Queen Elizabeth II Cup
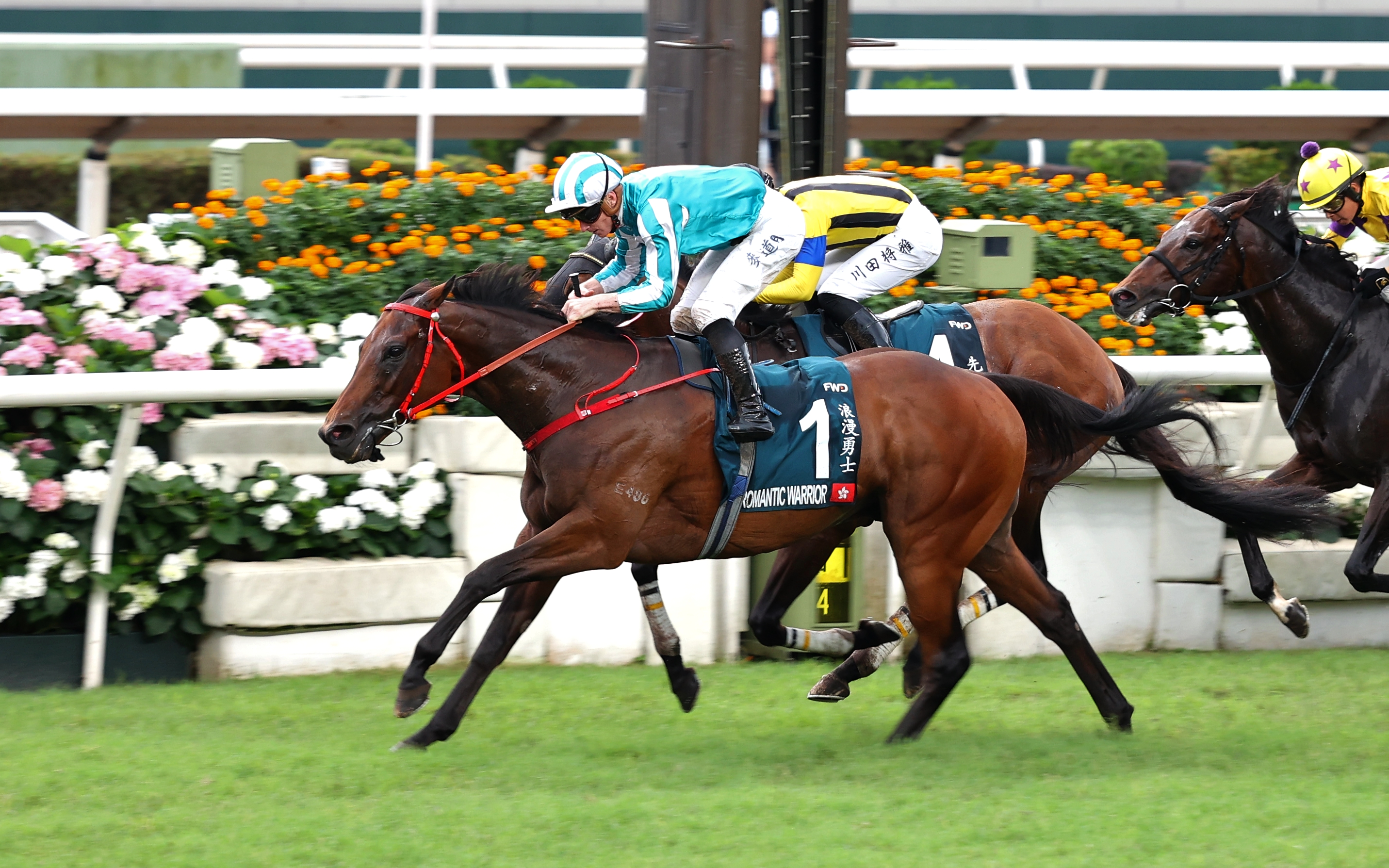
- 2024 winner Romantic Warrior
- Class: Group 1
- Location: Sha Tin Racecourse; Hong Kong
- Inaugurated: 1975
- Race type: Flat / Thoroughbred
- Sponsor: FWD Group
- Website: Queen Elizabeth II Cup

Race information
- Distance: 2,000 meters (About 10 furlongs / 1 1/4 miles)
- Surface: Turf
- Track: Right-handed
- Qualification: Three-years-old and up
- Weight: 119 lb (3y); 126 lb (4y+); Allowances; 4 lb for fillies and mares 6 lb for N. Hemisphere 3-y-o
- Purse: HK$30,000,000 (as of 2026); 1st: HK$16,800,000; 2nd: HK$6,300,000; 3rd: HK$3,450,000

The Queen Elizabeth II Cup is a Group One Thoroughbred horse race at Sha Tin Racecourse in the New Territories, Hong Kong. Established in 1975 by the Royal Hong Kong Jockey Club, it is run annually in April over a distance of 2,000 metres (ten furlongs) on turf. Prior to 1997, the distance of the race was 2,200 metres (eleven furlongs). Sponsored by Swiss watchmaker Audemars Piguet since 1999, it currently offers a purse of HK$20 million (US$2.6 million) since 2014/15.

The Queen Elizabeth II Cup was first run at the Happy Valley Racecourse in Happy Valley, Hong Kong to commemorate a visit to Hong Kong by Queen Elizabeth II and Prince Philip, Duke of Edinburgh. It was a local Class 1 or 2 race over a distance between 1,400 and 1,800 metres until 1995 when it opened to international entries. Since then, Hong Kong horses have been competing against those from the United Arab Emirates, the United Kingdom, France, Japan and Australia.

Since becoming a Group One race in 2001, every winner of the Audemars Piguet Queen Elizabeth II Cup has been a descendant of Northern Dancer. The 2006 race saw Irridescence upset the great filly and European Horse of the Year, Ouija Board.

The Queen Elizabeth II Cup has been sponsored by the Swiss haute horlogerie brand Audemars Piguet for around 17 years now, they continue to make special edition pieces (mostly based on the Royal Oak) to celebrate their sponsorship of the event. They join companies such as Omega SA, Rolex and Longines as one of the official sports event partners that provide both sponsorship and race timers.

Due to the COVID-19 outbreak, no overseas horses entered the race in 2020 and this international Group 1 event became a local race.

== Winners since 1995 ==
Year	Winner	Age	Jockey	Trainer (Trained In)	Owner	Time
1995	Red Bishop	7	Michael Kinane	Hilal Ibrahim (UAE)	Ali Saeed	2:17.20
1996	Overbury	5	Frankie Dettori	Saeed bin Suroor (UAE)	Godolphin	2:14.50
1997	London News	5	Douglas Whyte	Alec Laird (South Africa)	Laurie & Jean Jaffee	2:00.30
1998	Oriental Express	5	Douglas Whyte	Ivan Allan (Hong Kong)	Larry Yung Chi Kin	2:01.00
1999	Jim And Tonic	5	Gerald Mosse	François Doumen (France)	John D. Martin	2:00.10
2000	Industrialist	4	Alan Munro	Brian Kan Ping-chee (Hong Kong)	A. Hu Si Nok & P. Wong Yau Ming	2:02.10
2001	Silvano	5	Andreas Suborics	Andreas Wöhler (Germany)	Stiftung Gestüt Fährhof	2:03.10
2002	Eishin Preston	5	Yuichi Fukunaga	Shuji Kitahashi (Japan)	Toyomitsu Hirai	2:02.50
2003	Eishin Preston	6	Yuichi Fukunaga	Shuji Kitahashi (Japan)	Toyomitsu Hirai	2:03.80
2004	River Dancer	5	Glyn Schofield	John Size (Hong Kong)	Ronald Arculli	2:01.40
2005	Vengeance of Rain	4	Anthony Delpech	David Ferraris (Hong Kong)	Chow Nam & R. G. Chow Hon Man	2:01.80
2006	Irridescence	5	Weichong Marwing	Mike de Kock (South Africa)	Team Valor	2:02.00
2007	Viva Pataca	5	Michael Kinane	John Moore (Hong Kong)	Stanley Ho Hung-Sun	2:01.90
2008	Archipenko	4	Kevin Shea	Mike de Kock (South Africa)	Mohammed bin Khalifa Al Maktoum	2:00.80
2009	Presvis	5	Ryan Moore	Luca Cumani (Great Britain)	Leonidas Marinopoulos	2:02.97
2010	Viva Pataca	8	Weichong Marwing	John Moore (Hong Kong)	Stanley Ho Hung-Sun	2:04.97
2011	Ambitious Dragon	4	Douglas Whyte	Tony Millard (Hong Kong)	Lam Pui Hung	2:02.23
2012	Rulership	5	Umberto Rispoli	Katsuhiko Sumii (Japan)	Sunday Racing Co Ltd	2:02.38
2013	Military Attack	5	Tommy Berry	John Moore (Hong Kong)	Mr & Mrs Steven Lo Kit Sing	2:02.15
2014	Designs on Rome	4	Tommy Berry	John Moore (Hong Kong)	Cheng Keung Fai	2:01.06
2015	Blazing Speed	6	Neil Callan	Tony Cruz (Hong Kong)	Fentons Racing Syndicate	2:02.89
2016	Werther	4	Hugh Bowman	John Moore (Hong Kong)	Johnson Chen	2:01.32
2017	Neorealism	6	João Moreira	Noriyuki Hori (Japan)	U Carrot Farm	2:04.59
2018	Pakistan Star	5	William Buick	Tony Cruz (Hong Kong)	Kerm Din	2.00.21
2019	Win Bright	5	Masami Matsuoka	Yoshihiro Hatakeyama (Japan)	Win Co Ltd	1:58.81
2020	Exultant	6	Zac Purton	Tony Cruz (Hong Kong)	Eddie Wong Ming Chak & Wong Leung Sau Hing	2:00.00
2021	Loves Only You	5	Vincent Ho Chak-yiu	Yoshito Yahagi (Japan)	DMM Dream Club	2:01.22
2022	Romantic Warrior	4	Karis Teetan	Danny Shum Chap-shing (Hong Kong)	Peter Lau Pak Fai	2:00.13
2023	Romantic Warrior	5	James McDonald	Danny Shum Chap-shing (Hong Kong)	Peter Lau Pak Fai	2:01.92
2024	Romantic Warrior	6	James McDonald	Danny Shum Chap-shing (Hong Kong)	Peter Lau Pak Fai	2:01.02
2025	Tastiera	5	Damian Lane	Noriyuki Hori (Japan)	Carrot Farm Co Ltd	2:00.51
2026	Romantic Warrior	8	James McDonald	Danny Shum Chap-shing (Hong Kong)	Peter Lau Pak Fai	2:00.64

== Earlier winners ==
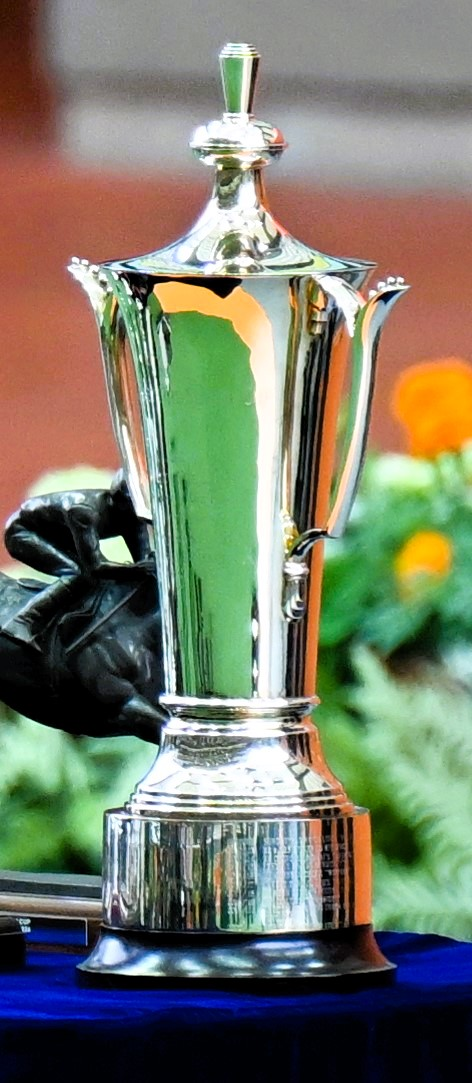
Trophy

- 1975 – Nazakat
- 1976 – Super Win
- 1977 – Wing Take
- 1978 – Nazakat
- 1979 – Go-Getter
- 1980 – Allegro
- 1981 – Classic Boy
- 1982 – Alex Flyer
- 1983 – Fire Ball
- 1984 – Yau Wai
- 1985 – Champion Joker
- 1986 – Powerhouse
- 1987 – Forever Gold
- 1988 – Top Grade
- 1989 – Star Mark
- 1990 – Quicken Away
- 1991 – Galway
- 1992 – River Verdon
- 1993 – Muhim
- 1994 – Deerfield

== See also ==
- List of Hong Kong horse races
