= Hong Kong Cup =

Longines Hong Kong Cup
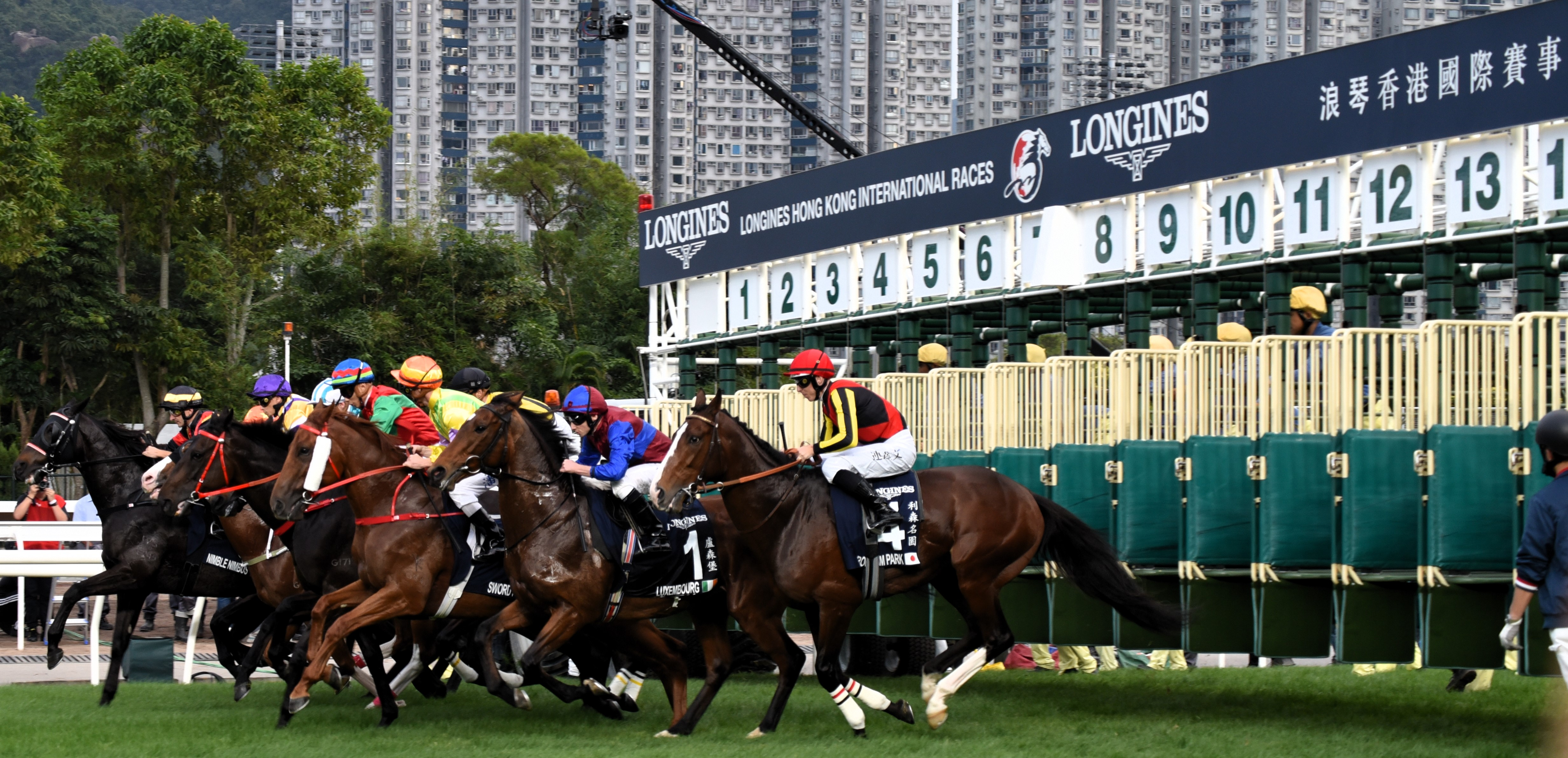
- The Hong Kong Cup race as part of the Hong Kong International Races 2023, held at the Sha Tin Racecourse on 10 December 2023.
- Class: Group 1
- Location: Sha Tin Racecourse; Hong Kong
- Inaugurated: 1988
- Race type: Flat / Thoroughbred
- Sponsor: Longines
- Website: Hong Kong Jockey Club

Race information
- Distance: 2,000 metres (1 1/4 miles or 10 furlongs)
- Surface: Turf
- Track: Right-handed
- Qualification: Three-years-old and up
- Weight: 123 lb (3y); 126 lb (4y+); Allowances; 4 lb for fillies and mares
- Purse: HK$40,000,000 (as of 2025); 1st: HK$22,400,000; 2nd: HK$8,400,000; 3rd: HK$4,600,000

The Hong Kong Cup is a Group 1 flat horse race in Hong Kong which is open to thoroughbreds aged three years or older. It is run over a distance of 2000 metres (about 1 1/4 miles or 10 furlongs) at Sha Tin, each year in mid-December.

The race was first run on 24 January 1988, and its distance was initially set at 1800 metres. The inaugural running was restricted to horses trained in Hong Kong, Malaysia and Singapore. Added to this list for the following season were horses from Australia and New Zealand. The race was switched to December for its third running, therefore taking place twice within 1989. Horses trained in Europe were admitted in 1990, followed by those from the United States in 1991, and Canada and Japan in 1992. The distance was increased to its present length, 2,000 metres, in 1999. Also at this time the race was promoted to Group 1 status.

The Hong Kong Cup is one of the four Hong Kong International Races, and it presently offers a purse of HK$36,000,000 in 2023-24 (approximately US$4.6 million), making it not just the richest race in Hong Kong but also the richest 2000 metre Turf race in the world.

== Records ==
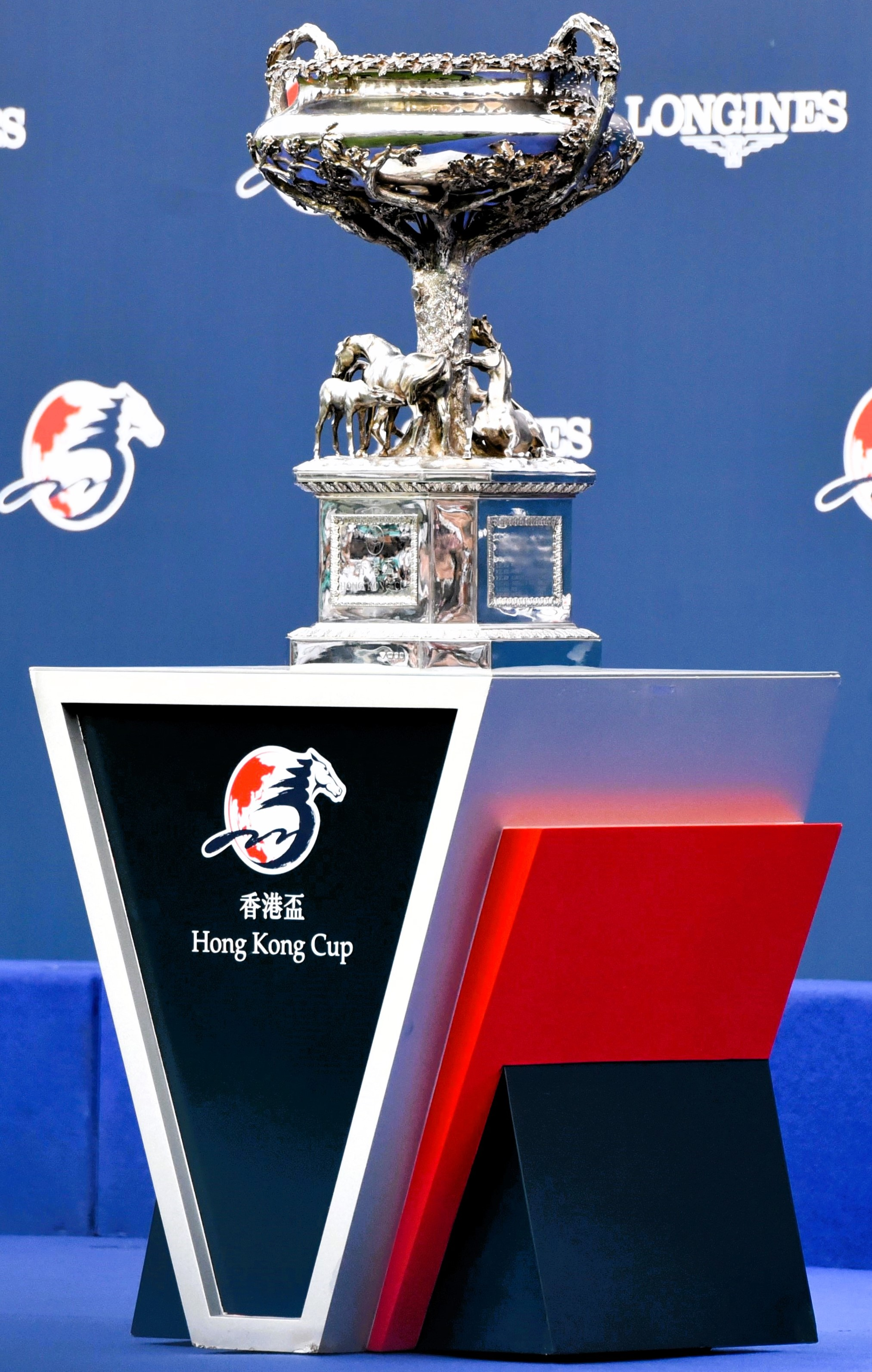
Trophy of the Hong Kong Cup

Speed record: (at present distance of 2,000 metres)

- 1:59.70 – Romantic Warrior (2022)

Most wins:

- 4 – Romantic Warrior (2022, 2023, 2024, 2025)

Most wins by a jockey:

- 4 – James McDonald (2022, 2023, 2024, 2025)

Most wins by a trainer:

- 4 – Danny Shum Chap-shing (2022, 2023, 2024, 2025)

Most wins by an owner:

- 4 – Peter Lau Pak Fai (2022, 2023, 2024, 2025)

== Winners ==
| Year | Winner | Trained | Age | Jockey | Trainer | Owner | Time | 2nd/3rd |
|---|---|---|---|---|---|---|---|---|
| 1988 | Flying Dancer | Hong Kong | 5 | Bartie Leisher | Brian Kan Ping-chee | Lim Por-yen | 1:48.60 | Top Grade / Yuno When |
| 1989 | Colonial Chief | Singapore | 4 | Tony Cruz | Ivan W. Allan | Promise Stable | 1:49.30 | Top Grade / Stingray |
| 1989 | Grey Invader | New Zealand | 4 | Gary Stewart | Alvin Clark | E. J. Johnson et al. | 1:48.00 | Latitude / St James |
| 1990 | Kessem | New Zealand | 5 | Kevin Moses | Brian Smith | B. Duncan et al. | 1:48.40 | Livistona Lane / Colonial Chief |
| 1991 | River Verdon | Hong Kong | 4 | Gérald Mossé | David Hill | Cheung / Arculli | 1:49.80 | Prudent Manner / Majestic Boy |
| 1992 | Romanee Conti ^{[1]} | New Zealand | 4 | Greg Childs | Laurie Laxon | Peter & Philip Vela | 1:48.20 | Fraar / Charmonnier |
| 1993 | Motivation | Hong Kong | 5 | John Marshall | John Moore | Mr & Mrs Hui Sai Fun | 1:49.20 | Verveine / Stark South |
| 1994 | State Taj | Australia | 5 | Damien Oliver | James L. Riley | Neville Begg & Partners | 1:48.40 | River Majesty / Volochine |
| 1995 | Fujiyama Kenzan | Japan | 7 | Masayoshi Ebina | Hideyuki Mori | Tatsuya Fujimoto | 1:47.00 | Ventiquattrofogli / Jade Age |
| 1996 | First Island | UK | 4 | Michael Hills | Geoff Wragg | Mollers Racing | 1:48.20 | Seascay / Kingston Bay |
| 1997 | Val's Prince | USA | 5 | Cash Asmussen | James E. Picou | Martin / Weiner | 1:47.20 | Oriental Express / Wixim |
| 1998 | Midnight Bet | Japan | 4 | Hiroshi Kawachi | Hiroyuki Nagahama | Shadai Racehorse Co. Ltd. | 1:46.90 | Johan Cruyff / Almushtarak |
| 1999 | Jim and Tonic | France | 5 | Gérald Mossé | François Doumen | John D. Martin | 2:01.40 | Running Stag / Lear Spear |
| 2000 | Fantastic Light | UAE | 4 | Frankie Dettori | Saeed bin Suroor | Godolphin | 2:02.20 | Greek Dance / Jim and Tonic |
| 2001 | Agnes Digital | Japan | 4 | Hirofumi Shii | Toshiaki Shirai | Takao Watanabe | 2:02.80 | Tobougg / Terre A Terre |
| 2002 | Precision | Hong Kong | 4 | Michael Kinane | David Oughton | Wu Sai Wing | 2:07.10 | Paolini / Dano-mast |
| 2003 | Falbrav | UK | 5 | Frankie Dettori | Luca Cumani | Sc. Rencati / Yoshida | 2:00.90 | Rakti / Elegant Fashion |
| 2004 | Alexander Goldrun | Ireland | 3 | Kevin Manning | Jim Bolger | Miriam O'Callaghan | 2:03.30 | Bullish Luck / Touch of Land |
| 2005 | Vengeance of Rain | Hong Kong | 4 | Anthony Delpech | David Ferraris | R. G. Chow Hon Man | 2:04.50 | Pride / Maraahel |
| 2006 | Pride | France | 6 | Christophe Lemaire | Alain de Royer-Dupré | NP Bloodstock Ltd | 2:01.60 | Admire Moon / Vengeance of Rain |
| 2007 | Ramonti | UAE | 5 | Frankie Dettori | Saeed bin Suroor | Godolphin | 2:02.80 | Viva Pataca / Musical Way |
| 2008 | Eagle Mountain | South Africa | 4 | Kevin Shea | Mike de Kock | M. bin K. Al Maktoum | 2:00.92 | Balius / Linngari |
| 2009 | Vision d'Etat | France | 4 | Olivier Peslier | Eric Libaud | Detré / Libaud | 2:01.86 | Collection / Presvis |
| 2010 | Snow Fairy | UK | 3 | Ryan Moore | Ed Dunlop | Anamoine Limited | 2:02.94 | Irian / Packing Winner |
| 2011 | California Memory | Hong Kong | 5 | Matthew Chadwick | Tony Cruz | Howard Liang Yum Shing | 2:04.57 | Irian / Zazou |
| 2012 | California Memory | Hong Kong | 6 | Matthew Chadwick | Tony Cruz | Howard Liang Yum Shing | 2:03.09 | Giofra / Alcopop |
| 2013 | Akeed Mofeed | Hong Kong | 4 | Douglas Whyte | Richard Gibson | Pan Sutong | 2:01.96 | Tokei Halo / Cirrus des Aigles |
| 2014 | Designs On Rome | Hong Kong | 5 | João Moreira | John Moore | Cheng Keung Fai | 2:01.96 | Military Attack / Criterion |
| 2015 | A Shin Hikari | Japan | 4 | Yutaka Take | Masanori Sakaguchi | Eishindo Co Ltd | 2:00.60 | Nuovo Record / Blazing Speed |
| 2016 | Maurice | Japan | 5 | Ryan Moore | Noriyuki Hori | Kazumi Yoshida | 2:00.95 | Secret Weapon / Staphanos |
| 2017 | Time Warp | Hong Kong | 4 | Zac Purton | Tony Cruz | Martin Siu Kim Sun | 2:01.63 | Werther / Neorealism |
| 2018 | Glorious Forever | Hong Kong | 4 | Silvestre de Sousa | Frankie Lor Fu-chuen | Michael Kwan Wing Lok | 2:01.71 | Deirdre / Time Warp |
| 2019 | Win Bright | Japan | 5 | Masami Matsuoka | Yoshihiro Hatakeyama | Win Co Ltd | 2:00.52 | Magic Wand / Rise High |
| 2020 | Normcore | Japan | 5 | Zac Purton | Kiyoshi Hagiwara | Seiichi Iketani | 2:00.50 | Win Bright / Magical |
| 2021 | Loves Only You | Japan | 5 | Yuga Kawada | Yoshito Yahagi | DMM Dream Club Co Ltd | 2:00.66 | Hishi Iguazu / Russian Emperor |
| 2022 | Romantic Warrior | Hong Kong | 4 | James McDonald | Danny Shum Chap-shing | Peter Lau Pak Fai | 1:59.70 | Danon The Kid / Money Catcher |
| 2023 | Romantic Warrior | Hong Kong | 5 | James McDonald | Danny Shum Chap-shing | Peter Lau Pak Fai | 2:02.00 | Luxembourg / Hishi Iguazu |
| 2024 | Romantic Warrior | Hong Kong | 6 | James McDonald | Danny Shum Chap-shing | Peter Lau Pak Fai | 2:00.51 | Liberty Island/ Tastiera |
| 2025 | Romantic Warrior | Hong Kong | 6 | James McDonald | Danny Shum Chap-shing | Peter Lau Pak Fai | 2:02.29 | Bellagio Opera / Quisisana |

^{1} The "1992" race actually took place in April 1993 – it had been postponed in December due to an equine virus.

== See also ==
- List of Hong Kong horse races
