= California Memory =

American-bred Thoroughbred racehorse

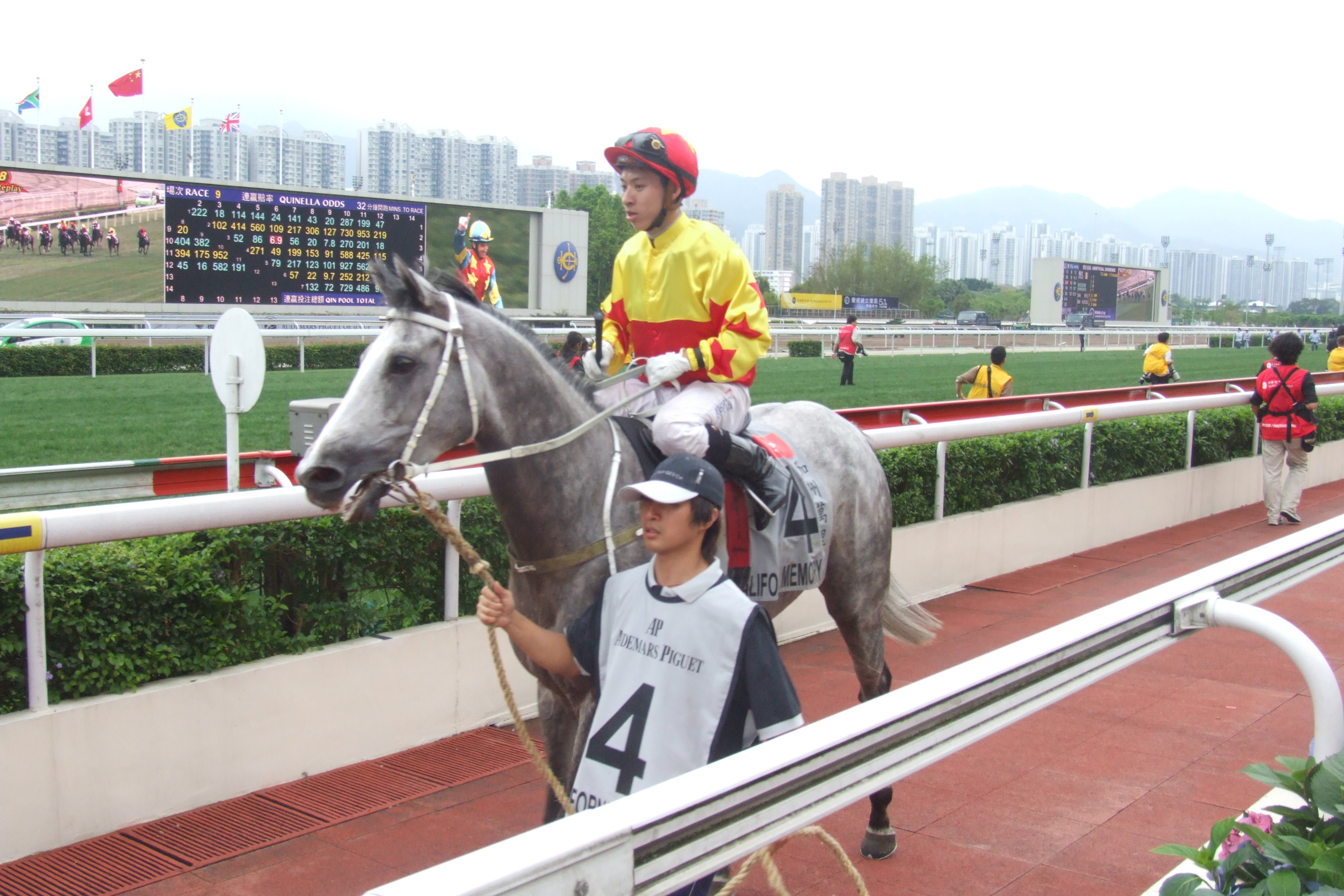
- California Memory
- Sire: Highest Honor
- Grandsire: Kenmare
- Dam: Kalpita
- Damsire: Spinning World
- Sex: Gelding
- Foaled: 2 March 2006
- Country: United States
- Colour: Grey
- Breeder: Fred Seitz
- Owner: Howard Liang Yum Shing
- Trainer: Anthony S. Cruz
- Record: 39:9-2-5
- Earnings: HKD$50,696,050 (£4,238,358)

Major wins
- Hong Kong Gold Cup (2011); Sha Tin Trophy (2011); Hong Kong Cup (2011, 2012); Hong Kong Champions & Chater Cup (2013)

California Memory (Chinese: 加州萬里 ) is an American-bred Hong Kong–based Thoroughbred racehorse. He was one of the nominees of 2010–2011 Hong Kong Horse of the Year.

== Background ==
California Memory is a grey gelding sired by Highest Honor out of the mare Kalpita.

== Racing career ==
Acquired by Spanish buyers, California Memory began his racing career in both Spain and France named Portus Blendium and was trained by a Spanish trainer based in Chantilly, Carlos Laffon-Parias. He won one race from four starts as a three-year-old in 2009.

California Memory was sold and exported to Hong Kong. He finished unplaced on his only start of 2010. In 2011 he became one of Hong Kong's most successful racehorses, winning important races including the Hong Kong Gold Cup, the Sha Tin Trophy and the Hong Kong Cup. In the last named race he defeated an international field which included Cirrus des Aigles and Ambitious Dragon. In 2012, California Memory won the Hong Kong Cup again, becoming the first horse to win that cup twice.
