= Collection (racehorse) =

Irish-bred Thoroughbred racehorse

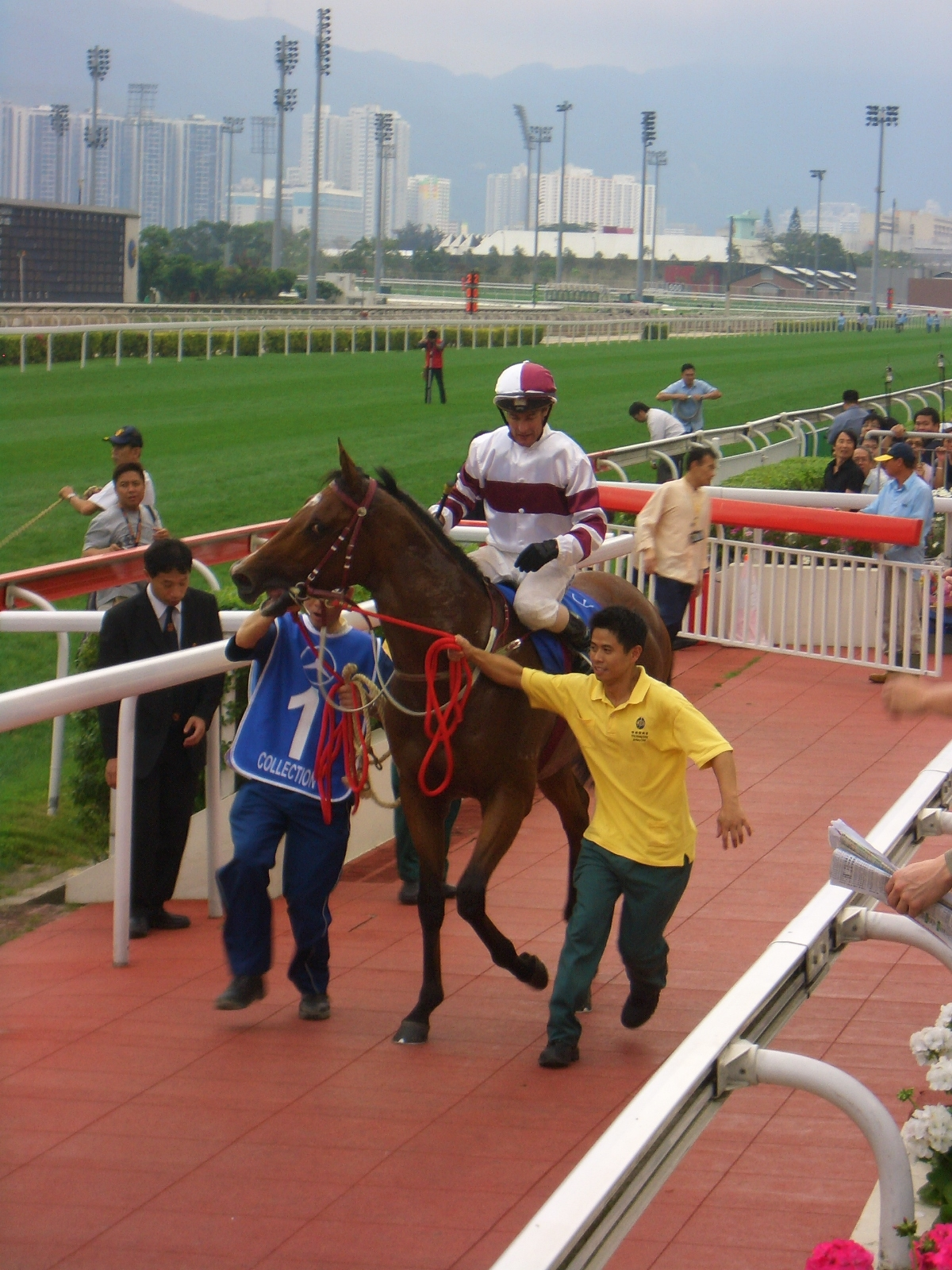
- Collection (horse)
- Sire: Peintre Celebre
- Grandsire: Nureyev
- Dam: Lasting Chance
- Damsire: American Chance
- Sex: Gelding
- Foaled: 13 February 2005
- Country: Ireland
- Colour: Bay
- Breeder: P D Savill
- Owner: 07/08 Derek Cruz Trainer Syndicate
- Trainer: Derek Cruz
- Record: 21:6-2-1
- Earnings: HKD$23,628,500 (As of 27 February 2012)

Major wins
- Hampton Court Stakes (2008); Hong Kong Derby (2009); International Cup Trial (2009); Hong Kong Gold Cup (2010)

Awards
- Hong Kong Champion Middle-distance Horse (2010)

Collection (Chinese: 閒話一句; foaled 13 February 2005) is an Irish-bred, Hong Kong–based Thoroughbred racehorse.

In the season of 2008–09, Collection won the Mercedes-Benz Hong Kong Derby (HK G1-2000m) on 22 March. Collection also was one of the nominees of Hong Kong Horse of the Year in the seasons of 2008–09 and 2009–10.

Collection began his racing career in England where he was trained by William Haggas. Haggas trained Collection to win three of his seven races in 2007 and 2008, including the Listed Hampton Court Stakes at Ascot.

In 2009, Collection was exported to race in Hong Kong and won the Hong Kong Derby on his third appearance for his new trainer John Moore.

In the following season, Collection finished runner up to the French-trained Vision d'Etat in the Hong Kong Cup in December and won the Hong Kong Gold Cup in February 2010.
