= Flying Dancer =

New Zealand-bred Hong Kong racehorse

- Sire: Ballybrit
- Grandsire: Wandering Eyes
- Dam: Pur Sang
- Damsire: In The Purple
- Sex: Gelding
- Foaled: 1982
- Country: New Zealand
- Colour: Bay
- Breeder: Not found
- Owner: Lim Por-yen
- Trainer: Brian Kan Ping-chee
- Record: 26: 5-7-2
- Earnings: HK$2,314,070

Major wins
- Hong Kong Invitation Cup (1988)

Awards
- Hong Kong Horse of the Year (1987)
- Last updated on 2nd March, 2026

Flying Dancer (foaled 1982 in New Zealand) was a Thoroughbred racehorse who competed in Hong Kong. Sired by Ballybrit, a descendant of the British champion Polymelus, he was out of the mare Pur Sang who was from the British Hyperion line.

Owned by Hong Kong businessman Lim Por-yen, Flying Dancer is best known as the winner of the inaugural running of the Hong Kong Invitation Cup in 1988 at Sha Tin Racecourse.

== Pedigree ==
Pedigree of Flying Dancer (NZ), brown gelding, 1982
Sire Ballybrit (NZ) 1973	Wandering Eyes (IRE); 1962	Palestine (GB); 1947	Fair Trial (GB); 1932
Sire Ballybrit (NZ) 1973	Wandering Eyes (IRE); 1962	Palestine (GB); 1947	Una (IRE); 1930
Sire Ballybrit (NZ) 1973	Wandering Eyes (IRE); 1962	Gneevebawn (IRE); 1953	The Phoenix (GB); 1940
Sire Ballybrit (NZ) 1973	Wandering Eyes (IRE); 1962	Gneevebawn (IRE); 1953	Cinnamon (GB); 1934
Sire Ballybrit (NZ) 1973	Banba (NZ); 1965	Resurgent (IRE); 1950	The Phoenix (GB); 1940
Sire Ballybrit (NZ) 1973	Banba (NZ); 1965	Resurgent (IRE); 1950	Gainsborough Lass (GB); 1934
Sire Ballybrit (NZ) 1973	Banba (NZ); 1965	Kay-Ib-Marie (NZ); 1959	Harken (NZ); 1949
Sire Ballybrit (NZ) 1973	Banba (NZ); 1965	Kay-Ib-Marie (NZ); 1959	Royal Vision (NZ); 1951
Dam Pur Sang (NZ) 1975	In the Purple (FR); 1966	Right Royal (FR); 1958	Owen Tudor (GB); 1938
Dam Pur Sang (NZ) 1975	In the Purple (FR); 1966	Right Royal (FR); 1958	Bastia (FR); 1951
Dam Pur Sang (NZ) 1975	In the Purple (FR); 1966	La Mirambule (FR); 1949	Coaraze (FR); 1942
Dam Pur Sang (NZ) 1975	In the Purple (FR); 1966	La Mirambule (FR); 1949	La Futaie (FR); 1937
Dam Pur Sang (NZ) 1975	Rhondalette (NZ); 1969	Oncidium (GB); 1961	Alcide (GB); 1955
Dam Pur Sang (NZ) 1975	Rhondalette (NZ); 1969	Oncidium (GB); 1961	Malcomia (GB); 1952
Dam Pur Sang (NZ) 1975	Rhondalette (NZ); 1969	Miss Rhondda (IRE); 1962	Palestine (GB); 1947
Dam Pur Sang (NZ) 1975	Rhondalette (NZ); 1969	Miss Rhondda (IRE); 1962	Tulira (IRE); 1956

- Flying Dancer is 3x4 inbred to Palestine, meaning that the stallion appears once in the third generation of his pedigree and once in the fourth.
- Flying Dancer is also 4x4 inbred to The Phoenix, meaning that the stallion appears twice in the fourth generation of his pedigree.
