= Jim and Tonic =

French Thoroughbred racehorse

Jim And Tonic
- Sire: Double Bed
- Grandsire: Be My Guest
- Dam: Jimka
- Damsire: Jim French
- Sex: Gelding
- Foaled: 1994
- Country: France
- Colour: Chestnut
- Breeder: S.A.R.L. Nupsala
- Owner: John D. Martin
- Trainer: François Doumen
- Record: 39: 13-13-4
- Earnings: €4,561,647

Major wins
- Prix Perth (1997, 2000); Prix du Chemin de Fer du Nord (1998); Hong Kong Bowl (1998); Hong Kong Cup (1999); Queen Elizabeth II Cup (1999); Dubai Duty Free Stakes (2001); La Coupe de Maisons-Laffitte (2001)

Honours
- French Horse Racing Hall of Fame
- Last updated on February 16, 2007

Jim And Tonic (foaled 1994 in Normandy) is a retired French Thoroughbred racehorse. He raced through age eight at tracks around the world and retired with earnings of €4,561,647, the most ever for any French racehorse.

== Background ==
Jim And Tonic was bred at François and Elizabeth Doumen's Haras d'Ecouves horse breeding farm in Alençon. He was sired by Double Bed out of the mare Jimka. At age two, Jim And Tonic was gelded following an abscess in a hoof that necessitated a lengthy recovery.

Jim And Tonic was trained by François Doumen, renowned trainer of numerous successful flat racing horses as well as steeplechase greats Ucello II, The Fellow, and Ubu III plus two-time World Hurdle champion, Baracouda.

== Racing career ==
Jim And Tonic won a conditions race in France in 1997 then won several more races there the following year. However, his most important win in 1998 came when he was sent overseas to Sha Tin Racecourse where his victory in the Hong Kong Bowl made him the first French horse to win a race in Hong Kong.

In 1999 Jim And Tonic raced in France, the United Kingdom, Canada, the United States, and Hong Kong. He finished second in the Lockinge Stakes at Newbury Racecourse, third in the Atto Mile at Woodbine Racetrack, and under French jockey Gerald Mosse, won both the Hong Kong Cup and the Queen Elizabeth II Cup at Sha Tin Racecourse. Sent to Gulfstream Park in Florida, he finished a disappointing 9th in the Breeders' Cup Mile to the French longshot winner Silic.

Jim And Tonic continued his globetrotting in 2000. In France, he won his second Prix Perth at Hippodrome de Saint-Cloud. He was third in the Hong Kong Cup to winner Fantastic Light and second to Ouzo in the Singapore Airlines International Cup at Kranji Racecourse. In both 2000 and 2001, Jim And Tonic finished second in the Queen Elizabeth II Cup and won the 2001 Dubai Duty Free Stakes at Nad Al Sheba Racecourse.

== Retirement ==
After logging more than a quarter of a million air miles, Jim And Tonic was retired at the end of the 2002 racing season to his birthplace at Haras d'Ecouves in Normandy.
