= Mighty High (horse) =

French-bred Thoroughbred racehorse

- Sire: Peintre Celebre
- Grandsire: Nureyev
- Dam: Bernimixa
- Damsire: Linamix
- Sex: Gelding
- Foaled: 20 February 2006
- Country: France
- Colour: Bay
- Breeder: Aga Khan IV
- Owner: Aga Khan IV; Albert Hung Chao Hong
- Trainer: Alain de Royer-Dupré; John Moore
- Record: 34:5-3-4
- Earnings: HK$10,854,779 (As of 27 February 2012)

Major wins
- Centenary Vase (2011); Hong Kong Champions & Chater Cup (2011)
- Last updated on August 13, 2009

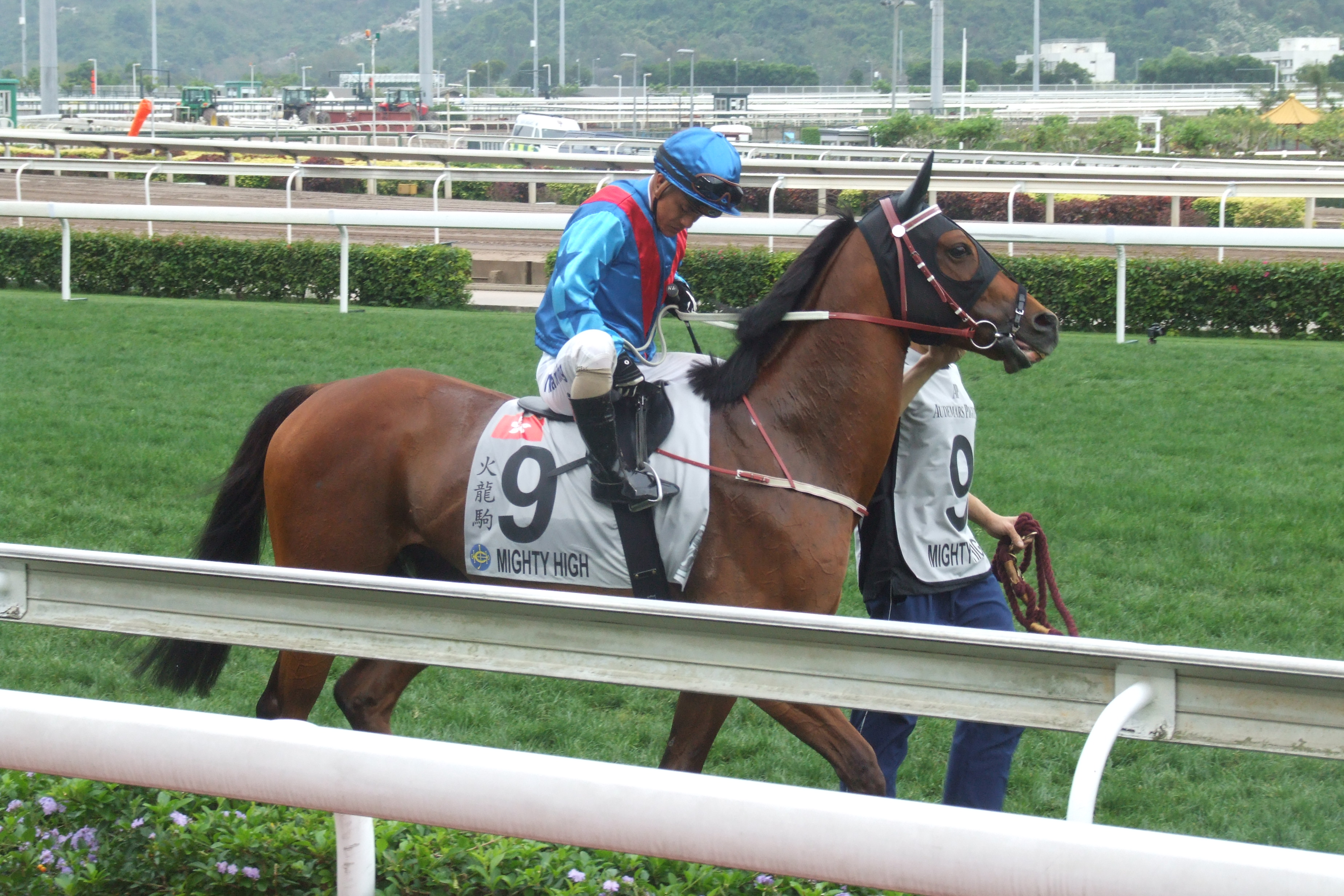
Mighty High

Mighty High (Chinese: 火龍駒 ) is a French-bred, Hong Kong-based retired racehorse. He was one of the nominees for 2010–2011 Hong Kong Horse of the Year.

== Background ==
Mighty High is a bay gelding bred in France by the Aga Khan. He was sired by the Prix de l'Arc de Triomphe winner Peintre Celebre.

== Racing career ==
As a three-year-old, Mighty High was trained in France by Alain de Royer-Dupré and won two of his four races in 2009. He was then sold and exported to race in Hong Kong. Racing at Sha Tin Racecourse he won the Centenary Vase and the Hong Kong Champions & Chater Cup in 2011.
