= Anthony Delpech =

Personal information
- Born: 10 February 1969 (age 57) Seychelles
- Occupation: Jockey

Horse racing career
- Sport: Horse racing
- Career wins: ongoing

Major racing wins
- Durban July Handicap (1998, 2004.2010.2011); J&B Met (1998); Hong Kong Derby (2005); Queen Elizabeth II Cup (2005); Hong Kong Champions & Chater Cup (2005); Hong Kong Cup (2005); Dubai Sheema Classic (2007); Hong Kong Gold Cup (2007)

Racing awards
- South African Champion jockey by wins (1999, 2003)

Significant horses
- Classic Flag, Greys Inn, Vengeance of Rain, Mr Brock, Igugu
- Updated on 29 April 2012

Anthony Delpech (born 10 February 1969 in the Seychelles) is a thoroughbred horse racing jockey who competes internationally.

== Life and career ==
Delpech's family moved to Durban, South Africa when he was thirteen years old. There, he embarked on a career as a jockey. A three-time champion jockey, and the 1998, 2004, 2010 and 2011 winner of South Africa's premier race, the Durban July Handicap, he has ridden at the Champ de Mars Racecourse in Mauritius as well as the Singapore Racecourse in Kranji. In recent years he has met with considerable success at Sha Tin Racecourse in Hong Kong, notably with Vengeance of Rain, on whom he won the 2005 Hong Kong Cup and the 2007 Dubai Sheema Classic at Nad Al Sheba Racecourse. Delpech held the record in South Africa for the most wins by a jockey in a season (334), which he set during the 1998/1999 racing season, until the record was surpassed by Richard Fourie in the 2023/24 season.

After a career-ending injury forced him to retire from the professional jockey ranks, Delpech has worked as a brand ambassador for Hollywoodbets, and racing manager for their Hollywood Syndicate.

== Feature race wins ==
This is a list of Grade 1 wins by Anthony Delpech.

Year	Feature race	Horse	Course	Dist	Country
1998	J&B Met	Imperious Sue	Kenilworth	2000	(South Africa)
1998	Durban July	Classic Flag	Greyville	2200	(South Africa)
2004	Durban July	Greys Inn	Greyville	2200	(South Africa)
2004	Garden Province Stakes	Battle Maiden	Greyville	1600	(South Africa)
2004	Golden Slipper	Princess Sassi	Greyville	1400	(South Africa)
2005	Longines Hong Kong Cup	Vengeance of Rain	Sha Tin	2000	(Hong Kong)
2005	Bochk Jockey Club Cup	Vengeance of Rain	Sha Tin	2000	(Hong Kong)
2005	Premier's Champion Stakes	Talahatchie	Clairwood	1600	(South Africa)
2005	Standard Chartered Champions & Chater Cup	Vengeance of Rain	Sha Tin	2400	(Hong Kong)
2005	Fwd Queen Elizabeth Ii Cup	Vengeance of Rain	Sha Tin	2000	(Hong Kong)
2005	Hong Kong Derby	Vengeance of Rain	Sha Tin	2000	(Hong Kong)
2005	Centenary Vase	Vengeance of Rain	Sha Tin	2000	(Hong Kong)
2007	Dubai Sheema Classic	Vengeance of Rain	Nad Al Sheba	2414	(United Arab Emirates)
2007	Citi Hong Kong Gold Cup	Vengeance of Rain	Sha Tin	2000	(Hong Kong)
2008	Yellowwood Handicap	Prestic	Turffontein	1800	(South Africa)
2008	Starling Stakes	Kiribati	Turffontein	1400	(South Africa)
2008	Graham Beck Stakes	Cerise Cherry	Turffontein	1400	(South Africa)
2008	Golden Horseshoe	Forest Path	Greyville	1400	(South Africa)
2008	Umkhomazi Stakes	Forest Path	Greyville	1400	(South Africa)
2008	Sa Fillies Sprint	Rat Burana	Scottsville	1200	(South Africa)
2008	Drill Hall Stakes	Imbongi	Greyville	1400	(South Africa)
2008	Kzn Guineas	Imbongi	Greyville	1600	(South Africa)
2008	Gauteng Guineas	Imbongi	Turffontein	1600	(South Africa)
2009	Fillies Mile	Sidera	Turffontein	1600	(South Africa)
2009	Dingaans	Curved Ball	Turffontein	1600	(South Africa)
2009	Starling Stakes	Sidera	Turffontein	1400	(South Africa)
2009	Thekwini Stakes	Laverna	Clairwood	1600	(South Africa)
2009	Golden Horseshoe	Musir	Greyville	1400	(South Africa)
2009	Umkhomazi Stakes	Mr Crazy Boy	Scottsville	1200	(South Africa)
2009	Sa Derby	Bouquet-Garni	Turffontein	2450	(South Africa)
2010	Betting World Merchants Stakes	Dance With Al	Kenilworth	1200	(South Africa)
2010	Victory Moon Stakes	Perana	Turffontein	1800	(South Africa)
2010	Gauteng Charity Mile	Alderry	Turffontein	1600	(South Africa)
2010	Gold Vase	Equiparada	Greyville	3000	(South Africa)
2010	Durban July	Bold Silvano	Greyville	2200	(South Africa)
2010	Garden Province Stakes	Here To Win	Greyville	1600	(South Africa)
2010	Astrapak 1900	Bold Silvano	Greyville	1900	(South Africa)
2010	Computaform Sprint	Noble Heir	Turffontein	1000	(South Africa)
2010	Sa Fillies Classic	Here To Win	Turffontein	1800	(South Africa)
2010	Jacaranda Handicap	Queen's Bay	Turffontein	1800	(South Africa)
2010	Hawaii Stakes	Braggadacio	Turffontein	1400	(South Africa)
2010	Majorca Stakes	Gluwein	Kenilworth	1600	(South Africa)
2011	Ipi Tombe Challenge	Igugu	Turffontein	1600	(South Africa)
2011	Racing Association Handicap	Gorongosa	Turffontein	3200	(South Africa)
2011	Durban July	Igugu	Greyville	2200	(South Africa)
2011	Woolavington 2000	Igugu	Greyville	2000	(South Africa)
2011	Golden Horse Sprint	Shea Shea	Scottsville	1200	(South Africa)
2011	Astrapak 1900	Safwan	Greyville	1900	(South Africa)
2011	Umkhomazi Stakes	Silver Age	Scottsville	1200	(South Africa)
2011	The Sa Oaks	Igugu	Turffontein	2450	(South Africa)
2011	Gold Bowl	Herod The Great	Turffontein	3200	(South Africa)
2011	Poinsettia Stakes	Headstrong	Clairwood	1200	(South Africa)
2011	Colorado King Stakes	Captain's Wild	Turffontein	2000	(South Africa)
2011	Man O' War Sprint	Shea Shea	Turffontein	1100	(South Africa)
2011	Sa Fillies Classic	Igugu	Turffontein	1800	(South Africa)
2011	Gauteng Fillies Guineas	Igugu	Turffontein	1600	(South Africa)
2011	Gauteng Guineas	Link Man	Turffontein	1600	(South Africa)
2011	Wolf Power 1600	Call To Combat	Turffontein	1600	(South Africa)
2011	Tony Ruffel Stakes	Link Man	Turffontein	1450	(South Africa)
2012	Cape Fillies Guineas	Rumya	Kenilworth	1600	(South Africa)
2012	Magnolia Handicap	Franny	Turffontein	1160	(South Africa)
2012	Merchants	Jackodore	Turffontein	1160	(South Africa)
2012	Golden Slipper (Saf)	Rumya	Greyville	1400	(South Africa)
2012	Gold Circle Oaks	Tajmeel	Clairwood	2400	(South Africa)
2012	Woolavington 2000	Viva Maria	Greyville	2000	(South Africa)
2012	Camellia Stakes	Welwitschia	Turffontein	1160	(South Africa)
2012	Champions Challenge	Europa Point	Turffontein	2000	(South Africa)
2012	Gold Bowl	Gorongosa	Turffontein	3200	(South Africa)
2012	Caradoc Gold Cup	Atyeb	Turffontein	2850	(South Africa)
2012	Acacia Handicap	Europa Point	Turffontein	1600	(South Africa)
2012	Hawaii Stakes	Kavanagh	Turffontein	1400	(South Africa)
2012	The Met	Igugu	Kenilworth	2000	(South Africa)
2013	Ipi Tombe Challenge	Espumanti	Turffontein	1600	(South Africa)
2013	Graham Beck Stakes	Whistle Stop	Turffontein	1400	(South Africa)
2013	Daily News 2000	Vercingetorix	Greyville	2000	(South Africa)
2013	Kzn Guineas	Vercingetorix	Greyville	1600	(South Africa)
2013	Senor Santa Handicap	Merhee	Turffontein	1160	(South Africa)
2013	J&B Reserve Stayers	Ilsanpietro	Kenilworth	2800	(South Africa)
2013	Flamboyant Stakes	Viva Maria	Clairwood	1600	(South Africa)
2014	Cape Fillies Guineas	Majmu	Kenilworth	1600	(South Africa)
2014	Starling Stakes	Majmu	Turffontein	1400	(South Africa)
2014	Yellowwood Handicap	Pine Princess	Turffontein	1800	(South Africa)
2014	Mercury Sprint	Fly By Night	Clairwood	1200	(South Africa)
2014	Astrapak 1900	Espumanti	Greyville	1900	(South Africa)
2014	Colorado King Stakes	Halve The Deficit	Turffontein	2000	(South Africa)
2014	Riverworld Stud Prix Du Cup	Priceless Jewel	Kenilworth	1400	(South Africa)
2015	Cape Guineas	Noah From Goa	Kenilworth	1600	(South Africa)
2015	Dingaans	Noah From Goa	Turffontein	1600	(South Africa)
2015	Graham Beck Stakes	Muwaary	Turffontein	1400	(South Africa)
2015	Gold Cup	Wild One	Greyville	3200	(South Africa)
2015	Umkhomazi Stakes	King's Knight	Greyville	1200	(South Africa)
2015	The Fillies Nursery	Entisaar	Turffontein	1160	(South Africa)
2015	Computaform Sprint	Alboran Sea	Turffontein	1000	(South Africa)
2015	The Sa Oaks	Pine Princess	Turffontein	2450	(South Africa)
2015	Empress Club Stakes	Majmu	Turffontein	1600	(South Africa)
2015	The Umzimkhulu	One Fine Day	Greyville	1400	(South Africa)
2016	Thekwini Stakes	Querari Falcon	Greyville	1600	(South Africa)
2016	The Gold Bracelet	Flying Ice	Greyville	2000	(South Africa)
2016	Sa Fillies Sprint	Real Princess	Scottsville	1200	(South Africa)
2016	Woolavington 2000	Bela-Bela	Greyville	2000	(South Africa)
2016	Astrapak 1900	Solid Speed	Greyville	1900	(South Africa)
2016	Kzn Guineas	Black Arthur	Greyville	1600	(South Africa)
2016	Kzn Fillies Guineas	Bela-Bela	Greyville	1600	(South Africa)
2016	Poinsettia Stakes	Real Princess	Scottsville	1200	(South Africa)
2016	Tony Ruffel Stakes	Suyoof	Turffontein	1450	(South Africa)
2017	Flamboyant Stakes	Hashtagyolo	Greyville	1600	(South Africa)
2017	Dingaans	Graceandmercy	Turffontein	1600	(South Africa)
2017	Racing Association Handicap	Fortissima	Turffontein	3200	(South Africa)
2017	Garden Province Stakes	Bela-Bela	Greyville	1600	(South Africa)
2017	Kzn Fillies Guineas	Gimme Six	Greyville	1600	(South Africa)
2017	SA Derby	Al Sahem	Turffontein	2450	(South Africa)
2017	The Umzimkhulu	Gimme Six	Greyville	1400	(South Africa)
2017	Sa Fillies Classic	Orchid Island	Turffontein	1800	(South Africa)
2017	Majorca Stakes	Nightingale	Kenilworth	1600	(South Africa)
2018	Gauteng Guineas	Graceandmercy	Turffontein	1600	(South Africa)
2018	Three Troikas Stakes	Fish River	Turffontein	1400	(South Africa)
