= Indigenous (horse) =

Irish-bred Thoroughbred racehorse

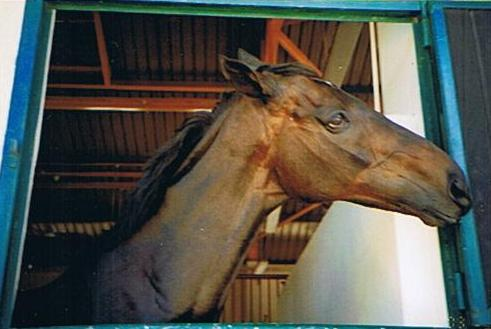
- Indigenous at Tuen Mun.
- Sire: Marju
- Grandsire: Last Tycoon
- Dam: Sea Port
- Damsire: Averof
- Sex: Gelding
- Foaled: 1993
- Country: Ireland
- Colour: Brown
- Breeder: Oldtown Stud
- Owner: 1) Kevin Prendergast; 2) Mr. & Mrs. Pang Yuen Hing
- Trainer: Kevin Prendergast (Ireland); Ivan W. Allan (Hong Kong)
- Record: 64-15-5-8
- Earnings: HK$45,125,289

Major wins
- Hong Kong Champions & Chater Cup (1997, 1998); Hong Kong Vase (1998); Hong Kong Gold Cup (1998, 1999)

Awards
- Hong Kong Horse of the Year (1999)

Honours
- Hong Kong Racing Hall of Fame
- Last updated on 25 October 2007

Indigenous (Chinese: 原居民) (1993–2004) was an Irish thoroughbred racehorse who primarily raced in Hong Kong in the latter half of the 1990s. Born in Ireland, he was brought over to Hong Kong by his news owners, Mr and Mrs Pang Yuen-hing, in either 1996 or 1997. There, he ran a total of 62 times, winning on 12 occasions. This included several major victories, including back-to-back editions of the Hong Kong Champions & Chater Cup and the Hong Kong Gold Cup. Indigenous also finished a strong second in the 1999 Japan Cup to Special Week and third in the 2002 Singapore Airlines International Cup to Grandera. Following his entry in the Japan Cup, he was given an international rating of 119, then then-highest ever mark achieved by a Hong Kong horse. For his efforts, he also received the Hong Kong Horse of the Year award for 1998-1999 from the Hong Kong Jockey Club.

Indigenous retired from racing on 3 June 2003. After this, Indigenous was used at the Tuen Mun Public Riding School in Tuen Mun, New Territories where he died on 8 August 2004, following an illness.

== Career stats ==
- In Hong Kong (inc. representing Hong Kong in foreign races): 62 starts, 12 wins
- In Ireland: 8 starts, 3 wins
