= Lucky Owners =

New Zealand-bred Thoroughbred racehorse

Lucky Owners (幸運馬主) (foaled 27 September 1999) is a New Zealand thoroughbred racehorse who raced in Hong Kong. Sired by Danehill to dam Miss Priority, he won eight races in his career, including the Group One Hong Kong Mile and Hong Kong Derby. He was retired to stud in 2004.

== Trivia ==
- In Lucky Owners' debut race, on 11 January 2003, he was just a 15/1 outsider 30 minutes before the start of the race. Then his odds started to drop dramatically and he became the 7/2 second favourite when the race started. Lucky Owners won this race.
