= Brian Kan =

Hong Kong horse trainer and politician (1937–2022)

Brian Kan Ping-chee
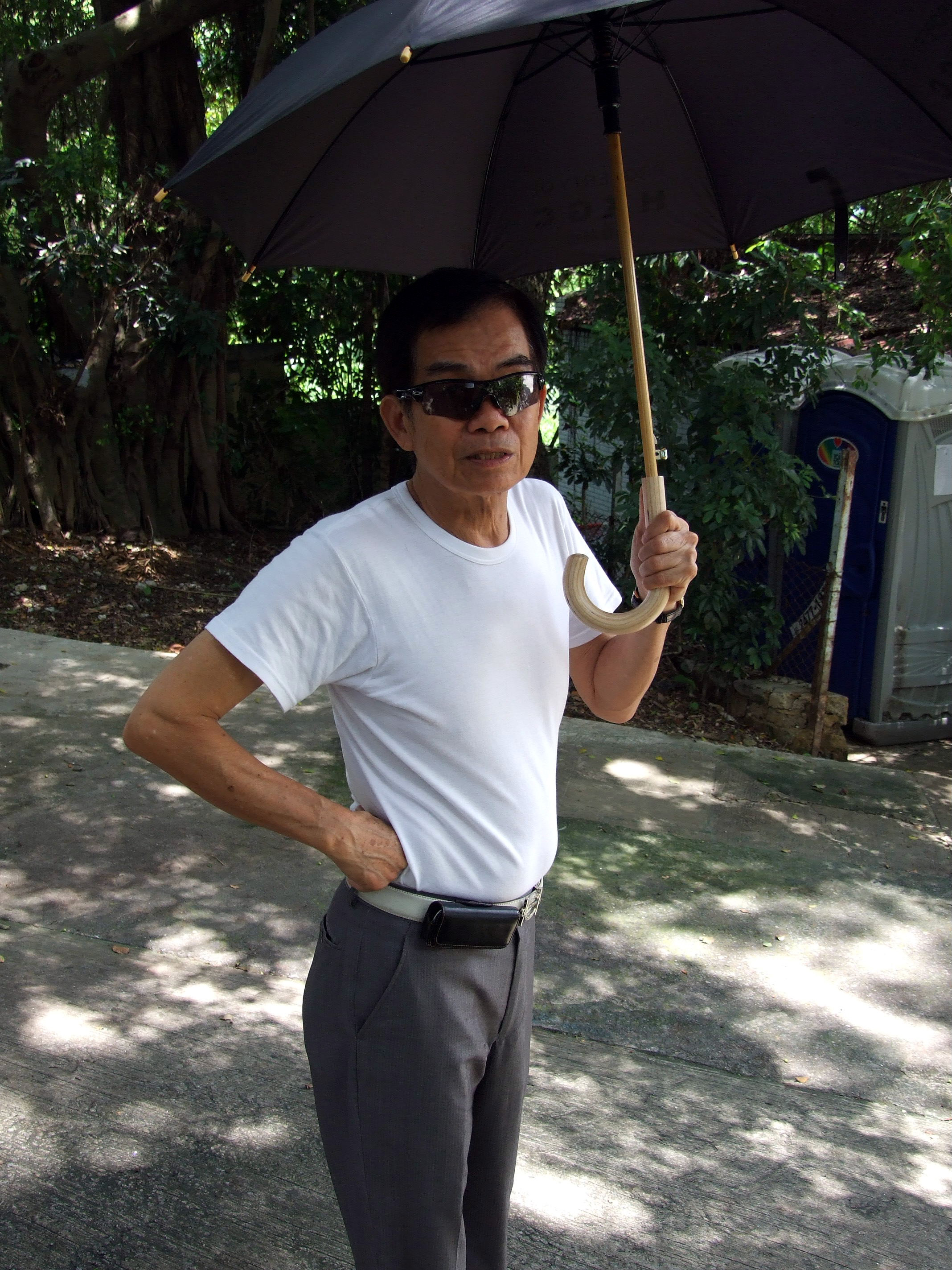
- Kan outside his residence in 2011

Personal information
- Born: 24 November 1937 Sheung Shui, Hong Kong
- Died: 12 February 2022 (aged 84) Sheung Shui, Hong Kong
- Occupation: Horse trainer

Horse racing career
- Sport: Horse racing
- Career wins: 830+

Major racing wins
- Hong Kong Derby (1985, 1986, 1989, 1992, 2001); Hong Kong Cup (1988); Hong Kong Gold Cup (2000, 2002); Queen Elizabeth II Cup (2000); Champions Mile (2001)

Racing awards
- Hong Kong Training Premierships (5)

Significant horses
- Flying Dancer, Industrial Pionner, Industrialist
- Updated on 6 November 2013

Brian Kan Ping-chee (Chinese: 簡炳墀; 24 November 1937 – 12 February 2022) was a five-time champion horse trainer and politician in Hong Kong.

== Horse training career ==
An émigré to the United Kingdom in 1952 who worked in a Chinese restaurant near Epsom Downs Racecourse, Kan found a job as a groom in a horse stable through jockey Teith Tugan and obtained a diploma in horse management. Kan returned to Hong Kong in 1969 and joined the Royal Hong Kong Jockey Club (as it was then known) as an assistant trainer. He was granted a trainer's licence in the 1978–79 season and had since trained a Hong Kong record of over 830 winners and the winners of 100 cup races until his retirement in 2005.

He was five-time champion of 1986–87‚ 1987–88‚ 1988–89‚ 1989–90‚ 2000–01 and his best season was 63 winners in 1989–90. He won the very first Hong Kong Cup in 1987–88 with Flying Dancer. He also trained five Hong Kong Derby winners (most recently Industrial Pioneer in 2001) and the winner of the 2000 Audemars Piguet Queen Elizabeth II Cup‚ Industrialist.

Kan relocated to Macau in 2003-04 season and trained 267 winners until he resigned in 2012.

== Political career ==
Kan was an indigenous inhabitant (Hakka) born in Sheung Shui in northern New Territories. He participated in rural politics and was a member of the Provisional Regional Council from 1997 to 1999, the North District Council from 2000 to 2004, and the Election Committee from 2000 to 2006 as the representative of the Sheung Shui Rural Committee and the Heung Yee Kuk. He ran for the Legislative Council elections in 1995, 1998, and 2000 but was not elected.

== Football management ==
Kan was the president of Double Flower FA from 1986 to 1988. In the autumn of 1987 he was arrested on suspicion of match-fixing after the Hong Kong Football Club filed a complaint with the Independent Commission Against Corruption (ICAC) against his club alleging match-fixing. He was later released without charge.

== Criminal convictions ==
On 28 February 1989, Kan was found guilty of five counts of indecent assault on his Filipino domestic helper and was fined HK$5,000 by the Shatin Magistrates' Court for each count (HK$25,000 in total). The magistrate did not impose a custodial sentence on Kan having regard to his contributions to the community and the impact of the case already on him.

Kan was charged in November 2011 with electoral corruption in the village representative election in 2011. Kan offered HK$130,000 to a village representative, who owned a grocery store, to vote for him as Sheung Shui Rural Committee chairman, which carries ex-officio membership of the Heung Yee Kuk. Although he claimed that he was not aware of the contents in the envelope he left in the grocery store, the judge did not believe his side of the story and found him guilty of the offence. He was sentenced to 3.5 months' imprisonment which was increased to 12 months in October 2013 upon appeal by the prosecution. Kan was ordered to return to prison to serve the additional sentence after completing his original one.

== Death ==
Kan died at his home in Sheung Shui, on 12 February 2022, at the age of 84.

== See also ==
- Terry Kan
