= Dubai Sheema Classic =

- Class: Group 1
- Location: Meydan Racecourse; Dubai
- Inaugurated: 1998
- Race type: Thoroughbred – Flat racing
- Sponsor: Longines
- Website: emiratesracing.com

Race information
- Distance: 2,410 metres (1 1/2 miles) (2,400 metres prior to 2010)
- Surface: Turf
- Track: Left-handed
- Qualification: For Southern Hemisphere 3 year olds and Northern Hemisphere four year olds
- Weight: 3YO 54.5kg, NH & SH 4YO+ 57kg
- Purse: US$6,000,000

The Dubai Sheema Classic is a Group 1 flat horse race in the United Arab Emirates open to thoroughbreds which are four-years-old or above. It is run over a distance of 2,400 metres (approximately 1 1/2 miles; 2410 metres since 2010) on the turf track at Meydan Racecourse, Dubai, and it takes place annually during the Dubai World Cup Night in March.

The race was first run in 1998, and it was initially titled as the Dubai Turf Classic. The present name was introduced two years later. The event attained Group 1 status in 2002. Prior to 2010 it was run at Nad Al Sheba Racecourse.

The Dubai Sheema Classic currently offers a purse of US$6 million making it and the Dubai Turf race two of the most valuable turf races in the world.

== Records ==
Speed record: (at current distance of 2,410 metres and Meydan Racecourse)

- 2:25.65 – Equinox (2023)

Most wins by a jockey:

- 5 – William Buick (2010, 2017, 2018, 2019, 2024)

Most wins by a trainer:

- 3 – John Gosden (2010, 2017, 2021)
- 3 – Charlie Appleby (2018, 2019, 2024)

Most wins by an owner:

- 7 – Godolphin (1998, 2003, 2011, 2017, 2018, 2019, 2024)

== Winners ==
| Year | Winner | Age | Jockey | Trainer | Owner | Time |
|---|---|---|---|---|---|---|
| 1998 | Stowaway (GB) | 4 | Frankie Dettori (ITA) | Saeed bin Suroor (UAE) | Godolphin (UAE) | 2:29.01 |
| 1999 | Fruits of Love (USA) | 4 | Kieren Fallon (IRE) | Mark Johnston (SCO) | Michael Doyle (GB) | 2:28.45 |
| 2000 | Fantastic Light (USA) | 4 | Kieren Fallon (IRE) | Michael Stoute (GB) | Maktoum Al Maktoum (UAE) | 2:27.70 |
| 2001 | Stay Gold (JPN) | 7 | Yutaka Take (JPN) | Yasuo Ikee (JPN) | Shadai Race Horse Co., Ltd. (JPN) | 2:28.23 |
| 2002 | Nayef (USA) | 4 | Richard Hills (GB) | Marcus Tregoning (GB) | Hamdan Al Maktoum (UAE) | 2:29.64 |
| 2003 | Sulamani (IRE) | 4 | Frankie Dettori (ITA) | Saeed bin Suroor (UAE) | Godolphin (UAE) | 2:27.67 |
| 2004 | Polish Summer (GB) | 7 | Gary Stevens (USA) | André Fabre (FR) | Khalid Abdullah (KSA) | 2:31.09 |
| 2005 | Phoenix Reach (IRE) | 5 | Martin Dwyer (GB) | Andrew Balding (GB) | Winterbeck Manor Stud (GB) | 2:30.54 |
| 2006 | Heart's Cry (JPN) | 5 | Christophe Lemaire (FR) | Kojiro Hashiguchi (JPN) | Shadai Race Horse Co., Ltd. (JPN) | 2:31.89 |
| 2007 | Vengeance of Rain (NZ) | 6 | Anthony Delpech (SAF) | David E. Ferraris (SAF) | R. G. Chow Hon Man (HK) | 2:31.03 |
| 2008 | Sun Classique (AUS) | 5 | Kevin Shea (SAF) | Mike de Kock (SAF) | Lionel Cohen (AUS) & W. V. Rippon (SAF) | 2:27.45 |
| 2009 | Eastern Anthem (IRE) | 5 | Ahmed Ajtebi (UAE) | Mubarak bin Shafya (UAE) | Hamdan Al Maktoum (UAE) | 2:31:84 |
| 2010 | Dar Re Mi (GB) | 5 | William Buick (GB) | John Gosden (GB) | Andrew Lloyd Webber (GB) | 2:31:84 |
| 2011 | Rewilding (GB) | 4 | Frankie Dettori (ITA) | Mahmood Al Zarooni (UAE) | Godolphin (UAE) | 2:29.01 |
| 2012 | Cirrus des Aigles (FR) | 6 | Olivier Peslier (FR) | Corine Barande-Barbe (FR) | Jean-Claude-Alain Dupouy (FR) & Xavier Niel (FR) | 2:31.30 |
| 2013 | St Nicholas Abbey (IRE) | 6 | Joseph O'Brien (IRE) | Aidan O'Brien (IRE) | Derrick Smith (GB), Sue Magnier (IRE) & Michael Tabor (GB) | 2:27.70 |
| 2014 | Gentildonna (JPN) | 5 | Ryan Moore (GB) | Sei Ishizaka (JPN) | Sunday Racing (JPN) | 2:27.25 |
| 2015 | Dolniya (FR) | 4 | Christophe Soumillon (BEL) | Alain de Royer-Dupré (FR) | H. H. Aga Khan IV (FR) | 2:28.29 |
| 2016 | Postponed (IRE) | 5 | Andrea Atzeni (ITA) | Roger Varian (GB) | Mohammed Obaid Al Maktoum (UAE) | 2:26.97 |
| 2017 | Jack Hobbs (GB) | 5 | William Buick (GB) | John Gosden (GB) | Godolphin (UAE) | 2:32.39 |
| 2018 | Hawkbill (USA) | 5 | William Buick (GB) | Charlie Appleby (GB) | Godolphin (UAE) | 2:29.45 |
| 2019 | Old Persian (GB) | 4 | William Buick (GB) | Charlie Appleby (GB) | Godolphin (UAE) | 2:27.17 |
| 2020 | Cancelled due to the COVID-19 pandemic. | | | | | |
| 2021 | Mishriff (IRE) | 4 | David Egan (IRE) | John Gosden (GB) | Prince Abdul Rahman al Faisal (KSA) | 2:26.65 |
| 2022 | Shahryar (JPN) | 4 | Cristian Demuro (ITA) | Hideaki Fujiwara (JPN) | Sunday Racing (JPN) | 2:26.88 |
| 2023 | Equinox (JPN) | 4 | Christophe Lemaire (FR) | Tetsuya Kimura (JPN) | Silk Racing (JPN) | 2:25.65 |
| 2024 | Rebel's Romance (IRE) | 6 | William Buick (GB) | Charlie Appleby (GB) | Godolphin (UAE) | 2:26.72 |
| 2025 | Danon Decile (JPN) | 4 | Keita Tosaki (JPN) | Shogo Yasuda (JPN) | Danox Co., Ltd. (JPN) | 2:27.05 |
| 2026 | Calandagan (IRE) | 5 | Mickael Barzalona (FR) | Francis-Henri Graffard (FR) | Aga Khan Studs SCEA (FR) | 2:27.88 |

== See also ==
- List of United Arab Emirates horse races
