= Vengeance of Rain =

New Zealand-bred Thoroughbred racehorse

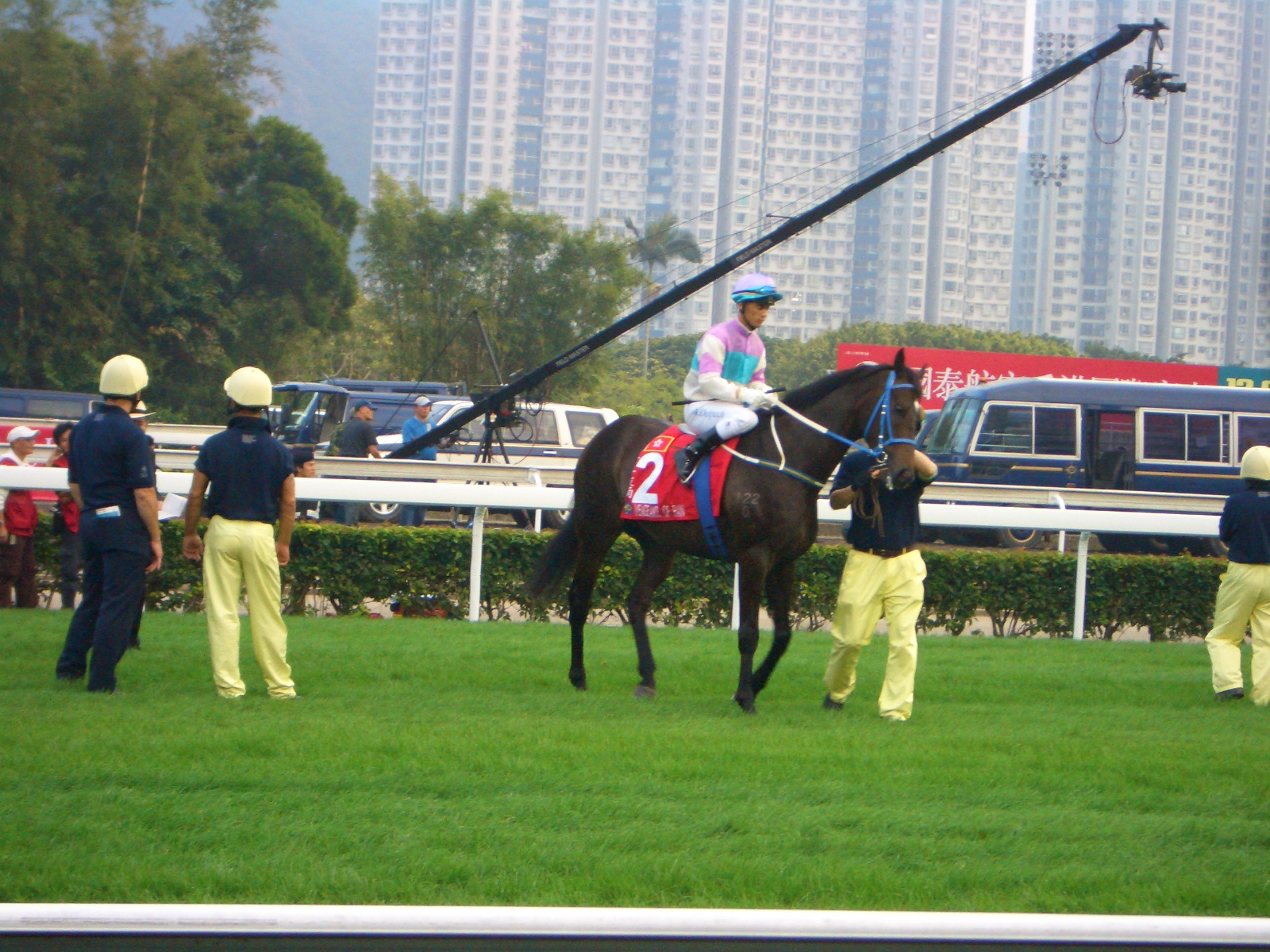
- Vengeance of Rain started at 2007 Hong Kong Cup
- Sire: Zabeel
- Grandsire: Sir Tristram
- Dam: Danelagh
- Damsire: Danehill
- Sex: Gelding
- Foaled: 21 September 2000
- Country: New Zealand
- Colour: Bay
- Breeder: K. Biggs Enterprises Pt. Ltd., Porter St. Investments Pty. Ltd., R. N. Russell, et al
- Owner: Chow Chu May Ping & R. G. Chow Hon Man
- Trainer: David E. Ferraris
- Record: 24: 10-3-4
- Earnings: HKD$75,410,500

Major wins
- Hong Kong Derby (2005); Queen Elizabeth II Cup (2005); Hong Kong Champions & Chater Cup (2005); Hong Kong Cup (2005); Hong Kong Gold Cup (2007); Dubai Sheema Classic (2007)

Awards
- Hong Kong Champion Middle-distance Horse (2005, 2006); Hong Kong Champion Stayer (2005, 2007); Hong Kong Horse of the Year (2007); Hong Kong Most Popular Horse of the Year (2007)
- Last updated on July 6, 2007

Vengeance of Rain (Chinese: 爪皇凌雨) (21 September 2000 – 25 October 2011) was a Thoroughbred racehorse in Hong Kong that won Dubai Sheema Classic (Int'l Group One (G1) over 2,400 metres), the joint richest turf race in the world.

Vengeance of Rain was foaled in New Zealand, trained by David E. Ferraris, ridden mostly by Anthony Delpech and owned by Raymond Gianco Chow Hon Man & Chow Chu May Ping. He was raced in Australia under the name Subscribe before being sold by his owner Lloyd Williams.

Vengeance of Rain's total stakes were over $7.9 million which rated in top 10 of the world. The Hong Kong Jockey Club made a website for Vengeance of Rain on 13 April 2007.

The Hong Kong Jockey Club also published the special edition octopus card for Vengeance of Rain on 30 May 2007. The octopus card is used to celebrate Vengeance of Rain winning the Dubai Sheema Classic on 31 March 2007 and he was crowned the 2006-2007 Hong Kong Horse of the Year on 2 July 2007.

Vengeance of Rain broke the all-time Hong Kong prize money record set by Silent Witness.

Vengeance of Rain died at the Cambridge Stud, where he had been foaled, in October 2011. His death at 11 years old, which is certainly not old for a horse, came as a shock to the owner, who believed: “it might have been a heart attack in his sleep as there was no sign of any distress or injury.”
