= Ambitious Dragon =

New Zealand-bred Thoroughbred racehorse

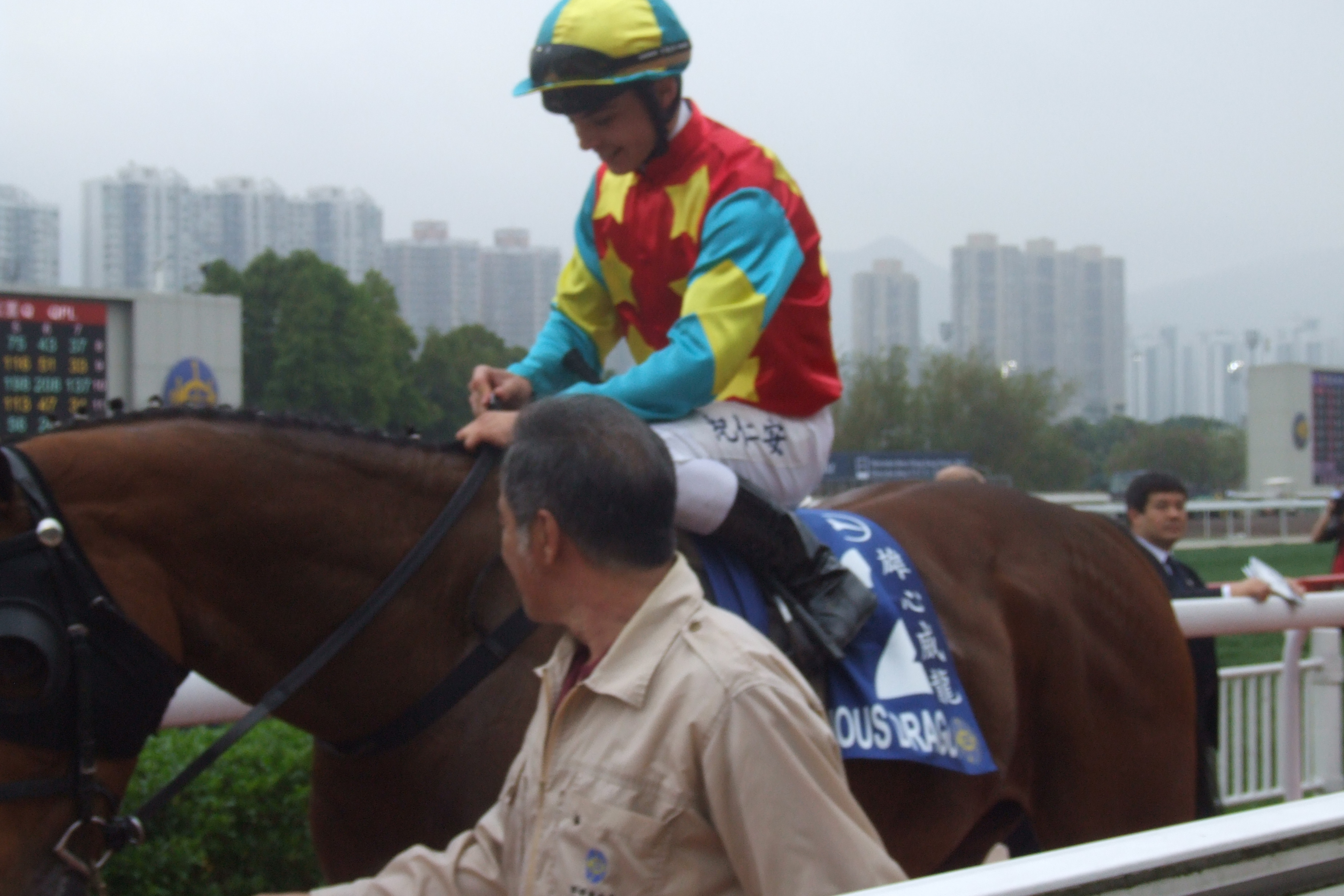
- Sire: Pins
- Grandsire: Snippets
- Dam: Golden Gamble
- Damsire: Oregon
- Sex: Gelding
- Foaled: 3 November 2006
- Country: New Zealand
- Colour: Bay
- Breeder: E. P. Lowry
- Owner: Johnson Lam Pui Hung & Anderson Lam Him Yue
- Trainer: A. T. Millard
- Record: 30:13-5-2
- Earnings: $58,722,850 (18 May 2015)

Major wins
- Hong Kong Classic Cup (2011); Hong Kong Derby (2011); Queen Elizabeth II Cup (2011); National Day Cup (2011); Hong Kong Stewards' Cup (2012); Hong Kong Gold Cup (2012); Hong Kong Mile (2012); Queen's Silver Jubilee Cup (2013)

Awards
- Hong Kong Horse of the Year (2011, 2012); Hong Kong Most Popular Horse of the Year (2011); Hong Kong Champion Miler (2012, 2013); Hong Kong Champion Middle-distance Horse (2011, 2012)

Ambitious Dragon (Chinese: 雄心威龍) is a New Zealand-bred, Hong Kong–based Thoroughbred racehorse. In a racing career which began in 2010 he has won eleven races at Sha Tin Racecourse including the Hong Kong Mile, Hong Kong Classic Cup, Hong Kong Derby, Queen Elizabeth II Cup, Hong Kong Stewards' Cup and the Hong Kong Gold Cup. Ambitious Dragon was voted Hong Kong Horse of the Year for the 2010–2011 and 2011–2012 seasons.
