= David Ferraris =

Hong Kong racehorse trainer

- Born: 18 August 1963 (age 62)
- Occupation: Racehorse trainer

David E. Ferraris (born 18 August 1963, in South Africa) is a Thoroughbred racehorse trainer in Hong Kong.

== Early life and background ==
Born into a racing family, his father, Ormond Ferraris, was a champion trainer in South African racing. He won the South African trainers' title on four occasions, netting 25 Grade 1 victories in well over 1000 wins, with the champions Classic Flag and Celtic Grove his most outstanding performers. Among his notable wins were the 1997 and 1998 Durban July Handicaps, he trained the winners Super Quality and Classic Flag. The Durban July is considered to be South Africa's premier race. Ferraris has won nearly every major race on the South African racing calendar.

== Life ==
In 2003, Ferraris moved to train in Hong Kong where he met with continued success, notably with Vengeance of Rain, winner of several Group 1 races, including the Hong Kong Derby, the Audemars Piguet Queen Elizabeth II Cup, the Hong Kong Cup as well as the 2007 Dubai Sheema Classic at Nad Al Sheba Racecourse in Dubai. Vengeance of Rain retired with total stake earnings in excess of HK$70 million. At the time of his retirement in 2008, Vengeance of Rain was one of the leading stakes-earning racehorses in the world. Other major wins have come with Sweet Orange, winner of the Hong Kong Classic Mile in 2012, and Liberator in the Hong Kong Champions & Chater Cup of the same year. In 2010/11, Ferraris trained 19 winners for an overall total of 251 wins. He sent out 17 winners in 2013/14 for a Hong Kong career total of 300.

In 2015, Ferraris's horse Pikachu won a double in a rare Sha Tin win.

Ferraris would nab another double a year later when his horse Amazing Always won a double at Happy Valley which was the sixth win in ten starts in the Classic Five for Ferraris and Amazing Always In 2017, Ferraris advocated for public notification of throat surgeries for racehorses. Ferraris drew from personal experience as his racehorse Nitro Express, who had throat surgery earlier, won three races after the surgery in 2015.

As of 2018, Ferraris had 397 Hong Kong career wins. Ferraris's most recent horse is BREEDERS' STAR.

== Significant horses ==
- Vengeance Of Rain
- Viva Pataca

== Performance ==
Seasons	Total Runners	No. of Wins	No. of 2nds	No. of 3rds	No. of 4ths	Stakes won
2010/2011	426	19	39	36	38	HK$22,420,100
2017/2018	488	27	40	41		HK$33,464,060
