= Tony Cruz (jockey) =

Hong Kong horse trainer

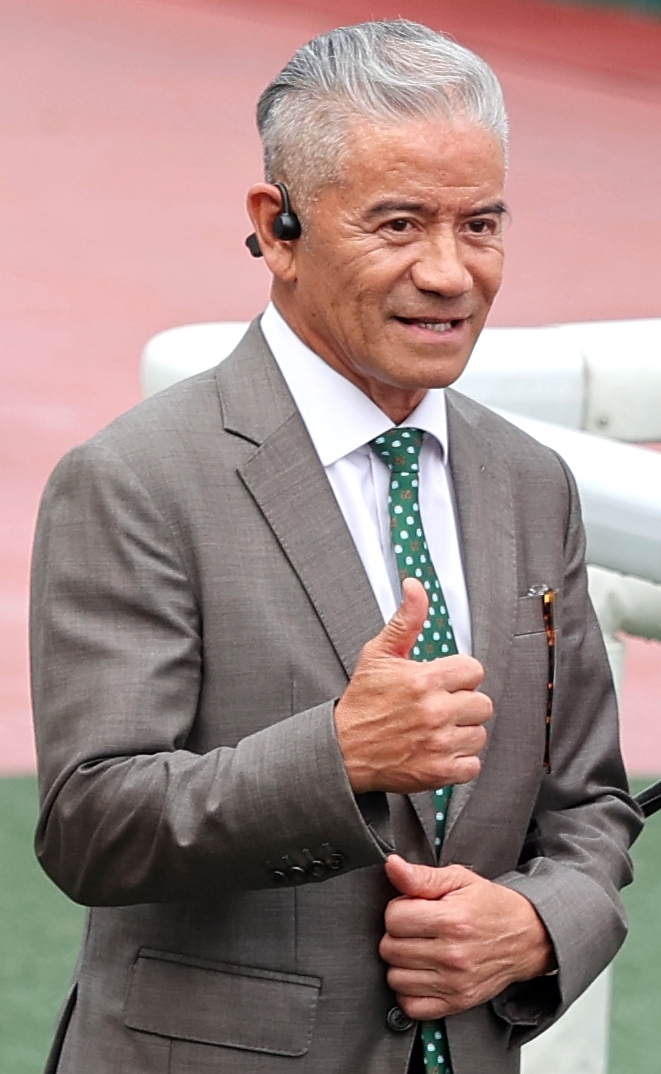
- Cruz at the Sha Tin Racecourse, Hong Kong on 7 April 2024

Personal information
- Born: 24 December 1956 (age 69) Hong Kong
- Occupation: Jockey / Trainer

Horse racing career
- Sport: Horse racing
- Career wins: Not found

Major racing wins
- As a jockey: Hong Kong Champions & Chater Cup (2 times); Hong Kong Derby (1983, 1987, 1988, 1995); Singapore Gold Cup (1984); Champion Stakes (1986, 1987); Coronation Cup (1987); Irish Champion Stakes (1987); Prix Ganay (1987); Prix d'Harcourt (1987); Grand Prix de Chantilly (1988); Grand Prix de Paris (1988); Prix Niel (1988, 1989); Prix Vermeille (1988); Hong Kong Cup (1989); Hong Kong Gold Cup (1995); Prix de Diane (1989); Yorkshire Oaks (1991); Diadem Stakes (1991); Irish St. Leger (1991); Prix Royal-Oak (1991); Prix Eugène Adam (1993) As a trainer: Hong Kong Mile (2003, 2010, 2016, 2022); Hong Kong Sprint (2003, 2004, 2015); Hong Kong Cup (2011, 2012, 2017); Hong Kong Vase (2018); Champions Mile (2005, 2006); Hong Kong Derby (2004, 2008); Hong Kong Classic Mile (2007, 2008, 2010, 2015); Hong Kong Classic Cup (2007, 2022); Stewards' Cup (2005, 2006, 2011, 2014); Hong Kong Gold Cup (2004, 2005, 2011, 2018, 2019, 2020); Hong Kong Champions & Chater Cup (2013, 2014, 2015, 2016, 2018, 2019, 2020); Centenary Sprint Cup (2001, 2004, 2005, 2015, 2017); Chairman's Sprint Prize (2004, 2005); Queen's Silver Jubilee Cup (2009, 2011, 2024); Queen Elizabeth II Cup (2015, 2018, 2020) International training wins: Sprinters Stakes (2005); Yasuda Kinen (2006); Al Quoz Sprint (2024)

Racing awards
- Hong Kong Champion Jockey (1978–1986 & 1994–1995); Hong Kong Champion Trainer (2000, 2005)

Significant horses
- Triptych, Golden Pheasant, Colonial Chief; Co-Tack, Lucky Owners, Russian Pearl; Silent Witness, Bullish Luck, Floral Pegasus, Egyptian Ra, Beauty Flash, California Memory, Blazing Speed, Pakistan Star, Beauty Only, Exultant, California Spangle, Time Warp
- Updated on 6 April 2007

Anthony Stephen da Cruz (Chinese: 告東尼; born 24 December 1956 in Hong Kong) is a prominent horse trainer and former Champion Thoroughbred horse racing jockey.

== Early life ==
Son of Johnny M. da Cruz, himself a well-known jockey, Tony Cruz is of Portuguese descent. He became an apprentice jockey at the age of 14.

== Riding career ==
Referred to as a racing legend by the Hong Kong Jockey Club, Cruz began his professional riding in 1973 and earned his first win on 11 December 1974 at Happy Valley Racecourse. After becoming one of Hong Kong's top jockeys, in the late 1980s he rode in England and France where he enjoyed considerable success, capturing a number of prestigious Group One races.

Cruz has been Hong Kong's champion jockey six times and has won more races there than any other jockey. When he retired from riding he embarked on a career as a trainer that has led to more success.

He won the Hong Kong Derby four times aboard Co-Tack (1983), Tea For Two II (1987), Clear City (1988), Makarpura Star (1995). He has also ridden to victory in the Hong Kong Champions & Chater Cup on two occasions. Overall, he won 946 wins in Hong Kong as a jockey.

== Training career ==
Cruz became a trainer in 1996–97 season. He has since won the trainer championship twice in 1999-2000 and 2004–05.

In 2010/11 in which he won 72 races, including two HKG1s and the G1 CXHK Mile with Beauty Flash, for a career total of 801.

== Performance ==
| Seasons | Total Runners | No. of Wins | No. of 2nds | No. of 3rds | No. of 4ths | Stakes won |
|---|---|---|---|---|---|---|
| 2010/2011 | 630 | 72 | 53 | 57 | 52 | HK$79,735,725 |

== Notable horses ==
Notably he trained two-time Hong Kong Horse of the Year Silent Witness (2004, 2005) and his third straight Hong Kong Horse of the Year, 2006 winner, Bullish Luck.

As a trainer he won Hong Kong Derby in 2004 with Lucky Owners, and in 2008 with Helene Mascot.
