= Ivan Allan =

British racehorse trainer and businessman (1941–2009)

- Born: 16 January 1941; Penang, Malaysia
- Died: 4 November 2009 (aged 68); Singapore
- Occupations: Race horse trainer, businessman

Ivan Allan (16 January 1941 – 4 November 2009) was a champion racehorse trainer and businessman.

On 24 May 1983, Allan was shot by gunmen outside his house and was rushed to Toa Payoh Hospital. Three bullets were removed while one remained in his chest.

Allan became the subject of controversy after being romantically involved for over ten years with actress Glory Annen Clibbery. After a domestic violence incident in July 2000 Clibbery ended the relationship. Allan hired an attorney when Clibbery refused to vacate the Piccadilly home they had both lived in for over a decade.

Allan died at age 68 in Singapore.
