= Kebble =

Kebble is a surname. Notable people with the surname include:

- Brett Kebble (1964–2005), South African businessman
- Guy Kebble (born 1966), South African rugby union player
- Oli Kebble (born 1992), Scottish rugby union player
- Roger Kebble (1939–2015), South African mining magnate
