= Lenin (horse) =

South African-bred Thoroughbred racehorse

- Sire: Sunstone
- Grandsire: Sunstar
- Dam: Drohsky
- Damsire: Polyphontes
- Sex: Stallion
- Foaled: 1937
- Country: South Africa
- Colour: Bay
- Breeder: Birch Brothers, Vogel Vlei Stud
- Owner: M Lipschitz
- Trainer: WW Pickering, JA Pickering, W Murphy
- Record: 44: 18-6-4
- Earnings: R32 422

Major wins
- South African Nursery Plate (1939); Gosforth Park Juvenile Plate (1940); African Breeders Stakes (1940); Champion Stakes (1940); Natal Guineas (1940); Benoni Guineas (1940); South African Derby (1940); Johannesburg Summer Handicap (1940); Johannesburg Merchants (1942)

Awards
- South African Champion Two-Year Old (1939/40); South African Champion Three-Year Old (1940/41)

Lenin (foaled 1937) was a South African bred Thoroughbred racehorse who was a Champion at two and three years of age in South Africa. He was purchased for 650 guineas by Maurice Lipschitz at the 1939 Rand Yearling Sales in Johannesburg. He raced from 1939 to 1943 in South Africa and won 18 of his 44 starts and R32 422, an earnings record at the time. Among his wins were The South African Derby, Johannesburg Summer Handicap, Champion Stakes, Benoni Guineas and Natal Guineas. He won from 1000m to 3200m. He is regarded as the best racehorse to have run in South Africa in the first half of the 20th century.

== Background ==
South African horse racing at that time was dominated by handicaps and there were very few equal weight races outside of age group (two and three year old) races. As a result Lenin carried 133lbs or more in 33 of his 44 starts. Had he raced in the modern era with its many weight-for-age races it is almost certain he would have won many more races. Edmund Nelson wrote in 1966 in the South African Racehorse magazine that "the allocation of the big money should be on merit, not the whim of the handicapper. Our big handicaps are too rich in value, and they encourage false values in assessing the official statistics". Writing in 1982 renowned racecourse commentator Ernie Duffield wrote "The present record stake-earner Politician, would never have won the number of races he did win if he had raced in the old days, because we did not have the number of weight-for-age races and he would have been penalised correctly for every one of his wins".

Lenin was foaled at the famous Vogel Vlei Stud owned by the Birch Brothers. His birth "encapsulated the Birch philosophy of never mollycoddling horses. Lenin was actually born out in the veld during a snowstorm.” “Nobody could get to him for a whole week, but Drohsky suckled him and kept him alive all that time". "Lenin’s mother was an imported English mare called Drohsky, who is still revered among the Birches and ascribed “foundation mare” status. Drohsky’s family threw dozens of great racehorses, with her grand-daughter Maritime producing no less than two July winners, Sea Cottage and Naval Escort, and a July second, Top Gallant."

Lenin “remained the greatest hero of the (South African) turf for some 25 years until two great horses, Colorado King and Sea Cottage, began vying for the title" Lenin was retired to Lion Hill Stud in 1943 by his owner Maurice Lipschitz. Two of his daughters produced two decent stakes performers in Cuff Link (Johannesburg Summer Handicap, Gold Cup twice) and Casbah (Johannesburg Spring Handicap, Johannesburg Summer Handicap)

== Race record ==
At 2	6 starts 4 wins 1 third R5 016	1939/40
4th	South African Produce Stakes (1000m Gosforth Park) beaten 4 lengths	12/02/39
Won	South African Nursery Plate (1000m Turffontein) by 2.50 lengths	12/23/39
3rd	Doornfontein Juvenile Handicap (1200m Turffontein) beaten 1 length	03/23/40
Won	B Division Handicap (1400m Gosforth Park) by 2 lengths	04/13/40
Won	Gosforth Park Juvenile Plate (1400m Gosforth Park) by 4 lengths	05/15/40
Won	African Breeders’ Plate (1400m Greyville) by 4 lengths carrying 140lbs in a new race record	07/10/40
At 3	8 starts 5 wins 1 second R13 820	1940/41
Won	Champion Stakes (1800m Greyville) by 4 lengths	08/03/40
Won	Natal Guineas (1600m Greyville) by 5 lengths	10/05/40
Won	Benoni Guineas (1600m Gosforth Park) by 10 lengths	11/02/40
Won	Johannesburg Summer Handicap (2000m Turffontein) beaten 0.50 lengths but won on disqualification of the winner	12/21/40
Won	South African Derby (2400m Turffontein) by 6 lengths	12/26/40
2nd	Johannesburg Winter Handicap (1600m Turffontein) beaten a head carrying 138lbs	05/31/41
5th	Durban July Handicap (2000m Greyville) carrying 134 lbs, 6 lbs more than any other horse and 32lbs more than the winner	07/05/41
Unpl	Clairwood Winter Handicap (1600m Clairwood)	07/19/41
At 4	14 starts 4 wins 3 seconds 2 thirds R7 698	1941/42
2nd	Champion Stakes (1800m Greyville) beaten 1 length	08/02/41
Won	Johannesburg Spring Handicap (1600m Turffontein) by 2.5 lengths	10/04/41
Unpl	Johannesburg Summer Handicap (2000m Turffontein) carried 138lbs	12/20/41
Won	Charles Marx Memorial Plate (1800m Turffontein) by 6 lengths and carrying 141lbs	12/27/41
Won	Johannesburg Merchants Handicap (1200m Turffontein) by 0.50 lengths carrying 145lbs	01/01/42
Unpl	Peninsula Summer Handicap (1600m Kenilworth) carrying 141lbs	01/31/42
2nd	Provincial Summer Handicap (2000m Milnerton) beaten a head carrying 149lbs	02/14/42
Unpl	Rosmead Handicap (2000m Kenilworth) carrying 138lbs	02/28/42
2nd	Johannesburg Autumn Handicap (2000m Turffontein) beaten 1.5 lengths carrying 137lbs	04/04/42
Won	Chairman’s Handicap (1600m Turffontein) by 3.5 lengths carrying 143lbs	04/11/42
3rd	A Division Handicap (1000m Clairwood) beaten 2 lengths carrying 146lbs	06/13/42
5th	Durban July Handicap (2100m Greyville) carrying 132lbs, 24 lbs more than the winner	07/04/42
Unpl	Durban Merchants Handicap (1200m Greyville) carrying 136lbs	07/11/42
3rd	Clairwood Winter Handicap (1600m Clairwood) carrying 127lbs	07/18/42
At 5	12 starts 3 wins 1 second 1 third R4 312	1942/43
3rd	Johannesburg Spring Handicap (1600m Turffontein) beaten a neck carrying 139lbs	10/03/42
Won	Spring Goldfields Handicap (2400m Turffontein) by 4 lengths carrying 141lbs	10/05/42
Unpl	Johannesburg Summer Handicap (2000m Turffontein) carrying 142lbs	12/19/42
2nd	Johannesburg Goldfields Handicap (2800m Turffontein) beaten a short head carrying 145lbs	12/26/42
Won	Transvaal Handicap (3200m Turffontein) by 3.50 lengths carrying 145lbs	01/01/43
Unpl	Grandstand Handicap (2000m Gosforth Park) carrying 148lbs	03/06/43
Unpl	A Division Handicap (1000m Gosforth Park) carrying 146lbs	04/10/43
4th	A Division Handicap (1200m Newmarket) carrying 149lbs	04/21/43
Unpl	Johannesburg Winter Handicap (1600m Turffontein) carrying 145lbs	05/31/43
Won	General JJ Pienaar Handicap (320m Turffontein) by 2 lengths carrying 149lbs	06/02/43
Unpl	Goldfields Handicap (2400m Turffontein) carrying 156lbs	06/12/43
Unpl	Victory Handicap (1600m Gosforth Park) carrying 149lbs	06/19/43
At 6	4 starts 2 wins 1 second R1 546	1943/44
Unpl	Johannesburg Spring Handicap (1600m Turffontein) carrying 142lbs	10/02/43
Won	Spring Goldfields Handicap (2400m Turffontein) by 3.50 lengths carrying 150lbs	10/04/43
2nd	Farewell Handicap (1600m Turffontein) beaten a neck carrying 150lbs	10/08/43
Won	West Rand October Handicap (2000m Newmarket) by 0.50 lengths carrying 152lbs	10/20/43
