= Mark Wellesley-Wood =

English businessman (1951–2019)

- Born: Mark Michael Wellesley-Wood; 2 November 1951; England
- Died: 25 April 2019 (aged 67); Dumbarton, Scotland
- Education: St George's College
- Alma mater: Royal School of Mines

Mark Wellesley-Wood (2 November 1951 – 25 April 2019) was an English businessman and mining executive. In South Africa he is best known for his stint as chief executive of Durban Roodepoort Deep between 2000 and 2006.

== Life and career ==
Wellesley-Wood was born in England on 2 November 1951. His father was in the Royal Air Force and he attended St George's College in Weybridge. Thereafter he qualified as a mining engineer at the Royal School of Mines, spent six years in Southern Africa with Anglo American, returned to London to pursue an MBA, and then worked for Investec and Ambrian Partners in London before started his own consultancy.

In 2000, he returned to South Africa, nominated by Mercury Asset Management as non-executive chairman of Durban Roodepoort Deep (DRD). From November that year he additionally was chief executive of the company, initially in an acting capacity. During his subsequent turnaround initiative at DRD, Wellesley-Wood entered into a highly public series of spats with his predecessor, Roger Kebble, and his son Brett Kebble. The Kebbles were thought to be responsible for Wellesley-Wood's unceremonious, but temporary, deportation in 2002. In November 2006, Wellesley-Wood announced that he would retire from his DRD positions at the age of 55, though he said publicly that the board was forcing him out.

Over the next decade, Wellesley-Wood had stints as chief executive of Metallon Corporation's Redwing Mining, as non-executive chairman of Alecto Minerals, and as non-executive chairman of Mwana Africa. His first stint at Mwana, between 2013 and 2014, ended in controversy when the Mwana board accused him of colluding with Ian Hannam's Centar–Meikles to effect a hostile takeover of Mwana. However, he returned to the same position briefly in 2015. At the time of his death he was semi-retired, a financier, and the chief executive of Kefi Minerals, a British mining company.

== Personal life and death ==
He was married to Shona and had three children. They lived in Sussex, England, until September 2018, when they moved to Dumbarton, Scotland pending a permanent move to Alloa. Suffering from depression, Wellesley-Wood committed suicide in Dumbarton on 25 April 2019.
