= Hazel Crane =

South African socialite and businesswoman (1951–2003)

- Born: Hazel Elizabeth Magee; 1951; Belfast, Northern Ireland, UK
- Died: 10 November 2003 (aged 51–52); Abbotsford, Gauteng, South Africa
- Cause of death: Assassination
- Citizenship: United Kingdom; Rhodesia; Zimbabwe; South Africa
- Education: Evelyn Girls' High School, Bulawayo
- Occupations: Socialite, businesswoman, memoirist
- Known for: Prominent socialite in Johannesburg; murder victim
- Spouse(s): Shai Avissar (murdered in 1999); Anthony Crane (died in Rhodesian Bush War; 2 children)

Hazel Crane (1951 – 10 November 2003) was a prominent socialite, businesswoman and posthumous memoirist in South Africa. She was assassinated on 10 November 2003 near her mansion home in the plush northern Johannesburg suburb of Abbotsford – the same suburb in which controversial mining magnate Brett Kebble was murdered in 2005. Crane was killed as she left home to testify against an alleged organised crime boss in a murder trial.

== Early life ==
Born as Hazel Elizabeth Magee in Belfast, Northern Ireland, she emigrated to then Rhodesia as a child and later to South Africa in adult life. In South Africa she was involved in several philanthropic committees and projects, such as the educational sponsorship of poor students.

== Later life ==
Crane was previously married to Anthony Crane, who was killed at age 25 in combat in the Rhodesian Bush War. The couple already had one child, and at the time of her husband's death, Crane was pregnant with their second child. She later had a tumultuous marriage with alleged Israeli mafia boss Shai Avissar. At the time of his murder in 1999, the couple were estranged.

She was a close friend of Winnie Mandela, who attended her funeral and was the chief witness in her wedding to Avissar. Crane accompanied Mandela during her hearings before the Truth and Reconciliation Commission.

== Death and legacy ==
Crane was shot dead in her car in November 2003, while travelling to the Johannesburg High Court to attend the trial of alleged Israeli mafia boss Lior Saat, accused of murdering Crane's estranged husband near Sunninghill, Gauteng in late 1999. Crane had been travelling with a female companion, who was shot in the hand, but police determined that the incident was a "direct attack" on Crane's life, who was shot in the head, leg, chest and arm It later emerged that Crane had been expected to testify in the murder case against Saat, and a source close to Crane said that she knew too much, being able to identify and implicate a number of figures in the Saat murder case. She was the third state witness in the Saat murder trial alleged to be murdered by one of Saat's contacts, John van Loggerenberg, also known as "Johnna". Van Loggerenberg is alleged be an associate of the Sicilian Mafia, an allegation he has neither denied or acknowledged. Police alleged he was behind the murders of Giulio Bascelli and Carlo Binne; Giulio Bascelli was shot in the head in a deserted garage soon after Avassi's death in 2000, while Carlo Binne was shot dead at the Gecko Lounge, a Johannesburg nightclub, in April 2008. The Sicilian Mafia was behind number of high value targets involving attorneys, witnesses and judges. van Loggerenberg was never convicted of any of the murders as there was lack of evidence connecting him to these crimes.

Prior to her death, Crane was working with British journalist David Kray on her memoirs. The biography, Hazel Crane: Testimony from Beyond the Grave received a posthumous release in 2004 and contained several shocking details about the socialite's colorful past. The book details Crane's own secret life of crime. She made her fortune by smuggling diamonds and emeralds, making black-market currency deals, owning a striptease joint and selling hard-core pornography. She also tells of how she entered the underground ring in South Africa and her meeting underground crime boss "Johnna" to discuss security for her and her shipping routes. Prior to her criminal career, she trained as a State Registered Nurse in Rhodesia.

== See also ==
- Crime in South Africa
- List of unsolved murders (2000–present)
- Whites in South Africa
- Whites in Zimbabwe
