= Hannam =

Hannam may refer to:

== People ==
- Edith Hannam (1878–1951), British tennis player
- Ian Hannam (born 1956), British banker
- John Hannam (born 1929), British politician
- Ken Hannam (1929–2004), Australian film and television director
- Walter Henry Hannam (1885-1965), Australian, wireless experimenter, Antarctic expeditioner, member ANZAC Wireless Coy.

== Other ==
- Hannam-dong, a district of Seoul, South Korea
- Hannam station, on the Gyeongui-Jungang Line, South Korea
- Hannam University, a private Christian university in Daejeon, South Korea
- USS Hannam (PF-77), a United States Navy patrol frigate transferred to the United Kingdom while under construction which served in the Royal Navy from 1943 to 1945 as HMS Caicos (K505)
