= Sello Rasethaba =

South African businessman and politician (born 1958)

- Born: February 19, 1958 (age 68); Musina, Limpopo, South Africa

Sello Mashao Rasethaba (born in Musina (then Messina) on 19 February 1958 in Limpopo) is a South African businessman and politician.

Rasethaba is currently an executive director at Mediterranean Shipping Company. It is while serving in this position that Sello immersed himself in port operations and regulatory activities. He has made presentations to the Ports Regulator on Transnet National Port Authority Tariff Applications. Rasethaba is also the Chairman of The Lobbying Corporation of South Africa.

Sello's interests include shipping, transport and logistics in addition to the transformation of both government and business organisations. Sello also claims experience, covering functions involved in the formulation, development and implementation of information technology strategies obtained in the Republic of South Africa, the United States of America and the United Kingdom.

== Professional career and status ==
After completing High School education at Setotolwane High School. Sello worked for Lebowa Transport (now Great North Transport) and resigned to serve Articles of Clerkship with an accounting firm (Mentzel, Rudman & Company) in Polokwane (then Pietersburg). In the early 1980s he served a stint in jail at the Victor Verster Prison where he was held without trial under apartheid security laws. Upon his release, Sello enrolled at the University of the North (now the University of Limpopo) and did not finish his academic programme because of political activism and in 1982 left South Africa for the United States of America. He received a BA with a major in Accounting and German as a minor subject from the University of Northern Iowa in the United States of America. He spent the summer of 1985 in the small Austrian village of St.Radegund furthering his understanding and knowledge of the German language. Sello read for a Masters of Philosophy (Accounting) from the University of Hull in the United Kingdom with the topic, "The role of accountants in the formulation of information technology strategies."

As a student at UNI, Sello worked at International Business Machines Corporation (NYSE: IBM) Software Group in Bloomington, MN. Upon finishing his studies he worked for E. I. du Pont de Nemours and Company (NYSE: DD, DDPRB, DDPRA), commonly referred to as DuPont, an American chemical company in Wilmington, Delaware. In 1987, Sello left the US for Hull in the United Kingdom in 1987. During his studies, Sello was one of the pioneers who started the Black Resource Centre based at Old Library Building, Manchester, England. Upon his return to South Africa, he joined Coopers & Lybrand (now PricewaterhouseCoopers – PwC)) as a management consultant. Until 1999, Sello was a Regional Director at Ernst & Young Management Consulting Services in Johannesburg. He was also the national sales and marketing executive responsible for new business development. Sello established the consultancy, Matodzi Management Advisory Services and later an insolvency practice, GFIA Administrators who were instrumental in the winding up of the Dealstream Securities fraud.

Rasethaba was a member of the first Gauteng Gambling Board of directors and a director of North West Transport. Rasethaba served as chairman of Roads Agency Limpopo from 2009 to the end of 2010, during which time the agency was embroiled in a number of tender-rigging allegations and investigations but the probe did not implicate him in any wrongdoing. He was the chairman of the board of directors of the South African State Information Technology Agency (SITA) from 1999 to May 2002. Sello served as a director and chairman of Saatchi & Saatchi South Africa from January 2002 to November 2010. Sello was also a director of Lexmark International South Africa. In summary, Sello is a lobbyist, business facilitator, insolvency practitioner, entrepreneur and management consultant.

He used to serve on the International Advisory Board of the S.A.G.E. (Students for the Advancement of Global Entrepreneurship) program and was a director of the National Horseracing Authority of Southern Africa until the end of 2011.

== Political allegiances ==
Rasethaba was the leader of the Azanian People's Organisation (Azapo) in the (then) Northern Province of South Africa. He was a committed "Azanian", or so many thought, until he joined the African National Congress (ANC). According to him, he did so because "he could see that was where the money was.". Originally a staunch supporter of Jacob Zuma, during 2011 and 2012 Rasethaba followed the lead of Julius Malema and others in promoting Kgalema Motlanthe to replace Zuma as President of the ANC, but when it became evident, towards the end of 2012, that Julius Malema had lost all power and influence in the ANC, Rasethaba performed yet another about-face to support Zuma once again, brokering an agreement for Fikile Mbalula to support Zuma over Motlanthe at the ANC's 2012 Manguang conference.

Rasethaba was also alleged to be at the apex of a tender rigging triangle that had Julius Malema at one corner and Limpopo Premier Cassel Mathale at the other.

Rasethaba is an important proponent and beneficiary of black economic empowerment in SA. He is also a benefactor to the ANC and the ANC Youth League (ANCYL).

== Significant events and achievements ==
Brett Kebble was driving from Rasethaba's house for dinner on the night that he was shot and killed.
