= Roger Kebble =

South African businessman (1939–2015)

- Born: Roger Ainsley Ralph Kebble; 9 November 1939; Springs, Transvaal; Union of South Africa
- Died: 24 August 2015 (aged 75); Cape Town, South Africa
- Education: St. Andrew's School, Bloemfontein
- Spouse: Julie Kebble (div. 2012)
- Children: 3, including Guy and Brett

Roger Ainsley Ralph Kebble (9 November 1939 – 24 August 2015) was a South African mining magnate.

== Life and career ==
Kebble was born on 9 November 1939 in Springs on the East Rand. After matriculating at St. Andrew's School, Bloemfontein, he began his career as an underground miner. He left the mine at the level of general manager and started his own mine contracting company with around R10,000 borrowed from his mother; in the 1980s, he sold the company to Gencor and took early retirement in Cape Town.

In 1991, however, he returned to the mining industry when he spent R40,000 to take over Rand Leases, a gold mine outside Johannesburg. In 1994, backed by Mercury Asset Management, he and his son Brett Kebble won a controlling interest in Randgold & Exploration, which they went on to unbundle into Harmony, DRDGold, and Randgold Resources. He became chairman of DRD, although he was subsequently sidelined in a public feud with Mercury's Mark Wellesley-Wood. In 2002 he was suspended from DRD and arrested by South African authorities on several counts of fraud and tax fraud. The fraud charges were struck off the roll in 2005, but the tax fraud dispute continued; it was still ongoing at the time of his death in 2015. He stepped away from his remaining executive positions, including his position on the board of Simmer and Jack, in the aftermath of Brett's death in 2005.

== Personal life and death ==
He was married to Julie Kebble until 2012, when they divorced. They had three children: Brett, Guy, and Alison. Suffering from depression, he committed suicide by gunshot on 24 August 2015; his body was found in his Mercedes-Benz in suburban Bishopscourt, Cape Town.
