= Terrance Millard =

South African horse racing trainer (1929–2019)

Personal information
- Nationality: South African
- Born: 15 December 1929 Cape Town, South Africa
- Died: 20 November 2019 (aged 89)
- Occupation: Trainer
- Children: Tony Millard

Horse racing career
- Sport: Horse racing
- Career wins: 2,500+

Significant horses
- Empress Club, Ilustrador, Right Prerogative, Royal Chalice, Occult, Devon Air, Tecla Bluff

Terrance Millard (15 December 1929 – 20 November 2019) was a South African horse racing trainer. He trained over 2,500 winners, including 117 Grade 1 victories, 44 Grade 2 races, and 37 Grade 3 races. He had the most Grade 1 wins, at 117, until that record was surpassed by Mike de Kock in 2018.

He trained six winners of the Durban July Handicap, including six winners of the Metropolitan Handicap and the Gold Cup.

== Biography ==
Terrance Millard was born on 15 December 1929 in Cape Town to an immigrant Welsh couple. He attended school at Rondebosch Boys' High School, before attending Marist Brothers.

Millard became a professional horse racing trainer in 1954, and saddled his first winner on 27 November 1954. He trained his horses at his 12.5 hectare establishment at Bloubergstrand, which hosted over 70 stables. He said the "galloping goldmine", Empress Club, was the greatest horse he ever trained. The Argentinean import won fifteen races, including nine Grade 1 races, which included the Queen's Plate and the Metropolitan Handicap (then known as the J&B Met) in 1993.

Millard and his wife Joyce had been married for 54 years when she died.

He retired in 1991, at the age of 61. He died on 20 November 2019, just one month short of his 90th birthday.

== Competitive history ==
Millard dominated the Durban July Handicap from 1983 to 1990, training six Durban July Handicap winners. On two occasions, his horses filled the top three places. His winners include:

Year	Winner	Age	Jockey	Trainer
1990	Ilustrador	4	Felix Coetzee	Terence Millard
1989	Right Prerogative	4	M. A. Sutherland	Terrance Millard
1988	Royal Chalice	4	Felix Coetzee	Terrance Millard
1986	Occult	5	Bartie Leisher	Terrance Millard
1984	Devon Air	5	Felix Coetzee	Terrance Millard
1983	Tecla Bluff	5	M. A. Sutherland	Terrance Millard
