= Sea Cottage =

South African-bred Thoroughbred racehorse

- Sire: Fairthorn
- Grandsire: Fair Trial
- Dam: Maritime
- Damsire: Merchant Navy
- Sex: Stallion
- Foaled: 1962
- Country: South Africa
- Colour: Bay
- Breeder: Birch Brothers, Vogel Vlei Stud
- Owner: Syd Laird
- Trainer: Syd Laird
- Record: 24 : 20-0-1
- Earnings: R118 128

Major wins
- Festival Juvenile Handicap (1965); Cape Of Good Hope Nursery Futurity (1965); African Breeders' Stakes (1965); Champion Nursery Stakes (1965); Queens Plate (1966, 1967); Guineas Trial Stakes (1966); Cape Derby (1966); Newbury Stakes (1966/1967); South African Guineas (1966); Clairwood Winter Handicap (1966, 1967); Somerset Plate (1967); Gordon's Handicap (1967); Rothmans July Handicap (1967); Champion Stakes (1967); Cutty Sark Invitation Handicap (1967)

Awards
- Champion Two Year Old South Africa (1964/65); Champion Three Year Old South Africa (1965/66); Horse of the Year South Africa (1965/66, 1966/67)

Honours
- South African Equine Hall of Fame (2019); Sea Cottage Stakes (1800m)

Sea Cottage (1962–1987) was a Champion South African bred racehorse. He was the first equine athlete inductee into the South African Hall Of Fame in 2019, and was a Champion in each year that he raced (1964-1967). He was foaled at the Birch Brothers Vogel Vlei Stud in Dordrecht, South Africa. He was trained by Sydney Charles Laird, who also owned him during his racing career. Syd Laird was Champion trainer for 8 seasons in South Africa and the first trainer to be inducted into the South African Hall of Fame in 2019. Sea Cottage won 20 of his 24 starts with 1 third and 3 fourths and earned a record at the time of R118 128. He was humanely destroyed in 1987 at age 25, after complications from a stroke.

== Background ==
Sea Cottage was trained at Summerveld in Kwazulu-Natal, South Africa and raced from December 1964 to August 1967 in South Africa. He won races at all the major racing centres, Cape Town, Durban and Johannesburg and set a record number of stakes races won, 18, and record earnings of R118 128 before he retired to stud in 1967. His record for the number of stakes races won was bested by Sentinel in 1974. He was leased by his breeders the Birch Brothers to Syd Laird for the duration of his racing career. He was ridden in all his starts but one (his second) by Robert (Bobby) Sivewright. His sire Fairthorn headed the South African General Sires List five times, the South African Two Year Old Sires List six times and the South African Broodmare Sires List three times. His dam Maritime produced two other stakes horses in Top Gallant (1960) which won 6 races in South Africa and the United States and Naval Escort (1965) which won 12 races in South Africa. His third dam Drohsky produced another South African Champion racehorse, Lenin.

== Racing career ==
Sea Cottage made his début on 12 January 1964 and had his last race on 26 August 1967. He ran 24 times for 20 wins (18 of which were Stakes races) and 1 third. He was placed 4th in his 3 other starts. He was both Champion Two Year Old (1964/65) and Three Year Old (1965/66) and Horse of the Year/Season in 1965/66 and 1966/67. He retired as the highest stakes earner in South Africa at that time with earnings of R118 128. He won two Queens Plate (Grade 1) over 1600m at Kenilworth the first of which (1966) equalled the race record. He dead-heated for first place in the 1967 Durban July Handicap. He won both the South African Guineas and the Cape Derby. He won from 1000m to 2400m.

He won all of his first 8 starts and all of his last 7 starts. He was involved in one of the most infamous equine shootings in June 1966 when a gunman shot him on his way to a beach walk in Durban, just three weeks prior to his participation in the 1966 Durban July Handicap. The shooting although serious was not career ending and he did race in the Durban July Handicap three weeks later but only managed to finish 4th. His final race was a sell-out at Gosforth Park, Germiston, South Africa which he won comfortably by 5.5 lengths. The bullet was only dislodged and removed from Sea Cottage postmortem.

Racing Record
Age	Starts	Wins	2nds	3rds
At 2	5	5	0	0
At 3	9	7	0	0
At 4	8	6	0	1
At 5	2	2	0	0
	24	20	0	1

== Stud record ==
Sea Cottage retired to stud at his birth place, Vogel Vlei Stud, in 1967, producing his first foal crop in 1968. He bred from 1967 to 1986 with foals born from 1968 through to 1987. He sired 298 foals, 256 of which raced and 160 (15 stakes winners) which were winners, and which won R1 996 027 in prize money. He was second on the South African General Sires List in the 1973/74 season. His best horse was Ocean City which won 16 races (9 Stakes), and placed in another 47 (22 Stakes) in 89 starts. Besides Ocean City who won the Cape of Good Hope Guineas in 1973 and the Champion Nursey Stakes held at Greyville in 1972 he also sired Sea Mist winner of the South African Oaks in 1973, Smugglers Den winner of the 1980 South African Derby and Impressive Style winner of the 1985 Cape of Good Hope Derby. Sea Cottage appeared in the top 10 of the South African Sires List on 7 occasions. He was also the Broodmare sire of Welcome Boy winner of the South African Derby & the South African Guines in 1978 and Stella Maris winner of the 1983 Cape of Good Hope Derby.
