= NHRA (disambiguation) =

NHRA is the National Hot Rod Association, a governing body for drag racing in the U.S. and Canada.

NHRA may also refer to:

- National Health Regulatory Authority (Bahrain)
- National Horseracing Authority, South Africa, officially NHA although sometimes known as NHRA in news reports
- National Heritage Resources Act, the basis for designating National heritage sites of South Africa
