= Chris Warner (cricketer) =

Scottish cricketer

Personal information
- Full name: Christopher John Warner
- Born: 15 January 1945 (age 81); Bloemfontein, Orange Free State, South Africa
- Batting: Left-handed
- Relatives: Edmond Warner (father)

Domestic team information
- Years: Team
- 1978–1984: Scotland

Career statistics
Competition	First-class	List A
Matches	8	12
Runs scored	391	265
Batting average	30.07	22.08
100s/50s	–/4	–/1
Top score	70	59
Catches/stumpings	7/–	5/–
- Source: Cricinfo, 1 July 2022

Christopher John Warner (born 15 January 1945) is a South African-born Scottish former cricketer and field hockey player.

The son of the cricketer Edmond Warner, he was born at Bloemfontein in January 1945. He was educated there at St. Andrew's School. In South Africa, Warner played field hockey at international level for South Africa. After emigrating to Scotland, Warner joined the Grange Cricket Club. Following success at club level, he was selected to play for Scotland in a first-class match against the touring New Zealanders at Dundee in 1978. He played first-class cricket for Scotland until 1984, having made eight appearances, six of which came against Ireland. In these matches, he scored 391 runs at an average of 30.07; he scored four half centuries, with a highest score of 70. In addition to playing first-class cricket for Scotland, Warner also played List A one-day cricket, making his one-day debut against Lancashire at Glasgow in the 1981 Benson & Hedges Cup. He played one-day cricket for Scotland until 1984, making a total of twelve appearances in the Benson & Hedges Cup and the NatWest Trophy. In one-day cricket, he scored 265 runs at an average of 22.08; he scored one half century with a score of 59. For Grange Cricket Club, Warner holds the record for the most runs scored for the club with 10,684.

By profession, Warner was a chartered secretary. Following his retirement, Warner became involved in the administration of the Grange Cricket Club, in addition to being the secretary of the Edinburgh Branch of The Cricket Society. He is currently a trustee and secretary to the Cricket Development Trust (Scotland).
