= Hollywoodbets =

South African sports betting company

- Headquarters: uMhlanga, South Africa
- Area served: South Africa, Mozambique, Ireland, United Kingdom
- Industry: Online gambling
- Services: Online & Mobile betting
- Employees: 6200+
- Website: hollywoodbets.net

Hollywoodbets is a South African sports betting company offering a wide range of betting options, including horse racing, football/soccer, cricket, rugby, tennis, motorsport and more. Hollywoodbets offers over 2400 Lucky Numbers draws a week to bet on (fixed odds betting on lotto draws). Other products offered include Habanero, YGG, PariPlay, Pragmatic Games, Aviator, JetX, Scratch Cards, Betgames Africa, Ezugi, Evolution, Live Instant Win, Jika Sports, and Golden Race.

Hollywoodbets was ranked number 8 on the list of the Top 50 Gaming Sites Worldwide published by iGaming Business Magazine in March 2019.

== Etymology ==
Hollywoodbets’ name was inspired by the racetrack Hollywood Park Racetrack in Los Angeles, United States.

== History ==
Hollywoodbets originally started in 1986 as a small South African based publishing company named Winning Form that handled the publishing and distribution of racecards for South African Horse Racing. Winning Form still publishes racecards for all South African racing.

Hollywoodbets entered the bookmaking industry with the opening of its first betting branch in Argyle Road, Durban in 2000. This was later followed by the opening of the current flagship branch, Hollywood Park in Springfield Park, Durban.

== Countries ==
Hollywoodbets currently operates in four countries. South Africa, Mozambique, Ireland, and the United Kingdom.

Hollywoodbets operates 84 retail branches across South Africa under a number of gaming licences issued by regulators in Gauteng, Western Cape, Eastern Cape, Free State, Limpopo, Mpumalanga, and KwaZulu-Natal.

In November 2018, Hollywoodbets went live with its website in Ireland, making its services available to Irish customers. In March 2019, the company went live with its website in the United Kingdom.

== Sponsorships ==
The company is the current title sponsor of the Hollywoodbets Dolphins cricket team. They started as associate sponsors of the franchise in the 2015/16 season, before becoming the title sponsors in the 2016/17 season.

Hollywoodbets sponsored the KwaZulu-Natal Coastal and KwaZulu-Natal Inland teams for the 2017 Africa T20 Cup. Hollywoodbets KZN Inland went onto win the tournament, after defeating Free State in the final. At the start of the 2018/19 domestic cricket season, Hollywoodbets committed to sponsoring both the KwaZulu-Natal Coastal and the KwaZulu-Natal Inland senior provincial teams for the duration of the season, covering the Africa T20 Cup, 3 Day Cup and 50 Over competition.

Hollywoodbets came on board as the title sponsors of the Murray Cup in 2018. This is a rugby knock-out competition involving clubs from the KwaZulu-Natal Rugby Union.

Hollywoodbets became the title sponsors of the Phaka rugby show on Supersport in February 2019. Hollywoodbets’ new sponsorship relationship with the show will allow the company to assist development rugby teams who desperately need the support and equipment to be able to grow their talented players.

Hollywoodbets sponsored the 2019 COSAFA Cup, which was staged in Durban from 25 May to 8 June 2019.

On Thursday, 27 June 2019, Hollywoodbets was announced as the naming rights sponsor for both Greyville and Scottsville racecourses in a 3-year deal. The racecourses will now be known as Hollywoodbets Greyville Racecourse and Hollywoodbets Scottsville Racecourse.

On Monday, 7 October 2019, Hollywoodbets was announced as the naming rights sponsor for Kingsmead Cricket Ground in a 5-year deal, that would see the commitment run until August 2024.

In February 2020, Hollywoodbets became the official betting partner to LaLiga in South Africa. The partnership included soccer development and community work across underprivileged parts of South Africa, with the focus on making an impact on the game at grassroots levels.

On Sunday, 16 May 2021, Hollywoodbets was announced as the title sponsor of the SAFA National Womens Soccer League, with the tournament being renamed the Hollywoodbets Super League. The Hollywoodbets logo would be shown across the front of all the teams' jerseys for the 2021/22 season.

On Friday, 16 July 2021, Hollywoodbets was announced as the principal partner of Brentford Football Club. The Hollywoodbets logo will be shown across the front of the club's home, away and third shirts throughout the 2021/22 Premier League. The initial deal was signed for a period of two years.

In December 2021, Hollywoodbets acquired the naming rights to Kings Park Rugby Stadium, the home of the Sharks in Durban. The 52 000-seater arena will be known as Hollywoodbets Kings Park from January 2022.

In February 2022, Hollywoodbets took over from Vodacom as the title sponsor of the Durban July Handicap, becoming only the third sponsor in the last 59 years. The sponsorship included an increase in the prize purse for the main race to a record R5 million in stakes. The Hollywoodbets Durban July will take place on Saturday 2 July 2022.

In June 2022, the Council of Southern Africa Football Associations (COSAFA) signed a one-year title sponsorship agreement with Hollywoodbets for the COSAFA Cup, the COSAFA Women’s Championship, the COSAFA Women’s Champions League and the COSAFA Beach Soccer Championship.

On 3 August 2023, Hollywoodbets was announced as the new title sponsor of the Sharks Rugby team. The Hollywoodbets logo will feature prominently on the front and back of The Sharks jerseys across all competitions.

== Social responsibility ==
Every Hollywoodbets branch in South Africa supports a local charity, as well as a local sports team, as part of their Social Responsibility Programme, commonly known as the Hollywoodbets MyCommunity Programme. Included are children's homes, community centers, old-age homes and schools.

With regards to community sports teams, they include soccer teams, cricket teams, rugby and other sports.

In September 2021, Hollywoodbets announced the launch of the Hollywood Foundation. The Hollywood Foundation will operate as a "fully-fledged non-profit organisation that plays an active role in the communities within which it operates." The Foundation works on projects focussing on welfare, education, sports, arts and culture as well as investing in SMMEs.

== Food ==
The Hollywood Bunny Bar branches, under the Hollywoodbets banner, currently consists of 8 branches located in the South African provinces of Gauteng, KwaZulu-Natal, the Eastern Cape and Western Cape. These branches are famous for their authentic Durban curries, and won the award for Best Bunny Chow in 2014 after winning the Bunny Chow Barometer Challenge 2014.

== Brand ambassadors ==
In 2016, former Orlando Pirates and Bafana Bafana soccer player Jerry Sikhosana was named as a brand ambassador for Hollywoodbets. In 2017, former Kaizer Chiefs, Mamelodi Sundowns and Bafana Bafana goalkeeper Brian Baloyi also joined as a brand ambassador for Hollywoodbets.

In 2019, rugby twins Akona Ndungane and Odwa Ndungane joined Hollywoodbets as Brand Ambassadors. The pair are actively involved in Hollywood's partnership with the Phaka rugby programme on SuperSport, as well as initiatives through the twin's Ndungane Foundation.

In March 2020, former South African Champion jockey Anthony Delpech joined on as a brand ambassador for Hollywoodbets. His main role is to assist in managing the Hollywood Syndicate, the horse racing ownership arm of Hollywoodbets.

In April 2020, former South African cricketer Mike Procter joined on as a brand ambassador for Hollywoodbets. Work was done in conjunction with the Mike Procter Foundation, as well as Ottawa Primary School in Durban, where Procter runs the physical education programme.

In 2020, South African-born actress Nomzamo Mbatha joined Hollywoodbets as a brand ambassador. Hollywoodbets works with the actress and her Lighthouse Foundation in various community development and bursary projects.

In December 2021, radio sports talk show host Robert Marawa was introduced as a Hollywoodbets brand ambassador, and appeared in TV commercials and advertisements for the brand.

In February 2022, sports broadcaster Carol Tshabalala, known as South Africa’s "First Lady of Sport", signed as the latest Brand Ambassador for Hollywoodbets.

In November 2022, former South African football captain Teko Modise joined Hollywoodbets as their latest brand ambassador.

In April 2024, Hollywoodbets announced South African rugby player Eben Etzebeth and his actress wife Anlia Star as the newest brand ambassadors for the company.

== Controversies ==
In July 2025, the Advertising Standards Authority upheld a complaint against Hollywoodbets for advertising to minors. The complaint arose from a minor who was presented with the ad, which urged users to sign up to Hollywoodbets and claim promotions, despite having logged their age when registering on the website.

== Awards ==
In 2018 at the Gambling Industry Awards held in South Africa, Hollywoodbets was awarded best Corporate Social Investment (CSI), Best Sports Betting Campaign for 2018, Best Employer of the Year and Best CEO of the Year (Suren Rampersadh).

In 2021, Hollywoodbets was voted as KwaZulu-Natal's Brand of the Year at the Standard Bank KZN Top Business Awards.
