= Felix Coetzee =

South African jockey

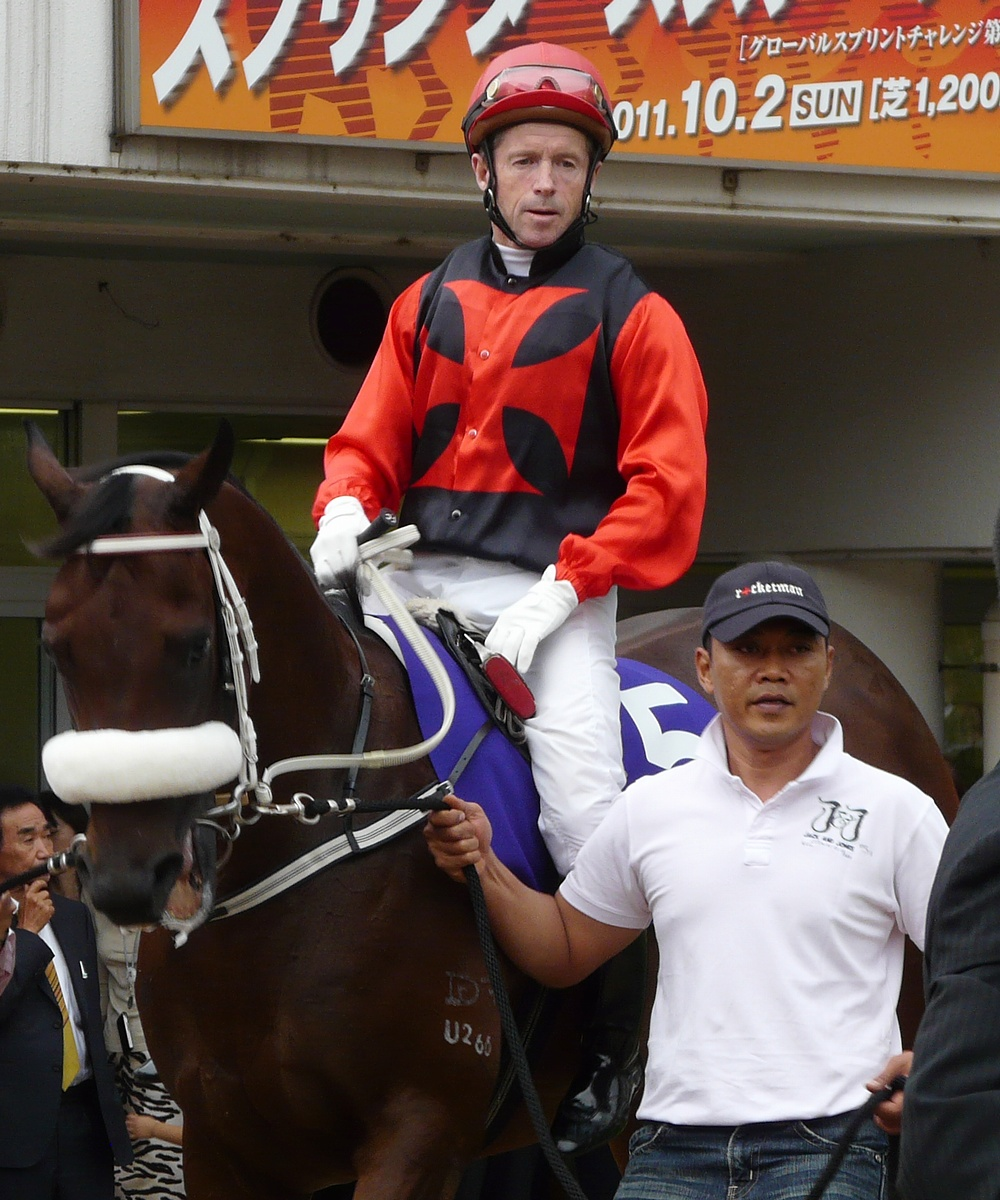
- Felix Coetzee

Personal information
- Born: 7 March 1959 (age 67) Durban, Natal Province, Union of South Africa
- Occupation: Jockey

Horse racing career
- Sport: Horse racing
- Career wins: Ongoing

Major racing wins
- Rothmans July Handicap (1984, 1988, 1990); Greyville Gold Cup (7 times); J&B Metropolitan Stakes (5 times); Hong Kong Sprint (2003, 2004); Hong Kong Mile (2003); Sprinters Stakes (2005); Hong Kong Gold Cup (2004); Hong Kong Derby (2004, 2008); Hong Kong Champions & Chater Cup (2001); Dubai Golden Shaheen (2011)

Racing awards
- Champion South African jockey by wins (1985, 1988, 1990)

Significant horses
- Oriental Express, Silent Witness, Russian Pearl Bullish Luck, Lucky Owners
- Updated on 10 April 2007

Felix Coetzee (born 7 March 1959) is a South African three-time champion jockey in thoroughbred horse racing.

Felix Coetzee is the son of a KwaZulu-Natal trainer and his grandfather was an owner-trainer. As a fifteen-year-old, Felix Coetzee attended the Jockey Academy at Summerveld then served his apprenticeship with his father's racing stable. At age sixteen, he scored his first significant win, riding Kentford to victory in the 1975 Clairwood Winter Handicap. In 1982 he signed on with renowned Cape Town trainer Terence M. Millard with whom he was associated until his retirement in 1991.

== Career ==
During his career, Felix Coetzee has led all South African jockeys in wins three times and has won numerous important South African races. At Greyville Racecourse, he won the country's premier race, the Rothmans July Handicap three times, and the Gold Cup a record-equaling seven times. Coetzee is also a five-time winner of the J&B Metropolitan Stakes at Kenilworth Racecourse.

In 1992, he accepted an offer to ride in Hong Kong for trainer Brian Kan Ping-chee. After five successful years, he switched to riding for trainer David Hill and then in 1999 with Tony Cruz with whom he earned numerous Group One wins most notably aboard the three-time World Champion Sprinter, Silent Witness.
