= Abbotsford, Johannesburg =

Abbotsford
- Location within Gauteng Location within South Africa
- Coordinates: 26.143°S 28.066°E
- Country: South Africa
- Province: Gauteng
- Municipality: City of Johannesburg
- Main Place: Johannesburg
- Established: 1902

Area
  - Total: 0.50 km^{2} (0.19 sq mi)

Population (2011)
  - Total: 388
  - Density: 780/km^{2} (2,000/sq mi)

Racial makeup (2011)
  - Black African: 35.8%
  - Coloured: 1.8%
  - Indian/Asian: 4.4%
  - White: 57.5%
  - Other: 0.5%

First languages (2011)
  - English: 67.4%
  - Zulu: 9.3%
  - Tswana: 6.2%
  - Southern Ndebele: 3.3%
  - Other: 13.9%
- Time zone: UTC+2 (SAST)
- Postal code (street): 5241

Abbotsford is a suburb of Johannesburg, South Africa. This suburb lies north-east of the Johannesburg CBD next to Oaklands, Highlands North and Melrose. It is located in Region E of the City of Johannesburg Metropolitan Municipality.

== History ==
It was established in 1902 and the suburb is named after Sir Walter Scott's house called Abbotsford a historic country house in the Scottish Borders, near Melrose, on the south bank of the River Tweed.

In the early 2000s prominent public figures Hazel Crane and Brett Kebble were murdered in the suburb.
