= Kingsmead Cricket Ground =

Cricket ground

Hollywoodbets Kingsmead Stadium
- Kingsmead
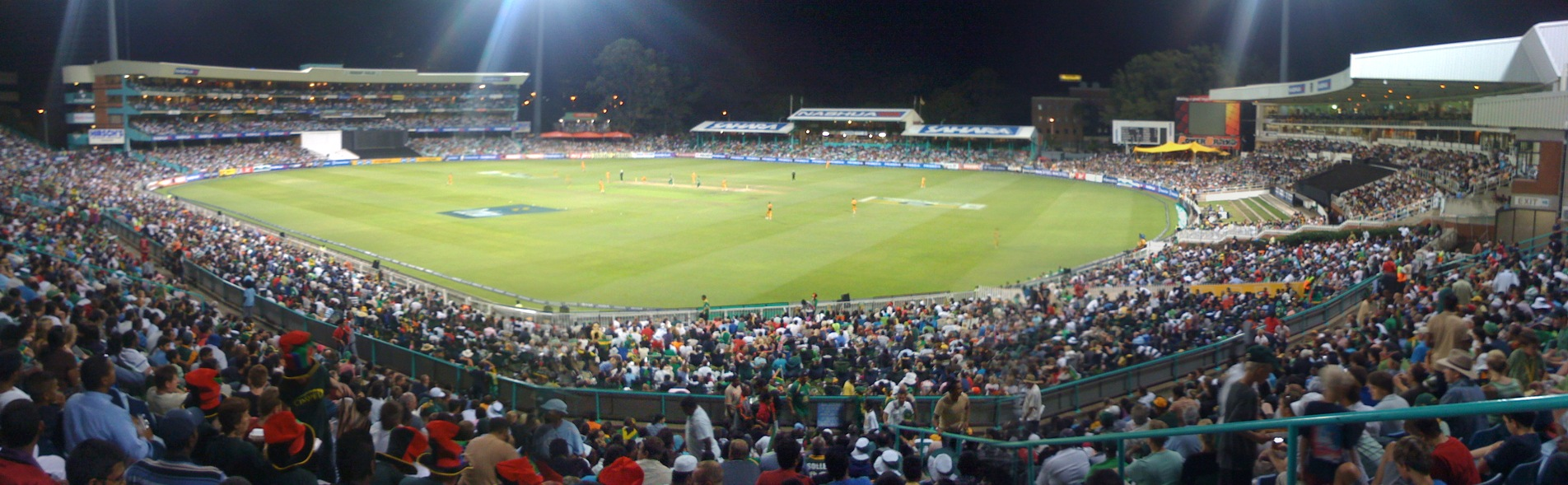
- Panoramic view of the Kingsmead
- Interactive map of Hollywoodbets Kingsmead Stadium

Ground information
- Location: Durban, South Africa
- Country: South Africa
- Coordinates: 29°51′0″S 31°1′40″E
- Capacity: 25,000
- Tenants: Dolphins
- End names
- Umgeni End; Old Fort End

International information
- First men's Test: 18–22 January 1923: South Africa v England
- Last men's Test: 9–13 October 2026: South Africa v Australia
- First men's ODI: 17 December 1992: South Africa v India
- Last men's ODI: 24 September 2026: South Africa v Australia
- First men's T20I: 12 September 2007: Kenya v New Zealand
- Last men's T20I: 10 December 2024: South Africa v Pakistan
- First women's Test: 31 December 1960–3 January 1961: South Africa v England
- Last women's Test: 10–13 March 1972: South Africa v New Zealand
- First women's ODI: 20 January 2021: South Africa v Pakistan
- Last women's ODI: 1 October 2023: South Africa v New Zealand
- First women's T20I: 4 March 2016: South Africa v West Indies
- Last women's T20I: 3 February 2021: South Africa v Pakistan

Team information
Hollywoodbets Dolphins	(1923–present)
Durban Heat	(2018-2019)
Durban's Super Giants	(2023–present)
- As of 11 October 2026; Source: Cricinfo

Kingsmead Cricket Ground is a cricket ground in Durban, KwaZulu-Natal, South Africa. Its stated capacity is 25,000, although grass terracing makes up part of the viewing area. The 'end names' are the Umgeni End (north) and the Old Fort Road End (south). It is the home ground of the Dolphins.

In October 2019, Hollywoodbets was announced as the naming rights sponsor of the ground, which is now known as Hollywoodbets Kingsmead Stadium until August 2024.

== Cricket ==
The venue hosted the first home Test for the South African cricket team after re-admission into international cricket and also hosted the Test against the English cricket team in 1939, which lasted from the third to the thirteenth of March and was called off over fears that the English would miss their ship home.

The first Test match to be played here was between South Africa and England on 18 January 1923, which resulted in a draw on the 5th day.

It has been renowned as a seamers wicket, and there is also a famous myth regarding how the tide affects batting conditions, as the ground is quite close to the beach. Many batting collapses in matches in the past have jokingly been blamed on changes in the tide.

On 19 September 2007 the ground witnessed Yuvraj Singh's iconic six consecutive sixes off Stuart Broad's over in the World Twenty20 match between India and England, to mark the fastest fifty ever in any form of cricket.

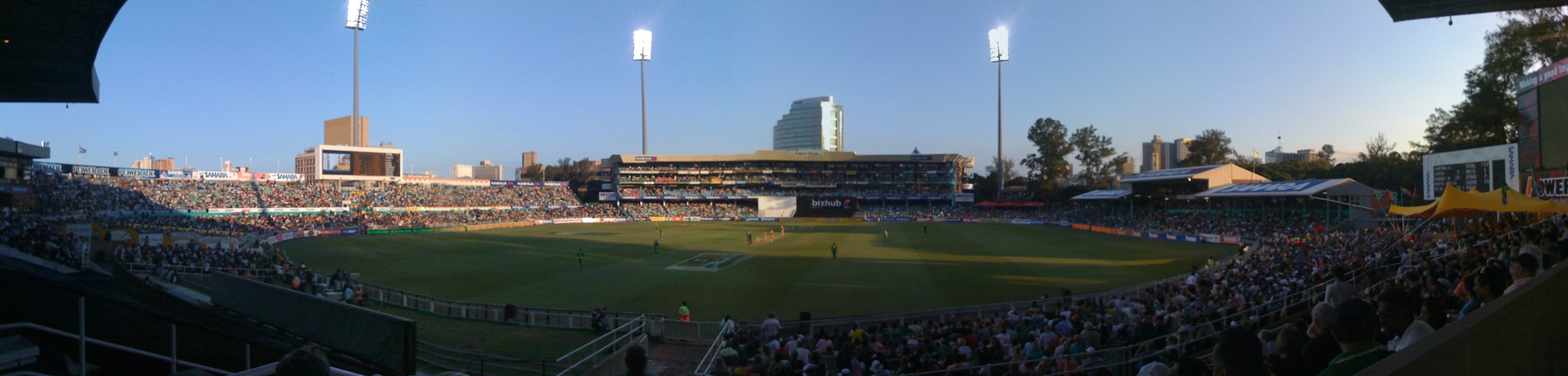
A panoramic view of the Kingsmead during South Africa vs Australia in 2009

== See also ==
- List of Test cricket grounds
