= Murray Cup =

- Current season or competition: 2019 Hollywoodbets Murray Cup
- Sport: Rugby union Rugby
- Instituted: 1890
- Inaugural season: 1890
- Number of teams: Premier Division: 8 First Division: 8
- Country: South Africa
- Holders: College Rovers (2019)
- Website: Sharks Rugby
- Related competition: Moore Cup

The Murray Cup is a rugby union club knockout competition which takes places in KwaZulu-Natal, and is affiliated with the KwaZulu-Natal Rugby Union (KZNRU).

== History ==
The Murray Cup was founded in 1890, and is named after Sir TK Murray. Murray was appointed in June 1890 as the first President of the Natal Rugby Union, which today is known as the KwaZulu-Natal Rugby Union. He presented the union with its first trophy, The Murray Cup. The trophy was to be used for a challenge/knockout competition.

The Murray Cup is now the oldest knockout rugby competition in World Rugby.

== Sponsors ==
In 1957, South African Breweries came on board as sponsors, and the competition was renamed to the SAB Murray Cup. The sponsorship continued until 2016. There was no title sponsor in 2017.

In 2018, Hollywoodbets were announced as title sponsors of the Murray Cup. The competition is now known as the Hollywoodbets Murray Cup.

== Rule changes ==
In 2018, the following rule changes were implemented to increase the pace and excitement of the game.

- No kicking outside of your own 22 m for the first 10 minutes of each half;
- Tries scored under the poles do not require a conversion (automatic 7 points);
- Conversions must be taken within 30 seconds;
- One strategic break per half, meaning there will be four 20-minute quarters to the game;
- Each squad will comprise 25 players.

The tournament format saw the eight 1st Division teams, host the Premier Leagues teams in the qualifying rounds. The losing team from this round would then take part in the Junior Murray Cup.

== Participating teams ==
The teams participating in the 2019 Hollywoodbets Murray Cup are:

Premier Division:

- Amanzimtoti Rugby Club
- College Rovers
- Crusaders
- Durban Collegians
- Richards Bay Rugby Club
- UKZN Pietermaritzburg Impi
- Varsity College
- Westville Old Boys

First Division:

- Drakensberg
- Hillcrest Villagers
- Newcastle Highlanders
- Piet Retief Rugby Club
- South Coast Warriors
- UKZN Durban Impi
- Volksrust Rugby Club
- Vryheid Rugby Club

== Past winners ==
Below is a list of all the previous winners of the Murray Cup, since its inauguration in 1890.

College Rovers are the current defending champions.

Teams with the most Murray Cup tournament wins.
Team	Titles	Alternative Team name
Durban Collegians	33	
College Rovers	21	Durban Rovers, Berea Rovers
Glenwood Old Boys	10	
Wasps	8	
Maritzburg Collegians	7	
Maritzburg Police	5	
Crusaders	4	
DHS Old Boys	4	
New Zealanders	3	
West Riding	3	
York & Lancaster	3	
Ladysmith	2	
Wanderers Durban	2	
Amanzimtoti	1	
Durban RFC	1	
Harlequins	1	
Hilton College	1	
Railways (PMB)	1	
Savages	1	
Volksrust	1	
Zululand Rhinos	1	

Year	Winner	Semi-Finalists	Score	Note
1890	Savages			
1891	York & Lancaster			
1892	York & Lancaster			
1893	Maritzburg Wanderers			
1894	York & Lancaster			
1895	West Riding			
1896	West Riding			
1897	West Riding			
1898	Hilton College			
1899	Durban RFC	Wanderers PMB	3 - 0	
1900	Old Collegians (Maritzburg College)	Durban Rovers	9 - 3	
1901	Wasps (PMB)	Durban Rovers	11 - 3	
1902	Maritzburg Wanderers	Wasps (PMB)	12 - 6	
1903	Wasps (PMB)	Durban Rovers	6 - 3	
1904	New Zealanders	Durban Rovers		
1905	New Zealanders	Durban Rovers		
1906	New Zealanders	Durban Rovers		
1907	Old Collegians (Durban)	Durban Rovers	6 - 0	
1908	Old Collegians (PMB)	Durban Rovers	11 - 0	
1909	Durban Rovers	Wasps (PMB)	3 - 0	
1910	Wasps (PMB)	Durban Rovers	3 - 0	
1911	Wasps (PMB)	Durban Rovers	3 - 0	
1912	Old Collegians (Durban)	Wanderers (Durban)	12 - 9	
1913	Durban Rovers	Old Collegians (Durban)	12 - 3	
1914	Old Collegians (Durban)	Durban Rovers	15 - 9	
1915-19	FIRST WORLD WAR			
1920	Kokstad	Maritzburg Collegians		
1921	Wasp Wanderers (PMB)	Durban Rovers		
1922	Old Collegians	Wasp Wanderers		
1923	Old Collegians	Durban Rovers		
1924	Old Collegians	Durban Rovers		
1925	Durban Rovers	Durban Collegians		
1926	Old Collegians	Durban Rovers		
1927	Ladysmith	Maritzburg Collegians		
1928	Old Collegians	Durban Rovers	14 - 9	
1929	Old Collegians	Durban Rovers	10 - 3	
1930	Natal University College (PMB)	Durban Rovers	9 - 6	
1931	Tech College	Durban Rovers		
1932	Tech College	Old Collegians	9 - 6	
1933	DHS Old Boys	Durban Collegians	9 - 3	
1934	Old Collegians	DHS Old Boys	12 - 9	
1935	Police (PMB)	Durban Rovers	10 - 6	
1936	Police (PMB)	Durban Rovers		
1937	Old Collegians	Police (PMB)		
1938	Police (PMB)	Old Collegians		
1939	Police (PMB)	Durban Rovers		
1940	Police (PMB)	Maritzburg Collegians		
1941-45	SECOND WORLD WAR			
1946	Wasp Wanderers (PMB)	Berea Rovers	10 - 3	
1947	Wasp Wanderers (PMB)	Berea Rovers	11 - 8	
1948	Berea Rovers	Wasps	9 - 6	
1949	Wanderers (DBN)	Wasps	12 - 3	
1950	Wasp Wanderers (PMB)	Wanderers (DBN)	10 - 6	
1951	Wasp Wanderers (PMB)	Railway PMB	16 - 10	
1952	Railways (PMB)	Berea Rovers	6 - 0	
1953	Wanderers (DBN)	Maritzburg Police	12 - 9	
1954	Berea Rovers	Maritzburg Police	20 - 9	
1955	Volksrust	Ladysmith	9 - 3	
1956	Durban Collegians	Wanderers (DBN)	12 - 3	
1957	Wanderers (DBN)	Durban Collegians	12 - 9*	Game decided in extra-time
1958	Durban Collegians	Glenwood Old Boys	12 - 6	
1959	Durban Collegians	Glenwood Old Boys	15 - 3	
1960	Glenwood Old Boys	Maritzburg Collegians	18 - 10	
1961	Maritzburg Collegians	Durban Collegians		
1962	Durban Collegians	Maritzburg Collegians		
1963	Durban Collegians	Glenwood Old Boys		
1964	Glenwood Old Boys			
1965	Ladysmith			
1966	Durban Collegians			
1967	Glenwood Old Boys			
1968	Glenwood Old Boys			
1969	Glenwood Old Boys			
1970	Glenwood Old Boys			
1971	Berea Rovers			
1972	Durban Collegians			
1973	Durban Collegians			
1974	Durban Collegians			
1975	Glenwood Old Boys			
1976	Glenwood Old Boys			
1977	Durban Collegians			
1978	Durban Collegians			
1979	Durban Collegians			
1980	Maritzburg Collegians			
1981	Durban Collegians			
1982	Durban Collegians			
1983	Maritzburg Collegians			
1984	Glenwood Old Boys			
1985	Durban Collegians			
1986	Durban Collegians			
1987	Durban Collegians			
1988	Durban Collegians			
1989	DHS Old Boys			
1990	DHS Old Boys			
1991	DHS Old Boys			
1992	Collegians Tech			
1993	Crusaders			
1994	Crusaders			
1995	Crusaders			
1996	College Rovers			
1997	DHS Old Boys			
1998	Collegians Tech			
1999	Harlequins			
2000	College Rovers	Crusaders	24 - 20	
2001	Durban Collegians	College Rovers	27 - 3	
2002	Durban Collegians	Glenwood Falcons	34 - 22	
2003	Crusaders	Jaguars	37 - 25	
2004	College Rovers	DHS Old Boys	76 - 3	
2005	College Rovers	Glenwood Falcons	34 - 22	
2006	College Rovers	Durban Collegians	45 - 15	
2007	College Rovers	Crusaders	25 - 20	
2008	Zululand Rhinos	Crusaders	22 - 18	
2009	College Rovers	DHS Old Boys	24 - 24	34 - 34 (Won on better Try count)
2010	College Rovers	DHS Old Boys	30 - 14	
2011	College Rovers	Durban Collegians	58 - 12	
2012	College Rovers	Crusaders	27 - 20	
2013	College Rovers	Durban Collegeians	15 - 15	Won on better Try count
2014	Amanzimtoti	Varsity College	21 - 21	24 - 21 after Extra Time
2015	College Rovers	Crusaders	55 - 20	
2016	Durban Collegians	Amanzimtoti	13 - 13	31 - 13 after Extra Time
2017	College Rovers	Durban Collegians	24 - 13	
2018	College Rovers	Durban Collegians	17 - 17	Won on better Try count
2019	College Rovers	Durban Collegians	32 - 32	44 - 42 after Extra Time
