= S'manga Khumalo =

South African jockey

Personal information
- Born: November 29, 1985 (age 40) KwaMashu, South Africa
- Occupation: Jockey

Horse racing career
- Sport: Horse racing
- Career wins: ongoing

Major racing wins
- Durban July Handicap (2013)

Significant horses
- Heavy Metal
- Updated on August 11, 2013

S'manga Khumalo (born 29 November 1985) is a South African Thoroughbred horse racing jockey. He is a member of the Jockey Association of South Africa.

In 2013 Khumalo became the first black jockey to win the Durban July Handicap, South Africa's top horse race, on his steed Heavy Metal at age 28.

S'manga Khumalo's family is from KwaMashu township near Durban, South Africa. He saw a horse for the first time when he was fourteen years old.

== Suspension ==
The National Horseracing Authority of Southern Africa on the 23rd March 2026 announced Khumalo was to be suspended pending an investigation into unspecified claims of gambling impropriety. Another jockey, Luyolo Mxothwa, was also suspended. An enquiry will be heard in April 2026.
