= Gold Cup at Greyville =

Gold Cup
- Class: Grade 3
- Location: Greyville Racecourse; Durban, South Africa
- Inaugurated: 1920
- Race type: Flat / Thoroughbred
- Website: Gold Cup

Race information
- Distance: 3200m (1m 7f 200y)
- Surface: Turf
- Track: Right-handed
- Qualification: Open
- Weight: WFA: 3yrs-11.5kgs; 4yrs-2kgs
- Purse: R400,000 (2020); 1st: R250,000

The Gold Cup is a Grade 3 thoroughbred horse race run over 3200m at Greyville Racecourse in Durban, South Africa. The first running of the race took place in 1920 however it was not run in 1942. The race is considered "Africa’s premier marathon for long-distance runners." The race historically takes place on the last weekend of July, which coincides with the end of the racing season.

This was previously a Grade 1 race, until it was downgraded to a Grade 2 in 2016, and then Grade 3 in 2017.

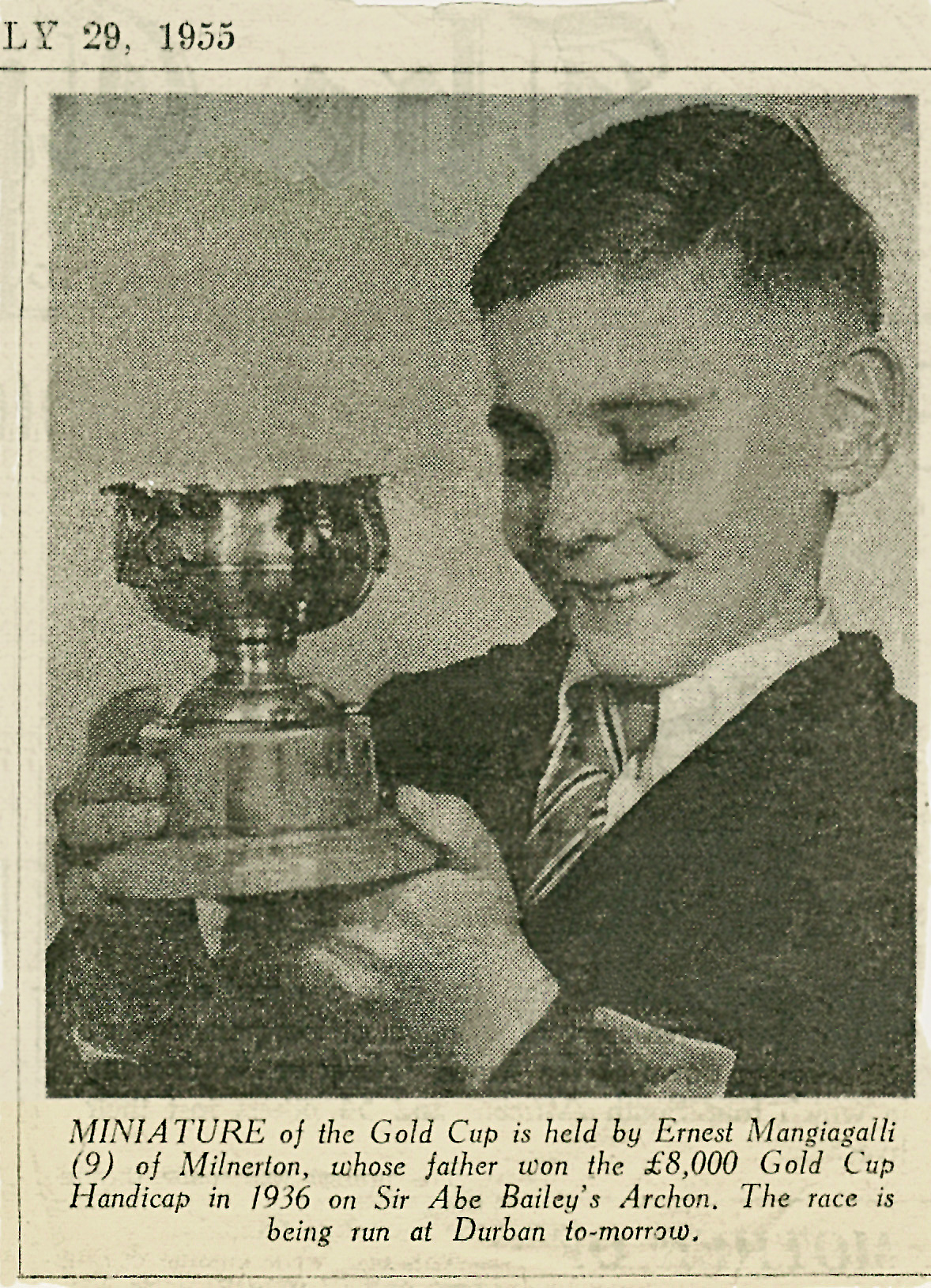
Miniature Greyville Gold Cup

== Most Winners ==
Jockey Felix Coetzee has won the most Gold Cups with 8. He equalled Charlie Barends record of 7 winners in 1998, before breaking it in 2012.

== Past winners ==
Year	Winner	Trainer	Jockey	Age	Wgt
2019	Dynasty's Blossom	Ramsden J	Juglall N	4	55.0
2018	It's My Turn	Kannemeyer D	Marcus A	5	59.5
2017	Hermoso Mundo	Marwing Weiho	Marwing Weichong	4	56.0
2016	Enaad (Aus)	De Kock M F	Khumalo S	4	53.5
2015	Wild One	De Kock M F	Delpech A	6	55.0
2014	Wavin' Flag	Crawford B	Hatt G	4	53.0
2013	Jeppe's Reef	Bass M W	Fradd R	5	54.5
2012	In Writing	Kannemeyer D	Coetzee F	6	57.5
2011	Aslan	Tarry S G	Lerena G	5	57.5
2010	Ancestral Fore	De Kock M F	Shea K	3	56.0
2009	Mokaro	Page S H	Fourie R	6	56.5
2008	Desert Links	Marcus B	Cheyne G	5	57.0
2007	Thundering Star	De Kock M F	Geroudis J	4	57.0
2006	Diamond Quest	Bass M W	Lloyd J	5	50.0
2005	Reveille Boy	Crawford B	Strydom P	6	54.0
2004	Major Bluff	Ramsden J	Hatt G	5	51.5
2003	Highland Night	Drier D R	Hill R	6	52.5
2002	Highland Night	Maroun K R	Forbes A	5	50.5
2001	Cereus	Greeff A	Randolph S	5	52.0
2000	Colonial Girl	Kannemeyer D	Hatt G	5	50.0
1999	Place Of Gold	Shaw P B	Hill R	4	52.5
1998	Bella Bianca	Millard A T	Coetzee F	5	53.5
1997	Sciantiso	Aldous RT	Macaskill F	7	53.5
1996	Festive Forever	Millard A T	Coetzee F	6	53.0
1995	Milleverof	Payne D	Hatt G	6	53.0
1994	Stateway	Miller A	Hoffman A	7	53.0
1993	Space Walk	Maingard M. H.	Lloyd J	5	53.0
1992	Floating Casino	Marshall V	Fradd R	6	52.5
1991	Icona	Payne D	Marcus A	6	50.0
1990	Illustrador	Millard T	Coetzee F	4	55.5
1989	Tropicante	Rixon R	Wynne P	4	54.0
1988	Castle Walk	Millard T	Coetzee F	3	49.5
1987	Aquanaut	Watters M	Howes G	4	53.0
1986	Occult	Millard T	Coetzee F	5	55.5
1985	Voodoo Charm	Millard T	Coetzee F	4	52.0
1984	Devon Air	Millard T	Coetzee F	6	56.0
1983	Hawkins	Millard T	Sutherland M	4	56.5
1982	Equilateral		Marcus B	4	54.0
1981	Brave Persian		Kotzen G	5	51.5
1980	Furious	Upton A	Hayden B	6	58.0
1979	The Maltster	Cooper B	Macaskill F	7	53.5
1978	Fauvist		Uys M	6	46.5
1977 - DH	DH - Don The Stripe		Roberts M	6	50.5
1977 - DH	DH - Pacer		Deyes B	4	49.5
1976	Hedge		Marcus B	6	46.6
1975	Numerator		Stevens A	7	56.0
1974	Armistice		Cave M	4	48.5
1973	Jacobite		Byrnes J	5	45.0
1972	Humdinger		Roberts R	3	48.0
1971	Rainstorm		Roberts M	4	45.0
1970	Rack And Ruin		Cave M	5	45.0
1969	Golden Jewel		Schoeman M	5	50.0
1968	Caradoc		Schoeman M	5	54.0
1967	Cuff Link		Alexander D	a	52.5
1966	Smash And Grab		Bailey I	4	49.5
1965	Cuff Link		Taylor A	5	49.0
1964	New Chief		Barends C	7	52.5
1963	Jerez		Amos S	6	57.5
1962	Speciality		Lange T	5	50.5
1961	Cairn Feast		Stuart G	5	50.0
1960	Lucky Coin		Taylor A	5	47.0
1959	Cumanus		De La Rey S	4	
1958	Avalanche			6	
1957	Excise			4	
1956	Phantom King			5	
1955	Sky Finch			3	
1954	Coquimbo		Barends C	a	
1953	Eros		Barends C	5	
1952	Exeter Chimes			a	
1951	Lady's Mon			5	
1950	Chez Monty		Barends C	5	
1949	Chez Monty		Barends C	4	
1948	Lochiel			6	
1947	His Lordship		Barends C	5	
1946	Cushat			6	
1945	Solomon			4	
1944	Ascalabus			a	
1943	St Seiriol			6	
1942	Race Not Run			NA	
1941	What Next		Barends C	5	
1940	What Next			4	
1939	Tohunga			4	
1938	Flyaway			5	
1937	Shortridge			4	
1936	Archon		Mangiagalli E	18	42.6
1935	Humidor			a	
1934	Aristocrat IV			5	
1933	Humidor			5	
1932	Rinmaher			5	
1931	Le Vin Chaud			4	
1930	Artist Glow			a	
1929	Bicarbonite			6	
1928	Polybasite			5	
1927	Intervention			a	
1926	Sun Lad			6	
1925	Entangler			5	
1924	Royal Rufus			5	
1923	Freshfield			a	
1922	Longdon			6	
1921	Tower Bridge			5	
1920	Comely Lad			7	

== Sponsors ==
The race is sponsored by Marshalls World of Sport since the 2021 running of the Gold Cup. It is subsequently now called the Marshalls World Of Sport Gold Cup. Previous sponsors include eLAN Property Group (2014-2019), Ladbrokes (2012), Canon (2002-2011), Natal Wholesale Jewellers and Game.
