= St. Andrew's School, Bloemfontein =

Coordinates: 29°06′13″S 26°12′14″E

St Andrew's School
- Bloemfontein, Free State; South Africa

Information
- Type: All-Boys Public School
- Motto: Fiat Lux (Let There Be Light)
- Established: 1863
- School district: Motheo District
- Headmaster: Roland Rudd
- Chaplain: Father Ashe Steenbok
- Grades: 000 - 12
- Colours: Royal blue and white
- Nickname: Saints
- Boarding Houses: Chandler, Twells, Storey, Dunn
- Day Student Houses: Clegg, Mckenzie, Champion
- Affiliation: Anglican Church of Southern Africa
- Website: www.sasb.co.za

St Andrew's School, established in 1863 is a public school for boys located in Bloemfontein, Free State, South Africa.

The years of study are from pre-primary Grade 000 to grade 12. Boarders are accommodated in four boarding hostels: Dunn House for junior boarders, Storey House for junior secondary boarders, and Twells and Chandler Houses for senior boarders.

Day students are associated with Mckenzie (Red), Clegg (Blue) and Champion (Yellow)

Its sister school is St. Michael's School, a girls' school which is located nearby in Bloemfontein.

The school is the second oldest in Bloemfontein, behind Grey College and is amongst the oldest in the country.The St Andrew's Chapel celebrates its 70th anniversary on 26 February 2026, having been consecrated on the 26th February 1956.

== History ==
St Andrew's was founded on 16 November 1863 by Bishop Edward Twells as the Diocesan Grammar School, and was located in a building now known as the Old Raadsaal in St George's Street, Bloemfontein. The first headmaster was George Clegg.

In 1874 the school was renamed St Andrew's School when it moved to new buildings on the corner of St George's Street and Church Street. The headmaster at this time was the Reverend Douglas McKenzie. The foundation stone of the first St Andrew's is preserved alongside the current chapel.

In March 1899 new buildings were built for the school; these were however only occupied for a few months before being requisitioned by the British Army during the South African War and the school closed.

At the conclusion of hostilities in 1902, the facilities were appropriated for use by the new Oranje Meisiesskool/Orange Girls School, which still occupies the premises.

Bishop Arthur Chandler worked for a number of years to reinstate the school, and the school reopened in January 1916 on its present site on General Dan Pienaar Drive. Canon E. Ford served as headmaster until the end of 1916.

Francis Storey served as headmaster from 1917 until 1946.

== Headmasters ==
=== Headmasters from 1863-1899 ===
- 1863 - 1868, Mr George Clegg
- 1869 - 1871, The Rev. Charles Clulee
- 1872, Mr E.W. Stenson
- 1872 - 1873, The Rev. John Widdicombe
- 1873 - 1879, The Rev. Douglas McKenzie
- 1880 - 1883, The Rev. Arthur Borton
- 1884 - 1885, The Rev. Hon. Albert Lyttelton
- 1885 - 1886, The Rev. Charles Scratchely
- 1886 - 1887, The Rev. Barron Moore
- 1888 - 1894, The Rev. John Bell
- 1895 - 1899, The Rev. Horace Orford

=== Headmasters in the modern era (1916 to current) ===
- 1916, Canon E. Ford
- 1917 - 1946, Mr F. W. "Oubaas" Storey
- 1947 - 1957, Mr E. L. Harrison
- 1957 - 1967, Mr N. C. H. "Jumbo" Ferrandi
- 1968 - 1974, Mr B. Thiel
- 1974 - 1984, Mr W. I. O. Patterson
- 1985 - 2006, Mr R. A. "Flash" Gordon
- 2006 - 2007, (Acting) Mr J. E. Bridger (Old Andrean)
- 2007 - 2020, Mr C. Thomas (Old Andrean)
- 2021 - 2021, (Acting) Mr A. Forster
- 2021 (August) - Mr R. H. Rudd

== Governance and ethos ==
St Andrew's was originally a private school controlled by a board of governors chaired by the Anglican Bishop of Bloemfontein. In 1976, the school was sold to the Orange Free State Provincial Administration (PAO), on condition that it could retain its Anglican character. It is now deemed by the Free State Department of Education to be an Independent school and is registered with the Independent Schools Association of Southern Africa.

The Bishop of Bloemfontein maintains a seat on the School Governing Body to this day.

The school maintains links with a number of independent schools in South Africa, participating in the annual Independent Schools Rugby and Cricket festivals and has derby day fixtures with St John's College and Cornwall Hill.

== Construction in the 1980s ==
A cornerstone of the negotiations resulting in the sale of the school to the PAO was that the PAO would institute a significant capital works program at the school, in respect of upgrading and expansion of existing buildings, and the construction of new boarding hostels.

The project commenced in 1985 with the demolition of the sanatorium, adjacent to the then Storey House. The new (current) Chandler/Twells block was built on this site.

Simultaneously, upgrading and refurbishment of the Ferrandi Block (senior school buildings) and Dunn House (integrated junior school and junior boarding facilities) was undertaken.

At the end of 1986 the old Chandler/Twells block (dating back to the early 1920s) was demolished to make way for the new Storey and Dunn blocks, prep room, sanatorium complex, a number of accommodation units for masters and a walkway linking the three boarding units with the Champion Hall (dining facility for boarders). Chandler and Twells Cottages, providing accommodation for the masters of the respective boarding blocks, were retained.

The bulk of construction was completed in time for the 125th anniversary of the founding of the school, in 1988.

On conclusion, the former Dunn House was renamed Jagger Block, a title dating back to its construction in 1952.

The former Storey House was converted to common room facilities for the senior boarding houses, and more latterly, as the premises of the pre-primary school. It was renamed the Roy Gordon Academic Centre in 2008.

Oubaas Storey's House, home to the school chaplain until the completion of new Dunn House, was transformed into a museum and visitor's centre.

A plaque highlighting the efforts of Mr. Patterson towards initiating the project, and commemorating the completion thereof, may be seen at the Dunn House common room.

== Other significant buildings on campus ==
- Harison House - headmaster's home
- Champion Hall - boarders' dining room and adjacent multi-purpose annexe, 1925
- Centenary Hall - completed in 1963, hosts drama productions, annual speech day, examinations and dances
- Walter Carey Library - within the Ferrandi Block precinct, 1938
- Bailey Hall - adjacent to Ferrandi Block, hosts examinations and gymnasium facilities, 1929
- Staff flats - accommodation units, late 1950s
- Coaker Gates - representing the links between St Andrew's and St Michael's Schools
- Twells Bells - fragments of disused railway line suspended from chains, used as time bells in the old Twells House, re-installed in a purpose-built structure
- Circular Memorial - built in honour of the 130th anniversary of the founding of the school, 1993
- Waterless Olympic Standard Astro Turf opened in March 2024
- Lindsay Tuckett High Performance Indoor Cricket Centre
- Little Saints Pre Primary Complex

== Chapel ==
The foundation stone of the structure was laid in 1955, and the chapel was consecrated in 1956.The St Andrew's Chapel celebrates its 70th anniversary on 26 February 2026, having been consecrated on the 26th February 1956.

The chapel is designed in the traditional cathedral fashion and comprises a large nave, with a pipe organ and choir stalls at the rear (west end), transepts including the vestry on one side, the lay chapel on the other, and the sanctuary, which is raised, (and takes the form of a quarter sphere) and houses the altar. Communion is taken at the top step of the sanctuary.

Each school day commences with a short service of prayer in the chapel, and traditional Anglican services are conducted on Sundays at 09:00 which are open to the community.

The chapel observes the rites and festivals of the Anglican church.

The current school chaplain is Father Ashe Steenbok.

The accomplished school choir plays an important part in the activities of the chapel. The current Master of Choristers is Mr Shaun Prins.

== Sports facilities ==
- Vossie's Field (and pavilion), named for Mr H. D. "Vossie" Vorster who served the school with distinction between 1940 and 1983, both as teacher and Master in Charge of 1st XI cricket - principal turf cricket wicket and oval (summer), twin hockey fields (winter)
- Hickling Field (and pavilion), named for Colin Hickling (Old Andrean) - rugby field (winter), secondary turf cricket wicket and oval (summer)
- Chapel Field - turf cricket wicket and oval (summer), twin soccer pitches (winter)
- Tennis courts
- Squash courts
- Swimming pool
- Floodlit Soccer/Cricket/Rugby Pitch
- World Class waterless Astro Turf (Cabbage Patch)
- The Lindsay Tuckett High Performance Centre primarily used for cricket training

== Notable alumni and former members of staff ==
- Lindsay Tuckett (1936), cricket Springbok (1947 to 1949)
- Phillip Tobias (1943), professor emeritus, University of the Witwatersrand, Johannesburg, world-renowned paleo-anthropologist. He is best known for his pioneering work at South Africa's famous hominid fossil sites, and is one of the world's leading authorities on the evolution of humankind.
- Peter Carlstein (1956), cricket Springbok (1958 to 1964)
- Frederick Brownell (1957), the designer of the South African and Namibian flags.
- Chris Warner, cricketer and field hockey player
- Glenn Agliotti (1974), controversial businessman and convicted drug dealer, suspected of orchestrating Brett Kebble's death.
- Brett Kebble (1981), mining magnate who was shot dead in 2005.
- Christopher Froome, multiple Tour de France winner
- George Du Rand (2000), Olympic swimmer who represented South Africa at the 2008 Beijing Olympics. Du Rand is still the South African and African record holder in the 200m backstroke.
- Joe Root (2009), cricketer, current England test cricket captain. He represented the St Andrew's 1st XI in 2009 as a part of the School's exchange program with Yorkshire County Cricket Club.
- Gerald Coetzee (2018), cricketer who played in two U19 World Cups, also being named in the "team of the tournament" in 2018. Current teams: Knights, Rajasthan Royals, and he has also represented Jozi Stars.
