= Oli Kebble =

Scottish rugby union player (born 1992)

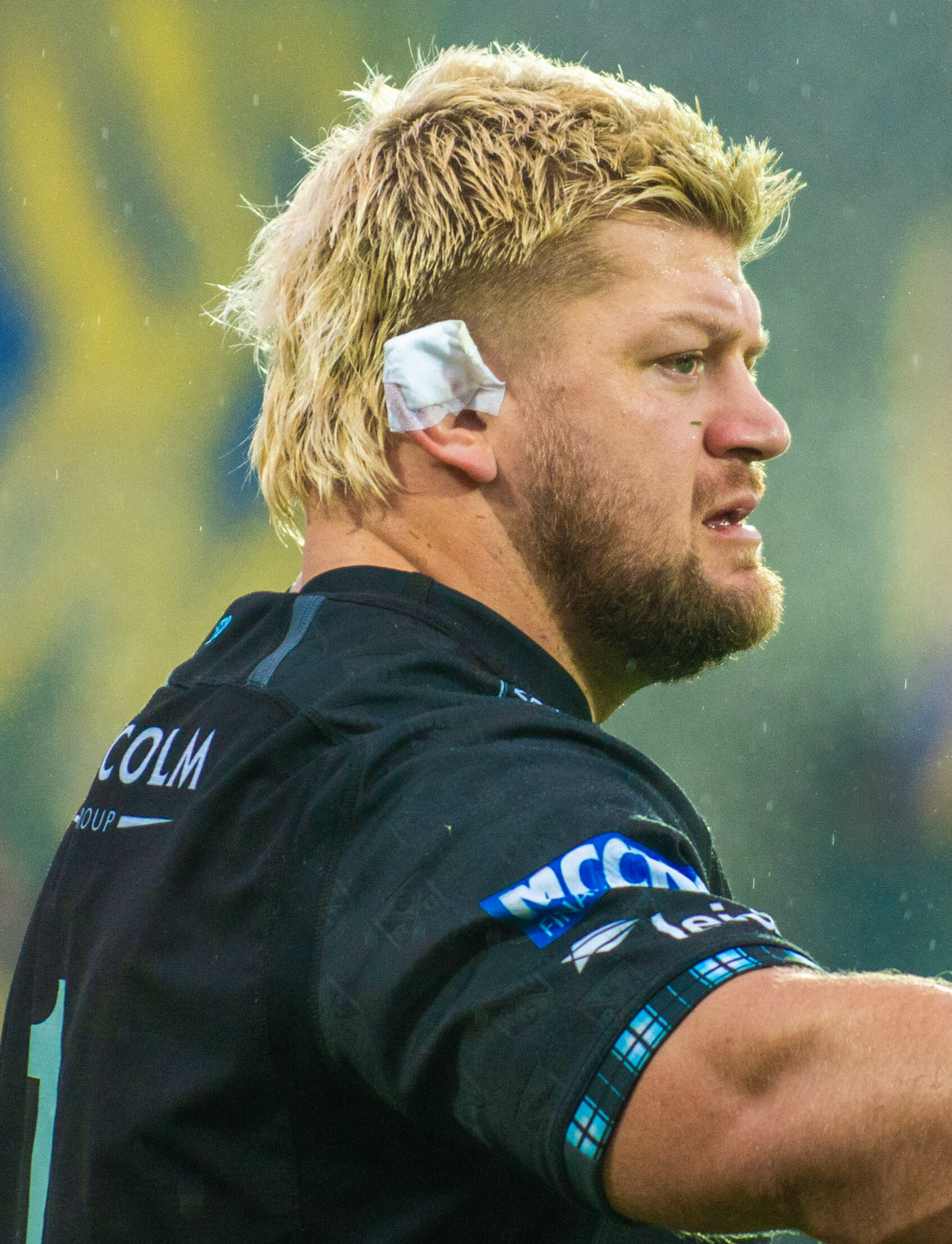
- Full name: Oliver Ralph Kebble
- Born: 18 June 1992 (age 34) Durban, South Africa
- Height: 1.91 m (6 ft 3 in)
- Weight: 145 kg (22 st 12 lb; 320 lb)
- School: Bishops Diocesan College, Cape Town; Dulwich College, London
- University: University of Cape Town
- Notable relative(s): Guy Kebble (father), Brett Kebble (uncle)

Rugby union career
- Position: Prop
- Current team: Stormers
Youth career
- 2010–2011: London Irish
- 2011–2012: Mont-de-Marsan
- 2012–2013: Western Province U21
Amateur team(s)
Years	Team	Apps	(Points)
2013	Ikey Tigers	6	(0)
2017–2018	Marr		
2018–2019	Currie		
Senior career
Years	Team	Apps	(Points)
2012–2017	Western Province	19	(0)
2014–2017	Stormers	47	(5)
2017–2024	Glasgow Warriors	105	(30)
2024–2025	Oyonnax	8	(0)
2025-	Stormers	1	(0)
- Correct as of 27 October 2024
International career
Years	Team	Apps	(Points)
2012	South Africa U20	4	(0)
2020–2022	Scotland	12	(5)
- Correct as of 18 November 2021

Oliver Ralph Kebble (born 18 June 1992 in Durban) is a Scotland international rugby union player, currently playing for Stormers. He previously played for Glasgow Warriors, as well as in Super Rugby with the Stormers and Currie Cup rugby with Western Province in South Africa. His regular position is prop.

== Rugby Union career ==
=== Amateur career ===
Kebble was drafted to Marr in the Scottish Premiership for the 2017–18 season.

Kebble has been drafted to Currie in the Scottish Premiership for the 2018–19 season.

=== Professional career ===
Kebble was part of the London Irish academy, before joining French Pro D2 side Mont-de-Marsan.

In 2012, Kebble returned to South Africa and joined Western Province. He played for the Western Province U21 side in 2012, as well as in 2013, when Western Province won the Under-21 Provincial Championship competition in the latter season.

Kebble made his debut for the Western Province senior team during the 2012 Vodacom Cup competition, coming on as a substitute against the SWD Eagles at Outeniqua Park.

In 2014, Kebble was named in the Stormers pre-season training squad and was later included in the final squad.

On 15 February 2017, Kebble went to Scotland to sign for Glasgow Warriors in the Pro14 beginning in the 2017–18 season.

He left Glasgow Warriors at the conclusion of the 2023–24 season to join French side Oyonnax.

=== International career ===
In 2012, Kebble was part of the South Africa Under-20 side that won the 2012 IRB Junior World Championship held in South Africa. He made a substitute appearances in their opening match against Ireland and started the other pool matches against Italy and England. He also came on as a substitute in the semi-final against Argentina, but was an unused substitute in the final against New Zealand.

Kebble made his international debut for Scotland against Georgia on 23 October 2020.

== Personal life ==
Kebble did his A-levels at Dulwich College in London, England. He is the son of Guy Kebble, a rugby union prop who played in four test matches for the Springboks during the 1993 South Africa rugby union tour of Argentina and the 1994 South Africa rugby union tour of New Zealand. He is the nephew of controversial late mining magnate Brett Kebble.

Whilst at the Stormers academy, Kebble shared a flat with Huw Jones, his former teammate at Glasgow Warriors. To supplement their income Kebble worked managing an office of a security firm and Jones worked in a bar.
