= Guy Kebble =

South African rugby union player (born 1966)

- Born: Guy Ralph Kebble; 2 May 1966 (age 60) Springs, Gauteng
- Height: 1.85 m (6 ft 1 in)
- Weight: 130 kg (287 lb)
- School: Bishops, Cape Town
- University: Stellenbosch University
- Notable relative(s): Roger Kebble (father); Brett Kebble (brother); Oli Kebble (son)

Rugby union career
Provincial / State sides
Years	Team	Apps	(Points)
1988–1989	Western Province	18	
1990–1995	Natal	67	
International career
Years	Team	Apps	(Points)
1993–1994	South Africa	4	(0)

Guy Ralph Kebble (born 2 May 1966) is a former South African rugby union player.

== Playing career ==
Kebble went to school at Bishops in Cape Town and represented Western Province schools at the annual Craven Week tournament in 1983. After finishing school, he studied accounting at Stellenbosch University and made his provincial debut for Western Province in 1988. In 1990 he moved to Natal and played 67 matches for the union between 1990 and 1995.

Kebble made his test match debut for the Springboks against the Argentina on 6 November 1993 at the Ferro Carril Oeste Stadium in Buenos Aires. In 1994 he toured with the Springboks to New Zealand and played in two test matches. He also played in eight tour matches, scoring one try for the Springboks.

=== Test history ===
No.	Opponents	Results (SA 1st)	Position	Tries	Dates	Venue
1.	Argentina	29–26	Loosehead prop		6 Nov 1993	Ferro Carril Oeste Stadium, Buenos Aires
2.	Argentina	52–23	Loosehead prop		13 Nov 1993	Ferro Carril Oeste Stadium, Buenos Aires
3.	New Zealand	14–22	Replacement		9 Jul 1994	Carisbrook, Dunedin
4.	New Zealand	9–13	Loosehead prop		23 Jul 1994	Athletic Park, Wellington

== See also ==
- List of South Africa national rugby union players – Springbok no. 599
