= National Horseracing Authority =

South African regulator

National Horseracing Authority of Southern Africa (NHA)
- Predecessor: The Jockey Club of Southern Africa
- Type: Horseracing Regulatory Body
- Purpose: Horse racing
- Headquarters: Turf Club Street, Turffontein 2190
- Region served: South Africa
- Chairperson: N. Nallah
- Chief Executive: Vee Moodley
- Affiliations: International Federation of Horseracing Authorities
- Website: www.nhra.co.za
- Formerly called: Jockey Club of Southern Africa

The National Horseracing Authority of Southern Africa, known as the National Horseracing Authority for short (NHA or NHRA), formerly the Jockey Club of Southern Africa is the Southern African equivalent of the American and British Jockey Clubs, whose main purposes are to prevent malpractice in horse racing and to regulate the thoroughbred horse racing industry in Southern Africa.

== History ==
The organisation was formed as the Jockey Club of Southern Africa in 1882, when a group of 10 influential figures from South African horse racing met in the Phoenix Hotel in Port Elizabeth to form an organisation to regulate the sport and disputed that arose. The organisation became known as The Jockey Club, named after its counterpart in the United Kingdom that had been established some 100 years earlier. The name "The Jockey Club" did not refer to the current sense of jockeys; in the 18th century, "jockey" referred to anybody who managed or dealt with horses.

The organisation changed its name to the National Horseracing Authority on 19 January 2004.

Horse racing activities are controlled on a regional level as well as a national level. South Africa is divided into four racing districts, with Zimbabwe as the fifth. The organisation has 670 members who elect the 11 Head Executive Stewards who govern the Jockey Club structure.

== Governance ==
The National Horseracing Authority of Southern Africa is governed by a board, as of May 2022 headed by chair N. Nallah. The CEO is Vee Moodley. It refers to itself as the National Horseracing Authority on its website, and is variously abbreviated as NHA or NHRA.

== Mission and objectives ==
The organisation's stated mission is "to regulate, govern, serve and promote the sport of horseracing in Southern Africa".

Its objectives, according to its constitution, are:

- to promote and maintain honourable practice and to eliminate malpractice which may arise in thoroughbred horse racing in SOUTHERN AFRICA
- to regulate the sport of thoroughbred horse racing in SOUTHERN AFRICA
- to maintain and publish the General Stud Book
- to foster, through its regulatory function, the promotion of thoroughbred horse racing in SOUTHERN AFRICA
- to encourage and improve, through its regulatory function, the breed of the thoroughbred race horse in SOUTHERN AFRICA
- to promote and foster co-operation and goodwill with recognised thoroughbred racing authorities, Governments and Provincial Governments
- to render services of whatever nature to racing or other sporting authorities whether within SOUTHERN AFRICA or elsewhere and *to render services to persons or bodies serving, associated or connected to such authorities.

== Functions ==
=== Rules and inquiries ===
The NHA enforces the rules of horse racing, designed to deal with all aspects of racing from the care of horses to serious malpractices like doping of horses. Many of the rules are unchanged since 1882 along with the mindset of those that run the circus. In order to enforce these rules, the NHA employs a number of Stipendiary Stewards ("Stipes"), who are present at every race meeting and use video equipment to help detect any incident that might need investigating.

Inquiries are opened into any matter which appears to be suspicious, and if anybody is found guilty of breaking the rules, the Stipes have the authority to impose penalties ranging from a reprimand to a total ban from racing. Those found guilty can appeal to the Appeal Board, an independent body, if they disagree with the decision.

The NHA operates its own laboratory to test specimens from horses in every race to detect the use of drugs.

=== Licensing ===
Another part of the NHA's role is the licensing of jockeys, trainers and race meeting officials, and the granting of colours to anybody who qualifies to own and race horses.

=== Breeding ===
The NHA also monitors the horse breeding industry. Before any thoroughbred foal can be recorded in the General Stud Book, the mare owner, stallion owner, mare and stallion must have been registered before the foal was born. The breeder must also provide detailed information relating to the time the mare was covered, the time the foal was born and the identity of the foal. A laboratory in Onderstepoort blood types every foal and confirms its parentage, to ensure that horses are pedigree as claimed.

== Jockey Academy ==
The NHA recruits and trains apprentice jockeys. The original Jockey Academy, founded in 1958, operated from a house on the Berea, a suburb of Durban. In 1972, the S.A. Jockeys Academy, designed by the rugby player Tommy Bedford, opened on 8.1 hectares (20 acres) of land adjacent to Summerveld, built to accommodate 40 apprentices. The number of apprentices at any one time is determined by the needs of the racing industry.

During five years as an apprentice, trainees are given a comprehensive education and taught the necessary skills to become a competent rider. Graduates of the academy include Michael Roberts, Jeffrey Lloyd, Felix Coetzee, Robbie Sham and Bartie Liesher.

== Racetracks ==
Racetracks governed by the NHA include:

- Durbanville Racecourse (Cape Town)
- Fairview Racecourse (Port Elizabeth)
- Greyville Racecourse (Durban)
- Kenilworth Racecourse (Cape Town)
- Scottsville Racecourse (Pietermaritzburg)
- Turffontein Racecourse (Johannesburg)
- Vaal Racecourse (Sasolburg)
- (Zimbabwe) Borrowdale Park (Harare)

== See also ==
- Sport in South Africa
