= Brett Kebble =

South African businessman (1964–2005)

- Born: 19 February 1964; Springs, Gauteng
- Died: 27 September 2005 (aged 41); Johannesburg
- Education: University of Cape Town
- Occupation: Businessman
- Spouse: Ingrid Kebble (m. 1990)
- Children: 4
- Father: Roger Kebble
- Relatives: Guy Kebble (brother); Oli Kebble (nephew)

Roger Brett Kebble (19 February 1964 – 27 September 2005) was a South African mining magnate with close links to factions in the ruling political party, the African National Congress. Known to be personally eccentric, he became a major player in South African gold and diamond mining from the mid-1990s, especially through black economic empowerment deals, but was embroiled in allegations of corporate fraud and misconduct, the extent of which was revealed only after his death. He was shot dead on 27 September 2005 in Johannesburg. The investigation into his death, involving several prominent businessmen and politicians, received significant public attention. His name was also prominent in media coverage of Jackie Selebi's 2009 corruption trial. 2010 court testimony revealed that Kebble was killed by hit men hired by his security chief, allegedly at his own request – an apparent suicide-by-murder. However, the complete circumstances surrounding his death remain unclear.

== Life and career ==
Kebble was born in the mining town of Springs, on the East Rand. He matriculated from St. Andrew's School, Bloemfontein, and earned a law degree from the University of Cape Town in 1986. He was an articled clerk at Mallinicks thereafter. He entered mining in 1991, when he and his father Roger Kebble, a former mining engineer, acquired a controlling stake in Rand Leases Gold Mining and later acquired leadership of Randgold & Exploration through a hostile takeover. In partnership with Mzi Khumalo as part of a black economic empowerment deal, Kebble bought a controlling stake in JCI in 1995, though his and Khumalo's relationship later soured. At one point or another, he had a substantial interest in several other mid-size mining companies, including Randex, Randgold Resources, Consolidated African Mines, Harmony, Western Areas, and Durban Deep; and he was involved in numerous black economic empowerment deals.

Under his leadership, and to finance its R4-billion acquisition of the South Deep gold mine, Western Areas sold a half-interest in South Deep to a rival firm and hedged production forward at a low price, to disastrous consequences when the gold price increased. Subsequently, Kebble's reputation declined. On 30 August 2005, he was deposed from the companies he controlled – Western Areas, JCI, and Randgold & Exploration – as a condition of loans to keep the companies afloat, and amid concerns about financial irregularities and corporate governance lapses. At that point, 14.4 million shares in Randgold Resources were missing – Kebble claimed that they had been loaned out – and Randgold & Exploration had been suspended from the Johannesburg Stock Exchange and delisted from Nasdaq for failing to publish its 2004 financial results. The South African National Prosecuting Authority later said that, at the time of his death, Kebble had been facing prosecution for fraud and contravention of the Stock Exchanges Control Act.

=== Ties to the ANC ===
Kebble was reported to be a member of the African National Congress (ANC), and was certainly one of its major financiers, especially in the Western Cape. He was reportedly allied with the ANC Youth League and with Jacob Zuma, who, during the early 2000s, led an internal faction of the ANC which opposed President Thabo Mbeki. After his death, party members honoured him in the media and at his funeral, and Essop Pahad gave the eulogy.

== Death ==
He was shot dead near a bridge over the M1 in Abbotsford, Johannesburg at around 9 p.m. on 27 September 2005, aged 41, while driving to a dinner engagement with his business associate, Sello Rasethaba. He was shot several times while in the driver's seat of his Mercedes. Forensic scientist Dr David Klatzow's investigation was the first to suggest that Kebble had been shot by people known to him with a pistol using 'low-velocity' ammunition used by bodyguards and security operatives. The purpose of such bullets, which require a specially adapted pistol, was to hit assassins and terrorists without passing through their bodies and hitting bystanders or hostages. Despite the closer range, the gunpowder burns in general were not severe, providing further evidence that the ammunition was of a special "reduced charge". Klatzow was also first to suggest that Kebble had committed assisted suicide.

=== Trial of Glen Agliotti ===
On 16 November 2006, businessman Glenn Agliotti was arrested in connection with Kebble's murder. Agliotti, a convicted drug-dealer, was a personal friend of Jackie Selebi, the National Commissioner of the South African Police Service. Agliotti admitted, and Selebi confirmed, that he had called Selebi shortly after Kebble's death, from near the scene of the murder. Although Kebble's family denied that he would have committed suicide, Agliotti claimed that his death had been an "assisted suicide." In its indictment of Kebble on 27 October 2008, the National Prosecuting Authority gave credence to this claim: it recognised that Kebble had orchestrated his own murder, and sought to prosecute Agliotti for his involvement in the plot. In 2009, while Agliotti was awaiting trial, Selebi was prosecuted for corruption, accused of accepting bribes and gifts from Kebble, Agliotti, and businessman Billy Rautenbach in exchange for information and preferential police treatment. During that trial, Agliotti testified that Kebble's security chief, Clinton Nassif, had, at Kebble's request, hired three hit men – Mikey Schultz, Nigel McGurk, and Faizel Smith – to shoot and kill him.

Agliotti was ultimately charged with Kebble's murder; conspiracy to murder Kebble; the attempted murder of Stephen Mildenhall, an Allan Gray fund manager; and conspiracy to murder three other executives, Danie Nortier, Mark Bristow, and Mark Wellesley-Wood. When his trial began in the South Gauteng High Court, following several delays, in July 2010, Agliotti pleaded not guilty to all charges. Early in the trial, one of the hit men, Mikey Schultz, confirmed Kebble's claim that he, McGurk, and Smith had been hired by Nassif – at a fee of R2 million – to assist Kebble in his own suicide. Schultz said that he had himself pulled the trigger and had shot Kebble five times.

Schultz also testified that all of his instructions had come from Nassif, and thus admitted that he could not directly implicate Agliotti in the planning or execution of Kebble's death. In November 2010, Agliotti was acquitted when the court ruled that the state had not made a prima facie case against him. The Scorpions, the elite unit of the National Prosecuting Authority which pursued Agliotti's prosecution before it was disbanded, was criticised for having indemnified Nassif, Schultz, and others implicated in the murder. Some called it a "botched prosecution."

== Alleged criminal activities ==
During the Selebi trial, it emerged that Agliotti had acted as middleman between Selebi and Kebble at a fee of $1 million, paid from the JCI books. Kebble employees had offered holidays to Selebi's family and, through Selebi, had provided equipment to the police, and Selebi had attended dinners at the Kebbles' Johannesburg home and intervened in matters on their behalf. The Scorpions also investigated accusations that Kebble made millions of rands in disguised payments to the ANC and its affiliates.

During the Agliotti trial, Schultz testified that Kebble, through John Stratton, ordered the murder of several people, including Martin Welz, the editor of Noseweek. Smith, another of the hit men hired by Nassif, said that he had paid two men to shoot an Allan Gray fund manager, Stephen Mildenhall, in August 2005, shortly after Kebble had been required to resign from his companies as a condition for a R500 million loan from Allan Gray.

=== Randgold Resources fraud ===
After Kebble's death, his companies submitted to forensic investigations. It transpired that Kebble and other directors at JCI appropriated and sold 21.8 million shares of Randgold Resources – worth some R2 billion – held by Randgold & Exploration. Some of the proceeds were channeled into Western Areas, the other mining company controlled by Kebble. Legal action has since been ongoing to resolve the issue of the missing Randgold Resources shares. On 21 January 2010, a revised settlement agreement was signed between the JCI Group and the Randgold & Exploration Group. In 2019, Randgold & Exploration claimed it was owed R2.7 billion by Kebble's estate.

== Sale of art collection ==
His art collection went under the hammer on 6 May 2009. Bidders from as far as Australia, New Zealand and Pennsylvania were at the auction. One hundred and thirty-three pieces of art were sold for ZAR53.90 million. This falls short of the one billion rand that he was said to have squandered.

== The Brett Kebble Art Awards ==
Kebble was the controversial patron of the Brett Kebble Art Awards (BKAA), which he established in 2003 to provide a showcase for established artists, and to help those less known to attain recognition. It was also meant to build a non-racial bridge into the 21st century.

"The Kebble" as it became known, was the most inclusive award of its kind (often criticized for including a "craft" category to be judged on par with the other mediums like painting, sculpture, printmaking and photography) in South Africa. Adding to this, it was also the richest, having a total purse of R620 000 (roughly $98 000) with a grand prize of R200 000 (roughly $32 000).

After Kebble's murder, his family decided to cancel the 2006 awards.

In February 2006, artist Deborah Weber opened a solo exhibition in Johannesburg, Art Media Media Art, on the same day that the BKAA had been planned to open at the Cape Town International Convention Centre. She explored the time trajectory from being selected as an artist for the 2004 Kebble Art Awards, to working on the awards in 2005, and ending with Brett Kebble's death in September 2005.
