= Drdgold =

South African gold producer

DRDGOLD Limited
- Formerly: Durban Roodepoort Deep Limited
- Type: Public
- Traded as: NYSE: DRD (ADR)
- Industry: mining and minerals, gold mining
- Founded: 1895
- Headquarters: Weltevredenpark, Roodepoort, South Africa
- Key people: Timothy Cumming, Chairman; Niël Pretorius, CEO; Riaan Davel, CFO
- Products: gold, silver
- Website: www.drdgold.com//

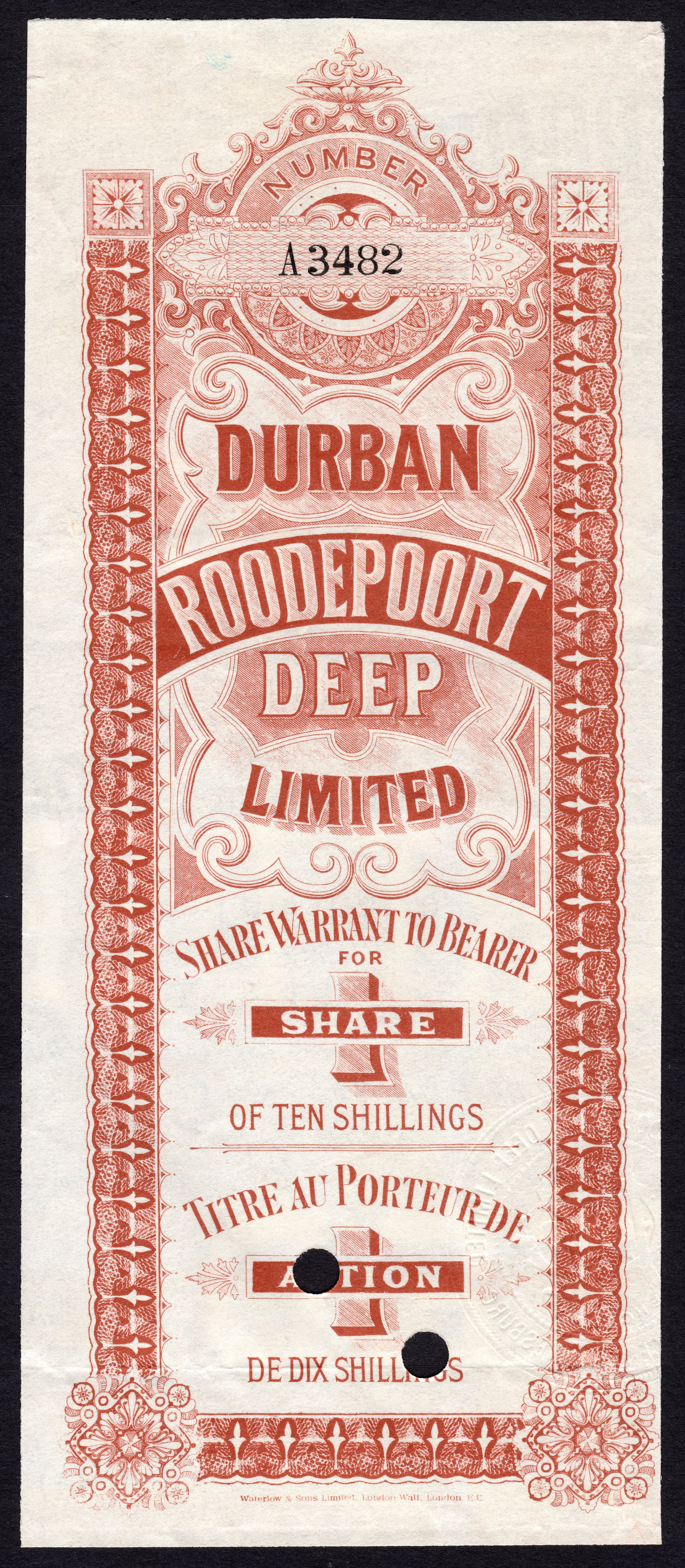
Share warrant for Durban Roodepoort Deep Limited. c. 1890s.

Drdgold Limited (formerly Durban Roodepoort Deep Limited) is a South African gold producer and a specialist in the recovery of the metal from the retreatment of surface tailings. The company is listed on the New York and Johannesburg stock exchanges.
