= Ian Hannam =

British investment banker

- Born: Ian Charles Hannam; March 1956 (age 70); South London
- Education: Imperial College London; London Business School
- Occupation: Banker
- Title: Chairman, Hannam & Partners

Ian Charles Hannam (born March 1956) is a British investment banker, and founder of Hannam & Partners. He was previously Vice-Chairman of JPMorgan, where he became known as the "King of Mining". Hannam has been a principal investor in each of his banking endeavours and of late has been increasingly active as a principal investor outside of banking with a series of investments in the resource and fintech spaces. He remains one of the world's leading brokers of capital investments.

== Early life ==
Hannam was born in March 1956. He was born in South London and grew up in Bermondsey, the son of a local government worker. He went to grammar school.

He served in the 21 SAS (Artists Regiment), becoming a Sergeant in 1979 before entering Royal Military Academy Sandhurst in 1982 and becoming a Captain.

Hannam has a bachelor's degree in engineering from Imperial College London, and worked for the construction company Taylor Woodrow in Nigeria and Oman. He then studied at the London Business School, and moved to the US, and worked for Salomon Brothers and later JP Morgan.

== Career ==
=== Salomon Brothers ===
In 1984, Ian Hannam joined Salomon Brothers. While at Salomon Brothers, Hannam managed or co-managed all British government privatisations, including BT and British Airways. He also completed the first block trade in the London market, selling BP. He also completed the first placing in the London market via book building.

=== Robert Fleming ===
In 1992, Hannam left Salomon Brothers to join Robert Fleming, where he executed the sell down of the Wellcome Trust's holding in Wellcome plc. At the time, it ranked as the world's largest equity deal.

Hannam managed many of the company's deals in Asia, South Africa and the UK. He acted for the Hong Kong Government during the Asian crisis of 1998 in its divestiture of its equity portfolio. He was also the key relationship banker to SABMiller, and was instrumental in obtaining its London listing.

In 2000, Robert Fleming was acquired by Chase Manhattan for $7.5 billion. Hannam was the largest private shareholder outside of the Fleming family.

=== JPMorgan ===
In 2005, Hannam was responsible for leading JPMorgan five-year joint venture with Cazenove, leading to the creation of JPMorgan Cazenove. Until 2015, Hannam was a member of JPMorgan’s Global Equities Management Committee. He stepped down in 2012 to fight allegations of market abuse, for which he was ultimately fined, despite his attempt at appeal.

In July 2014, Hannam was fined £450,000 for market abuse by the UK's Financial Conduct Authority (FCA), "one of the largest handed down to an individual and was considered a major coup for the authority". The fine was in connection with "wrongly disclosing confidential information to Iraqi Kurdistan's oil minister, relating to client oil firm Heritage in 2008", when Hannam was working for JP Morgan. In April 2012, Hannam stood down as JP Morgan's global chairman of equity capital markets, in order to deal with the allegations.

=== Hannam & Partners ===
In 2012, he bought Strand Partners and renamed it Hannam & Partners. Hannam continues to serve as chairman of the corporate finance boutique where the CEO is former JPMorgan colleague Neil Passmore.

=== Pyser ===
In 2020, it was reported that Hannam had acquired British manufacturer Pyser. Operating from the Honourable Artillery Company in the City of London, the company conducted COVID-19 antibody tests through its Pyser Testing subsidiary. It was also reported that Hannam had acquired the equipment from a mask manufacturing facility in China to start manufacturing personal protective equipment in Shipston-on-Stour.

== Personal life ==
Hannam is a former captain in the Territorial Army, in which he served 20 years.
