= Durban July Handicap =

- Class: Group I
- Location: Greyville Racecourse; Durban, KwaZulu-Natal (South Africa)
- Inaugurated: 1897
- Race type: Thoroughbred - flat racing
- Sponsor: Hollywoodbets
- Website: Durban July history

Race information
- Distance: 2200 meters (10.94 furlongs)
- Surface: Turf
- Track: Right-handed
- Qualification: Three-year-olds & up
- Weight: Handicap
- Purse: R10 million (2026)

The Hollywoodbets Durban July Handicap is a South African Thoroughbred horse race held annually on the first Saturday of July since 1897 at Greyville Racecourse in Durban, KwaZulu-Natal. Raced on turf, the Durban July Handicap is open to horses of all ages. It is South Africa's premier horse racing event and currently offers a purse of R10 million.

First held in July 1897 at a distance of 1 mile (approx 1600m), the distance was modified several times until 1970 when it was changed to its current 2200 meters (11 furlongs).

The 129th edition was held on 5 July 2025. The winner was The Real Prince, who was ridden by Craig Zackey and trained by Dean Kannemeyer. The horse was owned and bred by Khaya Stables (Pty) Ltd.

== Field for 2026 ==
Below is the final field for the 2026 Hollywoodbets Durban July to be run at Hollywoodbets Greyville racecourse on 4 July 2026, Race 7, 16h00. Should a horse be scratched early, the reserve runner would take up the barrier position of the scratched horse.

No	Dr	Horse	Wgt	MR	Eq	Jock	Trainer
1	1	Isivivane	52	108	A	Sean Veale	Peter Muscutt
2	2	Regulation	52	106	A	Zac Lloyd	Justin Snaith
3	3	The Ultimate King	56.5	117	BA	Kabelo Matsunyane	Tony Peter
4	4	Star Major	57	122	A	#Mickaelle Michel	James Crawford
5	5	Legal Counsel	62	128	A	Callan Murray	Justin Snaith
6	6	Hazy Dazy	54.5	117	HA	*Trent Mayhew	Corne Spies
7	7	Wish List	54.5	117	A	Andrew Fortune	Justin Snaith
8	8	Gladatorian	61.5	127	T A	Muzi Yeni	Stuart Ferrie
9	9	Viva's Liberte	53	114	A	Craig Zackey	Candice Bass
10	10	Native Ruler	58.5	121	A	Keagan de Melo	Justin Snaith
11	11	Note To Self	55	118	A	Richard Fourie	Justin Snaith
12	12	Zeitz	53	110	BA	Serino Moodley	Andre Nel
13	13	Mocha Blend	56.5	117	A	Tristan Godden	Frank Robinson
14	14	I Salute You	54.5	113	BA	Mark Du Plessis	Peter Muscutt
15	15	Olivia's Way	55	114	CA	Juan Paul v'd Merwe	Roy Magner
16	16	Minogue	56	116	A	Gavin Lerena	Candice / Tammy Dawson
17	17	King Pelles	59	122	BA	Chad Schofield	Gareth van Zyl
18	18	Aladdin's Lamp	53	110	BA	Calvin Habib	Mike / Mathew de Kock
19	RR	Choisaanada	58.5	121	A	Reserve 1	Erico Verdonese
20	RR	Curious Girl	52	100	A	Reserve 2	Mike / Mathew de Kock

  - Indicates apprentice jockey
- #Indicates female jockey

== Records ==
Only five horses have ever won the Durban July Handicap back-to-back.

- Campanajo (1897, 1898)
- Corriecrian (1907, 1908)
- Milesia Pride (1949, 1950)
- El Picha (1999, 2000)
- Do It Again (2018, 2019)

A horse named Pamphlet won twice in 1918 and 1920.

Do It Again holds the record for the most appearances in the Hollywoodbets Durban July, with 6 runs (from 2018 to 2023). He is also the most decorated horse in the race, having won the race on two occasions, and never finishing out of the places.

- Gondolier: Ran 5 races, finally winning the race in 1985
- Beau Art: Ran 5 races and placed first in 1980
- Flaming Rock won his first Durban July in 1991 and then ran in the race 3 times more before retiring.

Most wins by a trainer:

- Sydney C. Laird - 7 (1961, 1963, 1966, 1967, 1971, 1973, 1978)
- Terrance Millard - 6 (1983, 1984, 1986, 1988, 1989, 1990)
- Justin Snaith - 6 (2008, 2014, 2018, 2019, 2020, 2026)
- Mike de Kock - 5 (2001, 2004, 2010, 2011, 2022)
- Dean Kannemeyer - 4 (2003, 2006, 2015, 2025)
- F. Murray - 4 (1910, 1911, 1912, 1913)

Trainer F. Murray won the race four years in a row from 1910 through 1913.

Most wins by a jockey:

- 5: Anton Marcus (1993, 2000, 2005, 2007, 2018)
- 4: Harold "Tiger" Wright (1942, 1947, 1949, 1955), Anthony Delpech (1998, 2004, 2010, 2011) Piere Strydom (2016, 2012, 2001, 1996), Richard Fourie (2014, 2019, 2020, 2026)
- 3: Bertie Hayden (1971, 1973, 1978), Felix Coetzee (1984, 1988, 1990).

Of note to North American racing fans, the 1963 race was won by Colorado King, who subsequently raced in California and won the 1964 Hollywood Gold Cup, plus set a world record for nine furlongs in winning the American Handicap at Hollywood Park Racetrack. As well, the 2002 winner, Ipi Tombe, became the first horse bred in Zimbabwe to ever win a race at historic Churchill Downs in Louisville, Kentucky.

In 2013, S'manga Khumalo became the first black African jockey to win the Vodacom Durban July when riding Heavy Metal to victory for trainer Sean Tarry.

In 2017, Candice Bass-Robinson became the first female trainer to win the Vodacom Durban July following the victory of Marinaresco. In 2021, Michelle Rix, along with her father Harold Crawford, became the second female trainer with the victory by Kommetdieding.

In 2021, Ashwin Reynolds became the first owner of colour to own a Vodacom Durban July winner following the victory of Kommetdieding.

== Winners of the Durban July Handicap since 1978 ==
Year	Winner	Age	Jockey	Trainer
2026	Note To Self	3	Richard Fourie	Justin Snaith
2025	The Real Prince	4	Craig Zackey	Dean Kannemeyer
2024	Oriental Charm	3	JP van der Merwe	Brett Crawford
2023	Winchester Mansion	4	Kabelo Matsunyane	Brett Crawford
2022	Sparkling Water	4	S'manga Khumalo	Mike de Kock
2021	Kommetdieding	3	Gavin Lerena	Harold Crawford & Michelle Rix
2020	Belgarion	4	Richard Fourie	Justin Snaith
2019	Do It Again	4	Richard Fourie	Justin Snaith
2018	Do It Again	3	Anton Marcus	Justin Snaith
2017	Marinaresco	4	Bernard Fayd'Herbe	Candice Bass-Robinson
2016	The Conglomerate	4	Piere Strydom	Joey Ramsden
2015	Power King	4	Stuart Randolph	Dean Kannemayer
2014	Legislate	3	Richard Fourie	Justin Snaith
2013	Heavy Metal	5	S’manga Khumalo	S G Tarry
2012	Pomodoro	3	Piere Strydom	S G Tarry
2011	Igugu	3	Anthony Delpech	Mike de Kock
2010	Bold Silvano	3	Anthony Delpech	Mike de Kock
2009	Big City Life	3	G. Cheyne	Glen Kotzen
2008	Pocket Power/Dancer's Daughter	5/4	Bernard Fayd'herbe/Kevin Shea	Mike W. Bass/Justin Snaith
2007	Hunting Tower	5	Anton Marcus	Charles S. Laird
2006	Eyeofthetiger	4	Gerrit Schlechter	Dean Kannermeyer
2005	Dunford	5	Anton Marcus	Mike W. Bass
2004	Greys Inn	4	Anthony Delpech	Mike de Kock
2003	Dynasty	4	Robbie Fradd	Dean Kannemeyer
2002	Ipi Tombe	4	Kevin Shea	Mike de Kock
2001	Trademark	5	Piere Strydom	Mike W. Bass
2000	El Picha	6	Anton Marcus	Geoff V. Woodruff
1999	El Picha	5	Robbie Hill	Geoff V. Woodruff
1998	Classic Flag	4	Anthony Delpech	David Ferraris
1997	Super Quality	5	Michael Roberts	David Ferraris
1996	London News	4	Piere Strydom	Alec G. Laird
1995	Teal	4	Johnny Geroudis	Patrick B. Shaw
1994	Space Walk	6	Robbie Fradd	M. H. "Ricky" Maingard
1993	Dancing Duel	4	Anton Marcus	Anthony T. Millard
1992	Spanish Galliard	8	Robbie Sham	Dennis R. Drier
1991	Flaming Rock	4	Karl Neisius	R. Chris Snaith
1990	Ilustrador	4	Felix Coetzee	Terrance Millard
1989	Right Prerogative	4	M. A. Sutherland	Terrance Millard
1988	Royal Chalice	4	Felix Coetzee	Terrance Millard
1987	Bush Telegraph	4	Garth Puller	Bert Abercrombie
1986	Occult	5	Bartie Leisher	Terrance Millard
1985	Gondolier	6	W. Harvey	M. P. Antelme
1984	Devon Air	5	Felix Coetzee	Terrance Millard
1983	Tecla Bluff	5	M. A. Sutherland	Terrance Millard
1982	Jamaican Rumba	5	Patrick Wynne	G. Thompson
1981	Big Charles	5	J. Anderson	Dr. L. F. Naude
1980	Beau Art	7	Freddy Macaskill	J. Nicholson
1979	Over The Air	5	Garth Puller	P. G. Kannemeyer
1978	Politician	5	Bertie Hayden	Sydney C. Laird

== Winners from 1897 to 2026 ==
Seq.	Date	Winner	Origin	Age	Sex	Wt. (lb.)	Dist.	Time (sec.)	WFA FMR (lb.)	Breeder	Owner	Trainer	Jockey
130	4 Jul 2026	Note To Self	SAF	3	G	121	2200	133.48		Varsfontein Stud	Messrs J I Bloch & Jonathan Snaith & Nancy Hossack	Justin Snaith	Richard Fourie
129	5 Jul 2025	The Real Prince	SAF	4	G	125	2200	134.22		Khaya Stables Pty Ltd	Khaya Stables Pty Ltd	Dean Kannemeyer	Craig Zackey
128	6 Jul 2024	Oriental Charm	SAF	3	C	116	2200	133.66		Cheveley Stud	Messrs Greg Bortz, Leon Ellman and Ms Gina Goldmsith	Brett Crawford	JP van der Merwe
127	1 Jul 2023	Winchester Mansion	SAF	4	G	116	2200	133.85		Drakenstein Stud (nom: Mrs G A Rupert)	Drakenstein Stud (nom: Mrs G A Rupert)	Brett Crawford	Kabelo Matsunyane
126	2 Jul 2022	Sparkling Water	SAF	4	M	118	2200	135.08	??	Wilgerbosdrift & Mauritzfontein	Wilgerbosdrift Pty Ltd	M de Kock	S Khumalo
125	3 Jul 2021	Kommetdieding	SAF	3	C	117	2200	133.71	??	Klawervlei Stud	A Reynolds	Harold Crawford & Michelle Rix	G Lerena
124	25 Jul 2020	Belgarion	SAF	4	G	117	2200	132.40	??	A N Foster	A N Foster & The Hon Mrs G R Foster	J Snaith	R Fourie
123	6 Jul 2019	Do It Again	SAF	4	G	132	2200	135.04	??	Northfields Stud (Pty) Ltd	Messrs N Jonsson, B Kantor & Late W J C Mitchell	J Snaith	R Fourie
122	7 Jul 2018	Do It Again	SAF	3	G	118.8	2200	135.20	131	Northfields Stud (Pty) Ltd	Messrs N Jonsson, B Kantor & W J C Mitchell	J Snaith	A Marcus
121	1 Jul 2017	Marinaresco	SAF	4	G	132.2	2200	132.51	127	Mauritzfontein (Pty) Ltd (Nom: Miss J B Slack)	M W Bass, F Green, Bryn Ressell & N M Shirtliff	Candice Bass-Robinson	B Fayd'Herbe
120	2 Jul 2016	The Conglomerate	AUS	4	G	122.1	2200	133.50	140	Mr D R Fleming NSW	Mayfair Speculators (Pty) Ltd (Nom: Mr D L Brugman)	J Ramsden	P Strydom
119	4 Jul 2015	Power King	SAF	4	G	116.6	2200	135.17	135	Maine Chance Farms (Pty) Ltd	Khaya Stables (Pty) Ltd	D Kannemeyer	S Randolph
118	5 Jul 2014	Legislate	SAF	3	C	123.2	2200	136.33	140	Cheveley Stud	Messrs W J C Mitchell, Drakenstein Stud & Newbury Racing (Pty) Ltd	J Snaith	R Fourie
117	6 Jul 2013	Heavy Metal	SAF	4	G	130.9	2200	135.44	135	Bosworth Farm Stud	Mr C J H van Niekerk	S Tarry	S Khumalo
116	7 Jul 2012	Pomodoro	SAF	3	C	121	2200	133.19	131	Mr C J H van Niekerk	Mr C J H van Niekerk	S Tarry	P Strydom
115	2 Jul 2011	Igugu	AUS	3	F	121	2200	132.82	131	Kia Ora Stud	Sheikh Mohammed Bin Khalifa Al Maktoum & Mr & Mrs A J Macdonald	M de Kock	A Delpech
114	31 Jul 2010	Bold Silvano	SAF	3	C	122.1	2200	133.03	133	Ascot Stud (Pty) Ltd	Sheikh Mohammed Bin Khalifa Al Maktoum and Mrs G Thompson	M de Kock	A Delpech
113	4 Jul 2009	Big City Life	SAF	3	C	112.2	2200	135.55	128	J A Wintle	Messrs H J Basson, R W Deacon, G A Hauptfleisch, G S Kotzen and G W Mitchell	G Kotzen	G SHayne
112	5 Jul 2008	Pocket Power	SAF	5	G	127.6	2200	132.15	132	Zandvliet Stud	Mr N M Shirtliff & Mr and Mrs A D Webber	M W Bass	B Fayd'Herbe
112	5 Jul 2008	Dancer's Daughter	GB	4	F	116.6	2200	132.15	125	Mrs D O Joly	Mr G J and Mrs R D Beck	J Snaith	K Shea
111	7 Jul 2007	Hunting Tower	SAF	4	G	121	2200	134.6	126	Mrs B D Oppenheimer	Mrs B D Oppenheimer	C S Laird	A Marcus
110	1 Jul 2006	Eyeofthetiger	BRZ	3	C	118.8	2200	132.59	134	Fazenda Mondesir	Fieldspring Racing	D M Kannemeyer	G Schlechter
109	2 Jul 2005	Dunford	SAF	4	C	114.4	2200	135.28	123	C A Mentz	Messrs R J Bloomberg, R W Champion, P G Georgas and G J Wilson	M W Bass	A Marcus
108	3 Jul 2004	Greys Inn	USA	4	C	110	2200	132.65	132	Mrs B D Oppenheimer	Mrs B D Oppenheimer	M de Kock	A Delpech
107	5 Jul 2003	Dynasty	SAF	3	C	116.6	2200	135.2	137	Wilgerbosdrift Stud	Fieldspring Racing	D M Kannemeyer	R Fradd
106	6 Jul 2002	Ipi Tombe	ZIM	3	F	114.4	2200	135.94	129	P J Moor	Messrs D Coleman, H W Leyenaar, S M Tomlinson and Sunmark Racing Syndicate	M de Kock	K Shea
105	7 Jul 2001	Trademark	SAF	4	G	112.2	2200	131.76	124	D Cohen and Sons	Mr M Barfoot, Mrs R C & Mr T J Kerkman	M W Bass	P Strydom
104	1 Jul 2000	El Picha	ARG	5	G	127.6	2200	133.86	139	La Irenita	T M Millard, B B Roux and A Swersky	G Woodruff	A Marcus
103	3 Jul 1999	El Picha	ARG	4	G	116.6	2200	133.08	125	La Irenita	T M Millard, B B Roux and A Swersky	G Woodruff	R Hill
102	4 Jul 1998	Classic Flag	SAF	3	C	116.6	2200	132.09	133	Clifton Stud	Prof and Mrs W Herbst	D E Ferraris	A Delpech
101	5 Jul 1997	Super Quality	SAF	4	G	117.7	2200	136.8	128	D Cohen and Sons	Mr P D F Hinton	D E Ferraris	M Roberts
100	6 Jul 1996	London News	SAF	3	C	114.4	2200	133.5	129	Koster Bros	Mr L & Mrs J Jaffee	A Laird	P Strydom
99	1 Jul 1995	Teal	SAF	3	G	114.4	2200	135.3	131	Somerset Stud	Mr D J Botes	P B Shaw	J Geroudis
98	2 Jul 1994	Space Walk	SAF	5	G	116.6	2200	136.5	122	D Cohen and Sons	Mrs D M McCulloch, Messrs A F C de Chazel, R W Hancock and R V Starkey	M H Maingard	R Fradd
97	3 Jul 1993	Dancing Duel	SAF	3	C	114.4	2200	133.2	128	Mr T L Bailes	Messrs K M Mackenzie, T L Bailes and S McCarthy	A T Millard	A Marcus
96	4 Jul 1992	Spanish Galliard	SAF	5	G	119.9	2200	132.9	128	Estate Late H I Khan	Mr and Mrs H F Oppenheimer and Mr D G Nicholson	D R Drier	R Sham
95	6 Jul 1991	Flaming Rock	IRE	4	C	115.5	2200	134.2	130	Athasi Stud	Mrs SA Pfeiffer	R C Snaith	K Neisius
94	7 Jul 1990	Illustrador	ARG	3	G	113.3	2200	134.3	132	Agencia Tresiete S C A	DI Scott, L Jaffee and T L Bailes	T M Millard	F Coetzee
93	1 Jul 1989	Right Prerogative	SAF	3	C	107.8	2200	138.5	122	Mr and Mrs G J Carey	Mr B G Sylvester and Mrs L Taberer	T M Millard	M Sutherland
92	2 Jul 1988	Royal Chalice	SAF	3	C	111.1	2200	134.6	132	Birch Bros	Mrs H L Bailes	T M Millard	D Coetzee
91	4 Jul 1987	Bush Telegraph	SAF	3	C	107.8	2200	133.5	128	Highlands Farms Stud (Pty) Ltd	Mr and Mrs G J Beck and Mr and Mrs L Jaffee	B Abercrombie	G Puller
90	5 Jul 1986	Occult	SAF	4	C	111.1	2200	133.6	123	Mrs J M Plumbly	B D Miller	T M Millard	B Leisher
89	6 Jul 1985	Gondolier	SAF	5	C	119.9	2200	134.4	127	De Wet Bros and Mrs M de Wet	C J S Taylor and J H Rayner	M P Antelme	W Harvey
88	7 Jul 1984	Devon Air	GB	5	F	115.5	2200	135.4	120	J R Coggan	DI and RM Scott	T M Millard	D Coetzee
87	2 Jul 1983	Tecla Bluff	ARG	4	F	111.1	2200	134.2	119	Mr Rincon del Pino	S A Press	T M Millard	M Sutherland
86	3 Jul 1982	Jamaican Rumba	SAF	4	C	105.6	2200	0	114	R and H Caradoc Davies	H A Mclean Robertson	G M Thompson	P Wynne
85	4 Jul 1981	Big Charles	SAF	4	C	117.7	2200	136.1	123	Mr A Distel	Dr L F Naude	Dr L F Naude	J Anderson
84	5 Jul 1980	Beau Art	SAF	6	C	122.1	2200	135.2	127	Sir Derrick Bailey	Mr D J Davy	J Nicholson	F Macaskill
83	7 Jul 1979	Over the Air	SAF	4	C	117.7	2200	135.9	124	G C Gird	Mrs E & Mr R J Ovenstone	P Kannemeyer	G Puller
82	1 Jul 1978	Politician	SAF	4	C	125.4	2200	136.4	141	Scott Bros	Mr M B Javett & Mrs E Tenderini	S Laird	B Hayden
81	2 Jul 1977	Lightning Shot	SAF	4	C	107.8	2200	139.7	121	Mr and Mrs D G Rich	C H and G Els and J W Sloane	D G Rich	D Mustard
80	3 Jul 1976	Jamaican Music	SAF	5	C	119.9	2200	136.6	131	Noreen Stud	Dr C C Crohin	R J Rixon	B Abercrombie
79	5 Jul 1975	Principal Boy	SAF	5	C	107.8	2200	135.2	125	Mr and Mrs H F Oppenheimer	Mr and Mrs H F Oppenheimer	J Breval	R Thompson
78	6 Jul 1974	Riboville	SAF	4	C	104.5	2200	135.4	119	D W Silcock	Mr & Mrs D H G Mosenthal	G Azzie	M Schoeman
77	7 Jul 1973	Yataghan	SAF	3	C	107.8	2200	136.6	124	Alex Robertson	J M G Schimmel	S Laird	B Hayden
76	1 Jul 1972	In Full Flight	SAF	3	C	115.5	2200	135.2	134	G C Gird	N H Ferguson	D Payne	R Rhodes
75	3 Jul 1971	Mazarin	SAF	3	C	107.8	2200	134	132	R Koster	Mr & Mrs E Tenderini	S Laird	B Hayden
74	4 Jul 1970	Court Day	SAF	4	C	112.2	2200	135.6	127	D B F Geldenhuys	M Livanos	R T Knight	C Maree
73	5 Jul 1969	Naval Escort	SAF	3	C	105	2100	129.8	123	Birch Bros	D and C J Saunders	F Rickaby	A Reid
72	6 Jul 1968	Chimboraa	SAF	5	C	106	2100	129.8	112	Verborgenfontein Stud	Mr and Mrs L Burstein	B A Cherry	D Payne
71	1 Jul 1967	Jollify	SAF	3	C	100	2100	130.4	123	Birch Bros	D and C J Saunders	F Rickaby	J Gorton
71	1 Jul 1967	Sea Cottage	SAF	4	C	127	2100	130.4	144	Birch Bros	S Laird	S Laird	R Sivewright
70	2 Jul 1966	Java Head	SAF	6	G	127	2100	128	137	Mrs G M Olivier and Son	B Levin	S Laird	H Cawcutt
69	3 Jul 1965	King Willow	SAF	3	C	106	2100	130.4	126	H F Oppenheimer	Mr and Mrs H F Oppenheimer	J Breval	I Bailey
68	4 Jul 1964	Numeral	SAF	4	C	108	2100	129.8	119	S O Elley	Mr and Mrs C W Engelhard	G Azzie	R Rhodes
67	6 Jul 1963	Colorado King	SAF	3	C	112	2100	129.2	130	Birch Bros	P S Louw	S Laird	R Sivewright
66	7 Jul 1962	Diza	SAF	4	F	98	2100	130.4	109	Birch Bros	F O Lambert	J H Gorton	A Roberts
65	1 Jul 1961	Kerason	SAF	5	C	105	2100	133.4	113	Alex Robertson	Capt W A K Dalzell	S Laird	G Walker
64	2 Jul 1960	Left Wing	SAF	3	C	101	2100	133.8	121	Birch Bros	S Garrett	S Garrett	P Cayeux
63	4 Jul 1959	Tiger Fish	SAF	4	C	124	2100	128.6	133	H F Oppenheimer	Mr and Mrs H F Oppenheimer	T Forness	B Little
62	5 Jul 1958	Excise	SAF	4	C	112	2100	132	121	D P le Roux	D P le Roux	W Cawcutt	H Cawcutt
61	6 Jul 1957	Migraine	SAF	3	F	101	2100	129.4	117	A L Robertson	Mr and Mrs D Lawrie	F J Chappell	H Passmoore
60	7 Jul 1956	Spey Bridge	SAF	5	C	128	2100	131	133	Mrs I K Lockie	H Amos	H Amos	C Buckham
59	2 Jul 1955	Pretos Crown	SAF	4	C	112	2100	130	119	F Droste	F T Edeling	G Azzie	H Wright
58	3 Jul 1954	C'est Si Bon	SAF	3	C	98	2100	129.2	114	Miss M Z Reynolds and D Labistour	Miss M Z Reynolds and D Labistour	D Labistour	J Byrnes
57	4 Jul 1953	Flash On	SAF	3	C	112	2100	128.4	134	M Ruperti	I Jacobs	W E Huckell	J Westwater
56	5 Jul 1952	Mowgli	SAF	4	C	112	2100	129.8	130	A R Ellis	A R Ellis	G A Ellis	B Lewis
55	7 Jul 1951	Gay Jane	SAF	5	F	99	2100	129.8	105	Miss M Z Reynolds and D Labistour	Miss M Z Reynolds and D Labistour	D Labistour	V McMurtry
54	1 Jul 1950	Milesia Pride	GB	4	C	125	2100	130.4	140	Mr J J Parkinson, IRE	Estate late J T Amery	J Morrison	B LEWIS
53	2 Jul 1949	Milesia Pride	GB	3	C	108	2100	130		Mr J J Parkinson, IRE	J T Amery	J Morrison	H Wright
52	3 Jul 1948	Monasterevan	GB	5	C	119	2100	134		Mr J J Parkinson, IRE	E Pike and A W James	E Shaw	C Buckham
51	5 Jul 1947	Brookhill	GB	4	C	102	2100	130.6		Sir Thomas Dixon	L H Oates	T J H Potgieter	H Wright
50	6 Jul 1946	St Pauls	SAF	5	C	113	2100	130		Birch Bros	P Goss	D Talbert	H Foster
49	7 Jul 1945	St Seiriol	GB	7	C	113	2100	131.2		Lord Deby	H Barnett	C L Longhurst	H Butler
48	1 Jul 1944	Monteith	GB	7	G	130	2100	131		Sir Charles Pulley, IRE	A Wayne	C B Clutterbuck	H Berry
47	3 Jul 1943	Piccadilly Jim	SAF	4	C	122	2100	132		Hon W A Deane	W A Deane	C E Wade	H Feldman
46	4 Jul 1942	Silver Phantom	GB	4	C	108	2100	129.6			A E & F M Orr	E Shaw	H Wright
45	5 Jul 1941	Sadri II	FR	5	C	104	2100	131			S Garrett	S Garrett	S Amos
44	6 Jul 1940	Kipling	FR	4	C	104	2000	125.4			N H Ferguson	A E Cruickshank	A Gorton
43	1 Jul 1939	Silver Spear	USA	4	C	126	2000	125			N Rosenberg	L Howe	H Feldman
42	2 Jul 1938	Extinguisher	GB	3	C	99	2000	125.2			E A Capelli	W Krog	C Barends
41	3 Jul 1937	Ballyjamesduff	GB	4	C	103	2000	125			Mrs M V Henkes	J Azzie	G Masterson
40	4 Jul 1936	Petersfield	GB	4	C	112	2000	125.4			J H Stodel	E Shaw	L Fernandez
39	6 Jul 1935	Eccentric	SAF	6	C	126	2000	124.8			A Rowe	A Rowe	G Askew
38	7 Jul 1934	Sun Tor	GB	5	C	93	2000	124.8			P Sussman	J Angles	A Rugg
37	1 Jul 1933	Legacy	GB	5	C	98	2000	124.4			W G Raw	P C Henwood	E Lariviere
36	2 Jul 1932	Findhorn	GB	5	C	96	2000	123.6			D Russell	E Ryan	S Johnson
35	4 Jul 1931	Agrippa	SAF	5	C	98	2000	127			G H O'Meara	W Pickering	R de Valle
34	5 Jul 1930	Full Dress	GB	7	C	123	2000	126.4			S Garrett	S Garrett	H Amos
33	6 Jul 1929	Gifted	GB	7	C	100	2000	127.4			W Jackson	W Jackson	G Lariviere
32	7 Jul 1928	Glen Albyn	GB	5	C	126	2000	123.8			S B Joel	G S Weale	A Herschell
31	2 Jul 1927	Hussein	GB	5	C	118	2000	124		D Fraser	J W S Langerman	C E Wade	G Gorton
30	3 Jul 1926	Moosme	GB	5	F	98	2000	124.6			G Lee	W Knapp	E Jacobie
29	4 Jul 1925	Bird of Prey	GB	4	C	115	2000	126			Sir A Bailey	W Randall	I Strydom
28	5 Jul 1924	Oriel	GB	5	C	88	2000	125.2			Messrs Deane and Hollis	E Ryan	J Lieveaux
27	7 Jul 1923	Eunomea	GB	6	F	90	2000	126.2			H Kiel	J Russell	J Otto
26	8 Jul 1922	Collet	SAF	5	F	91	2000	125.8			J Gard	J Gard	F McGrath
25	9 Jul 1921	Longstop	GB	4	C	115	2000	126.2			S B Joel	G S Weale	L Fernandez
24	3 Jul 1920	Pamphlet	GB	7	C	134	2000	125.6		J Musker	A Lavenstein	J Russell	S Garrett
23	5 Jul 1919	Goldwing	GB	6	C	96	2000	125.4			C A Hdley	J Russell	S Garrett
22	6 Jul 1918	Pamphlet	GB	5	C	122	2000	127		J Musker	A Briton	J Russell	C Bowles
21	7 Jul 1917	Fanous	GB	6	C	107	2000	126.6		W Crew	H C de Meillon	P R Little	W Crew
20	8 Jul 1916	Margin	GB	5	F	85	2000	125.8			Messrs Hime and Anderson	A C Townsend	W Clements
19	10 Jul 1915	Winnipeg	SAF	3	C	96	2000	125		Hon H Wyndham	Hon H Wyndham	H de Mestre	R Forsyth
18	11 Jul 1914	Rhanleigh	SAF	3	C	98	1800	114			Sir G Farrar	W Randall	R Dine
17	5 Jul 1913	Caged Bird	GB	5	F	101	1800	114			F W Murray	F Murray	W Crew
16	6 Jul 1912	Lombard	SAF	3	G	126	1676	103.8			F W Murray	F Murray	I Strydom
15	8 Jul 1911	Nobleman	SAF	2	C	105	1676	105			T Anders	F Murray	A Laird
14	9 Jul 1910	Sir Caulin	GB	6	C	118	1676	103.8			F W Murray	F Murray	E Hardy
13	10 Jul 1909	King's Favourite	GB	3	C	96	1676	106			Hon H Wyndham	H de Mestre	C Clark
12	4 Jul 1908	Corriecrian	SAF	5	C	114	1676	103			Messrs Hutt and Wade	F Wade	W Pickering
11	6 Jul 1907	Corriecrian	SAF	4	C	107	1676	103			C G Smith	F Wade	C Yarnell
10	7 Jul 1906	Bonnie Dundee	ARG	7	C	112	1676	104			J Piccione	W Pickering	W Pickering
9	15 Jul 1905	Chere Amie	AUS	4	G	117	1600	100			R Wootton	R Wootton	J McLaughlan
8	16 Jul 1904	Nymagee	AUS	5	C	84	1600	99.8			S Brooks	W Meredith	W Clements
7	25 Jul 1903	Peerless	SAF	3	F	119	1600	102.4		C Southey	H Nourse	John White	J White
6	12 Jul 1902	Chaos	SAF	3	C	101	1600	0		W Henwood	W Henwood	W Henwood	G Bowker
5	14 Jul 1901	Apollo	GB	7	C	118	1600	104.8			J Osler	H C Croon	C Macdonald
4	14 Jul 1900	Verdant Green	GB	5	C	93	1600	0			Messrs Osler and Blake	H C Croon	C Macdonald
3	17 Jul 1899	Talma	ARG	4	C	105	1600	0			Messrs Donaldson and Sivewright	HW Taylor	J Boardman
2	16 Jul 1898	Campanajo	GB	6	C	145	1600	0		R Scott	JA Peters	E Murray	G Skirving
1	17 Jul 1897	Campanajo	GB	5	C	144	1600	0		R Scott	Messrs Molynuex and FW Murray	E Murray	R Scott
