= Greyville Racecourse =

Racecourse in South Africa

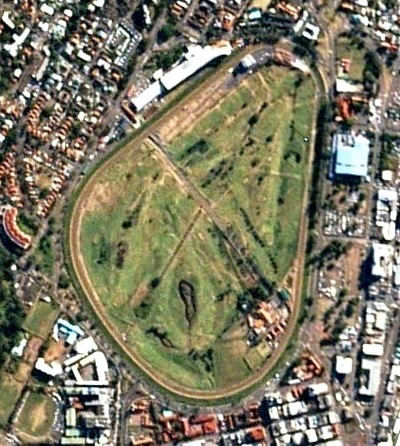
- Interactive map of Greyville Racecourse
- Location: Greyville, Berea, 4001, South Africa
- Coordinates: 29°50′41″S 31°0′50″E
- Date opened: July 1844
- Capacity: 55,000
- Notable races: Durban July; Gold Cup

Hollywoodbets Greyville Racecourse is a Thoroughbred horse race track in Durban, KwaZulu-Natal, South Africa. The 2,800 metre pear-shaped turf track consists of several gradient features: it is run uphill from the 2,400 metre mark to the 1,800 metre mark, after which it slopes gently downward for approximately the next 800 metres then uphill again into the nearly flat 500 metre homestretch. A 2,000 metre all-weather "Polytrack" was constructed inside the existing turf track in 2014 with the first races held in June that year.

The track's infield holds the Royal Durban Golf Club's Championship golf course.

Hollywoodbets Greyville Racecourse is host to the prestigious Hollywoodbets Durban July Handicap and in August, the World Pool Gold Cup, both Group One races that annually draw the best horses from around the country.

The history of horse racing in KwaZulu Natal goes back well over 150 years, with the first meeting held in July 1844, close to the site of the present course. Greyville Racecourse celebrated its centenary in 1996, the Durban July was first held in 1897 with only seven horses competing.

King George VI, Queen Elizabeth and Princesses Elizabeth and Margaret visited in 1947. Queen Elizabeth II and the Duke of Edinburgh also dropped by in 1995. The track staged South Africa's first-ever Sunday meeting in February 1996 and became the first to race under floodlights.

On Thursday 27 June 2019, Hollywoodbets was announced as the naming rights sponsor for both Greyville and Scottsville racecourses. The racecourses will now be known as Hollywoodbets Greyville Racecourse and Hollywoodbets Scottsville Racecourse.
