= List of United Arab Emirates horse races =

A list of notable flat horse races which take place annually in the United Arab Emirates, including all conditions races which currently hold Group 1, 2 or 3 status.

== Group 1 ==
Month	Race Name	Racecourse	Dist. (m)	Surface	Age/Sex
January	Jebel Hatta	Meydan	1,800	Turf	4yo+
January	Al Maktoum Challenge	Meydan	2,000	Dirt	4yo+
March	Al Quoz Sprint	Meydan	1,200	Turf	3yo+
March	Dubai Golden Shaheen	Meydan	1,200	Dirt	3yo+
March	Dubai Sheema Classic	Meydan	2,410	Turf	4yo+
March	Dubai Turf	Meydan	1,800	Turf	4yo+
March	Dubai World Cup	Meydan	2,000	Dirt	4yo+

== Group 2 ==
Race Name	Racecourse	Dist. (m)	Surface	Age/Sex
Al Fahidi Fort	Meydan	1,400	Turf	4yo+
Al Rashidiya	Meydan	1,800	Turf	4yo+
Balanchine	Meydan	1,800	Turf	4yo+ f&m
Cape Verdi	Meydan	1,600	Turf	4yo+ f&m
Dubai City of Gold	Meydan	2,410	Turf	4yo+
Dubai Gold Cup	Meydan	3,200	Turf	4yo+
Godolphin Mile	Meydan	1,600	Dirt	4yo+
Al Maktoum Mile	Meydan	1,600	Dirt	4yo+
Al Maktoum Classic	Meydan	1,900	Dirt	4yo+
Meydan Sprint	Meydan	1,000	Turf	3yo+
Singspiel Stakes	Meydan	1,800	Turf	4yo+
UAE Derby	Meydan	1,900	Dirt	3yo
Zabeel Mile	Meydan	1,600	Turf	3yo+

== Group 3 ==
Race Name	Racecourse	Dist. (m)	Surface	Age/Sex
Abu Dhabi Championship	Abu Dhabi	2,200	Turf	4yo+
Al Shindagha Sprint	Meydan	1,200	Dirt	3yo+
Burj Nahaar	Meydan	1,600	Dirt	4yo+
Dubai Millennium Stakes	Meydan	2,000	Turf	4yo+
Dubawi Stakes	Meydan	1,200	Dirt	3yo+
Firebreak Stakes	Meydan	1,600	Dirt	4yo+
Jebel Ali Mile	Jebel Ali	1,600	Dirt	4yo+
Mahab Al Shimaal	Meydan	1,200	Dirt	3yo+
Nad Al Sheba Trophy	Meydan	2,810	Turf	4yo+
Nad Al Sheba Turf Sprint	Meydan	1,200	Turf	3yo+
UAE Oaks	Meydan	1,900	Dirt	3yo f
UAE 2000 Guineas	Meydan	1,600	Dirt	3yo

== Listed races ==
Race Name	Racecourse	Dist. (m)	Surface	Age/Sex
Dubai Racing Club Classic	Meydan	2,410	Turf	3yo+
Meydan Challenge	Meydan	1,400	Turf	3yo+
Zabeel Turf	Meydan	2,000	Turf	3yo+
Meydan Cup	Meydan	2,810	Turf	4yo+
Dubai Sprint	Meydan	1,200	Turf	3yo+
Curlin Handicap	Meydan	2,000	Dirt	4yo+
Al Bastakiya	Meydan	1,900	Dirt	3yo
President Cup	Abu Dhabi	1,400	Turf	4yo+
Jebel Ali Stakes	Jebel Ali	1,950	Dirt	4yo+
Jebel Ali Sprint	Jebel Ali	1,000	Dirt	3yo+
Meydan Classic	Meydan	1,400	Turf	3yo
National Day Cup	Abu Dhabi	1,600	Turf	3yo+
Dubai Creek Mile	Meydan	1,600	Dirt	3yo+
Entisar	Meydan	2,000	Dirt	3yo+
Garhoud Sprint	Meydan	1,200	Dirt	2yo+
UAE 1000 Guineas	Meydan	1,600	Dirt	3yo f
Business Bay Challenge	Meydan	1,400	Turf	4yo+
