= Desert Flower (horse) =

Irish Thoroughbred racehorse

- Sire: Night of Thunder
- Grandsire: Dubawi
- Dam: Promising Run
- Damsire: Hard Spun
- Sex: Filly
- Foaled: 5 March 2022
- Country: Ireland
- Colour: Chestnut
- Breeder: Godolphin
- Owner: Gololphin
- Trainer: Charlie Appleby
- Record: 6: 5-0-1
- Earnings: £739,503

Major wins
- May Hill Stakes (2024); Fillies' Mile (2024); 1000 Guineas (2025)

Desert Flower (foaled 5 March 2022) is an Irish-bred, British-trained Thoroughbred racehorse. She was unbeaten in four races as a juvenile in 2024 including the May Hill Stakes and Fillies' Mile. On her three-year-old debut she won the 1000 Guineas and then finished third when favourite for the Oaks Stakes.

== Background ==
Desert Flower is a chestnut filly with a large white star and white socks on her hind legs bred in Ireland by her owners Godolphin. She was sent into training with Charlie Appleby at Moulton Paddocks stable in Newmarket, Suffolk. She has been ridden in all but one of her races by William Buick.

She was from the sixth crop of foals sired by 2000 Guineas winner Night of Thunder, whose other progeny have included Thundering Nights, Highfield Princess (Nunthorpe Stakes) and Economics (Irish Champion Stakes). Desert Flower's dam Promising Run was a very successful racemare, winning the Rockfel Stakes, Al Rashidiya, Balanchine and Cape Verdi. She was a female-line descendant of Somethingroyal, the dam of Secretariat.

== Racing career ==
=== 2024: two-year-old season ===
Desert Flower began her racing career in a seven furlong maiden race on good ground at Newmarket Racecourse on 13 July when she started the 5/2 second favourite in a ten-runner field. After starting slowly she made steady progress in the second half of the race, took the lead a furlong from the finish and drew away to win by three and a quarter lengths from the favourite Flight. Billy Loughnane took the ride when the filly started 1/4 favourite for a Novice race over the same course and distance on 3 August. She gained the advantage approaching the last quarter mile and drew away from her five opponents to win in "impressive" style by six and a half lengths.

On 12 September Desert Flower was stepped up in class and distance for the Group 2 May Hill Stakes over one mile at Doncaster Racecourse and started the even money favourite ahead of the Aidan O'Brien trained pair January (winner of the Churchill Stakes) and Ecstatic. With Buick again the saddle she tracked the leaders before taking the lead inside the final furlong and won "comfortably" by one and a half lengths from January. After the race Buick said “That was very pleasing. Obviously she’s done everything right so far and you look at her and she’s a nice, big filly with plenty of scope for next year... I was delighted with her... She came into the race very easily, which is the sign of a quality horse".

For her final run of the season Desert Flower was moved to the highest class to contest the Group 1 Fillies' Mile at Newmarket on 11 October. She started 11/10 favourite ahead of January, while the other five contenders included Tabiti (Dick Poole Fillies' Stakes) and Dreamy (Flame of Tara Stakes). She started well and was always in contention before overtaking January a furlong out and going clear of the field to win by five and a half lengths. Charlie Appleby commented "She paraded very well and everything was nice and calm and collected. She will be a more mature filly for this in the spring. She is a filly who has pleased us, we were confident in her maiden and she has just kept pleasing us throughout. The team were very positive coming into today that if she was good enough she had done everything right at home. She is a big, scopey filly, if she puts another 20 kilos on over the winter I will be delighted to see her in the spring."

In the official European classification for 2024 Desert Flower was rated the second best juvenile filly of the year, two pounds behind the Irish-trained Lake Victoria, who had won the Moyglare Stud Stakes, Cheveley Park Stakes and Breeders' Cup Juvenile Fillies Turf.

=== 2025: three-year-old season ===
On her three-year-old debut Desert Flower, with Buick in the saddle, started the even money favourite for the 212th running of the 1000 Guineas on good to firm ground at Newmarket on 4 May. Lake Victoria was the 9/4 second choice in the betting while the other eight runners included Duty First (Fred Darling Stakes), Flight and Simmering (Prix du Calvados). Desert Flower started well, took the early lead and was never headed keeping on well in the closing stages to win by a length from Flight, with Simmering a length further back in third. After the race Appleby said "When people ask me is she the best filly we’ve had, she is by far, yes. The filly herself is the one who deserves the plaudits. She’s unbeaten and we came here with a lot of confidence as everyone knows, and she’s gone and delivered. It’s her day. I see no reason why she can’t potentially stretch up to the mile-and-a-half [in the Oaks].”

On 6 June Desert Flower started the 11/10 favourite in a nine-runner field for the 247th running of the Oaks Stakes over one and a half miles at Epsom Downs Racecourse. After racing just behind the leaders she was briefly outpaced early in the straight and despite making steady progress she never looked likely to win and came home third behind Minnie Hauk and Whirl.

== Pedigree ==
Pedigree of Desert Flower (IRE), chestnut filly, 2022
Sire Night of Thunder (IRE) 2011	Dubawi (IRE); 2002	Dubai Millennium (GB)	Seeking The Gold (USA)
Sire Night of Thunder (IRE) 2011	Dubawi (IRE); 2002	Dubai Millennium (GB)	Colorado Dancer (IRE)
Sire Night of Thunder (IRE) 2011	Dubawi (IRE); 2002	Zomaradah (GB)	Deploy
Sire Night of Thunder (IRE) 2011	Dubawi (IRE); 2002	Zomaradah (GB)	Jawaher (IRE)
Sire Night of Thunder (IRE) 2011	Forest Storm (GB); 2006	Galileo (IRE)	Sadler's Wells (USA)
Sire Night of Thunder (IRE) 2011	Forest Storm (GB); 2006	Galileo (IRE)	Urban Sea (USA)
Sire Night of Thunder (IRE) 2011	Forest Storm (GB); 2006	Quiet Storm (IRE)	Desert Prince
Sire Night of Thunder (IRE) 2011	Forest Storm (GB); 2006	Quiet Storm (IRE)	Hertford Castle (GB)
Dam Promising Rub (USA) 2013	Hard Spun (USA); 2004	Danzig	Northern Dancer (CAN)
Dam Promising Rub (USA) 2013	Hard Spun (USA); 2004	Danzig	Pas de Nom
Dam Promising Rub (USA) 2013	Hard Spun (USA); 2004	Turkish Tryst	Turkoman
Dam Promising Rub (USA) 2013	Hard Spun (USA); 2004	Turkish Tryst	Darbyvail
Dam Promising Rub (USA) 2013	Aviacion (BRZ); 1998	Know Heights (IRE)	Shirley Heights (GB)
Dam Promising Rub (USA) 2013	Aviacion (BRZ); 1998	Know Heights (IRE)	Unknown Lady (USA)
Dam Promising Rub (USA) 2013	Aviacion (BRZ); 1998	Arbulus (USA)	Liloy (FR)
Dam Promising Rub (USA) 2013	Aviacion (BRZ); 1998	Arbulus (USA)	Buck The Tide (Family: 2-s)
