= Zabeel Mile =

- Class: Group Two
- Location: Meydan Racecourse; Dubai, United Arab Emirates
- Inaugurated: 2007
- Race type: Thoroughbred - Flat racing

Race information
- Distance: 1,600 metres
- Surface: Turf
- Track: Left-handed
- Purse: $250,000

The Zabeel Mile, is a horse race run over a distance of 1,600 metres (one mile) on turf in late February or early March at Meydan Racecourse in Dubai. The race is named after a locality in Western Dubai. Not related with New Zealand stallion Zabeel.

It was first contested in 2007 at Nad Al Sheba Racecourse before being transferred to Meydan in 2010.

The Zabeel Mile began as a Listed race. The race was elevated to Group 3 level in 2009 and became a Group 2 event in 2011.

== Records ==
Record time:

- 1:34.28 - Master of The Seas 2023 (New track record)

Most successful horse (2 wins):

- Safety Check – 2015, 2016

Most wins by a jockey:

- 5 - William Buick 2015, 2016, 2019, 2021, 2023

Most wins by a trainer:

- 6 - Charlie Appleby 2015, 2016, 2019, 2020, 2021, 2023

Most wins by an owner:

- 9 - Godolphin Racing 2008, 2011, 2012, 2015, 2016, 2019, 2020, 2021, 2023

== Winners ==
Year	Winner	Age	Jockey	Trainer	Owner	Time
2007	Kapil	4	Weichong Marwing	Mike de Kock	Fullard, Drew, Watson-Smith & Gabler	1:37.70
2008 (div. 1)	Wise Dennis	6	Ted Durcan	Alan Jarvis	Allen B Pope, Andrew J King	1:39:27
2008 (div. 2)	Third Set	5	Frankie Dettori	Saeed bin Suroor	Godolphin	1:39:63
2009	Archipenko	5	Kevin Shea	Mike de Kock	Mohammed bin Khalifa Al Maktoum & A H Parker	1:39.89
2010	Imbongi	5	Christophe Soumillon	Mike de Kock	Mohammed bin Khalifa Al Maktoum & B Clements	1:38.64
2011	Rileyskeepingfaith	5	Ahmed Ajtebi	Mahmood Al Zarooni	Godolphin	1:37.89
2012	Do It All	5	Silvestre de Sousa	Saeed bin Suroor	Godolphin	1:38.98
2013	Trade Storm	5	Jamie Spencer	David Simcock	Universal Racing	1:38.74
2014	Mshawish	4	Richard Hughes	Mikel Delzangles	Al Shaqab Racing	1:37.16
2015	Safety Check	4	William Buick	Charlie Appleby	Godolphin	1:35.53
2016	Safety Check	5	William Buick	Charlie Appleby	Godolphin	1:36.45
2017	Championship	6	Colm O'Donoghue	A bin Harmash	Sheikh Mansoor bin Mohammed al Maktoum	1:35.19
2018	Janoobi	4	Jim Crowley	Mike de Kock	Hamdan Al Maktoum	1:35.27
2019	Mythical Magic	4	William Buick	Charlie Appleby	Godolphin	1:36.39
2020	Zakouski	4	James Doyle	Charlie Appleby	Godolphin	1:35.93
2021	D'Bai	7	William Buick	Charlie Appleby	Godolphin	1:35.94
2022	Real World	5	Daniel Tudhope	Saeed bin Suroor	Godolphin	1:35.36
2023	Master of The Seas	5	William Buick	Charlie Appleby	Godolphin	1:34.28
2024	San Donato	8	Pat Dobbs	Doug Watson	Sheikh Mohammed Obaid Al Maktoum	1:34.46
2025	Poker Face	6	Pat Dobbs	Simon & Ed Crisford	Edward Ware	1:36.45
2026	Quddwah	6	James Doyle	Simon & Ed Crisford	Sheikh Ahmed Al Maktoum	1:35.81

== See also ==
- List of United Arab Emirates horse races
