= Mahab Al Shimaal =

- Class: Group 3
- Location: Meydan Racecourse; Dubai, United Arab Emirates
- Inaugurated: 2001
- Race type: Thoroughbred - Flat racing

Race information
- Distance: 1,200 metres
- Surface: Dirt
- Track: Straight
- Qualification: 3-y-o+
- Purse: $350,000

The Mahab Al Shimaal, is a horse race for horses aged three and over, run at a distance of 1,200 metres (six furlongs) on dirt in March at Meydan Racecourse in Dubai.

The Mahab Al Shimaal was first contested in 2001 on dirt at Nad Al Sheba Racecourse. It was moved to Meydan in 2010 where it was run on a synthetic Tapeta surface until reverting to dirt in 2015.

== Records ==
Record time:

- 1:09.59 - Diabolical 2008

Most successful horse:

- 3 - Conroy 2002, 2003, 2004

Most wins by a jockey:

- 2 - Frankie Dettori 2004, 2010
- 2 - Kerrin McEvoy 2003, 2008
- 2 - Richard Mullen 2005, 2013
- 2 - Ryan Moore 2007, 2011

Most wins by a trainer:

- 3 - Saeed bin Suroor 2008, 2009, 2010
- 3 - Adi Selvaratnam 2002, 2003, 2004
- 3 - Bhupat Seemar 2023, 2024, 2025

Most wins by an owner:

- 3 - Mohammed Al Jamali 2002, 2003, 2004
- 3 - Godolphin 2008, 2009, 2010

== Winners ==
Year	Winner	Age	Jockey	Trainer	Owner	Time
2001	Active Bo Bo	6	Robert Burke	Y T Lam	Wong Chiu Ying	1:10.14
2002	Conroy	4	Gary Hind	Adi Selvaratnam	Mohammed Al Jamali	1:09.92
2003	Conroy	5	Kerrin McEvoy	Adi Selvaratnam	Mohammed Al Jamali	1:11.30
2004	Conroy	5	Frankie Dettori	Adi Selvaratnam	Mohammed Al Jamali	1:11.04
2005	Estimraar	8	Richard Mullen	Mazin Al Kurdi	Rashid bin Mohammed	1:10.71
2006	Tropical Star	6	Royston Ffrench	Ali Rashid Al Rayhi	Mohammed bin Maktoum Al Maktoum	1:10.92
2007	Terrific Challenge	5	Ryan Moore	Doug Watson	Rashid bin Mohammed	1:09.66
2008	Diabolical	5	Kerrin McEvoy	Saeed bin Suroor	Godolphin	1:09.59
2009	Gayego	4	Ted Durcan	Saeed bin Suroor	Godolphin	1:11.19
2010	Desert Party	4	Frankie Dettori	Saeed bin Suroor	Godolphin	1:10.82
2011	Bankable	7	Ryan Moore	Herman Brown	Ramzan Kadyrov	1:11.52
2012	Krypton Factor	4	Kieren Fallon	Fawzi Abdulla Nass	Fawzi Abdulla Nass	1:11.56
2013	Reynaldothewizard	7	Richard Mullen	Satish Seemar	Zabeel Racing International	1:11.89
2014	Rich Tapestry	6	Olivier Doleuze	Michael Chang	Silas Yang, Wong Tak Wai et al	1:11.70
2015	Shaishee	5	Silvestre de Sousa	Musabbeh Al Mheiri	Hamdan Al Maktoum	1:12.13
2016	Muarrab	7	Paul Hanagan	Musabbeh Al Mheiri	Hamdan Al Maktoum	1:10.20
2017	Morawij	7	Chris Hayes	Dhruba Selvaratnam	Ahmed Al Maktoum	1:11.23
2018	Jordan Sport	5	Adrie de Vries	Fawzi Abdulla Nass	Fawzi Abdulla Nass	1:10.18
2019	Drafted	5	Pat Dobbs	Doug Watson	Misty Hollow Farm	1:11.66
2020	Wafy	5	Tadhg O'Shea	Satish Seemar	Nasir Askar	1:11.89
2021	Canvassed	6	Pat Dobbs	Doug Watson	Mohammed Obaid Al Maktoum	1:10.20
2022	Eastern World	5	Ray Dawson	Ahmad bin Harmash	Mohammed Ahmad Ali Al Subousi	1:11.14
2023	Sound Money	5	Mickael Barzalona	Bhupat Seemar	RRR Racing	1:11.05
2024	Leading Spirit	8	Patrick Cosgrave	Bhupat Seemar	Touch Gold Racing	1:11.59
2025	Tuz	8	Tadhg O'Shea	Bhupat Seemar	Dakki Stable	1:10.22
2026	El Nasseeb	5	Silvestre De Sousa	Musabbeh Al Mheiri	Mohd Abdulla Mohd Rashed Al Shehhi	1:11.31

== See also ==
- List of United Arab Emirates horse races
