= Firebreak Stakes =

- Class: Group 3
- Location: Meydan Racecourse; Dubai, United Arab Emirates
- Inaugurated: 2011
- Race type: Thoroughbred - Flat racing

Race information
- Distance: 1,600 metres
- Surface: Dirt
- Track: Left-handed
- Qualification: 4-y-o+
- Purse: $200,000

The Firebreak Stakes, is a horse race, for horses aged four and over, run over a distance of 1,600 metres (one mile) on dirt in February at Meydan Racecourse in Dubai. The race is named in honour of the racehorse Firebreak, who won the Hong Kong Mile for Godolphin in 2004.

The Firebreak Stakes was first contested in 2011 as a Listed race and was elevated to Group 3 level a year later. It was run on a synthetic Tapeta surface before moving to dirt in 2015.

== Records ==
Record time:

- 1:35.45 - Tamarkuz 2015

Most successful horse (2 wins):

- 2 - Hypothetical 2022, 2024

Most wins by a jockey:

- 4 - Mickael Barzalona 2018, 2020, 2022, 2024

Most wins by a trainer:

- 4 - Salem bin Ghadayer 2018, 2020, 2022, 2024

Most wins by an owner:

- 4 - Godolphin 2011, 2012, 2013, 2016

== Winners ==
Year	Winner	Age	Jockey	Trainer	Owner	Time
2011	Skysurfers	5	Frankie Dettori	Saeed bin Suroor	Godolphin	1:35.77
2012	Sandagiyr	4	Silvestre de Sousa	Saeed bin Suroor	Godolphin	1:36.29
2013	Moonwalk In Paris	5	Ahmed Ajtebi	Mahmood Al Zarooni	Godolphin	1:36.39
2014	Variety Club	5	Anton Marcus	Joey Ramsden	Ingrid & Markus Jooste	1:35.67
2015	Tamarkuz	5	Paul Hanagan	Musabah Al Muhairi	Hamdan Al Maktoum	1:35.45
2016	Confrontation	6	William Buick	Kiaran McLaughlin	Godolphin	1:37.37
2017	North America	5	Richard Mullen	Satish Seemar	Imhamed Nagem	1:36.71
2018	Heavy Metal	8	Mickael Barzalona	Salem bin Ghadayer	Hamdan bin Mohammed Al Maktoum	1:36.74
2019	Muntazah	6	Jim Crowley	Doug Watson	Hamdan Al Maktoum	1:38.21
2020	Capezzano	6	Mickael Barzalona	Salem bin Ghadayer	Sultan Ali	1:36.23
2021	Secret Ambition	8	Tadhg O'Shea	Satish Seemar	Nasir Askar	1:36.12
2022	Hypothetical	5	Mickael Barzalona	Salem bin Ghadayer	Hamdan bin Mohammed Al Maktoum	1:36.82
2023	Prince Eiji	7	Sam Hitchcott	Doug Watson	Sh Mohammed Obaid Al Maktoum	1:39:06
2024	Hypothetical	7	Mickael Barzalona	Salem bin Ghadayer	Hamdan bin Mohammed Al Maktoum	1:37.89
2025	King Gold	8	Adrie de Vries	N Caullery	Mme Christian Wingtans	1:36.70
2026	Mendelssohn Bay	5	Richard Mullen	Bhupat Seemar	Suited & Booted Racing Syndicate	1:38.49

== See also ==
- List of United Arab Emirates horse races
