= Master of The Seas =

Irish-bred Thoroughbred racehorse

- Racing silks of Godolphin
- Sire: Dubawi
- Grandsire: Dubai Millennium
- Dam: Firth of Lorne
- Damsire: Danehill
- Sex: Gelding
- Foaled: March 4, 2018
- Country: Ireland
- Colour: Bay
- Breeder: Godolphin
- Owner: Godolphin
- Trainer: Charlie Appleby
- Record: 17: 9 - 3 - 2
- Earnings: US$2,520,582

Major wins
- Saratoga Derby (2023); Woodbine Mile (2023); Breeders' Cup Mile (2023); Maker's Mark Mile (2024)
- Last updated on April 13, 2024

Master of The Seas (foaled March 4, 2018) is a multiple Grade 1 winning Irish-bred British-trained Thoroughbred racehorse. The horse has raced in Great Britain, Ireland, United Arab Emirates, Canada and United States. In 2023 the horse won the Woodbine Mile and Breeders' Cup Mile at Santa Anita Park.

== Background ==
Master of The Seas is a bay gelding who was bred and owned by Sheikh Mohammed's Godolphin organisation. He was sent into training with Charlie Appleby, whose stable is based at Newmarket, Suffolk, but typically relocates to Dubai in winter.

He was sired by Dubawi, a son of Dubai Millennium, whose major victories included the Irish 2,000 Guineas and the Prix Jacques Le Marois. As a breeding stallion, Dubawi became one of the leading sires in thoroughbred racing, producing major winners including Monterosso, Al Kazeem, Makfi, Lucky Nine and Night of Thunder. In 2023, Dubawi was listed as the world's most expensive publicly advertised stallion standing at a fee off £350,000 at Darley's Dalham Hall Stud in England for the 2024 breeding season.

Master of The Seas is the 10th of 12 foals and one of eight winners from Firth of Lorne, an Irish mare who won three races, twice in France including the Listed Prix des Sablonnets at Nantes's Petit Port racecourse and an allowance race at Bay Meadows Racetrack in the United States. She also ran second in the 2003 renewal of the Group 1 French 1000 Guineas (Poule d'Essai des Pouliches)

== Career ==
=== 2020: two-year-old season ===
As a two-year-old Master of The Seas debut in a Novice event at on June 18, 2020, over seven furlongs at Newmarket. Starting at odds of 10/3 in a four horse field he defeated William Bligh by 3/4 length with stablemate Yibir who was the favourite over 10 lengths away in third and would later win the Breeders' Cup Turf in the United States and become Champion Male Turf Horse the following year. The following month was entered in the Group 2 Superlative Stakes, again at Newmarket over the same distance of seven furlongs winning by two lengths. Master of The Seas had one more start as a two-year-old where he was shipped to Ireland and where raced keenly when defeated into fourth place in the Group 1 Goffs Vincent O'Brien National Stakes at The Curragh.

=== 2021: three-year-old season ===
In preparation for his three-year-old season Master of The Seas was sent to the United Arab Emirates. On the February 25 he ran in the Listed Meydan Classic Sponsored By Agnc3, and Appleby decided he would race Master of The Seas in a hood after his effort in Ireland. As a short 4/11 odds-on favorite with British bookmakers Master of The Seas was soundly defeated by his stablemate Naval Crown. Master of The Seas returned to England and on April 15 was victorious in the Group 3 Craven Stakes a preparatory event for the 2000 Guineas. Jockey William Buick, won second Craven after Masar's victory in 2018, was impressed with the power Master of The Seas. "I think he's a Guineas horse," said the rider. "Only the very good ones manage to quicken down the Dip and when they hit the rising ground they go again, and that's what this fella did. When he ran in Dubai it was a bit of a mess, and I'm just glad to get him back on track."

On May 1, Master of The Seas started at 6/1 in the 2000 Guineas at Newmarket. Jockey William Buick held Master Of The Seas in the rear before making steady headway from the halfway mark. He briefly led over a furlong out but just failed at the line to hold off Poetic Flare. A couple weeks after the event connections announced that Master of The Seas had a setback after training and would be on the easy list for two to four weeks - missing Royal Ascot and would have a short spell on the sidelines.

Master of The Seas returned from a spell on September 25 in the Group 2 Joel Stakes. Starting as the 11/8 favourite he finished third to Benbatl who set a track record for the Rowley Mile in 1:34.56.

In his last start in 2021 in the Group 1 Queen Elizabeth II Stakes, Master of The Seas made little impression as he was soundly beaten into seventh place by Baaeed.

After his three-year-old season Master of The Seas was gelded.

=== 2022: four-year-old season ===
On April 12, after a break of nearly six months Master of The Seas started in the Group 3 Earl of Sefton Stakes over a distance of 1 1/8 miles and was positioned in a handy fourth after a good start. Inching closer once leaving the half-mile pole behind, he loomed large at the quarter-mile marker and was ridden out once gaining a narrow advantage entering the final furlong to defeat the G2 Dante Stakes runner-up and G3 Sovereign Stakes victor Megallan in comfortable fashion. Trainer Appleby had hoped to take Master Of The Seas to the G1 Queen Anne Stakes to face Baaeed at Royal Ascot but suffered a setback after the event and was sent to the paddock to recover. Master of The Seas did not have another start in 2022. After recovery he was shipped to the United Arab Emirates.

=== 2023: five-year-old season ===
On January 20 Master of The Seas returned from a nine months' spell in the Group 2 Zabeel Mile on the Meydan Racecourse in the United Arab Emirates. He had to fend off the late challenge of the David O'Meara-trained Shelir, who was denied a clear run when making headway, but Master Of The Seas had too much and held on by half a length. Jockey William Buick, who won the Zabeel Mile for the fifth time, let Master of The Seas draft just behind the leaders down the backstretch and was in perfect position to exploit a gap between them at mid-stretch. The 5-year-old shot through and won with authority, dropping the course record by a fraction to 1:34.28. Trainer Appleby said, "Hopefully he comes out of this and we can get a nice clean run with him through to Super Saturday for the Jebel Hatta, and all being well, he'll head on to the Dubai Turf."

In the Jebel Hatta, Master of The Seas finished third to Alfareeq and three weeks later in the Dubai Turf was a well beaten 13th to Lord North. Master of The Seas returned to England and was turned out for a spell.

After the short spell Master of The Seas was entered in the Group 2 Fred Cowley MBE Memorial Summer Mile Stakes at Ascot Racecourse. Outsiders Classic Causeway and New Kingdom opened up a huge lead in the early stages only to capitulate on the home turn, with Master of The Seas sweeping through from off the pace to win the third Group 2 of his career by four lengths. Connections indicated that Master of The Seas could next appear in the G1 Sussex Stakes or travel to the United States and run in the Grade 1 Fourstardave Handicap at Saratoga Racetrack.

Connections decided to send Master of The Seas to Canada with the hope of later running him in the Breeders' Cup. On September 16, Master of The Seas did not get off to the best of starts in the Woodbine Mile at Woodbine Racetrack as he was last out of the gate and trailed all five rivals through the early going. Jockey William Buick, calmly allowed him to find his stride and pushed the button at the top of the lane with gratifying results. Master of The Seas as the 2/5 odds-on favorite stopped the timer at 1:33.79 on good turf winning his first Grade I event by 3 3/4 lengths and earning a Breeders' Cup Challenge "Win and You're In" spot in G1 Breeders' Cup Mile at Santa Anita Park.

On October 7, Master of The Seas was entered in the Grade 1 Coolmore Turf Mile at Keeneland. Here he faced a tougher opponent in Up to the Mark who had earlier in 2023 with a powerful closing finish was able to win back-to-back grade 1 wins in the Turf Classic and Manhattan Stakes. the two favorites raced nearly next to each other for much of the journey with getting Master of The Seas the jump on Up to the Mark into the stretch. In the battle to the finishing line Up to the Mark won the tight battle by a shortest of distances - a nose. "He was beaten by a good horse," trainer Appleby said. "We thought (Up to the Mark's) lack of fitness would give us the edge there, but he nosed us on the line."

In the Breeders' Cup Mile, Master of The Seas drew the widest post - fourteen. In pre-race discussions, Buick and Appleby strategized for the rider to take Master of The Seas back, hope for a quick pace, and call on the gelding's acceleration to make up the difference. The plan worked to perfection, though only just. Master of The Seas needed to pass 10 horses down the lane to win and stuck his nose of Mawj in front a stride or two before the finish. Master of The Seas starting at odds 33-10 raced a mile on firm turf in 1:32.45, following quick fractions of :22.16, :45.37 and 1:09.12. In addition to capturing the Mile for the third time, the Charlie Appleby notched his 10th Breeders' Cup victory from 20 starters and William Buick won his eighth Breeders' Cup race.

== Statistics ==
Date	Distance	Race	Grade Group	Track	Odds	Field	Finish	Winning Time	Winning (Losing) Margin	Jockey	Ref
2020 – two-year-old season
Jun 18, 2020	7 furlongs	Novice Stakes		Newmarket	100/30	4	1	1:28.06	3/4 length	Brett Doyle	
Jul 11, 2020	7 furlongs	Superlative Stakes	II	Newmarket	4/1	10	1	1:23.95	3 lengths	William Buick	
Sep 13, 2020	7 furlongs	National Stakes	I	The Curragh	2/1*	10	4	1:28.53	(2 lengths)	William Buick	
2021 – three-year-old season
Feb 25, 2021	1600 metres	Meydan Classic	Listed	Meydan (UAE)	N/A (Note: Master of The Seas final odds with British bookmakers were 4/11on favourite since gambling is prohibited in the United Arab Emirates)	6	2	1:36.52	(1 3/4 lengths)	William Buick	
Apr 15, 2021	1 mile	Craven Stakes	III	Newmarket	11/4*	10	1	1:38.79	3/4 length	William Buick	
May 1, 2021	1 mile	2000 Guineas	I	Newmarket	6/1	14	2	1:35.69	(short head)	William Buick	
Sep 24, 2021	1 mile	Joel Stakes	II	Newmarket	11/8*	7	3	1:34:56 (Note: The winner Benbatl set a track record for the Rowley Mile)	(1 1/4 lengths)	William Buick	
Oct 16, 2021	1 mile	Queen Elizabeth II Stakes	I	Ascot	11/1	10	7	1:42.57	(6 1/4 lengths)	William Buick	
2022 – four-year-old season
Apr 12, 2022	1 1/8 miles	Earl of Sefton Stakes	III	Newmarket	5/4*	7	1	1:49.60	1 1/2 lengths	William Buick	
2023 – five-year-old season
Jan 20, 2023	1600 metres	Zabeel Mile	II	Meydan (UAE)	N/A (Note: Master of The Seas final odds with British bookmakers were 1/2on favourite since gambling is prohibited in the United Arab Emirates)	8	1	1:34:28 (Note: Master of The Seas set a track record for the 1600 meter distance at Meydan)	1/2 length	William Buick	
Mar 4, 2023	1800 metres	Jebel Hatta	I	Meydan (UAE)	N/A (Note: Master of The Seas final odds with British bookmakers were 5/4 favourite since gambling is prohibited in the United Arab Emirates)	14	3	1:48:19	(1/2 length)	William Buick	
Mar 25, 2023	1800 metres	Dubai Turf	I	Meydan (UAE)	N/A (Note: Master of The Seas final odds with British bookmakers were 11/2 since gambling is prohibited in the United Arab Emirates)	14	13	1:47:39	(18 1/4 lengths)	James Doyle	
Jul 15, 2023	7 furlongs 213 yards	Summer Mile Stakes	II	Ascot	11/2	8	1	1:45.54	4 lengths	James Doyle	
Sep 16, 2023	1 mile	Woodbine Mile	I	Woodbine	0.40*	6	1	1:33.79	3 3/4 lengths	William Buick	
Oct 7, 2023	1 mile	Coolmore Turf Mile	I	Keeneland	2.29	9	2	1:34.18	(nose)	James Doyle	
Nov 4, 2023	1 mile	Breeders' Cup Mile	I	Santa Anita	3.30	13	1	1:32.45	nose	William Buick	
2024 – six-year-old season
Apr 12, 2024	1 mile	Maker's Mark Mile	I	Keeneland	0.77*	6	1	1:37.10	2 1/4 lengths	William Buick	

Notes:
An (*) asterisk after the odds means Master of The Seas was the post-time favorite.

== Pedigree ==
Pedigree of Master of The Seas (IRE), bay horse, March 4, 2018
Sire Dubawi (IRE) (2002)	Dubai Millennium (GB) (1996)	Seeking the Gold (1985)	Mr. Prospector (1970)
Sire Dubawi (IRE) (2002)	Dubai Millennium (GB) (1996)	Seeking the Gold (1985)	Con Game (1974)
Sire Dubawi (IRE) (2002)	Dubai Millennium (GB) (1996)	Colorado Dancer (IRE) (1986)	Shareef Dancer (1980)
Sire Dubawi (IRE) (2002)	Dubai Millennium (GB) (1996)	Colorado Dancer (IRE) (1986)	Fall Aspen (1976)
Sire Dubawi (IRE) (2002)	Zomaradah (GB) (1995)	Deploy (GB) (1987)	Shirley Heights (GB) (1975)
Sire Dubawi (IRE) (2002)	Zomaradah (GB) (1995)	Deploy (GB) (1987)	Slightly Dangerous (1979)
Sire Dubawi (IRE) (2002)	Zomaradah (GB) (1995)	Jawaher (IRE) (1989)	Dancing Brave (1983)
Sire Dubawi (IRE) (2002)	Zomaradah (GB) (1995)	Jawaher (IRE) (1989)	High Tern (IRE) (1982)
Dam Firth of Lorne (IRE) (1999)	Danehill (1986)	Danzig (1977)	Northern Dancer (CAN) (1961)
Dam Firth of Lorne (IRE) (1999)	Danehill (1986)	Danzig (1977)	Pas de Nom (1968)
Dam Firth of Lorne (IRE) (1999)	Danehill (1986)	Razyana (1981)	His Majesty (1968)
Dam Firth of Lorne (IRE) (1999)	Danehill (1986)	Razyana (1981)	Spring Adieu (CAN) (1974)
Dam Firth of Lorne (IRE) (1999)	Kerrera (IRE) (1986)	Diesis (GB) (1980)	Sharpen Up (GB) (1969)
Dam Firth of Lorne (IRE) (1999)	Kerrera (IRE) (1986)	Diesis (GB) (1980)	Doubly Sure (FR) (1971)
Dam Firth of Lorne (IRE) (1999)	Kerrera (IRE) (1986)	Rimosa's Pet (GB) (1976)	Petingo (GB) (1965)
Dam Firth of Lorne (IRE) (1999)	Kerrera (IRE) (1986)	Rimosa's Pet (GB) (1976)	Rimoso (GB) (1960) (family: 3-n)
