= Godolphin Mile =

- Class: Group 2
- Location: Meydan Racecourse; Dubai, United Arab Emirates
- Inaugurated: 1994
- Race type: Thoroughbred – Flat racing

Race information
- Distance: 1,600 metres (8 furlongs)
- Surface: Dirt
- Qualification: Southern Hemisphere 3-year-olds & Northern Hemisphere 4-year-olds
- Weight: SH 3yo: 55 kg – NH 4yo: 57 kg. Allowance fillies & mares 2kg
- Purse: US$1,000,000

The Godolphin Mile is a Group 2 flat Thoroughbred horse race in the United Arab Emirates for Southern Hemisphere three-year-old horses and Northern Hemisphere four-year-olds. It is contested on dirt over a distance of 1,600 metres (approximately 8 furlongs) at Meydan Racecourse in Dubai.

Inaugurated in 1994 as the Nad Al Sheba Mile, and originally run at Nad Al Sheba Racecourse. It was renamed in 2000 to its current name, and was moved to Meydan Racecourse in 2010. The race takes place annually during the Dubai World Cup Night in late March and currently offers a purse of US$1 million.

== Records ==
Speed record:

- 1:35:21 – One Man Band (2016) at Meydan Racecourse on Dirt
- 1:36:57 – Calming Influence (2010) at Meydan Racecourse on Tapeta
- 1:34.91 – Lend a Hand (1999) at Nad Al Sheba Racecourse

Most wins:

- 2 – Lost Soldier (1994, 1995)
- 2 – Firebreak (2003, 2004)

Most wins by a jockey:

- 8 – Frankie Dettori (1998, 1999, 2003, 2004, 2009, 2011, 2012, 2025)

Most wins by a trainer:

- 10 – Saeed bin Suroor (1996, 1997, 1998, 1999, 2001, 2003, 2004, 2009, 2011, 2012)

Most wins by an owner:

- 8 – Godolphin Racing (1998, 2001, 2003, 2004, 2009, 2010, 2011, 2012)

== Winners of the Godolphin Mile ==
Year	Winner	Age	Jockey	Trainer	Owner	Time
1994	Lost Soldier	4	Anthony McGlone	Kiaran McLaughlin	Mohammed Obaid Al Maktoum	1:40.90
1995	Lost Soldier	5	Gary Hind	Kiaran McLaughlin	Mohammed Obaid Al Maktoum	1:41.40
1996	Tereshkova	4	Olivier Peslier	Saeed bin Suroor	Hamdan Al Maktoum	1:38.53
1997	Kassbaan	7	Jerry Bailey	Saeed bin Suroor	Sheikh Mohammed	1:36.48
1998	Allied Forces	5	Frankie Dettori	Saeed bin Suroor	Godolphin Racing	1:39.10
1999	Lend A Hand	4	Frankie Dettori	Saeed bin Suroor	Rashid bin Mohammed Al Maktoum	1:34.91
2000	Conflict	4	Ted Durcan	Nick Robb	Marwan Al Maktoum	1:36.40
2001	Festival of Light	4	David Flores	Saeed bin Suroor	Godolphin Racing	1:35.42
2002	Grey Memo	5	Gary Stevens	Warren Stute	R. Manzani et al.	1:36.69
2003	Firebreak	4	Frankie Dettori	Saeed bin Suroor	Godolphin Racing	1:36.20
2004	Firebreak	5	Frankie Dettori	Saeed bin Suroor	Godolphin Racing	1:35.82
2005	Grand Emporium	5	Weichong Marwing	Mike de Kock	Maktoum Al Maktoum	1:37.78
2006	Utopia	6	Yutaka Take	Kojiro Hashiguchi	Makoto Kaneko	1:35.88
2007	Spring at Last	4	Garrett Gomez	Douglas F. O'Neill	Reddam & WinStar	1:36.16
2008	Diamond Stripes	5	Edgar Prado	Richard E. Dutrow Jr.	Four Roses Thoroughbreds	1:36.96
2009	Two Step Salsa	4	Frankie Dettori	Saeed bin Suroor	Godolphin Racing	1:36.82
2010	Calming Influence	5	Ahmad Ajtebi	Mahmoud Al Zarooni	Godolphin Racing	1:36.57
2011	Skysurfers	5	Frankie Dettori	Saeed bin Suroor	Godolphin Racing	1:37.65
2012	African Story	5	Frankie Dettori	Saeed bin Suroor	Godolphin Racing	1:37.52
2013	Soft Falling Rain	4	Paul Hanagan	Mike de Kock	Hamdan Al Maktoum	1:39.97
2014	Variety Club	6	Anton Marcus	Joey Ramsden	I & M Jooste	1:37.28
2015	Tamarkuz	5	Paul Hanagan	Musabah Al Muhairi	Hamdan Al Maktoum	1:36.81
2016	One Man Band	5	Sam Hitchcott	Doug Watson	Saeed bin Mohammed Al Maktoum	1:35.21
2017	Second Summer	5	Pat Dobbs	Doug Watson	Rashid bin Humaid Al Nuaimi	1:35.82
2018	Heavy Metal	8	Ryan Moore	Salem bin Ghadayer	Hamdan bin Mohammed Al Maktoum	1:36.22
2019	Coal Front	5	José Ortiz	Todd Pletcher	Robert V. LaPenta & Head Of Plains Partners	1:36.51
2020	Cancelled due to the COVID-19 pandemic.					
2021	Secret Ambition	8	Tadhg O'Shea	Satish Seemar	Nasir Askar	1:35.36
2022	Bathrat Leon	4	Ryusei Sakai	Yoshito Yahagi	Hiroo Race Co Ltd	1:36.03
2023	Isolate	5	Tyler Gaffalione	Doug Watson	RRR Racing	1:35.71
2024	Two Rivers Over	4	Edwin Maldonado	Douglas F. O'Neill	Todd Cady & Ty Leatherman	1:37.49
2025	Raging Torrent	4	Frankie Dettori	Douglas F. O'Neill	Zhang Yuesheng and Great Friends Stables	1:36.70
2026	Banishing	6	Silvestre de Sousa	David Jacobson	Sharaf Mohammed Al Hariri / David Jacobson & Lawrence Roman	1:38.23

== See also ==
- List of United Arab Emirates horse races
