= Burj Nahaar =

Horse race in Dubai

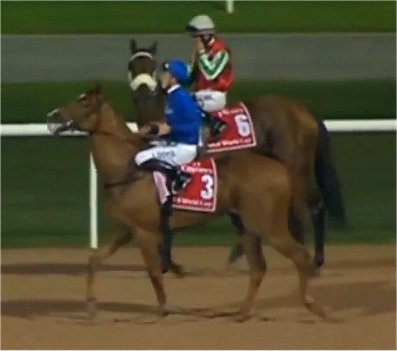
- African Story, who won the race twice
- Class: Group 3
- Location: Meydan Racecourse; Dubai, United Arab Emirates
- Inaugurated: 2002
- Race type: Thoroughbred - Flat racing

Race information
- Distance: 1,600 metres
- Surface: Dirt
- Track: Left-handed
- Qualification: 4-y-o+
- Purse: $350,000

The Burj Nahaar, is a one mile (1600 meter) horse race that takes place on a dirt track in at Meydan Racecourse in Dubai in March. The race is named after the Burj Nahar, a fortified tower on Dubai's old city walls.

The Burj Nahaar first took place in 2002 at Nad Al Sheba Racecourse. It became a Listed race in 2005 and was elevated to Group 3 level a year later. The race was relocated to Meydan in 2010 where it was run on a synthetic Tapeta surface before reverting to dirt in 2015.

== Records ==
Record time:

- 1:34.99 - Muntazah 2019

Most successful horse (2 wins):

- 2 - African Story – 2012, 2013

Most wins by a jockey:

- 3 - Frankie Dettori – 2003, 2011, 2012
- 3 - Mickael Barzalona – 2013, 2014, 2017

Most wins by a trainer:

- 6 - Saeed bin Suroor 2003, 2008, 2011, 2012, 2013, 2014

Most wins by an owner:

- 4 - Hamdan Al Maktoum 2003, 2009, 2015, 2019
- 4 - Godolphin 2008, 2012, 2013, 2014

== Winners ==
Year	Winner	Age	Jockey	Trainer	Owner	Time
2002	Conflict	6	Ted Durcan	Nick Robb	Marwan Al Maktoum	1:36.89
2003	Imtiyaz	4	Frankie Dettori	Saeed bin Suroor	Hamdan Al Maktoum	1:37.43
2004	Cherry Pickings	7	Ryan Moore	Mazin Al Kurdi	Rashid bin Mohammed	1:36.64
2005	Jack Sullivan	4	Eddie Ahern	Gerard Butler	International Carnival Partnership	1:37.73
2006	Marbush	5	Johnny Murtagh	Dhruba Selvaratnam	Ahmed Al Maktoum	1:35.79
2007	Boston Lodge	7	Eddie Ahern	Doug Watson	Fawzi Abdulla Nass	1:35.86
2008	Elusive Warning	4	Kerrin McEvoy	Saeed bin Suroor	Godolphin	1:35.43
2009	Snaafy	5	Richard Hills	Musabah Al Muhairi	Hamdan Al Maktoum	1:37.00
2010	Cat Junior	5	Richard Hills	Brian Meehan	Roldvale Ltd & Gold Property Investments	1:35.95
2011	Mendip	4	Frankie Dettori	Saeed bin Suroor	Hamdan bin Mohammed Al Maktoum	1:36.77
2012	African Story	5	Frankie Dettori	Saeed bin Suroor	Godolphin	1:35.93
2013	African Story	6	Mickael Barzalona	Saeed bin Suroor	Godolphin	1:36.89
2014	Shuruq	4	Mickael Barzalona	Saeed bin Suroor	Godolphin	1:36.36
2015	Tamarkuz	5	Paul Hanagan	Musabah Al Muhairi	Hamdan Al Maktoum	1:37.38
2016	Cool Cowboy	5	Pat Dobbs	Doug Watson	Zaur Sekrekov	1:36.43
2017	Heavy Metal	7	Mickael Barzalona	Salem bin Ghadayer	Hamdan bin Mohammed Al Maktoum	1:37.19
2018	Kimbear	4	Pat Dobbs	Doug Watson	Rashid bin Humaid Al Nuaimi	1:36.81
2019	Muntazah	6	Jim Crowley	Doug Watson	Hamdan Al Maktoum	1:34.99
2020	Salute The Soldier	5	Adrie de Vries	Fawzi Abdulla Nass	Victorious	1:37.27
2021	Midnight Sands	5	Pat Dobbs	Doug Watson	Cool Silk Partnership	1:37.78
2022	Desert Wisdom	4	Adrie de Vries	Ahmed Al Shemaili	Hassan Saleh Al Hammadi	1:37.17
2023	Discovery Island	6	James Doyle	Bhupat Seemar	Mohammed Khaleel Ahmed	1:36.98
2024	Laurel River	6	Tadhg O'Shea	Bhupat Seemar	Juddmonte Farms, Inc	1:36.90
2025	Fort Payne	7	Dylan Browne McMonagle	N Caullery	Alain Jathiere	1:36.89

== See also ==
- List of United Arab Emirates horse races
