= Balanchine (horse race) =

- Class: Group Two
- Location: Meydan Racecourse; Dubai, United Arab Emirates
- Inaugurated: 2004
- Race type: Thoroughbred - Flat racing

Race information
- Distance: 1,800 metres
- Surface: Turf
- Track: Left-handed
- Qualification: 4yo+ fillies & mares, 3yo+ fillies & mares (southern hemisphere)
- Purse: $200,000

The Balanchine (sometimes known as the Balanchine Stakes), is a horse race run over a distance of 1,800 metres (nine furlongs) on turf in February or March at Meydan Racecourse in Dubai. The race is named after Balanchine, a horse who won The Oaks and the Irish Derby in 1994. The race is restricted to female racehorses aged at least four years old, although three-year-olds bred in the southern hemisphere are also qualified.

It was first contested in 2004 at Nad Al Sheba Racecourse before being transferred to Meydan in 2010.

The Balanchine began as an ungraded race before being elevated to Listed class in 2006. The race was promoted to Group 3 level in 2009 and became a Group 2 event in 2011.

== Records ==
Record time:

- 1:47.64 - English Rose 2024

Most wins by a jockey:

- 4 - Christophe Soumillon 2010, 2011, 2012, 2015
- 4 - William Buick 2019, 2020, 2022, 2023

Most wins by a trainer:

- 6 - Charlie Appleby 2019, 2020, 2021, 2022, 2023, 2024

Most wins by an owner:

- 10 - Godolphin Racing 2004, 2013, 2016, 2018, 2019, 2020, 2021, 2022, 2023, 2024

== Winners ==
| Year | Winner | Age | Jockey | Trainer | Owner | Time |
|---|---|---|---|---|---|---|
| 2004 | Gonfilia | 4 | Frankie Dettori | Saeed bin Suroor | Godolphin | 1:48.70 |
| 2005 | Moon Dazzle | 4 | Johnny Geroudis | Mike de Kock | Bernard Kantor | 1:49:80 |
| 2006 | Iridescence | 4 | Weichong Marwing | Mike de Kock | Team Valor | 1:52.17 |
| 2007 | Royal Alchemist | 5 | Kerrin McEvoy | Ismail Mohammed | Hamdan bin Mohammed Al Maktoum | 1:49:13 |
| 2008 | Sun Classique | 4 | Kevin Shea | Mike de Kock | L Cohen & W V Rippon | 1:52:23 |
| 2009 | My Central | 5 | Johnny Murtagh | Herman Brown | Scuderia Siba | 1:51.09 |
| 2010 | Deem | 5 | Christophe Soumillon | Jerry Barton | Sultan Mohammed Saud Al Kabeer | 1:53.93 |
| 2011 | River Jetez | 7 | Christophe Soumillon | Mike de Kock | C A Amm & Marsh Shirtliff | 1:48.79 |
| 2012 | Mahbooba | 4 | Christophe Soumillon | Mike de Kock | Mohammed Bin Khalifa Al Maktoum | 1:50.27 |
| 2013 | Sajjhaa | 6 | Silvestre de Sousa | Saeed bin Suroor | Godolphin | 1:48.58 |
| 2014 | L'Amour de Ma Vie | 5 | Maxime Guyon | Pia Brandt | MD Bloodstock Limited | 1:50.55 |
| 2015 | Cladocera | 4 | Christophe Soumillon | Alain de Royer Dupre | Haras de la Perelle | 1:50.74 |
| 2016 | Very Special | 4 | James Doyle | Saeed bin Suroor | Godolphin | 1:48.85 |
| 2017 | Opal Tiara | 4 | Oisin Murphy | Mick Channon | Filly Folly & Sweet Partnership | 1:49.72 |
| 2018 | Promising Run | 5 | Pat Cosgrave | Saeed bin Suroor | Godolphin | 1:49.79 |
| 2019 | Poetic Charm | 4 | William Buick | Charlie Appleby | Godolphin | 1:49.60 |
| 2020 | Magic Lily | 5 | William Buick | Charlie Appleby | Godolphin | 1:47.65 |
| 2021 | Summer Romance | 4 | James Doyle | Charlie Appleby | Godolphin | 1:48.47 |
| 2022 | Creative Flair | 4 | William Buick | Charlie Appleby | Godolphin | 1:47.99 |
| 2023 | With The Moonlight | 4 | William Buick | Charlie Appleby | Godolphin | 1:49.47 |
| 2024 | English Rose | 4 | Mickael Barzalona | Charlie Appleby | Godolphin | 1:47:64 |
| 2025 | Choisya | 5 | Mickael Barzalona | Simon & Ed Crisford | Mohammed Al Nabouda | 1:48.78 |
| 2026 | Fairy Glen | 5 | Mickael Barzalona | Simon & Ed Crisford | Sheikh Hamdan bin Mohammed Al Maktoum | 1:49.89 |

== See also ==
- List of United Arab Emirates horse races
