= Jebel Ali Mile =

- Class: Group 3
- Location: Jebel Ali Racecourse; Dubai, United Arab Emirates
- Inaugurated: 2010
- Race type: Thoroughbred - Flat racing

Race information
- Distance: 1,600 metres
- Surface: Dirt
- Track: Right-handed
- Qualification: 4-y-o+
- Purse: $575,000

The Jebel Ali Mile, is a horse race for horses aged four and over, run at a distance of 1,600 metres (one mile) on dirt in January at Jebel Ali Racecourse in Dubai.

The Jebel Ali Mile was first contested in 2010 as a Listed race before being elevated to Group 3 class in 2013.

== Records ==
Track Record time:

- 1:35.09 - COLMAR KID 10/1/2014

Most successful horse:

- 2 - Treble Jig 2012, 2013
- 2 - Forjatt 2014, 2017

Most wins by a jockey:

- 2 - Wayne Smith 2012, 2013
- 2 - James Doyle 2014, 2022
- 2 - Silvestre de Sousa 2015, 2025

Most wins by a trainer:

- 5 - Mussabeh Al Mheiri 2011, 2012, 2013, 2015, 2025

Most wins by an owner:

- 3 - Fathi Esaed Mohammed Egziama 2012, 2013, 2015

== Winners ==
Year	Winner	Age	Jockey	Trainer	Owner	Time
2010	Jet Express	7	Royston Ffrench	Ali Rashid Al Rayhi	Ahmed Al Falasi	1:37.84
2011	Snaafy	7	Richard Hills	Musabbeh Al Mheiri	Hamdan Al Maktoum	1:38.01
2012	Treble Jig	5	Wayne Smith	Musabbeh Al Mheiri	Fathi Esaed Mohammed Egziama	1:39.09
2013	Treble Jig	6	Wayne Smith	Musabbeh Al Mheiri	Fathi Esaed Mohammed Egziama	1:36.25
2014	Forjatt	6	James Doyle	Dhruba Selvaratnam	Ahmed Al Maktoum	1:37.00
2015	Silver Galaxy	4	Silvestre de Sousa	Musabbeh Al Mheiri	Fathi Esaed Mohammed Egziama	1:36.67
2016	Sefri	6	Paul Hanagan	Erwan Charpy	Hamdan Al Maktoum	1:38.06
2017	Forjatt	9	Chris Hayes	Dhruba Selvaratnam	Ahmed Al Maktoum	1:36.21
2018	Shamaal Nibras	9	Pat Dobbs	Doug Watson	EERC	1:37.97
2019	Secret Ambition	6	Richard Mullen	Satish Seemar	Nasir Askar	1:36.88
2021	Blown By Wind	5	Xavier Ziani	Salem bin Ghadayer	Hamdan bin Mohammed Al Maktoum	1:37.97
2022	Algiers	5	James Doyle	Simon & Ed Crisford	Rabbah Racing	1:37:10
2023	Fanaar	7	Dane O'Neill	Doug Watson	Shadwell	1:37:36
2024	Swing Vote	4	William Buick	Simon & Ed Crisford	Rabbah Racing	1:36:67
2025	Qareeb	7	Silvestre de Sousa	Musabbeh Al Mheiri	Abubaker Kadoura	1:36:66
2026 (dh)	David of Athens	4	James Doyle	Hamad Al Jehani	Wathnan Racing	1:37.37
2026 (dh)	Masmak	5	Bernardo Pinheiro	Salem bin Ghadayer	Hamdan bin Mohammed Al Maktoum	1:37.37

== See also ==
- List of United Arab Emirates horse races
