= Tamarkuz =

American Thoroughbred racehorse

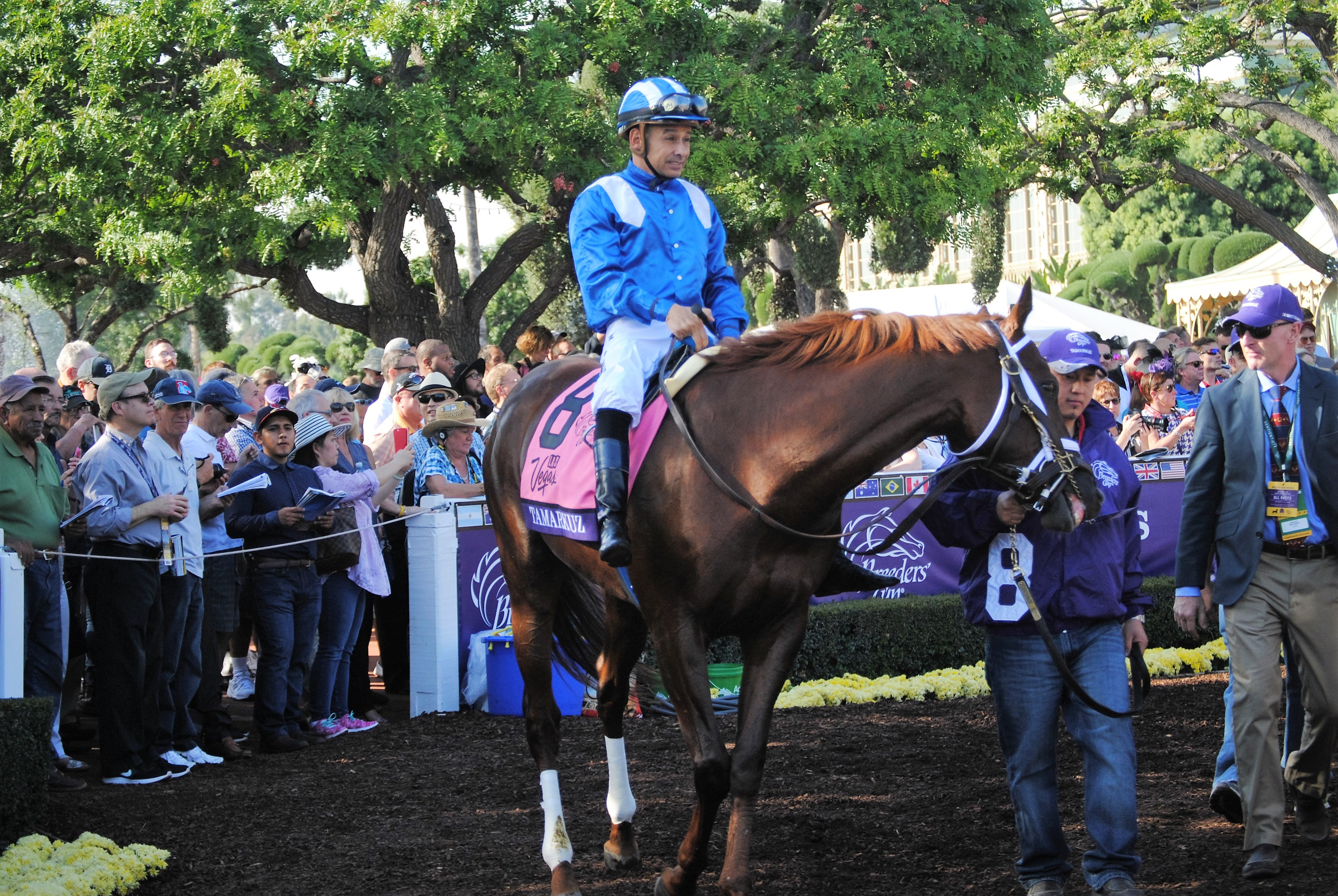
- Tamarkuz at the 2016 Breeders' Cup
- Sire: Speightstown
- Grandsire: Gone West
- Dam: Without You Babe
- Damsire: Lemon Drop Kid
- Sex: Stallion
- Foaled: 2010
- Country: United States
- Color: Chestnut
- Breeder: John D. Gunther
- Owner: Shadwell Stable
- Trainer: 1) Saeed bin Suroor (Europe); 2) Musabah Al Muhairi (Dubai); 3) Kiaran P. McLaughlin (USA)
- Jockey: Mike E. Smith
- Record: 20: 8-4-0
- Earnings: $1,840,444

Major wins
- Firebreak Stakes (2015); Godolphin Mile (2015); Burj Nahaar (2015) Breeders' Cup wins: Breeders' Cup Dirt Mile (2016)

Tamarkuz (foaled February 26, 2010) is a retired Thoroughbred racehorse best known for his 2016 win in the $1,000,000 Breeders' Cup Dirt Mile hosted that year by California's Santa Anita Park.

== Background ==
Tamarkuz is a chestnut Thoroughbred horse bred in Kentucky and purchased for $325,000 at the Keeneland September Sale in Lexington, Kentucky by the Shadwell Estate. He was sired by Speightstown, who also sired Hollywood Derby winner Seek Again and Belmont Derby winner Force the Pass, Alfred G. Vanderbilt Handicap, and Vosburgh Stakes winner Rock Fall, and Jockey Club Gold Cup Winner Haynesfield. His dam Without You Babe is by Lemon Drop Kid, winner of the Belmont Stakes and the Woodward Stakes, and who sired upset Kentucky Oaks winner Lemons Forever.

== European career ==
In Europe Tamarkuz was trained by Saeed bin Suroor where he ran only in Weight-for-Age and handicap races. During this time he was raced irregularly. In three years he only ran six times with a total of three wins.

== Dubai career ==
Tamarkuz made his racing debut under trainer Musabah Al Muhairi in 2014 at Meydan Racecourse in Dubai with a fifth-place finish. In his next start he failed to finish the race due to an injury that would take ten months to fully heal. He returned to racing in 2015 and won four of five starts including wins in the Firebreak Stakes and the Burj Nahaar. However, the highlight would be his nose victory over Sloane Avenue in the Godolphin Mile.

== American career ==
After success in Dubai, Tamarkuz went to America in 2015 where his race conditioning was handled by Kiaran McLaughlin. Tamarkuz began with a fourth-place finish in the Met Mile, then ran sixth in the Forego Stakes, and was fourth again in the Kelso Handicap. He returned to compete in America in 2016 and ran in the same three races as before. It started with a ninth in the Met Mile. In his next two races in the Forego and the Kelso, he was second. After that he entered the Breeders' Cup Dirt Mile. He went off at odds of 11-1 running against Champions such as Breeders' Cup Sprint winner Runhappy and Santa Anita Derby winner Dortmund. Ridden by U.S. Racing Hall of Fame jockey Mike Smith, at the start Tamarkuz was last. Quickly he was moved up to seventh and at the three quarters pole Gun Runner took the lead with Tamarkuz in third. Mike Smith then made his move with Tamarkuz, passing both Dortmund and Gun Runner to earn an upset win in the race.

Following his Breeders' Cup win Tamarkuz was retired to stand at stud at his owner's Shadwell Farm near Lexington, Kentucky.
