= Dubawi Stakes =

- Class: Group 3
- Location: Meydan Racecourse; Dubai, United Arab Emirates
- Inaugurated: 2014
- Race type: Thoroughbred - Flat racing

Race information
- Distance: 1,200 metres
- Surface: Dirt
- Track: Straight
- Qualification: 3-y-o+
- Purse: $200,000

The Dubawi Stakes, is a horse race run over a distance of 1,200 metres (six furlongs) on dirt in January at Meydan Racecourse in Dubai. The race is named after the successful racehorse and breeding stallion Dubawi.

The Dubawi Stakes was first contested in 2014 as a Listed race and was elevated to Group 3 level in 2018. The first running was contested on a synthetic Tapeta surface but was switched to dirt a year later.

== Records ==
Record time:

- 1:10.42 - Tuz 2024

Most successful horse (2 wins):

- 3 - Reynaldothewizard 2015, 2016, 2017

Most wins by a jockey:

- 4 - Richard Mullen 2015, 2016, 2017, 2019

Most wins by a trainer:

- 6 - Satish Seemar 2015, 2016, 2017, 2019, 2020, 2021

Most wins by an owner:

- 3 - Zabeel Racing International 2015, 2016, 2017

== Winners ==
Year	Winner	Age	Jockey	Trainer	Owner	Time
2014	United Color	5	James Doyle	Dhruba Selvaratnam	Ahmed Al Maktoum	1:11.75
2015	Reynaldothewizard	9	Richard Mullen	Satish Seemar	Zabeel Racing International	1:12.23
2016	Reynaldothewizard	10	Richard Mullen	Satish Seemar	Zabeel Racing International	1:10.97
2017	Reynaldothewizard	11	Richard Mullen	Satish Seemar	Zabeel Racing International	1:10.66
2018	Comicas	5	William Buick	Charlie Appleby	Godolphin	1:12.44
2019	Raven's Corner	6	Richard Mullen	Satish Seemar	Touch Gold Racing & Sean Ewing	1:11.68
2020	Gladiator King	4	Mickael Barzalona	Satish Seemar	Rashid bin Humaid Al Nuaimi	1:11.29
2021	Switzerland	7	Tadhg O'Shea	Satish Seemar	RRR Racing	1:10.86
2022	Al Tariq	6	Pat Dobbs	Doug Watson	Abdul Mohsen Al Abdul Kareem	1:11.75
2023	Switzerland	9	Tadhg O'Shea	Bhupat Seemar	RRR Racing	1:10.82
2024	Tuz	7	Tadhg O'Shea	Bhupat Seemar	Dakki Stable	1:10.42
2025	Tuz	8	Tadhg O'Shea	Bhupat Seemar	Dakki Stable	1:10.34
2026	El Nasseeb	5	Silvestre De Sousa	Musabbeh Al Mheiri	Mohd Abdulla Mohd Rashed Al Shehhi	1:11.54

== See also ==
- List of United Arab Emirates horse races
