= Cape Verdi (horse race) =

Horse race in Dubai, United Arab Emirates

- Class: Group Two
- Location: Meydan Racecourse; Dubai, United Arab Emirates
- Inaugurated: 2004
- Race type: Thoroughbred - Flat racing

Race information
- Distance: 1,600 metres
- Surface: Turf
- Track: Left-handed
- Qualification: 4yo+ fillies & mares, 3yo+ fillies & mares (southern hemisphere)
- Purse: $200,000

The Cape Verdi (sometimes known as the Cape Verdi Stakes), is a horse race run over a distance of 1,600 metres (one mile) on turf in late January or early February at Meydan Racecourse in Dubai. The race is named after Cape Verdi, a horse who won the 1000 Guineas for Godolphin in 1998. The race is restricted to female racehorses aged at least four years old, although three-year-olds bred in the southern hemisphere are also qualified.

It was first contested in 2004 at Nad Al Sheba Racecourse before being transferred to Meydan in 2010.

The Cape Verdi began as an ungraded race before being elevated to Listed class in 2006. The race was elevated to Group 3 level in 2009 and became a Group 2 event in 2011.

== Records ==
Record time:

- 1:34.84 - Magic Lily 2020

Most wins by a jockey:

- 4 - James Doyle 2016, 2019, 2020, 2021

Most wins by a trainer:

- 6 - Charlie Appleby 2014, 2019, 2020, 2021, 2023, 2024
- 6 - Saeed bin Suroor 2011, 2013, 2016, 2017, 2018, 2026

Most wins by an owner:

- 11 - Godolphin Racing 2011, 2013, 2014, 2016, 2017, 2018, 2019, 2020, 2021, 2023, 2024, 2026

== Winners ==
Year	Winner	Age	Jockey	Trainer	Owner	Time
2004	Festive Style	3	Ryan Moore	Satish Seemar	Fort Knox Syndicate	1:36.84
2005	Ribella	6	Halis Karatas	Haldun Gunes	S Selman Tasbek	1:37:30
2006	Clinet	4	Eddie Ahern	John Hills	Wood Hall Stud	1:37.48
2007	Sanaya	4	Christophe Soumillon	Alain de Royer Dupre	Aga Khan IV	1:38:56
2008	Sun Classique	4	Kevin Shea	Mike de Kock	L Cohen & W V Rippon	1:40:05
2009	Deem	4	Fernando Jara	Jerry Barton	Sultan Mohammed Saud Al Kabeer	1:38.97
2010	Soneva	4	Christophe Soumillon	Marco Botti	Arno Curty	1:38.40
2011	Aspectoflove	5	Frankie Dettori	Saeed bin Suroor	Godolphin	1:36.52
2012	First City	6	Royston Ffrench	Ali Rashid Al Raihe	Saeed Hamad Al Ahbabi	1:38.33
2013	Sajjhaa	6	Silvestre de Sousa	Saeed bin Suroor	Godolphin	1:36.68
2014	Certify	4	Mickael Barzalona	Charlie Appleby	Godolphin	1:36.09
2015	Cladocera	4	Christophe Soumillon	Alain de Royer Dupre	Haras de la Perelle	1:37.22
2016	Very Special	4	James Doyle	Saeed bin Suroor	Godolphin	1:37.88
2017	Very Special	5	Jim Crowley	Saeed bin Suroor	Godolphin	1:37.21
2018	Promising Run	5	Pat Cosgrave	Saeed bin Suroor	Godolphin	1:36.56
2019	Poetic Charm	4	James Doyle	Charlie Appleby	Godolphin	1:36.46
2020	Magic Lily	5	James Doyle	Charlie Appleby	Godolphin	1:34.84
2021	Althiqa	4	James Doyle	Charlie Appleby	Godolphin	1:35.08
2022	Pevensey Bay	6	Olivier Peslier	Hiroo Shimizu	Mme Julia & Jonathan Aisbitt	1:36:13
2023	With The Moonlight	4	William Buick	Charlie Appleby	Godolphin	1:34:92
2024	Silver Lady	4	Mickael Barzalona	Charlie Appleby	Godolphin	1:34:57
2025	Choisya	5	Mickael Barzalona	Simon & Ed Crisford	Mohammed Al Nabouda	1:40.97
2026	Dubai Beach	5	Kieran Shoemark	Saeed bin Suroor	Godolphin	1:35.67

== See also ==
- List of United Arab Emirates horse races
