= Abu Dhabi Championship =

- Class: Listed
- Location: Abu Dhabi Racecourse; Abu Dhabi, United Arab Emirates
- Inaugurated: 2005
- Race type: Thoroughbred - Flat racing

Race information
- Distance: 2,200 metres
- Surface: Turf
- Track: Right-handed
- Qualification: 4-y-o+
- Purse: $380,000

The Abu Dhabi Championship, is a horse race for horses aged four and over, run at a distance of 2,200 metres (eleven furlongs) on turf in March at Abu Dhabi Equestrian Club in Abu Dhabi.

The Abu Dhabi Championship was first contested in 2004 and became a Listed race in 2005 before being elevated to Group 3 class in 2011. The race reverted to Listed race again in 2022.

== Records ==
Record time:

- 2:12.70 - Jamr 2014

Most successful horse:

- 2 - GM Hopkins 2019, 2020

Most wins by a jockey:

- 3 - Pat Cosgrave 2011, 2019, 2020
- 3 - Richard Hills 2005, 2007, 2010

Most wins by a trainer:

- 3 - Dhruba Selvaratnam 2006, 2008, 2015
- 3 - Ali Rashid Al Rayhi 2010, 2012, 2016
- 3 - Erwan Charpy 2004, 2007, 2017

Most wins by an owner:

- 5 - Hamdan Al Maktoum 2005, 2007, 2010, 2016, 2017

== Winners ==
Year	Winner	Age	Jockey	Trainer	Owner	Time
2004	Bowman	5	Seamus O'Gorman	Erwan Charpy	Hamdan bin Mohammed Al Maktoum	2:15.30
2005	Mutasallil	5	Richard Hills	Doug Watson	Hamdan Al Maktoum	2:17.69
2006	Morshdi	8	Daragh O'Donohoe	Dhruba Selvaratnam	Ahmed Al Maktoum	2:13.60
2007	Great Plains	5	Richard Hills	Erwan Charpy	Hamdan Al Maktoum	2:15.89
2008	Mulaqat	5	Johnny Murtagh	Dhruba Selvaratnam	Ahmed Al Maktoum	2:16.67
2009	Mr Brock	5	Kevin Shea	Mike de Kock	Mme Serge Seenyen	2:15.73
2010	Monte Alto	6	Richard Hills	Ali Rashid Al Rayhi	Hamdan Al Maktoum	2:15.12
2011	Topclas	5	Pat Cosgrave	Mubarak bin Shafya	Hamdan bin Mohammed Al Maktoum	2:14.01
2012	Al Shemali	8	Silvestre de Sousa	Ali Rashid Al Rayhi	Hamdan bin Mohammed Al Maktoum	2:15.36
2013	Jutland	6	Pat Dobbs	Doug Watson	Hamdan bin Mohammed Al Maktoum	2:16.94
2014	Jamr	6	Adrie de Vries	Ahmed bin Harmash	Mansoor bin Mohammed al Maktoum	2:12.70
2015	Dormello	7	Oisin Murphy	Dhruba Selvaratnam	Ahmed Al Maktoum	2:13.50
2016	Khusoosy	4	Paul Hanagan	Ali Rashid Al Rayhi	Hamdan Al Maktoum	2:16.30
2017	Zamaam	7	Jim Crowley	Erwan Charpy	Hamdan Al Maktoum	2:14.28
2018	Light the Lights	6	Adrie de Vries	Mike de Kock	Mohammed bin Khalifa Al Maktoum	2:14.06
2019	GM Hopkins	8	Pat Cosgrave	Jaber Ramadhan	Ramadhan Stable	2:19.30
2020	GM Hopkins	9	Pat Cosgrave	Jaber Ramadhan	Ramadhan Stable	2:14.15
2021	Irish Freedom	7	Antonio Fresu	Satish Seemar	JW, J & MJ Moraes	2:17.44
2022	Law Of Peace	5	Antonio Fresu	Bhupat Seemar	Nasir Askar	2:15.75
2024	Vagalame	5	Xavier Ziani	Salem bin Ghadayer	Sheik Hamdan bin Mohammed Al Maktoum	2:15.70
2025	Stormy Ocean	6	Sam Hitchcott	A bin Harmash	Abdullah Menahi	2:14.27
2026	Royal Power	5	William Buick	Charlie Appleby	Godolphin	2:30.00

== See also ==
- List of United Arab Emirates horse races
