= African Story =

British-bred Thoroughbred racehorse

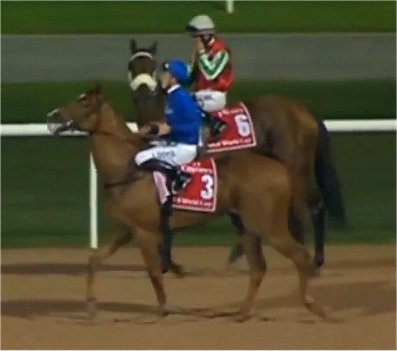
- African Story (3) at the 2015 Dubai World Cup.
- Sire: Pivotal
- Grandsire: Polar Falcon
- Dam: Blixen
- Damsire: Gone West
- Sex: Gelding
- Foaled: 10 March 2007
- Country: United Kingdom
- Colour: Chestnut
- Breeder: Darley Stud
- Owner: Sheikh Mohammed; Godolphin Racing
- Trainer: André Fabre; Saeed bin Suroor
- Record: 21:8-4-3
- Earnings: £4,796,932

Major wins
- Burj Nahaar (2012, 2013); Godolphin Mile (2012); Dubai World Cup (2014); Al Maktoum Challenge, Round 3 (2015)

African Story (foaled 10 March 2007) is a British-bred Thoroughbred racehorse. Originally trained in France, he showed promise when racing on turf by winning twice and being placed in several important races before being transferred to race on Tapeta in Dubai in 2012. He won the Godolphin Mile in 2012 and the Burj Nahaar in both 2012 and 2013 before recording his most important success in the 2014 Dubai World Cup.

== Background ==
African Story is a chestnut gelding with a narrow white blaze bred in the United Kingdom by Sheikh Mohammed's Darley Stud. His sire Pivotal was a top class sprinter who won the King's Stand Stakes and the Nunthorpe Stakes in 1996. He went on to become an "excellent" sire, getting the winners of more than a thousand races across a range of distances including Farhh, Sariska, Somnus, Kyllachy and Excellent Art. African Story's dam, Blixen, won one minor race at the Curragh Racecourse in 2000, and was a great-granddaughter of the broodmare Mesopatamia, making her a distant relative of Halling and Mastery. African Story was sent into training with André Fabre in France.

== Racing career ==
=== 2010–2011: early career ===
African Story was unraced as a two-year-old and did not race until the late autumn of his three-year-old season. He made his racecourse debut in the Prix Borax over 1600 metres at Saint-Cloud Racecourse on 9 November 2010 and won by two and a half lengths from seven opponents. Two weeks later at the same course and distance he started favourite for the Prix Sourbier and finished second to Round Midnight.

African Story began his four-year-old season by winning the Prix d'Ailly over 1500 metres on the synthetic Fibresand course at Deauville Racecourse on 10 March. He then finished second at Longchamp in April and third in a race for amateur riders at Chantilly in May before being moved up in class for the Group Three Prix du Palais-Royal in June in which he finished fourth behind Sahpresa, Moonlight Cloud and Evaporation. In the Prix de la Porte Maillot over 1400 metres at Longchamp in July he produced a strong finish but failed by a head to catch Moonlight Cloud. On his final start for Fabre he finished third behind Zinabaa in the Prix Quincey at Deauville on 28 August.

=== 2012: five-year-old season ===
At the end of the 2011 season, African Story was transferred to Dubai where he was trained by Saeed bin Suroor. Racing in the colours of Sheikh Mohammed's Godolphin team, he made his debut for his new trainer on 26 January 2012 when he won a handicap race over 1400 metres on the Tapeta surface at Meydan Racecourse. After finishing third in his next race, he started at odds of 5/1 for the Group Three Burj Nahaar over 1600 metres on 10 March. Ridden by Frankie Dettori, he took the lead in the straight and won "comfortably" by four lengths from Snaafy with the odds-on favourite Musir in third. Three weeks later on Dubai World Cup night, he started the 5/6 favourite for the Group 2 Godolphin Mile and won by four lengths from the South-African challenger Viscount Nelson. Dettori described the performance as a "push-button result" while Saeed bin Suroor said that "there are lots of options open to him and he is likely to come back to England". On his final appearance as a five-year-old, African Story was sent to Hong Kong in May to contest the Champions Mile at Sha Tin Racecourse, finishing sixth of the ten runners behind Xtension.

=== 2013: six-year-old season ===
On his six-year-old debut, African Story repeated his 2012 success in the Burj Nahaar. Ridden by Mickael Barzalona he started the 11/4 favourite and won by two and a quarter lengths from Capital Attraction. He was strongly fancied for the 2013 Dubai World Cup and started the 8/1 fourth choice in the betting behind Hunter's Light, Royal Delta and Animal Kingdom. Ridden again by Barzalona he made progress in the straight without ever looking likely to win and finished fifth of the twelve runners, seven lengths behind the winner Animal Kingdom.

=== 2014: seven-year-old season ===
In early 2014, African Story contested two rounds of the Al Maktoum Challenge at Meydan. He finished second behind Prince Bishop in the second round on 6 February and then finished eighth behind the same horse when favourite for the third round on 8 March. On 29 March African Story contested the Dubai World Cup for the second time. Ridden by Silvestre de Sousa he started at odds of 12/1 in a field of sixteen which included Ruler of the World from Ireland, Military Attack and Akeed Mofeed from Hong Kong, and the multiple American Grade I winner Ron The Greek as well as runners from Britain, Japan and South Africa. African Story was settled just behind the leaders before overtaking the British five-year-old Mukhadram early in the straight and winning by two and a half lengths. His winning time of 2:01.61 was a new track record. After the race de Sousa said: "It's an amazing feeling and he just proved he's the best. He was very unlucky here last time when he banged his head in the stalls, but he has proved he's the boy".

=== 2015: eight-year-old season ===
After a ten-month absence, African Story returned in the second round of the Al Maktoum Challenge at Meydan. Since his previous run the track had been converted from the synthetic Tapeta surface to dirt. He started the 9/4 favourite but never looked likely to win and finished seventh of the eleven runner behind Frankyfourfingers. In the third round of the Al Maktoum Challenge started 11/2 third choice in the betting behind Prince Bishop and Frankyfourfingers. Ridden by James Doyle, he tracked the leaders before moving to the front inside the final furlong and holding off the late challenge of Prince Bishop to win by a neck. On his final racecourse appearance the gelding attempted to repeat his 2014 success in the Dubai World Cup but finished sixth of the nine runners behind Prince Bishop.

On 23 April it was announced that African Story would be retired from racing. Prince Bishop was retired on the same day and Saeed bin Suroor paid tribute to the pair saying "They were very tough and reliable racehorses... they could adapt quickly to their environment no matter where in the world they were taken to race."

== Pedigree ==
Pedigree of African Story (GB), chestnut gelding, 2007
Sire Pivotal (GB) 1993	Polar Falcon (USA); 1987	Nureyev	Northern Dancer
Sire Pivotal (GB) 1993	Polar Falcon (USA); 1987	Nureyev	Special
Sire Pivotal (GB) 1993	Polar Falcon (USA); 1987	Marie d'Argonne	Jefferson
Sire Pivotal (GB) 1993	Polar Falcon (USA); 1987	Marie d'Argonne	Mohair
Sire Pivotal (GB) 1993	Fearless Revival (GB); 1987	Cozzene	Caro
Sire Pivotal (GB) 1993	Fearless Revival (GB); 1987	Cozzene	Ride The Trails
Sire Pivotal (GB) 1993	Fearless Revival (GB); 1987	Stufida	Bustino
Sire Pivotal (GB) 1993	Fearless Revival (GB); 1987	Stufida	Zerbinetta
Dam Blixen (USA) 1998	Gone West (USA); 1984	Mr. Prospector	Raise a Native
Dam Blixen (USA) 1998	Gone West (USA); 1984	Mr. Prospector	Gold Digger
Dam Blixen (USA) 1998	Gone West (USA); 1984	Secrettame	Secretariat
Dam Blixen (USA) 1998	Gone West (USA); 1984	Secrettame	Tamerett
Dam Blixen (USA) 1998	Danish (IRE); 1991	Danehill	Danzig
Dam Blixen (USA) 1998	Danish (IRE); 1991	Danehill	Razyana
Dam Blixen (USA) 1998	Danish (IRE); 1991	Tea House	Sassafras
Dam Blixen (USA) 1998	Danish (IRE); 1991	Tea House	House Tie (Family: 10-c)

- African Story's half brother, African Gold, won the 2022 Kyōto Kinen.
