= Dubai Kahayla Classic =

Kahayla Classic
- Class: Grade I
- Location: Meydan; Dubai, United Arab Emirates
- Inaugurated: 1997
- Race type: Arabian
- Website: www.dubairacingclub.com

Race information
- Distance: 1 1/4 miles (10 furlongs; 2 km)
- Record: 2:11.87, Deryan (2021)
- Surface: Dirt
- Track: Left-handed
- Qualification: 5-year-old+
- Weight: Colt/Gelding: 126 lbs (57.2 kg); Filly: 121 lb (55 kg)
- Purse: US $1 million

The Dubai Kahayla Classic is a Group 1 race for Purebred Arabians held on Dubai World Cup Night at Meydan Racecourse in Dubai. It carries a purse of US$1,000,000 and is held annually on the last Saturday in March.

The Dubai Kahayla Classic started life as the Mashreq Bank Handicap in 1996 before becoming the Dubai Arabian Classic conditions race in 1997. In 2000 the race became the Dubai Kahayla Classic. It became a Group 1 race in 1999 and was run on dirt at Nad Al Sheba Racecourse until 2010, when the first renewal of the race was run at the newly built Meydan Racecourse on the synthetic Tapeta surface.

Due to the COVID-19 pandemic, the 2020 Kahayla Classic was canceled.

== Winners ==
Year	Horse	Trainer	Jockey	Owner	Time
2026	Falaah (FR)	Al Moatasem Al Balushi	Ahmed Al Balushi	HH Sayyid Shihab bin Harib bin Thuwaini Al Said	2:17.32
2025	First Classs (US)	Doug Watson	Connor Beasely	Deborah Mihaloff	2:12.65
2024	Tilal Al Khalediah (KSA)	Nasser Mutlaq Alkahtani	Adel Al Furiydi	Al Khalediah Stables	2:13.87
2023	Hayyan (FR)	M Al Jahoori	Oscar Chavez	Yas Horse Racing Management	2:14.15
2022	First Classs (US)	A de Mieulle	Ronnan Thomas	Nayef Saad Sh S Al Kaabi	2:14:24
2021	Deryan (FR)	D Guillemin	Ioritz Mendizabal	Yas Horse Racing Management	2:11.87
2020	NO RACE				
2019	Af Maher (AE)	E Oertel	Tadhg O'Shea	Khalid Khalifa Al Nabooda	2:15.67
2018	Tallaab Al Khalediah (SA)	M Mutlaq	Perez Roberto	Al Khalediah Stables	2:13.71
2017	Reda (QA)	J Smart	Harry Bentley	Sh Mohd Bin Khalifa Al Thani	2:16.10
2016	Af Mathmoon (AE)	M AlMheiri	Dane O'Neill	Sh Hamdan Bin Rashid Al Maktoum	2:15.47
2015	Manark (FR)	E Charpy	Dane O'Neill	Sh Hamdan Bin Rashid Al Maktoum	2:16.35
2014	Rabbah De Carrère (FR)	M Al Jahouri	Oliver Peslier	Sh Mansour bin Zayad al Nayan	2:17:76
2013	Al Mamun Monlau (FR)	JF Bernard	Christophe Soumillon	Sh Joaan bin Hamad Al Thani	2:20.26
2012	TM Fred Texas (US)	R Martino	Adrie de Vries	Sh Joaan Bin Hamad Al Thani	2:17;17
2011	Seraphin Du Paon (FR)	P Barbe	Olivier Peslier	Sh Khalifa Bin Zayed Al Nahyan	2:18.07
2010	Jaafer (GB)	J Smart	Adrie de Vries	Sh Khalifa Bin Mohammed .K Al Thani	2:13.61
2009	Fryvolous (FR)	R Simpson	Daragh O'Donohoe	Sh Khalifa Bin Zayed Al Nahyan	2:16.25
2008	Mizzna (FR)	E Lemartinel	Tadhg O'Shea	Sh Mansour Bin Zayed Al Nahyan	2:14.30
2007	Madjani (FR)	G Duffield	Richard Hills	Sh Hamdan Bin Rashid Al Maktoum	2:14.72
2006	Madjani (FR)	G Duffield	Richard Hills	Sh Hamdan Bin Rashid Al Maktoum	2:16.29
2005	Madjani (FR)	G Duffield	Willie Supple	Sh Hamdan Bin Rashid Al Maktoum	2:16.22
2004	Kaolino (GB)	G Duffield	Richard Hills	Sh Hamdan Bin Rashid Al Maktoum	2:16.42
2003	Bopp Moon (GB)	K McLaughlin	Richard Hills	Sh Hamdan Bin Rashid Al Maktoum	2:15.78
2002	Nez D'Or (FR)	J Smart	Wayne Smith	HH The President	2:16.39
2001	Magic De Piboule (FR)	J Totain	Olivier Peslier	Sh Khalifa Bin Zayed Al Nahyan	2:15.07
2000	Nivour De Cardonne (FR)	K McLaughlin	John Carroll	Sh Hamdan Bin Rashid Al Maktoum	2:16.00
1999	Unchained Melody (US)	L Carter Jnr	Peter Brette	HH The President	2:14.77
1998	Unchained Melody (US)	L Carter Jnr	Peter Brette	HH The President	2:20.25
1997	Unchained Melody (US)	L Carter Jnr	Peter Brette	HH The President	2:13.34
1996	Vadeer (GB)	Ismael Mohammed	John Carrol	Sh Maktoum Bin Mohammed Al Maktoum	2:20.38

== Records ==
Speed record:

- Mile and a Quarter: 2:11.87 – Deryan (2021)

Most wins by a horse:

- 3 – Alanudd (US) Unchained Melody (1997, 1998, 1999)
- 3 – Madjani (FR) (2005, 2006, 2007)

Most wins by a jockey:

- 4 – Richard Hills (2003, 2004, 2006, 2007)

Most wins by a trainer:

- 4 – Gillian Duffield (2004, 2005, 2006, 2007)

Most wins by an owner:

- 8 – HH Shk Hamdan Bin Rashid Al Maktoum (2000, 2003, 2004, 2005, 2006, 2007, 2015, 2016)
