= Al Rashidiya (horse race) =

- Class: Group Two
- Location: Meydan Racecourse; Dubai, United Arab Emirates
- Inaugurated: 2003
- Race type: Thoroughbred - Flat racing

Race information
- Distance: 1,800 metres
- Surface: Turf
- Track: Left-handed
- Purse: $200,000

The Al Rashidiya, is a horse race run over a distance of 1,800 metres (nine furlongs) on turf in late January or early February at Meydan Racecourse in Dubai. The race is named after a locality in Eastern Dubai.

It was first run in 2002 Nad Al Sheba Racecourse. It was transferred to Meydan in 2010.

The race distance was 2000 metres for the first two runnings before being reduced to 1800 metres in 2004.

The race began as a Listed event in 2002. The race was elevated to Group 3 level in 2005 and became a Group 2 event in 2015.

== Records ==
Record time:

- 1:45.11 - Measured Time (2024)

Most wins by a jockey:

- 6 - Christophe Soumillon 2012, 2013, 2014, 2015, 2016, 2019

Most wins by a trainer:

- 8 - Mike de Kock 2004, 2005, 2009, 2012, 2013, 2014, 2015, 2016

Most wins by an owner:

- 12 - Godolphin 2003, 2010, 2017, 2018, 2019, 2020, 2021, 2022, 2023 (January), 2023 (December), 2024, 2025

== Winners ==
Year	Winner	Age	Jockey	Trainer	Owner	Time
2002	Musha Merr	4	Ted Durcan	Kiaran McLaughlin	Rashid bin Mohammed	2:04.94
2003	Naheef	4	Kerrin McEvoy	Saeed bin Suroor	Godolphin	2:03.80
2004	Right Approach	5	Kerrin McEvoy	Mike de Kock	B Kantor	1:47.65
2005	Wolf Whistle	6	Weichong Marwing	Mike de Kock	Sargent, Egan, Enderie, Fenner & Harris	1:50.41
2006	Linngari	4	Ryan Moore	Herman Brown	James Atkinson & Peter Walichnowski	1:51.27
2007	Formal Decree	4	Mick Kinane	Ismail Mohammed	Hamdan bin Mohammed Al Maktoum	1:50.34
2008	Lord Admiral	7	Mick Kinane	Charles O'Brien	Vincent O'Brien	1:49:34
2009	Silver Mist	4	Kevin Shea	Mike de Kock	Rashid bin Humaid Al Nuaimi	1:50.70
2010	Alexandros	5	Frankie Dettori	Saeed bin Suroor	Godolphin	1:51.74
2011	Presvis	7	Ryan Moore	Luca Cumani	Leonidas Marinopoulos	1:49.56
2012	Musir	5	Christophe Soumillon	Mike de Kock	Mohammed bin Khalifa Al Maktoum	1:54.00
2013	The Apache	5	Christophe Soumillon	Mike de Kock	Mohammed bin Khalifa Al Maktoum & Winston Chow	1:49.68
2014	Mujaarib	5	Christophe Soumillon	Mike de Kock	Hamdan Al Maktoum	1:48.36
2015	Vercingetorix	4	Christophe Soumillon	Mike de Kock	Mohammed bin Khalifa Al Maktoum	1:49.12
2016	Forries Waltz	4	Christophe Soumillon	Mike de Kock	Mohammed bin Khalifa Al Maktoum, Gerber & De Kock	1:47.85
2017	Promising Run	4	Jim Crowley	Saeed bin Suroor	Godolphin	1:49.43
2018	Benbatl	4	Oisin Murphy	Saeed bin Suroor	Godolphin	1:48.42
2019	Dream Castle	4	Christophe Soumillon	Saeed bin Suroor	Godolphin	1:48.24
2020	Barney Roy	6	William Buick	Charlie Appleby	Godolphin	1:47.41
2021	Zakouski	5	William Buick	Charlie Appleby	Godolphin	1:48.39
2022	Desert Fire	7	Hector Crouch	Saeed bin Suroor	Godolphin	1:46.16
2023 (Jan)	Valiant Prince	5	James Doyle	Charlie Appleby	Godolphin	1:46.92
2023 (Dec)	Measured Time	3	William Buick	Charlie Appleby	Godolphin	1:46.97
2024	Measured Time	4	William Buick	Charlie Appleby	Godolphin	1:45.11
2025	Opera Ballo	3	William Buick	Charlie Appleby	Godolphin	1:48.13

== See also ==
- List of United Arab Emirates horse races
