= African Gold =

Japanese Thoroughbred racehorse (foaled 2015)

African Gold; アフリカンゴールド
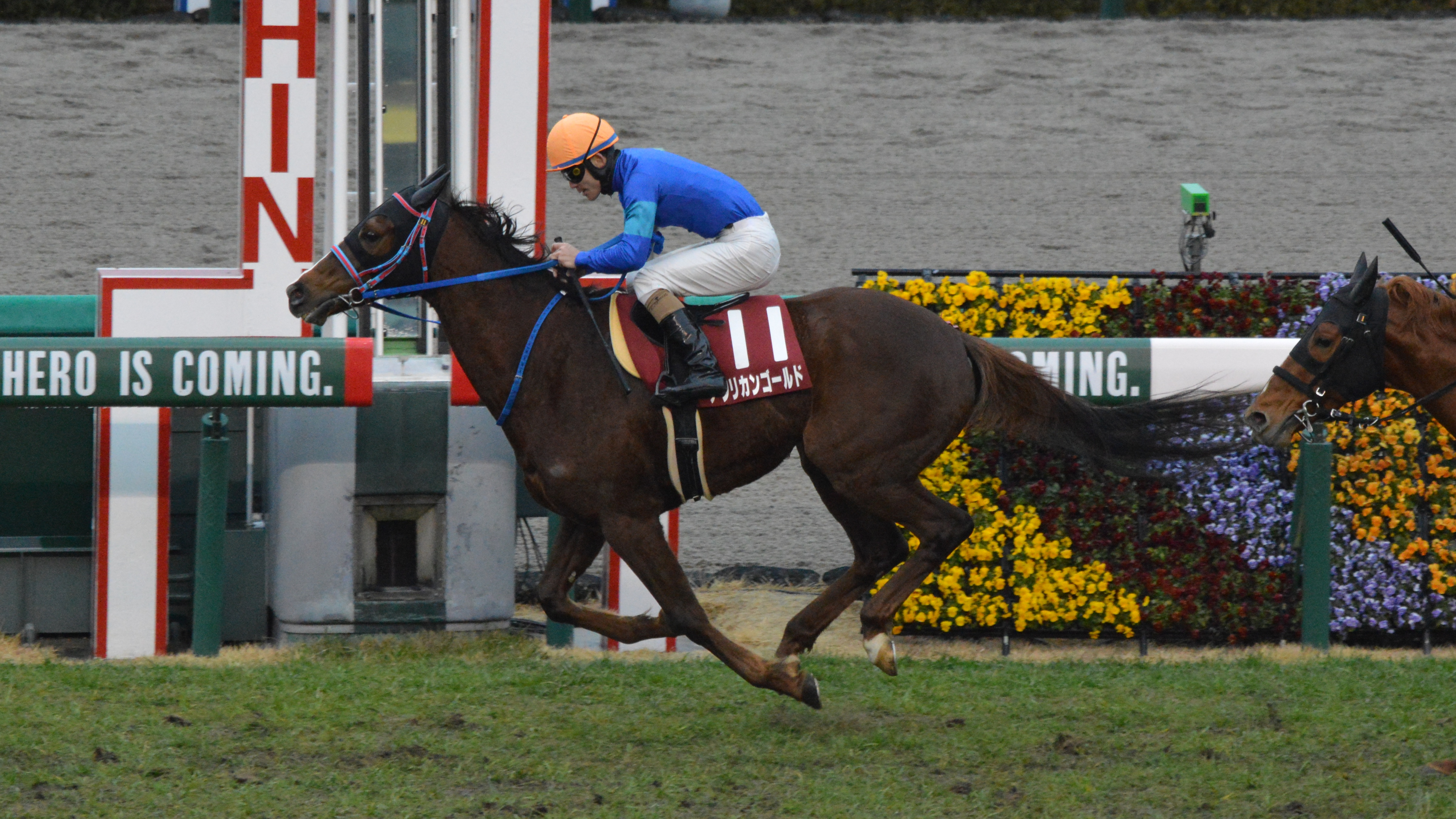
- African Gold at the 2022 Kyoto Kinen
- Breed: Thoroughbred
- Sire: Stay Gold
- Grandsire: Sunday Silence
- Dam: Blixen
- Damsire: Gone West
- Sex: Colt ->Gelding
- Foaled: 26 March 2015 (age 11)
- Country: Japan
- Colour: Chestnut
- Breeder: Darley Japan Farm
- Owner: Godolphin
- Racing colours
- Trainer: Masato Nishizono
- Jockey: Manabu Sakai; Fuma Matsuwaka; Filip Minařík; Yuga Kawada; Yuichi Fukunaga; Christophe Lemaire; Hironobu Tanabe; Kanichiro Fujii; Kota Fujioka; Kyosuke Kokubun; Tom Marquand
- Record: 40: 5-3-1
- Earnings: ¥186,648,000

Major wins
- Kyoto Kinen (2022)

African Gold (Japanese: アフリカンゴールド, Afurikan Gōrudo; foaled 26 March 2015) is a retired Japanese Thoroughbred racehorse. He recorded five wins from forty starts between 2017 and 2024, including the Kyoto Kinen (GII) in 2022.

== Background ==
African Gold is a chestnut gelding bred in Hidaka, Hokkaido, by Darley Japan Farm. He was sired by Stay Gold, and his dam was Blixen (USA), a mare by Gone West. His older half-brother African Story (by Pivotal) won the Dubai World Cup. He was owned by Godolphin and trained by Masato Nishizono at the JRA's Ritto Training Center.

== Racing career ==
=== 2017: two-year-old season ===
African Gold debuted on 23 December 2017 in a 2-year-old newcomer race over 2000 metres on turf at Hanshin Racecourse, finishing ninth.

=== 2018: three-year-old season ===
He ran twice in maiden races in early 2018 without winning, then won his third maiden attempt on 29 April at Kyoto Racecourse by a nose. After a second-place finish in the Melbourne Trophy, he won the Atsumi Tokubetsu on 22 July and the Hyogo Tokubetsu on 2 October. On 21 October, he made his graded stakes and Grade 1 debut in the Kikuka Shō at Kyoto, finishing 12th behind Fierement.

=== 2019: four-year-old season ===
He began the year on 13 January in the Nikkei Shinshun Hai (GII) at Kyoto, finishing 15th. After a fourth in the Midosuji Stakes and a second in the Karasuma Stakes, he was gelded due to his difficult temperament. He then finished fourth in the Malaysia Cup before winning the Rokusha Stakes at Tokyo on 6 October, his first win in a year. On 3 November, he finished third in the Copa Republica Argentina (GII) behind Muito Obrigado.

=== 2020: five-year-old season ===
He started the year on 19 January in the Nikkei Shinshun Hai, finishing 11th. He then finished tenth in the Metropolitan Stakes, 11th in the Meguro Kinen, and 18th in the Takarazuka Kinen (GI). He did not race again that year.

=== 2021: six-year-old season ===
He returned on 30 January in the Shirofuji Stakes (Listed) at Tokyo, finishing fourth. After unplaced runs in the Osakajo Stakes, Toohata Stakes, Naruo Kinen and Cepheus Stakes, he ran in the Chunichi Shimbun Hai (GIII) on 11 December. Starting 17th favourite of 18 runners, he finished second behind Shonan Bardi; the trifecta payout of 2,368,380 yen reflected the upset.

=== 2022: seven-year-old season ===
He began the year on 16 January with a fifth in the Nikkei Shinshun Hai. On 13 February, he contested the Kyoto Kinen (GII), run that year at Hanshin. Starting 12th favourite, he led from the start and held on to win by 0.2 seconds, recording his first graded stakes victory and giving jockey Kyosuke Kokubun his first graded win since 2018. He then finished seventh in the Osaka Hai (GI), 16th in the Takarazuka Kinen, 12th in the Kyoto Daishoten, and tenth in the Copa Republica Argentina.

=== 2023: eight-year-old season ===
He finished ninth in both the Nikkei Shinshun Hai and the Kyoto Kinen. On 19 March, he led in the Hanshin Daishoten (GII) and stuck on for fourth. On 30 April, he contested the Tennō Shō (Spring) (GI) at Kyoto. He took the early lead but suffered atrial fibrillation on the second backstretch and was pulled up. He returned on 20 August in the Sapporo Kinen, finishing 12th, then ran fifth in the Kyoto Daishoten, eighth in the Copa Republica Argentina, and 11th in the Stayers Stakes.

=== 2024: nine-year-old season ===
He began the year on 11 February in the Kyoto Kinen, finishing tenth. His retirement was announced by trainer Masato Nishizono on 24 February, and his JRA registration was cancelled on 29 February 2024. He was donated to the JRA and became a riding horse at Hanshin Racecourse, later serving as a lead pony at the same course.

== Race record ==
The following table details all 40 starts of African Gold's racing career based on official JBIS and netkeiba records. Record current as of his final start on 11 February 2024.

Date	Distance (Condition)	Race	Class	Course	Odds (Favourite)	Field	Finish	Time	Jockey	Winning (Losing) Margin	Winner (2nd Place)	Ref
2017 – two-year-old season
Dec 23	Turf 2000 m (Good)	2-Y-O Newcomer	Maiden	Hanshin	27.0 (7th)	12	9th	2:07.1	Manabu Sakai	1.0	Kitano Commandeur	
2018 – three-year-old season
Jan 20	Turf 2000 m (Yielding)	3-Y-O Maiden	Maiden	Kyoto	116.0 (11th)	15	4th	2:04.0	Fuma Matsuwaka	0.3	Jack Rose	
Feb 18	Turf 2000 m (Good)	3-Y-O Maiden	Maiden	Kyoto	16.4 (5th)	13	6th	2:03.2	Manabu Sakai	1.7	Neptunite	
Apr 29	Turf 2400 m (Good)	3-Y-O Maiden	Maiden	Kyoto	10.5 (5th)	11	1st	2:27.1	Fuma Matsuwaka	–0.0	(Meikei Gold)	
May 19	Turf 2200 m (Good)	Melbourne Trophy	1-win	Kyoto	7.1 (5th)	10	2nd	2:14.9	Fuma Matsuwaka	0.2	Drake	
Jul 22	Turf 2200 m (Good)	Atsumi Tokubetsu	1-win	Chukyo	6.5 (4th)	14	1st	2:11.9	Fuma Matsuwaka	–0.4	(Shadow Brillante)	
Oct 2	Turf 2400 m (Good)	Hyogo Tokubetsu	2-win	Hanshin	1.7 (1st)	8	1st	2:26.8	Fuma Matsuwaka	–0.7	(Aroma Dulce)	
Oct 21	Turf 3000 m (Good)	Kikuka Shō	GI	Kyoto	24.5 (9th)	18	12th	3:07.8	Fuma Matsuwaka	1.7	Fierement	
2019 – four-year-old season
Jan 13	Turf 2400 m (Good)	Nikkei Shinshun Hai	GII	Kyoto	7.5 (4th)	16	15th	2:29.3	Filip Minařík	3.1	Glory Vase	
Mar 31	Turf 2400 m (Good)	Midosuji Stakes	3-win	Hanshin	4.1 (3rd)	9	4th	2:26.2	Fuma Matsuwaka	0.1	Shirvanshah	
Apr 29	Turf 2400 m (Good)	Karasuma Stakes	3-win	Kyoto	3.2 (1st)	12	2nd	2:25.4	Fuma Matsuwaka	0.1	Renovar	
Jul 13	Turf 2000 m (Yielding)	Malaysia Cup	3-win	Chukyo	3.6 (2nd)	10	4th	2:00.9	Yuga Kawada	0.1	Kaval	
Oct 6	Turf 2400 m (Good)	Rokusha Stakes	3-win	Tokyo	3.9 (2nd)	15	1st	2:25.8	Yuichi Fukunaga	–0.2	(Trust Kenshin)	
Nov 3	Turf 2500 m (Good)	Copa Republica Argentina	GII	Tokyo	2.8 (1st)	13	3rd	2:31.7	Christophe Lemaire	0.2	Muito Obrigado	
2020 – five-year-old season
Jan 19	Turf 2400 m (Good)	Nikkei Shinshun Hai	GII	Kyoto	5.4 (3rd)	14	11th	2:28.1	Yuichi Fukunaga	1.2	Mozu Bello	
May 9	Turf 2400 m (Good)	Metropolitan Stakes	Listed	Tokyo	6.1 (4th)	11	10th	2:26.6	Yasunari Tanabe	0.8	Uranus Charm	
May 31	Turf 2500 m (Good)	Meguro Kinen	GII	Tokyo	28.6 (11th)	18	11th	2:30.3	Yuichi Fukunaga	0.7	King of Koji	
Jun 28	Turf 2200 m (Yielding)	Takarazuka Kinen	GI	Hanshin	413.5 (17th)	18	18th	2:21.8	Kanichiro Fujii	8.3	Chrono Genesis	
2021 – six-year-old season
Jan 30	Turf 2000 m (Good)	Shirofuji Stakes	Listed	Tokyo	63.3 (10th)	13	4th	1:59.2	Yasunari Tanabe	0.2	Potager	
Mar 7	Turf 1800 m (Good)	Osakajo Stakes	Listed	Hanshin	25.1 (10th)	16	10th	1:46.9	Kanichiro Fujii	0.8	Hindu Times	
May 15	Turf 2000 m (Good)	Toohata Stakes	Listed	Chukyo	7.5 (4th)	11	7th	2:00.0	Kota Fujioka	0.5	Mount Gold	
Jun 5	Turf 2000 m (Good)	Naruo Kinen	GIII	Chukyo	88.0 (11th)	13	10th	2:01.9	Kota Fujioka	1.2	Unicorn Lion	
Sep 18	Turf 2000 m (Heavy)	Cepheus Stakes	Open	Chukyo	50.4 (12th)	13	9th	2:01.9	Kota Fujioka	0.7	Arata	
Oct 17	Turf 2000 m (Yielding)	October Stakes	Listed	Tokyo	73.9 (16th)	18	8th	2:00.9	Kyosuke Kokubun	0.9	Panthalassa	
Dec 11	Turf 2000 m (Good)	Chunichi Shimbun Hai	GIII	Chukyo	154.0 (17th)	18	2nd	1:59.9	Kyosuke Kokubun	0.1	Shonan Bardi	
2022 – seven-year-old season
Jan 16	Turf 2200 m (Good)	Nikkei Shinshun Hai	GII	Chukyo	87.9 (12th)	16	5th	2:12.6	Kyosuke Kokubun	0.9	Yoho Lake	
Feb 13	Turf 2200 m (Yielding)	Kyoto Kinen	GII	Hanshin	51.5 (12th)	13	1st	2:11.9	Kyosuke Kokubun	–0.2	(Tagano Diamante)	
Apr 3	Turf 2000 m (Good)	Osaka Hai	GI	Hanshin	92.9 (11th)	16	7th	1:59.0	Kyosuke Kokubun	0.6	Potager	
Jun 26	Turf 2200 m (Good)	Takarazuka Kinen	GI	Hanshin	122.0 (12th)	17	16th	2:12.4	Kyosuke Kokubun	2.7	Titleholder	
Oct 10	Turf 2400 m (Yielding)	Kyoto Daishoten	GII	Hanshin	25.6 (12th)	14	12th	2:26.1	Kyosuke Kokubun	1.8	Vela Azul	
Nov 6	Turf 2500 m (Good)	Copa Republica Argentina	GII	Tokyo	46.8 (14th)	18	10th	2:31.9	Tom Marquand	0.8	Breakup	
2023 – eight-year-old season
Jan 15	Turf 2200 m (Yielding)	Nikkei Shinshun Hai	GII	Chukyo	70.8 (12th)	14	9th	2:15.0	Kyosuke Kokubun	0.8	Weltreisende	
Feb 12	Turf 2200 m (Good)	Kyoto Kinen	GII	Hanshin	111.2 (10th)	13	9th	2:12.3	Kyosuke Kokubun	1.4	Do Deuce	
Mar 19	Turf 3000 m (Good)	Hanshin Daishoten	GII	Hanshin	114.0 (10th)	14	4th	3:06.5	Kyosuke Kokubun	0.4	Justin Palace	
Apr 30	Turf 3200 m (Yielding)	Tennō Shō (Spring)	GI	Kyoto	213.8 (13th)	17	DNF	–	Kyosuke Kokubun	–	Justin Palace	
Aug 20	Turf 2000 m (Yielding)	Sapporo Kinen	GII	Sapporo	204.9 (13th)	15	12th	2:05.1	Kyosuke Kokubun	3.6	Prognosis	
Oct 9	Turf 2400 m (Heavy)	Kyoto Daishoten	GII	Kyoto	58.3 (10th)	14	5th	2:25.5	Kyosuke Kokubun	0.2	Pradaria	
Nov 5	Turf 2500 m (Good)	Copa Republica Argentina	GII	Tokyo	48.8 (12th)	18	8th	2:30.3	Kyosuke Kokubun	0.4	Zeffiro	
Dec 2	Turf 3600 m (Good)	Stayers Stakes	GII	Nakayama	16.3 (6th)	16	11th	3:47.7	Kyosuke Kokubun	2.3	Iron Barows	
2024 – nine-year-old season
Feb 11	Turf 2200 m (Good)	Kyoto Kinen	GII	Kyoto	46.0 (7th)	12	10th	2:13.2	Kyosuke Kokubun	1.1	Pradaria	

== In popular culture ==
In October 2018, a Twitter account was opened in the horse's own name, posting reports on his gelding, his next races and polls on his running style; he became known as "the horse that tweets". In the 2023 Idol Horse Audition run by the JRA's PR Center, he received 30,545 votes, placing first in the active horse division, and a plushie of him was produced.

== Pedigree ==
Pedigree of African Gold (JPN)
Sire Stay Gold (JPN) 1994	Sunday Silence (USA); 1986	Halo	Hail to Reason
Sire Stay Gold (JPN) 1994	Sunday Silence (USA); 1986	Halo	Cosmah
Sire Stay Gold (JPN) 1994	Sunday Silence (USA); 1986	Wishing Well	Understanding
Sire Stay Gold (JPN) 1994	Sunday Silence (USA); 1986	Wishing Well	Mountain Flower
Sire Stay Gold (JPN) 1994	Golden Sash (JPN); 1988	Dictus	Sanctus
Sire Stay Gold (JPN) 1994	Golden Sash (JPN); 1988	Dictus	Doronic
Sire Stay Gold (JPN) 1994	Golden Sash (JPN); 1988	Dyna Sash	Northern Taste
Sire Stay Gold (JPN) 1994	Golden Sash (JPN); 1988	Dyna Sash	Royal Sash
Dam Blixen (USA) 1998	Gone West (USA); 1984	Mr. Prospector	Raise a Native
Dam Blixen (USA) 1998	Gone West (USA); 1984	Mr. Prospector	Gold Digger
Dam Blixen (USA) 1998	Gone West (USA); 1984	Secrettame	Secretariat
Dam Blixen (USA) 1998	Gone West (USA); 1984	Secrettame	Tamerett
Dam Blixen (USA) 1998	Danish (USA); 1991	Danehill	Danzig
Dam Blixen (USA) 1998	Danish (USA); 1991	Danehill	Razyana
Dam Blixen (USA) 1998	Danish (USA); 1991	Tea House	Sassafras
Dam Blixen (USA) 1998	Danish (USA); 1991	Tea House	House Tie

- African Gold is inbred 5 × 5 to Northern Dancer.
- His older half-brother African Story won the Dubai World Cup.

== See also ==
- Thoroughbred racing in Japan
