= Dubai World Cup Night =

Annual horse races in Dubai

Dubai World Cup Night is a series of eight thoroughbred horse races and one Purebred Arabian race held annually at Meydan Racecourse in Dubai, United Arab Emirates. From 1996 through to 2009, the event was held at the Nad Al Sheba Racecourse.

Run under the auspices of the Emirates Racing Authority, the event currently offers purses totalling US$27.25 million and is the single richest day of Thoroughbred racing in the world. The Dubai World Cup Night includes the following races:

- Dubai Kahayla Classic GI (for purebred Arabians)
- Al Quoz Sprint GI
- Godolphin Mile GII
- Dubai Gold Cup GII
- UAE Derby GII
- Dubai Golden Shaheen GI (part of the Global Sprint Challenge since 2012)
- Dubai Turf GI (was part of the Asian Mile Challenge)
- Dubai Sheema Classic GI
- Dubai World Cup GI
