= Jebel Ali Racecourse =

Racecourse in Jebel Ali, Dubai, United Arab Emirates

- Interactive map of Jebel Ali Racecourse
- Location: Jebel Ali, Dubai
- Coordinates: 25°05′07″N 55°11′12″E
- Date opened: 1990
- Race type: Thoroughbred, Arab - Flat racing
- Course type: Dirt
- Notable races: Jebel Ali Mile

Jebel Ali Racecourse (in Arabic مضمار جبل علي) is a racecourse for flat racing in Jebel Ali, Emirate of Dubai, situated 35 kilometers south-west the city of Dubai.

== History ==
The racecourse was built in 1990 according to plans set down by Ahmed bin Rashid Al Maktoum and the trainer Dhruba Selvaratnam. The grandstand was expanded in 1995 and provides seating for more than 2000 spectators.

== Description ==
The racecourse is a 2200 metres right-handed horseshoe-shaped dirt track with a 900 metres straight. A chute enables sprint races of up to 1400 metres to be run over a straight course. The course features a steep uphill finish. The track surface is composed of sand and oil. Jebel Ali Racecourse has been described as "cramped and appealingly frayed at the edges" with "a particularly carefree atmosphere".

== Major races ==
=== Group 3 ===
Race Name	Dist. (m)	Surface	Age/Sex
Jebel Ali Mile	1,600	Dirt	4yo+

=== Listed races ===
Race Name	Dist. (m)	Surface	Age/Sex
Jebel Ali Stakes	1,950	Dirt	4yo+
Jebel Ali Sprint	1,000	Dirt	3yo+
