= Abu Dhabi Equestrian Club =

Riding club in Abu Dhabi, United Arab Emirates

- Interactive map of Abu Dhabi Equestrian Club
- Location: Abu Dhabi
- Coordinates: 24°26′25″N 54°22′40″E
- Date opened: 1990
- Race type: Thoroughbred, Arab - Flat racing
- Course type: Turf
- Notable races: Abu Dhabi Championship

Abu Dhabi Equestrian Club is a racecourse for flat racing located in Abu Dhabi.

== History ==
The President of Abu Dhabi, Zayed bin Sultan Al Nahyan founded a riding club in 1976 and had a grass track for private racing of Arab horses laid down in 1980. Public racing began in 1991 and the track was expanded and modernised three years later. In 2011 a new grandstand was opened, providing seating for 5000 spectators.

== Description ==
Abu Dhabi Equestrian Club has a 2000-metre right-handed grass track with a 400-metre straight. The course also has a synthetic fibresand training track.

== Major races ==
=== Group 3 ===
Race Name	Dist. (m)	Surface	Age/Sex
Abu Dhabi Championship	2,200	Turf	4yo+

=== Listed races ===
Race Name	Dist. (m)	Surface	Age/Sex
President Cup	1,400	Turf	4yo+
National Day Cup	1,600	Turf	3yo+
