= Silvestre de Sousa =

Brazilian jockey

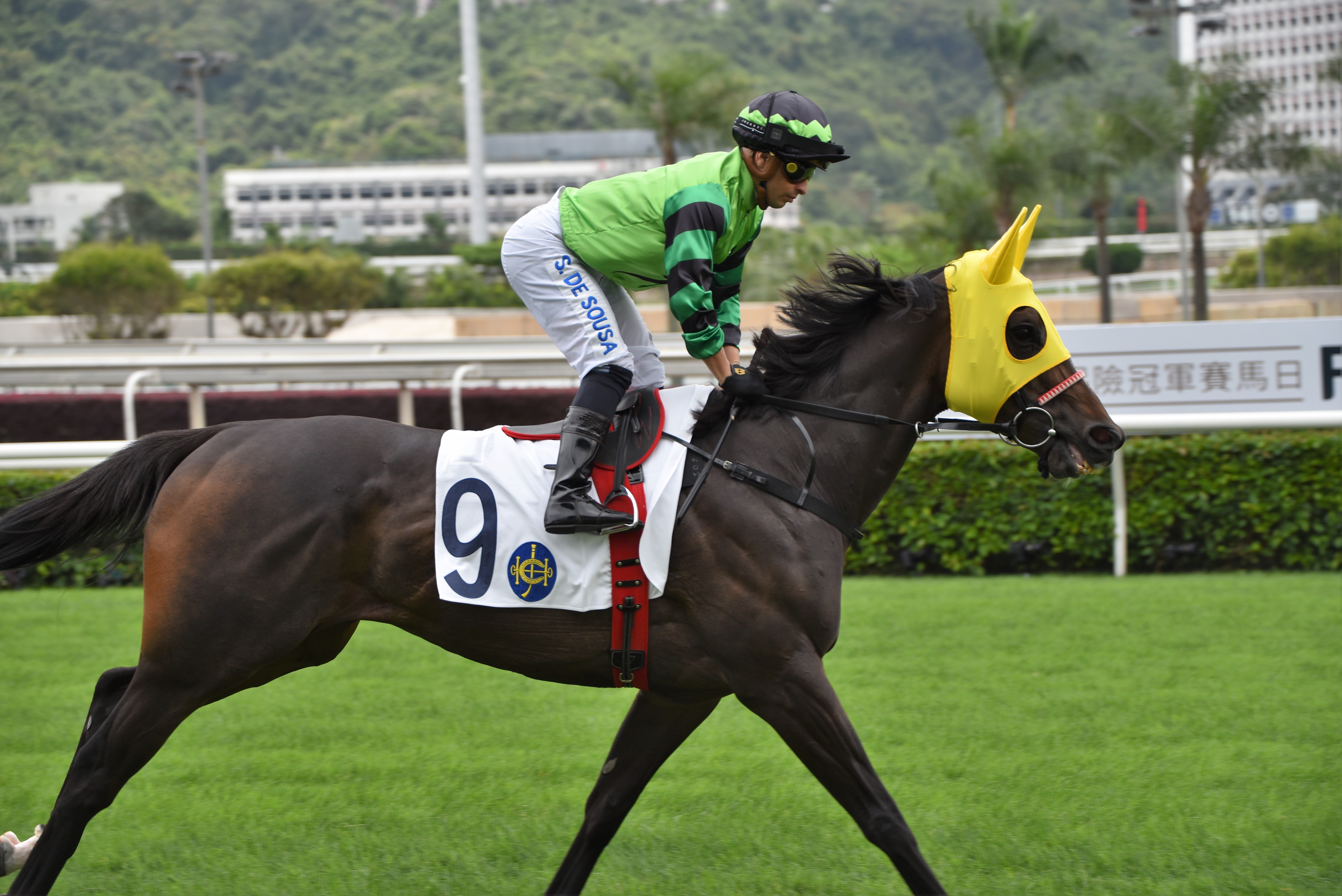
- Silvestre de Sousa at the Sha Tin Racecourse in 2023

Personal information
- Born: 31 December 1980 (age 45) São Francisco do Maranhão, Brazil
- Occupation: Jockey
- Height: 5.2 ft (158 cm)
- Weight: 8 st 3 lb (115 lb; 52 kg)

Horse racing career
- Sport: Horse racing
- Career wins: 4000+

Major racing wins
- Major races 1000 Guineas Stakes (2024); Champion Stakes (2013); Lockinge Stakes (2013); International Stakes (2015); Premio Roma (2012); Dubai Turf (2013); Dubai World Cup (2014))

Honours
- British flat racing Champion Jockey (2015, 2017, 2018); Lester Award for Flat Jockey of the Year (2015)

Significant horses
- African Story, Farhh

Silvestre de Sousa (born 31 December 1980 in São Francisco do Maranhão, Brazil) is a Brazilian flat racing jockey who is based in Britain and was three times champion jockey (2015, 2017, 2018).

== Background and early career ==
De Sousa was born in São Francisco do Maranhão, Maranhão, the youngest of ten siblings. He moved to São Paulo when he was 17 years old and sat on a racehorse for the first time when he was 18. This came after a chance meeting with a man who worked at the local Cidade Jardim racecourse, who introduced him to Fausto Durso (one of the leading jockeys in São Paulo at the time, later twice champion jockey in Macau). Durso suggested that de Sousa had the build of a jockey. In an interview with the magazine Thoroughbred Owner & Breeder, de Sousa remembered an inauspicious beginning to his career. “I started very badly…it took me six months to get my first ride, but 16 months later I was champion apprentice and had lost my claim.”

== David Nicholls ==
In 2004 de Sousa moved to Ireland, joining trainer Dermot Weld. However, the move did not work out; de Sousa initially struggled to adjust to the change in environment. After two years without a racecourse ride in public, he was offered the chance to move to England and link up with Thirsk-based trainer David Nicholls. He rode in his first race soon after and by the end of his first season in Britain (2006) he had ridden 27 winners from 195 runners for a win rate of 14 percent.

== Mark Johnston ==
With Nicholls using his son Adrian as first jockey, de Sousa decided to freelance. After winning 21, 35 and 68 races in 2007, 2008 and 2009 respectively, he reached his maiden century of winners in 2010 and attracted the attention of northern trainer Mark Johnston. In a 2011 BBC interview Johnston said, "I noticed him last season when he rode 100 winners for mainly small trainers, often on horses at long odds".

With support from the Mark Johnston yard, de Sousa made a good start in 2011. After initially being excluded from some bookmakers’ lists for the flat-jockeys’ championship, with monthly totals of 24, 20 and 27 winners in May, June and July respectively he was heading the title race. His association with Johnston led to big wins at Epsom Racecourse on Derby Day and twice at Royal Ascot; his first wins at the Royal meeting came on Fox Hunt in the Duke of Edinburgh Stakes and Namibian in the Queen's Vase. De Sousa described his Ascot victories as "unbelievable", saying “when you look at my background, you would never think I would ride a winner in Royal Ascot”.

The 2010 champion jockey Paul Hanagan regained the lead by September; having incurred a four-day suspension in early October, de Sousa's chances of a first title were fading. He continued to focus on his championship challenge with 32 winners in October; however, Mark Johnston's decision to put de Sousa on Fox Hunt in Australia's Melbourne Cup was another blow to his title bid. Explaining the logic behind his decision to send de Sousa to Melbourne to ride the Duke Of Edinburgh winner, Johnston said “He (de Sousa) would rather win four races at Wolverhampton and be called champion jockey than have to come out here. But I hope that if he wins the Melbourne Cup then he'll realize that's much bigger than being champion jockey”. Fox Hunt finished seventh in the Cup.

Despite failing (by four winners) to pass Hanagan in the title race, 2011 was de Sousa's best-ever season. He finished with 161 winners. While Hanagan suggested he would not try for a third successive title, de Sousa had no such qualms. "I don't have to waste. I wake up every morning, eight stone. Of course, I get tired at the end of the day but after sleeping, you're fresh again."

He was again runner-up (to Richard Hughes) in 2012, and third behind Hughes in 2013.

== Godolphin ==
From 2012 to 2015 de Sousa was retained as a jockey by Godolphin. He won his first Group 1 on Hunter's Light in the 2012 Premio Roma and landed further Group 1 success with Sajjhaa in the 2013 Dubai Duty Free Stakes, Farhh in the 2013 Lockinge and Champion Stakes and African Story in the 2014 Dubai World Cup.

Soon after losing his retainer with Godolphin, de Sousa was crowned British flat racing Champion Jockey 2015. The following year he finished second in the championship to Crowley, but regained his title in 2017. He rode his 200th winner of the year at Lingfield on 18 October, and with 155 wins in the Championship period, he effectively won the title with weeks to spare. He identified the highlights of his year as the day he rode six winners - five at Sandown and one at Goodwood - and his Cesarewitch Handicap win on Withhold. Speaking of retaining his title, he said, "I can't see why I won't be going for a third title. I want to do very well again next year and if I had the same support this year I hope to ride plenty of winners. If the good horses come I will ride them, but if not I will go to Catterick [a relatively minor track] and anywhere else to ride the winners."

== King Power Racing ==
De Sousa retained his champion jockey title in 2018, beating Oisin Murphy into second place. He spent the winter racing in Hong Kong, where he rode more than 40 winners, including Group 1 victory on Glorious Forever in the Hong Kong Cup in December. He returned to Britain at the start of the 2019 season, having signed a retainer in late 2018 with King Power Racing, the operation founded by the late Leicester City owner Vichai Srivaddhanaprabha and run by his son, Aiyawatt.

== Hong Kong ==
After three seasons riding for King Power Racing, de Sousa was released from his contract and spent the 2022 season riding as a freelance. Having found it difficult to re-establish himself as a freelance, de Sousa moved to Hong Kong for the start of the season in September 2022. During the winter he rode 45 winners and was in fifth place in the jockeys' standings, with his mounts earning £7.7 million in prize money.

On May 12, 2023, de Sousa was given a 10 month ban by the Hong Kong Jockey Club for a breach of betting rules, after he admitted facilitating fellow jockey Vagner Borges in placing a bet on a horse. He withdrew an appeal against the length of the ban.

== Return to Britain ==
After serving his ban, de Sousa returned to Britain in March 2024, riding as a freelance. On 3 May 2024 he achieved his first success in a Classic race when he rode Elmalka, trained by Roger Varian to victory in the 1000 Guineaa. This was followed later the same month by a second Classic victory when he rode Devil's Point in the Grade 2 German 2,000 Guineas.

== Personal life ==
De Sousa is married to bloodstock agent and former apprentice jockey Victoria Behan. The couple have three sons.

== Major wins ==
(United Kingdom) Great Britain

- 1000 Guineas - (1) - Elmalka (2024)
- British Champions Sprint Stakes - (1) - Donjuan Triumphant (2019)
- International Stakes - (1) - Arabian Queen (2015)
- Champion Stakes - (1) - Farhh (2013)
- Lockinge Stakes - (1) - Farhh (2013)
- Nunthorpe Stakes - (1) - Winter Power (2021)
- Queen Anne Stakes - (1) - Charyn (2024)
- Queen Elizabeth II Stakes - (1) - Charyn (2024)

France

- Prix Jacques Le Marois - (1) - Charyn (2024)
- Prix Morny - (1) - Pretty Pollyanna (2018)

Hong Kong

- Hong Kong Cup - (1) - Glorious Forever (2018)

Hungary

- Kincsem Dij (Local Group 1) – (1) – Claymore (2025)

Italy

- Premio Roma – (1) – Hunter's Light (2012)

United Arab Emirates

- Dubai Turf - (1) - Sajjhaa (2013)
- Dubai World Cup - (1) - African Story (2014)
- Al Maktoum Challenge, Round 3 - (1) - Hunter's Light (2013)
