= Meydan Racecourse =

Racecourse in Dubai, United Arab Emirates

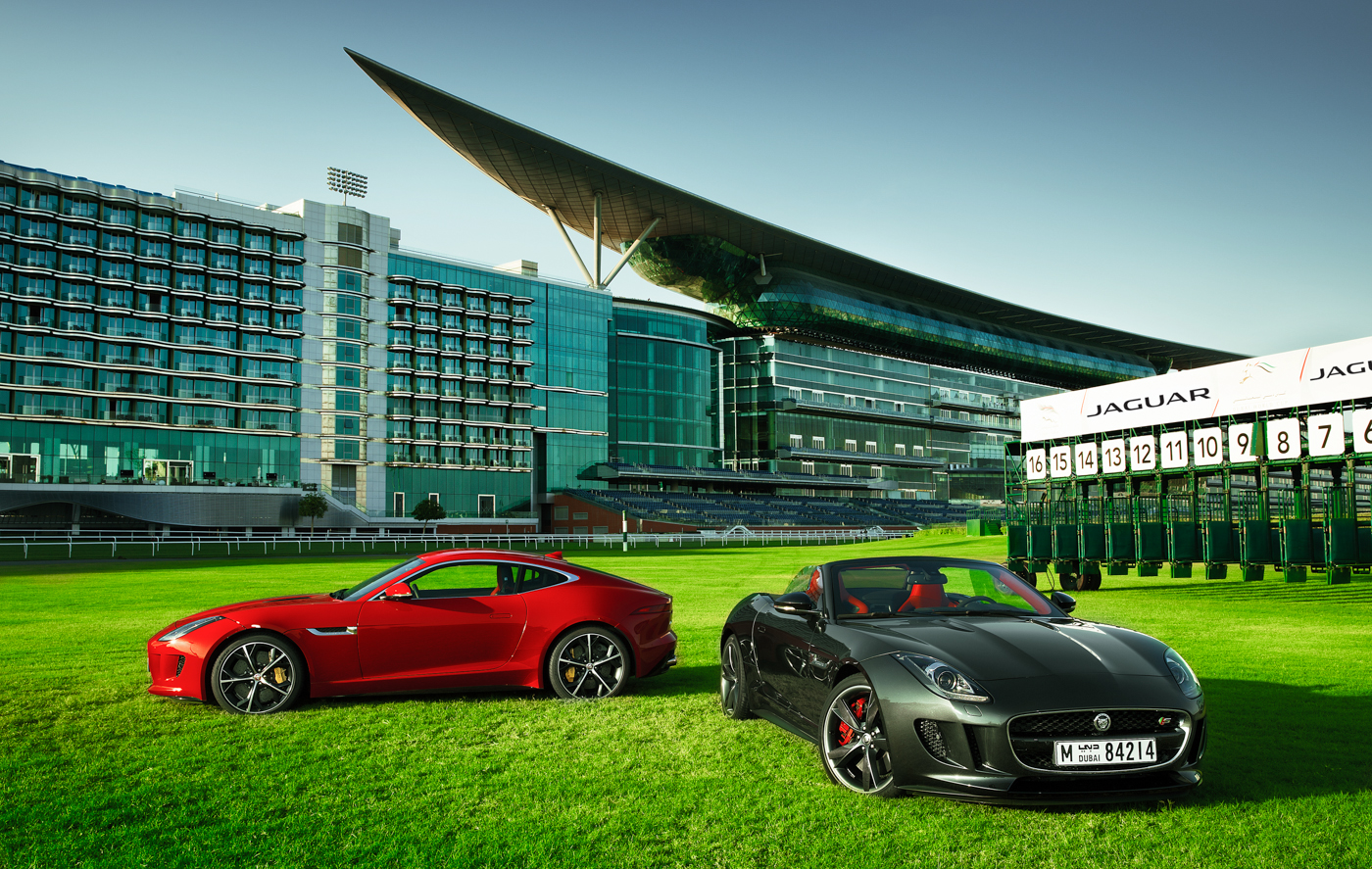
- The grandstand at Meydan
- Location: Meydan City, Dubai
- Coordinates: 25°09′22″N 55°18′24″E
- Owned by: Dubai Racing Club
- Date opened: 27 March 2010
- Course type: Flat
- Notable races: Dubai World Cup

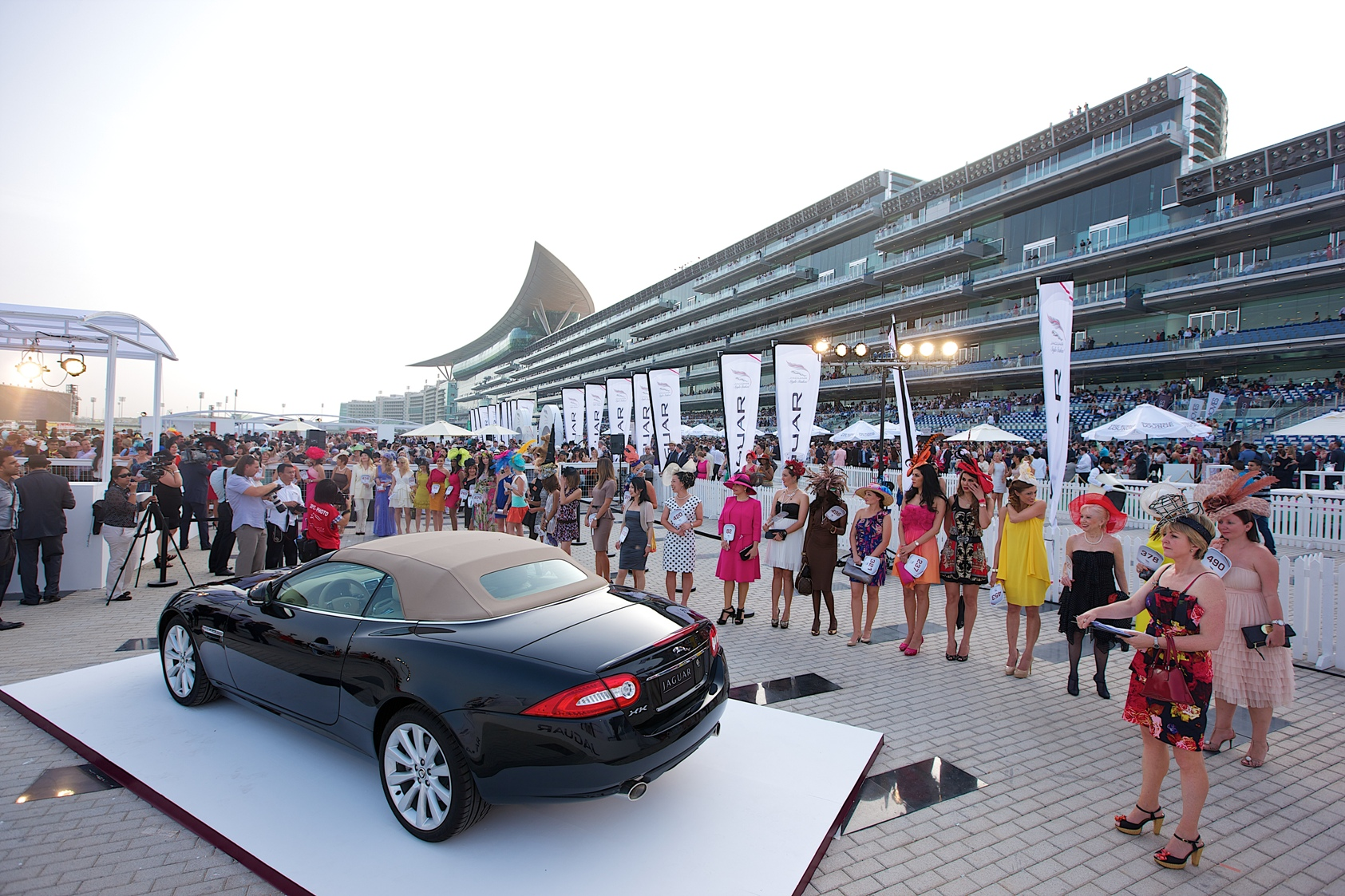
The Meydan grandstand

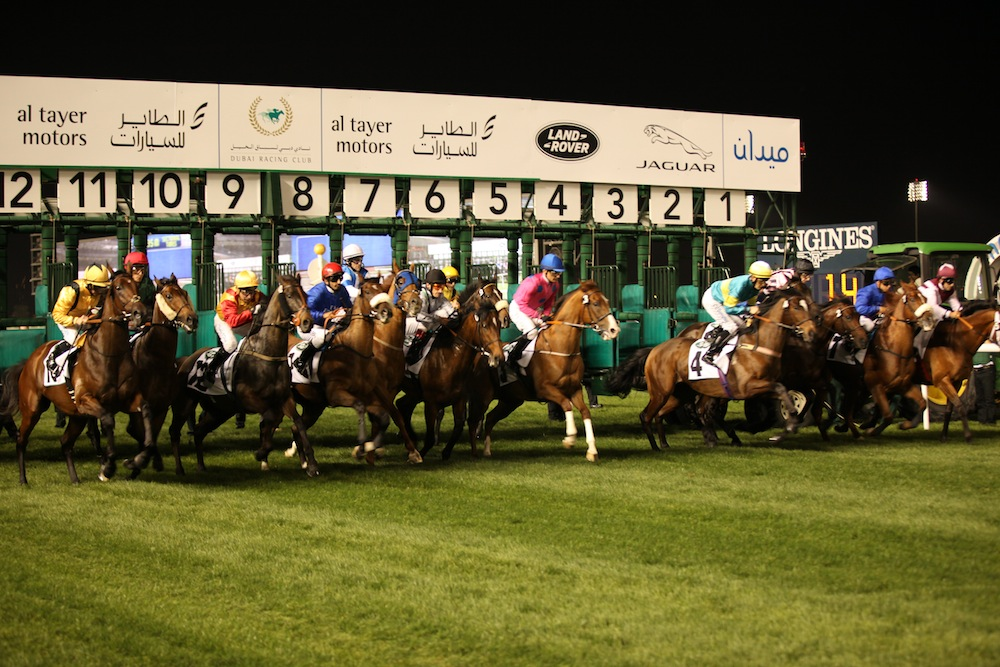
A race at Meydan

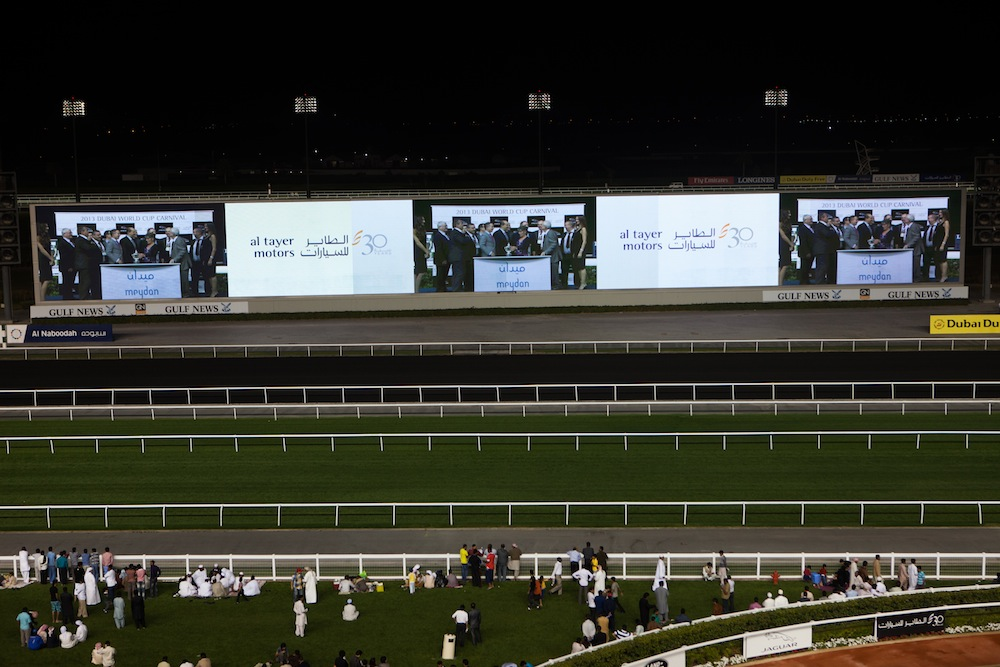
Meydan had the world's longest television screen

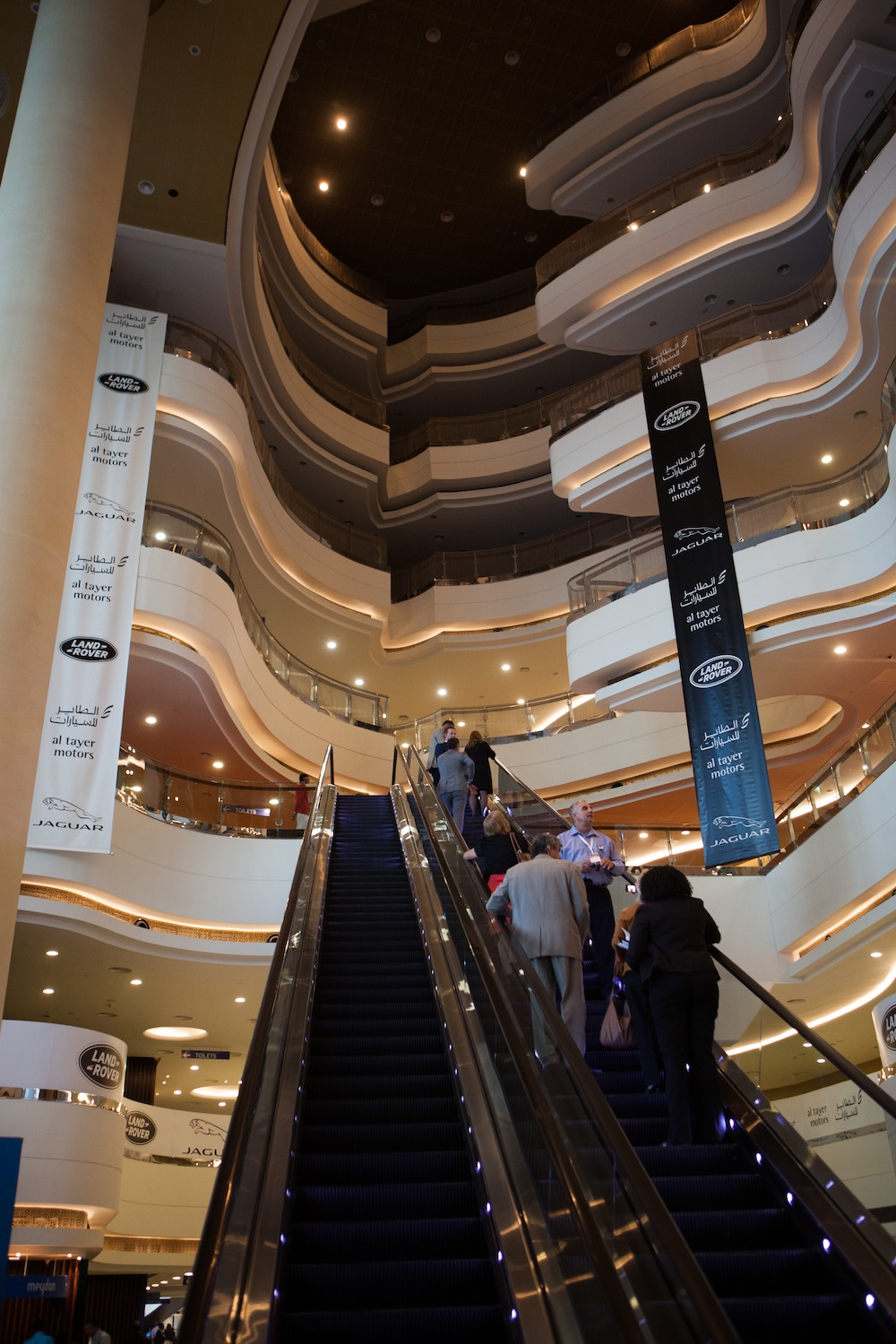
Meydan Grandstand interior

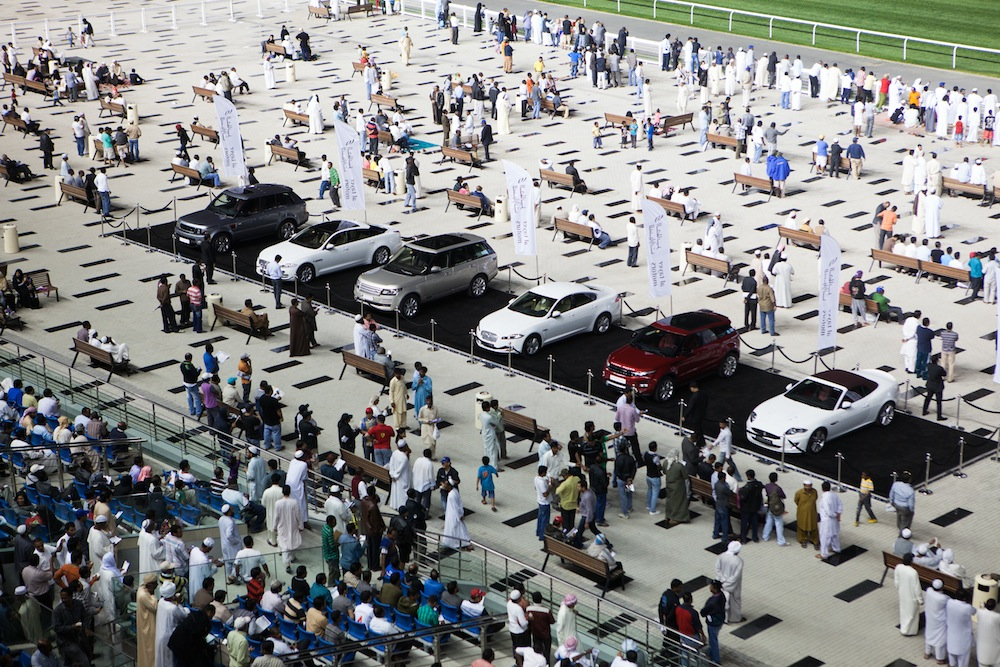
Part of the spectator terrace at Meydan

Meydan Racecourse is a racecourse in Dubai, United Arab Emirates. The grandstand is a half mile in length, and can accommodate over 60,000 spectators.

Meydan opened on 27 March 2010, replacing Nad Al Sheba Racecourse, which formerly occupied the same site. It includes a horse racing museum, gallery and five-star hotel and nine-hole golf course. When not in use for racing it serves as a business and conference centre. The track's interior was also used as a filming location for the film Star Trek Beyond, depicting the docking bay where the USS Enterprise is moored, including the bar scene during the film's climax which contains a ship construction bay.

On February 16, 2024, Saffie Osborne became the first female jockey to win a race at Meydan, winning the Lord Glitters Handicap.

== The Meydan grandstand ==
The 7.5 million m^{2} Meydan Racecourse includes Meydan Marina, The Meydan, the world's first five-star trackside hotel with 285 rooms, two race tracks and the Grandstand, which consists of a hotel, restaurants, a racing museum and 72 corporate suites for entertaining throughout the year. It has a 2,400 m left-handed turf race track and a left-handed 8.75-furlong (1,750 m) dirt course. It operates from November through March and features the Winter Racing Challenge, Dubai International Racing Carnival and the Dubai World Cup Night. The Dubai World Cup is the world's richest race day with over US$26.25 million in prize money.

The Racecourse district occupies 67 million sq ft (620 ha); the overall Meydan City development however is 200 million sq ft (1,900 ha). The Meydan Racecourse and Meydan City were master planned by Teo A. Khing Design Consultants (TAK). The Racecourse is divided into four sub-districts: Meydan Racecourse, Meydan Metropolis, Meydan Horizons, and Meydan Godolphin Parks. Meydan is closely affiliated with Mohammed bin Rashid Al Maktoum, UAE Vice President and Prime Minister and Ruler of Dubai.

Lady Gaga performed there on 10 September 2014 as part of her world tour, ArtRave: The Artpop Ball, in support of her third studio album ARTPOP. The racecourse has also hosted concerts by Elton John, Santana, Kylie Minogue, Janet Jackson and Sia.

== Major Thoroughbred races ==
- Dubai World Cup
- Dubai Golden Shaheen
- Dubai Sheema Classic
- Dubai Turf
- Godolphin Mile
- Jebel Hatta
- Al Maktoum Challenge

== See also ==
- Nad Al Sheba Racecourse
