= Premier Bowl =

Horse race in Hong Kong

The Premier Bowl is a Group 2 Thoroughbred handicap horse race in Hong Kong, run at Sha Tin over 1200 metres in October.

Horses rated 90 and above are qualified to enter this race.

== Winners ==
Year	Winner	Age	Jockey	Trainer	Time
2006	Absolute Champion	5	Eddy Lai Wai-ming	David Hall	1:08.10
2007	Royal Delight	5	Shane Dye	Caspar Fownes	1:07.60
2008	Green Birdie	5	Olivier Doleuze	Caspar Fownes	1:08.81
2009	Inspiration	6	Derek Leung Ka-chun	John Moore	1:09.02
2010	Cerise Cherry	5	Howard Cheng Yue-tin	Derek Cruz	1:08.71
2011	Rich Unicorn	5	Mark Du Plessis	John Size	1:08.82
2012	Cerise Cherry	7	Richard Fourie	Derek Cruz	1:08.55
2013	Sterling City	5	João Moreira	John Moore	1:09.11
2014	Aerovelocity	6	Zac Purton	Paul O'Sullivan	1:08.70
2015	Able Friend	6	Karis Teetan	John Moore	1:08.35
2016	Lucky Bubbles	5	Brett Prebble	Francis Lui Kin-wai	1:08.29
2017	Mr Stunning	4	Nash Rawiller	John Size	1:08.10
2018	Hot King Prawn	4	Sam Clipperton	John Size	1:08.23
2019	Seasons Bloom	7	Grant Van Niekerk	Danny Shum Chap-shing	1:08.83
2020	Wishful Thinker	7	Derek Leung Ka-chun	Dennis Yip Chor-hong	1:07.89
2021	Lucky Patch	5	Zac Purton	Francis Lui Kin-wai	1:07.95
2022	Wellington	6	Alexis Badel	Richard Gibson	1:07.78
2023	Sight Success	7	Brenton Avdulla	John Size	1:08.27
2024	Ka Ying Rising	4	Zac Purton	David Hayes	1:07.57
2025	Tomodachi Kokoroe	7	Harry Bentley	David Hayes	1:07.39
2026	Raging Blizzard	7	Brenton Avdulla	John Size	1:07.71

== See also ==
- List of Hong Kong horse races
