= Sha Tin Vase =

Horse race in China

The Sha Tin Vase is a Group 3 Thoroughbred handicap horse race in Hong Kong, run at Sha Tin over 1200 metres in May.

Horses rated 95 and above are qualified to enter this race.

== Records ==
Leading jockey (5 wins):

- Zac Purton – Aerovelocity (2014), Winner's Way (2018), Little Giant (2019), Thanks Forever (2020), Lucky Sweynesse (2023)

Leading trainer (4 wins):

- John Moore – Captain Sweet (2012), Charles The Great (2014), Not Listenin'tome (2015), Thanks Forever (2020)

== Winners ==
| Year | Winner | Age | Jockey | Trainer | Time |
| 2012 | Captain Sweet | 4 | Brett Prebble | John Moore | 1:09.54 |
| 2013 | Charles The Great | 4 | Tommy Berry | John Moore | 1:08.94 |
| 2014 | Aerovelocity | 5 | Zac Purton | Paul O'Sullivan | 1:09.10 |
| 2015 | Not Listenin'tome | 4 | João Moreira | John Moore | 1:08.47 |
| 2016 | Peniaphobia | 5 | Matthew Chadwick | Tony Cruz | 1:08.35 |
| 2017 | Lucky Year | 5 | Callan Murray | Danny Shum Chap-shing | 1:09.27 |
| 2018 | Winner's Way | 5 | Zac Purton | Tony Cruz | 1:08.17 |
| 2019 | Little Giant | 6 | Zac Purton | David Hall | 1:08.82 |
| 2020 | Thanks Forever | 4 | Zac Purton | John Moore | 1:08.96 |
| 2021 | Courier Wonder | 3 | João Moreira | John Size | 1:08.16 |
| 2022 | Cordyceps Six | 3 | Alexis Badel | Richard Gibson | 1:08.40 |
| 2023 | Lucky Sweynesse | 4 | Zac Purton | Manfred Man Ka-leung | 1:08.00 |
| 2024 | Ka Ying Rising | 3 | Karis Teetan | David Hayes | 1:08.00 |
| 2025 | Helios Express | 5 | Hugh Bowman | John Size | 1:08.14 |
| 2026 | Patch Of Stars | 4 | Karis Teetan | Manfred Man Ka-leung | 1:07.94 |

== See also ==
- List of Hong Kong horse races
