= Sprint Cup (Hong Kong) =

The Sprint Cup is a set weights Group 2 Thoroughbred horse race in Hong Kong, run at Sha Tin over 1200 metres in April.

Horses three years old and older are qualified to enter this race.

== Winners ==
Year	Winner	Age	Jockey	Trainer	Time
2008	Sacred Kingdom	4	Howard Cheng Yue-tin	Ricky Yiu Poon-fai	1:08.50
2009	Sacred Kingdom	5	Brett Prebble	Ricky Yiu Poon-fai	1:08.48
2010	Ultra Fantasy	7	Alex Lai Hoi-wing	Ricky Yiu Poon-fai	1:09.89
2011	Multiglory	4	Matthew Chadwick	Tony Cruz	1:08.95
2012	Little Bridge	5	Zac Purton	Danny Shum Chap-shing	1:09.18
2013	Rich Tapestry	5	Olivier Doleuze	Michael Chang Chun-wai	1:09.51
2014	Charles The Great	5	Douglas Whyte	John Moore	1:09.09
2015	Dundonnell	5	Stéphane Pasquier	Richard Gibson	1:08.37
2016	Lucky Bubbles	4	Brett Prebble	Francis Lui Kin-wai	1:08.36
2017	Mr Stunning	4	João Moreira	John Size	1:08.46
2018	Beat The Clock	4	João Moreira	John Size	1:09.02
2019	Rattan	5	Chad Schofield	Richard Gibson	1:08.14
2020	Voyage Warrior	4	Vincent Ho Chak-yiu	Ricky Yiu Poon-fai	1:09.48
2021	Amazing Star	6	Vagner Borges	Jimmy Ting Koon-ho	1:08.24
2022	Wellington	5	Alexis Badel	Richard Gibson	1:08.23
2023	Lucky Sweynesse	4	Zac Purton	Manfred Man Ka-leung	1:09.15
2024	Lucky Sweynesse	5	Hugh Bowman	Manfred Man Ka-leung	1:09.17
2025	Ka Ying Rising	4	Zac Purton	David Hayes	1:08.18
2026	Ka Ying Rising	5	Zac Purton	David Hayes	1:07.12

== See also ==
- List of Hong Kong horse races
