= Chairman's Sprint Prize =

Flat horse race in Hong Kong

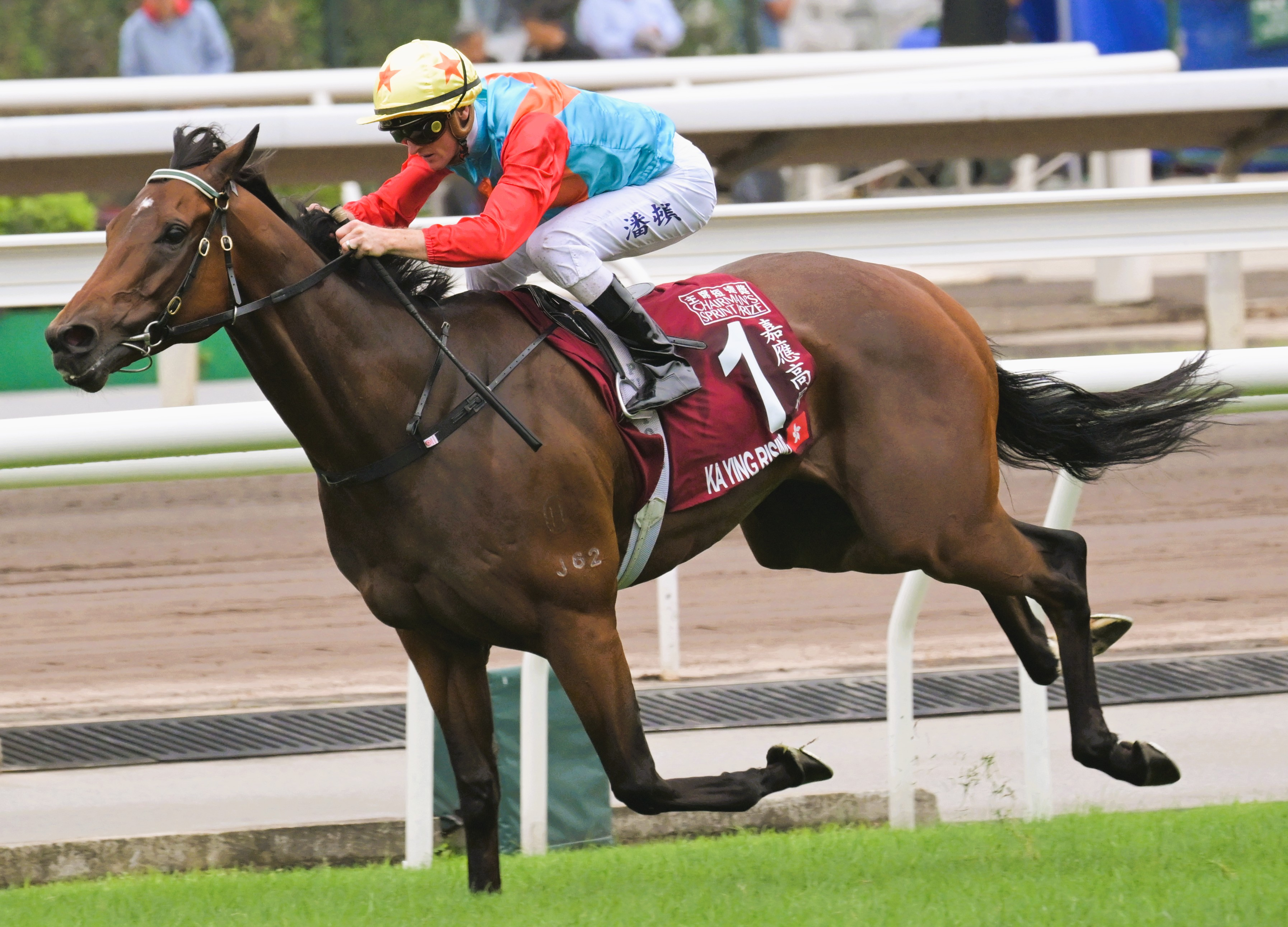
- 2025 winner Ka Ying Rising
- Class: Group 1
- Location: Sha Tin Racecourse; Hong Kong
- Inaugurated: 1979
- Race type: Flat / Thoroughbred
- Website: Chairman's Sprint Prize

Race information
- Distance: 1,200 meters (About 6 furlongs)
- Surface: Turf
- Track: Right-handed
- Qualification: Three-years-old and up
- Weight: 122 lb (3y); 126 lb (4y+); Allowances; 4 lb for fillies and mares 4 lb for N. Hemisphere 3-y-o
- Purse: HK$20,000,000 (2023)

The Chairman's Sprint Prize is a Group 1 Thoroughbred horse race in Hong Kong, run over a distance of 1200 metres. Until 2000, it was run as the Hong Kong Sprint Championship to coincide with the opening of Sha Tin Racecourse. In 2016, this race became the 4th round of the Global Sprint Challenge, and was elevated to International Group 1 status. This race offers a purse of HK$20,000,000.

== Winners since 1994 ==
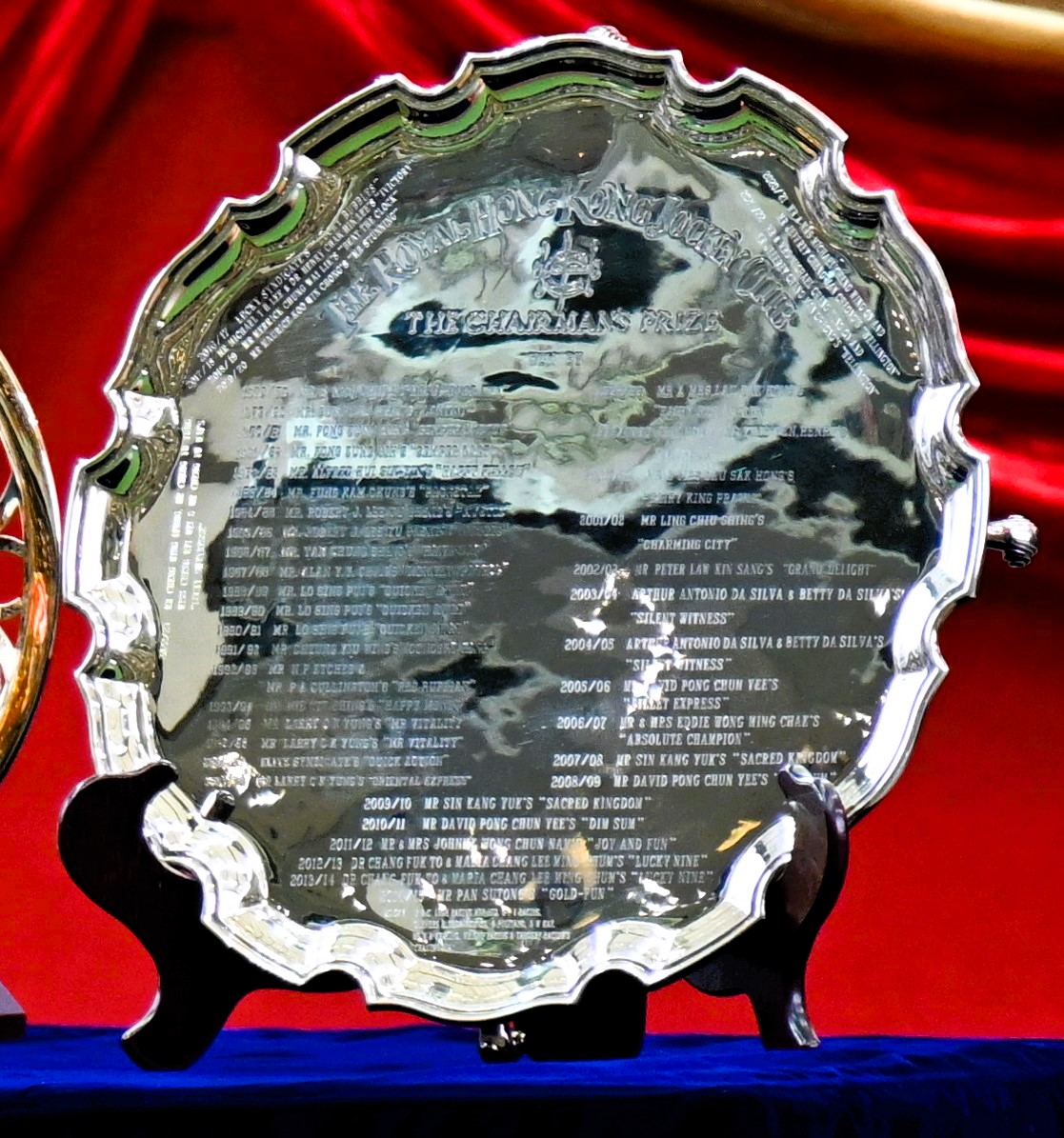
Trophy

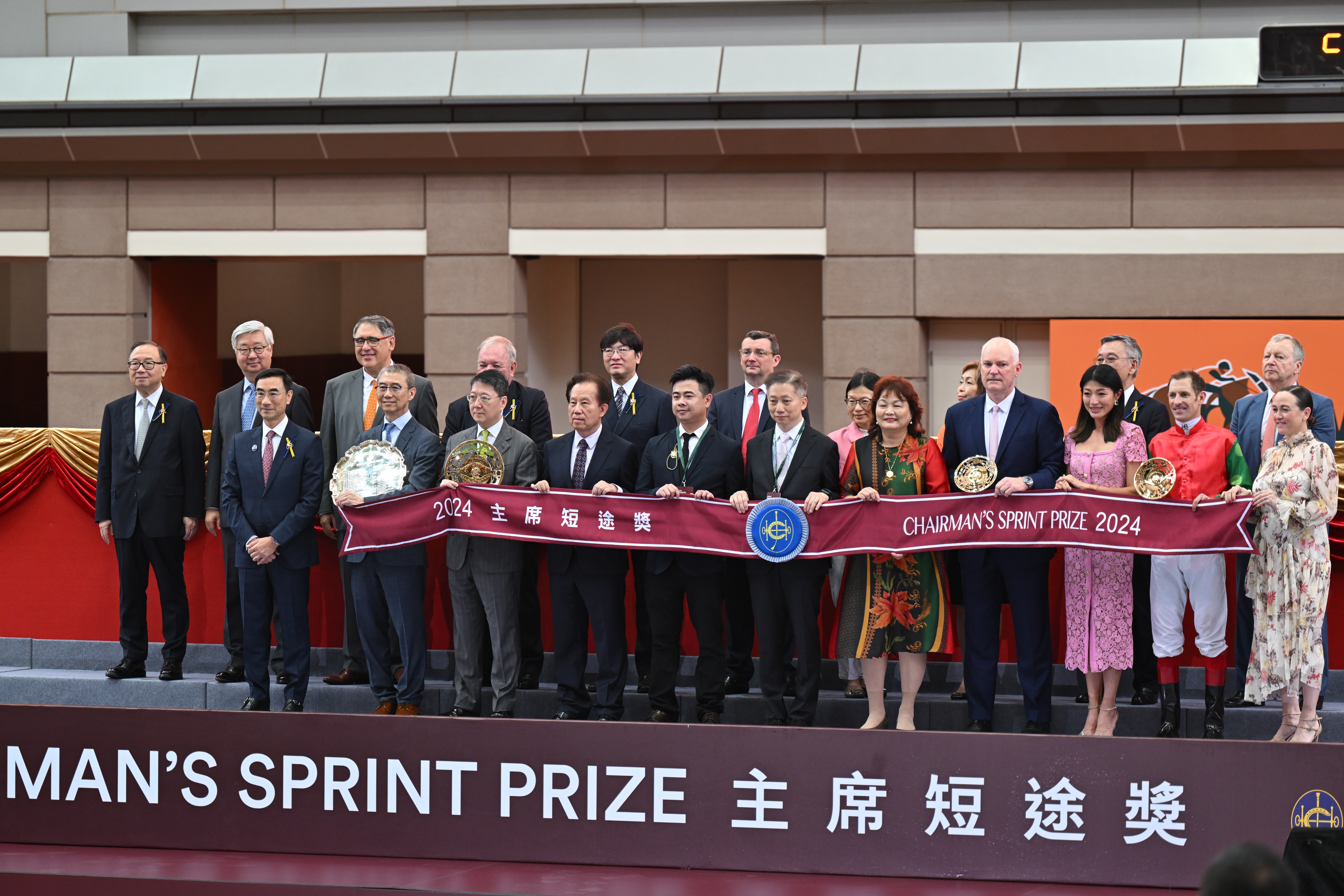
Trophy presentation ceremony of the 2024 race

Year	Winner	Age	Jockey	Trainer	Owner	Time
1991	Quicken Away	6	Tony Ives	Peter B. K. Ng	Lo Sing Pui	1:09:70
1992	Concert King	4	Basil Marcus	David Hill	Chuen Yu Wing W.H. & W.K. Cheung	1:11.40
1993	Red Ruffian	4	Basil Marcus	David Hill	N P Etches & P A Cullington	1:10.10
1994	Happy Money	5	John Marshall	John Moore	Nie Tit Shing	1:09.8
1995	Mr. Vitality	3	Basil Marcus	Ivan Allan	Larry Yung	1:09.7
1996	Mr. Vitality	4	Basil Marcus	Ivan Allan	Larry Yung	1:10.9
1997	Quick Action	6	Eric Saint-Martin	Ivan Allan	Elite Synd.	1:10.6
1998	Oriental Express	5	Douglas Whyte	Ivan Allan	Larry C. K. Yung	1:09.6
1999	Fairy King Prawn	3	Steven King	Ricky Yiu Poon-fai	Mr & Mrs Lau Sak Hong	1:11.0
2000	Tajasur	5	Basil Marcus	Ivan Allan	Henry Tang	1:09.3
2001	Fairy King Prawn	5	Weichong Marwing	Ivan Allan	Mr & Mrs Lau Sak Hong	1:10.0
2002	Charming City	5	Dwayne Dunn	David Hayes	Ling Chiu Shing	1:08.8
2003	Grand Delight	5	Shane Dye	John Size	Peter Law Kin Sang	1:09.0
2004	Silent Witness	4	Felix Coetzee	Tony Cruz	Mr & Mrs Arthur Antonio da Silva	1:08.5
2005	Silent Witness	5	Felix Coetzee	Tony Cruz	Mr & Mrs Arthur Antonio da Silva	1:08.4
2006	Billet Express	5	Christophe Soumillon	John Moore	David Pong Chun Yee	1:09.7
2007	Absolute Champion	5	Brett Prebble	David Hall	Mr & Mrs Eddie Wong Ming Chak	1:08.2
2008	Sacred Kingdom	4	Gérald Mossé	Ricky Yiu Poon-fai	Sin Kang Yuk	1:08.6
2009	Dim Sum	5	James Winks	John Moore	David Pong Chun Yee	1:09.49
2010	Sacred Kingdom	6	Brett Prebble	Ricky Yiu Poon-fai	Sin Kang Yuk	1:09.23
2011	Dim Sum	7	Olivier Doleuze	John Moore	David Pong Chun Yee	1:08.74
2012	Joy And Fun	8	Brett Doyle	Derek Cruz	Mr. & Mrs. Johnny Wong Chun Nam	1:08.98
2013	Lucky Nine	6	Brett Prebble	Caspar Fownes	Dr. Chang Fuk To & Maria Chang Lee Ming Shum	1:09.28
2014	Lucky Nine	7	Brett Prebble	Caspar Fownes	Dr. Chang Fuk To & Maria Chang Lee Ming Shum	1:09.37
2015	Gold-Fun	6	Christophe Soumillon	Richard Gibson	Pan Sutong	1:08.79
2016	Chautauqua (AUS)	5	Tommy Berry	Michael, Wayne & John Hawkes	R & C Legh Racing	1:08.69
2017	Lucky Bubbles	5	Hugh Bowman	Francis Lui Kin-wai	Lucky Syndicate	1:08.96
2018	Ivictory	4	Zac Purton	John Size	Michael T H Lee & Dr Henry Chan Hin Lee	1:08.63
2019	Beat The Clock	5	João Moreira	John Size	Merrick Chung Wai Lik	1:08.26
2020	Mr Stunning	7	Karis Teetan	Frankie Lor Fu-chuen	Maurice Koo Win Chong	1:08.40
2021	Wellington	4	Alexis Badel	Richard Gibson	Michael Cheng Wing On & Jeffrey Cheng Man Cheong	1:08.64
2022	Wellington	5	Alexis Badel	Richard Gibson	Michael Cheng Wing On & Jeffrey Cheng Man Cheong	1:08.09
2023	Lucky Sweynesse	4	Zac Purton	Manfred Man Ka-leung	Cheng Ming Leung, Cheng Yu Tung, Cheng Mei Mei & Cheng Yu Wai	1:08.38
2024	Invincible Sage	4	Hugh Bowman	David Hall	David Hall Trainer Syndicate	1:09.33
2025	Ka Ying Rising	4	Zac Purton	David Hayes	Ka Ying Syndicate	1:07.88
2026	Ka Ying Rising	5	Zac Purton	David Hayes	Ka Ying Syndicate	1:07.10

== See also ==
- List of Hong Kong horse races
