= Jockey Club Sprint =

The Jockey Club Sprint is a Group 2 set weights Thoroughbred horse race in Hong Kong, run over 1200 metres. In the 2003/2004 racing season, this race was upgraded to a domestic Group 2 event. The race was promoted to International Group 2 status in 2010. The prize money in season 2011/12 is HK$3,000,000, which was increased to HK$3,875,000 in season 2014/15.

== Winners ==
Year	Winner	Age	Jockey	Trainer	Time
2010 (dh)	Rocket Man; One World	5; 6	Felix Coetzee; Darren Beadman	Patrick Shaw; John Moore	1:08.82
2011	Little Bridge	5	Gérald Mossé	C S Shum	1:08.67
2012	Lucky Nine	5	Brett Prebble	Caspar Fownes	1:08.83
2013	Charles The Great	4	Douglas Whyte	John Moore	1:09.58
2014	Peniaphobia	3	Douglas Whyte	Tony Cruz	1:08.08
2015	Gold-Fun	6	Christophe Soumillon	Richard Gibson	1:08.31
2016	Not Listenin'tome	6	Hugh Bowman	John Moore	1:08.26
2017	Mr Stunning	5	Nash Rawiller	John Size	1:09.33
2018	Hot King Prawn	4	João Moreira	John Size	1:08.59
2019	Aethero	3	Karis Teetan	John Moore	1:07.58
2020	Hot King Prawn	6	João Moreira	John Size	1:08.00
2021	Lucky Patch	5	Jerry Chau Chun-lok	Francis Lui Kin-wai	1:07.98
2022	Lucky Sweynesse	4	Zac Purton	Manfred Man Ka-leung	1:07.55
2023	Lucky Sweynesse	5	Zac Purton	Manfred Man Ka-leung	1:08.42
2024	Ka Ying Rising	4	Zac Purton	David A. Hayes	1:07.43
2025	Ka Ying Rising	5	Zac Purton	David A. Hayes	1:07.33
2026	Ka Ying Rising	6	Zac Purton	David A. Hayes	1:07.93

== See also ==
- List of Hong Kong horse races
