= Hong Kong Sprint =

Longines Hong Kong Sprint
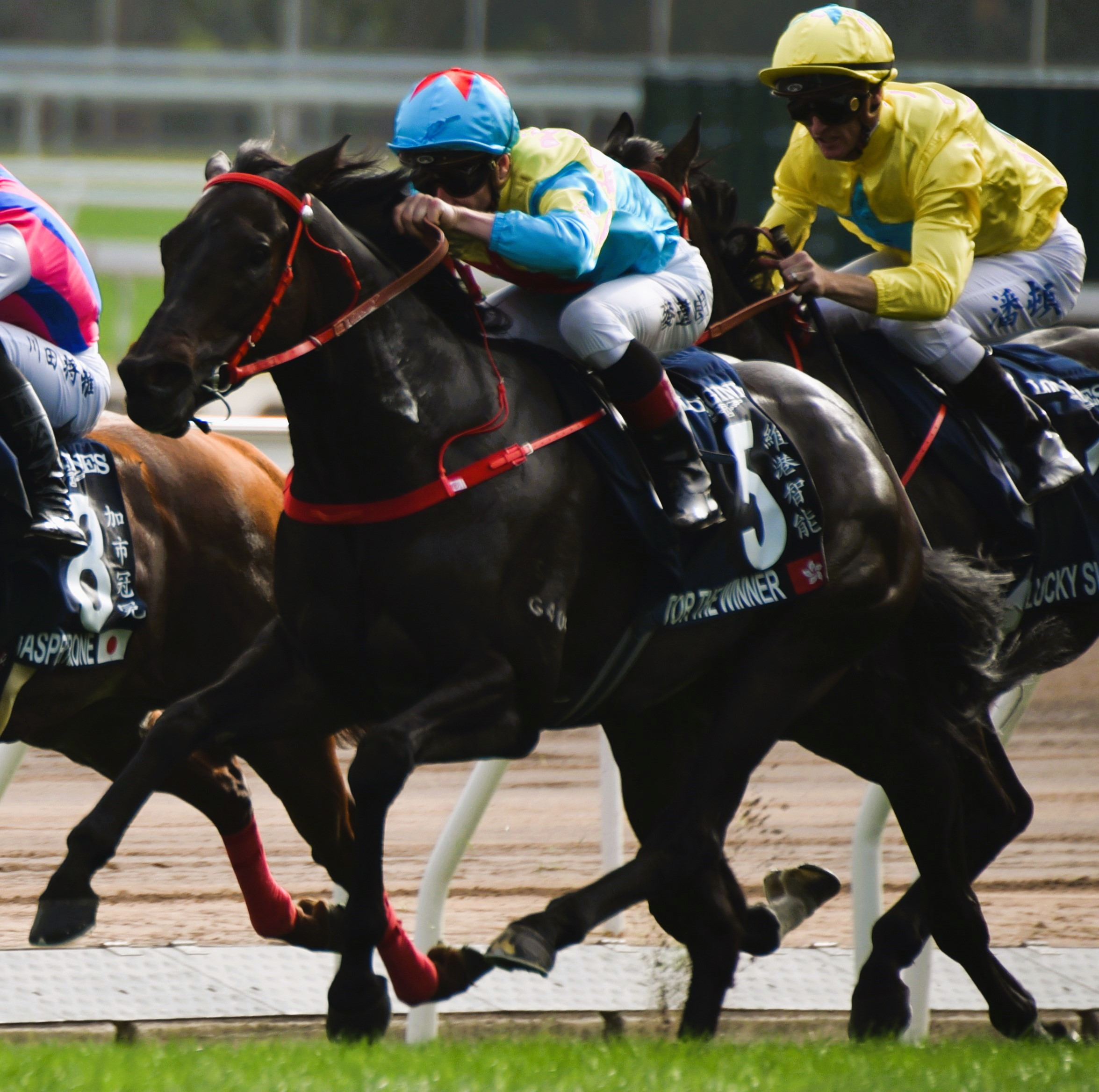
- Victor The Winner at the 2023 Hong Kong Sprint
- Class: Group 1
- Location: Sha Tin Racecourse; Hong Kong, China
- Inaugurated: 1999
- Race type: Flat / Thoroughbred
- Sponsor: Longines
- Website: Hong Kong Jockey Club

Race information
- Distance: 1,200 metres (a6f)
- Surface: Turf
- Track: Right-handed
- Qualification: Three-years-old and up
- Weight: 126 lb Allowances; 4 lb for fillies and mares
- Purse: HK$26,000,000 (2023); 1st: HK$14,560,000
- Bonuses: see Global Sprint Challenge

The Hong Kong Sprint is a Group 1 flat horse race in Hong Kong which is open to thoroughbreds aged three years or older. It is run over a distance of 1,200 metres (about 6 furlongs) at Sha Tin, and takes place in mid-December.

The race was first run in 1999, and originally contested over 1,000 metres. It was richest 1,000m horse race in the world before 2006. It was promoted to Group 1 status in 2002, and the present distance, 1,200 metres, was introduced in 2006. The event is now the final leg in the nine race Global Sprint Challenge series, preceded by The Age Classic.

The Hong Kong Sprint is one of the four Hong Kong International Races, and it presently offers a purse of HK$26,000,000.

== Records ==
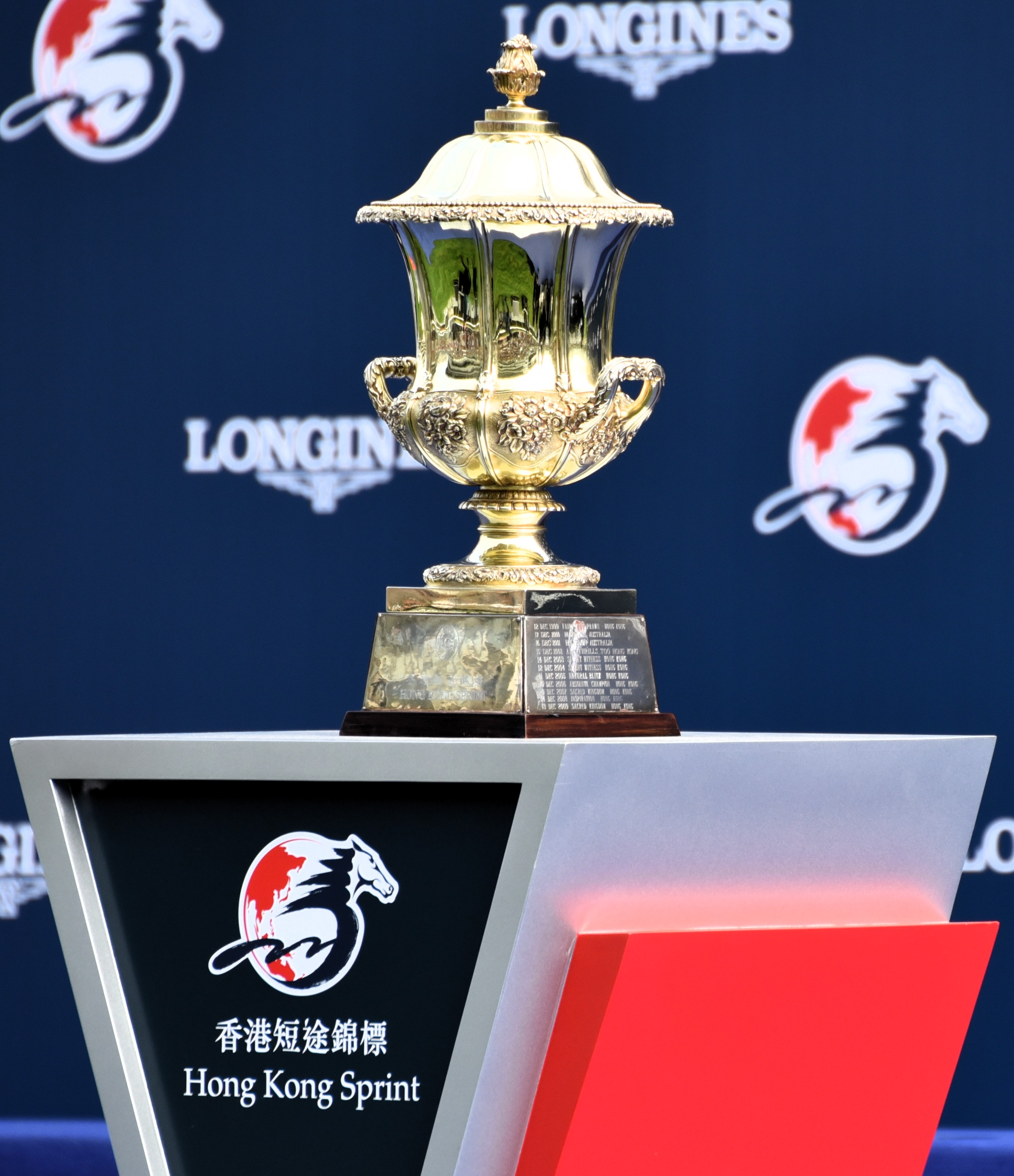
Trophy of the Hong Kong Sprint

Speed record: (at present distance of 1,200 metres)

- 1:07.70 – Ka Ying Rising (2025)

Most wins:

- 2 – Falvelon (2000, 2001)
- 2 – Silent Witness (2003, 2004)
- 2 – Sacred Kingdom (2007, 2009)
- 2 – Lord Kanaloa (2012, 2013)
- 2 – Aerovelocity (2014, 2016)
- 2 – Mr Stunning (2017, 2018)
- 2 - Ka Ying Rising (2024, 2025)

Most wins by a jockey:

- 5 – Zac Purton (2014, 2016, 2023, 2024, 2025)
- 3 – Brett Prebble (2006, 2009, 2011)

Most wins by a trainer:

- 3 – Ricky Yiu (1999, 2007, 2009)

Most wins by an owner:

- 2 – Dawn Falvey et al. (2000, 2001)
- 2 – Archie & Betty da Silva (2003, 2004)
- 2 – Sin Kang Yuk (2007, 2009)
- 2 – Lord Horse Club (2012, 2013)
- 2 – Daniel Yeung Ngai (2014, 2016)
- 2 – Maurice Koo Win Chong (2017, 2018)
- 2 – Ka Ying Syndicate (2024, 2025)

== Winners ==
Year	Winner	Age	Jockey	Trainer (Trained In)	Owner	Time
1999	Fairy King Prawn	4	Steven King	Ricky Yiu Poon-fai (HK)	Mr & Mrs Philip Lau Sak-Hong	0:56.50
2000	Falvelon	4	Damien Oliver	Danny Bougoure (AUS)	Dawn Falvey et al.	0:56.70
2001	Falvelon	5	Damien Oliver	Danny Bougoure (AUS)	Dawn Falvey et al.	0:57.00
2002	All Thrills Too	5	Gérald Mossé	David Hayes (HK)	Alan Lam Man Bun	0:56.40
2003	Silent Witness	4	Felix Coetzee	Tony Cruz (HK)	Archie & Betty da Silva	0:56.50
2004	Silent Witness	5	Felix Coetzee	Tony Cruz (HK)	Archie & Betty da Silva	0:56.80
2005	Natural Blitz	5	Glyn Schofield	Derek Cruz (HK)	Danny Lam Yin Kee	0:57.60
2006	Absolute Champion	5	Brett Prebble	David Hall (HK)	Mr & Mrs Eddie Wong Ming Chak	1:07.80
2007	Sacred Kingdom	4	Gérald Mossé	Ricky Yiu Poon-fai (HK)	Sin Kang Yuk	1:08.40
2008	Inspiration	5	Darren Beadman	John Moore (HK)	Mr & Mrs Hui Sai Fun	1:08.68
2009	Sacred Kingdom	6	Brett Prebble	Ricky Yiu Poon-fai (HK)	Sin Kang Yuk	1:09.16
2010	J J the Jet Plane	6	Piere Strydom	Lucky Houdalakis (SAF)	HSN du Preez, CF Strydom, L Houdalakis, CD Boyens	1:08.84
2011	Lucky Nine	4	Brett Prebble	Caspar Fownes (HK)	Dr Chang Fuk To & Maria Chang Lee Ming Shum	1:08.98
2012	Lord Kanaloa	4	Yasunari Iwata	Takayuki Yasuda (JPN)	Lord Horse Club	1:08.50
2013	Lord Kanaloa	5	Yasunari Iwata	Takayuki Yasuda (JPN)	Lord Horse Club	1:08.25
2014	Aerovelocity	6	Zac Purton	Paul O'Sullivan (HK)	Daniel Yeung Ngai	1:08.57
2015	Peniaphobia	4	João Moreira	Tony Cruz (HK)	Huang Kai Wen	1:08.74
2016	Aerovelocity	8	Zac Purton	Paul O'Sullivan (HK)	Daniel Yeung Ngai	1:08.80
2017	Mr Stunning	5	Nash Rawiller	John Size (HK)	Maurice Koo Win Chong	1:08.40
2018	Mr Stunning	6	Karis Teetan	Frankie Lor Fu-chuen (HK)	Maurice Koo Win Chong	1:08.85
2019	Beat The Clock	6	João Moreira	John Size (HK)	Merrick Chung Wai Lik	1:08.12
2020	Danon Smash	5	Ryan Moore	Takayuki Yasuda (JPN)	Danox Co Ltd	1:08.45
2021	Sky Field	5	Blake Shinn	Caspar Fownes (HK)	Kwan Shiu Man, Jessica Kwan Mun Hang & Jeffrey Kwan Chun Ming	1:08.66
2022	Wellington	6	Ryan Moore	Richard Gibson (HK)	Michael Cheng Wing On & Jeffrey Cheng Man Cheong	1:08.76
2023	Lucky Sweynesse	5	Zac Purton	Manfred Man Ka-leung (HK)	Cheng Ming Leung, Cheng Yu Tung Et Al	1:09.25
2024	Ka Ying Rising	4	Zac Purton	David Hayes (HK)	Ka Ying Syndicate	1:08.15
2025	Ka Ying Rising	5	Zac Purton	David Hayes (HK)	Ka Ying Syndicate	1:07.70

== See also ==
- List of Hong Kong horse races
