= Brave Kid =

Australian-bred Hong Kong racehorse

- Sire: Elusive City
- Grandsire: Elusive Quality
- Dam: Gordon's
- Damsire: Kaapstad
- Sex: Gelding
- Foaled: 30 August 2005
- Country: Australia
- Colour: Bay
- Breeder: Keltern Stud
- Owner: Mr & Mrs Matthew Lam Kin Hong
- Trainer: John Size
- Record: 21:6-0-1
- Earnings: HK$5,307,250 (As of 27 February 2012)

Major wins
- Hong Kong Classic Mile (2010); Hong Kong Mile (2010); Hong Kong Stewards' Cup (2011); Queen's Silver Jubilee Cup (2011)

Brave Kid (Chinese: 勇敢小子; foaled 30 August 2005) is an Australia-born, Hong Kong–based retired Thoroughbred racehorse.

In the 2009–2010 season, Brave Kid recorded sixth consecutive victory and progressed from Class 4 to Group level. He was one of the nominees for the Hong Kong Horse of the Year award.
