= Queen's Silver Jubilee Cup =

The Queen's Silver Jubilee Cup
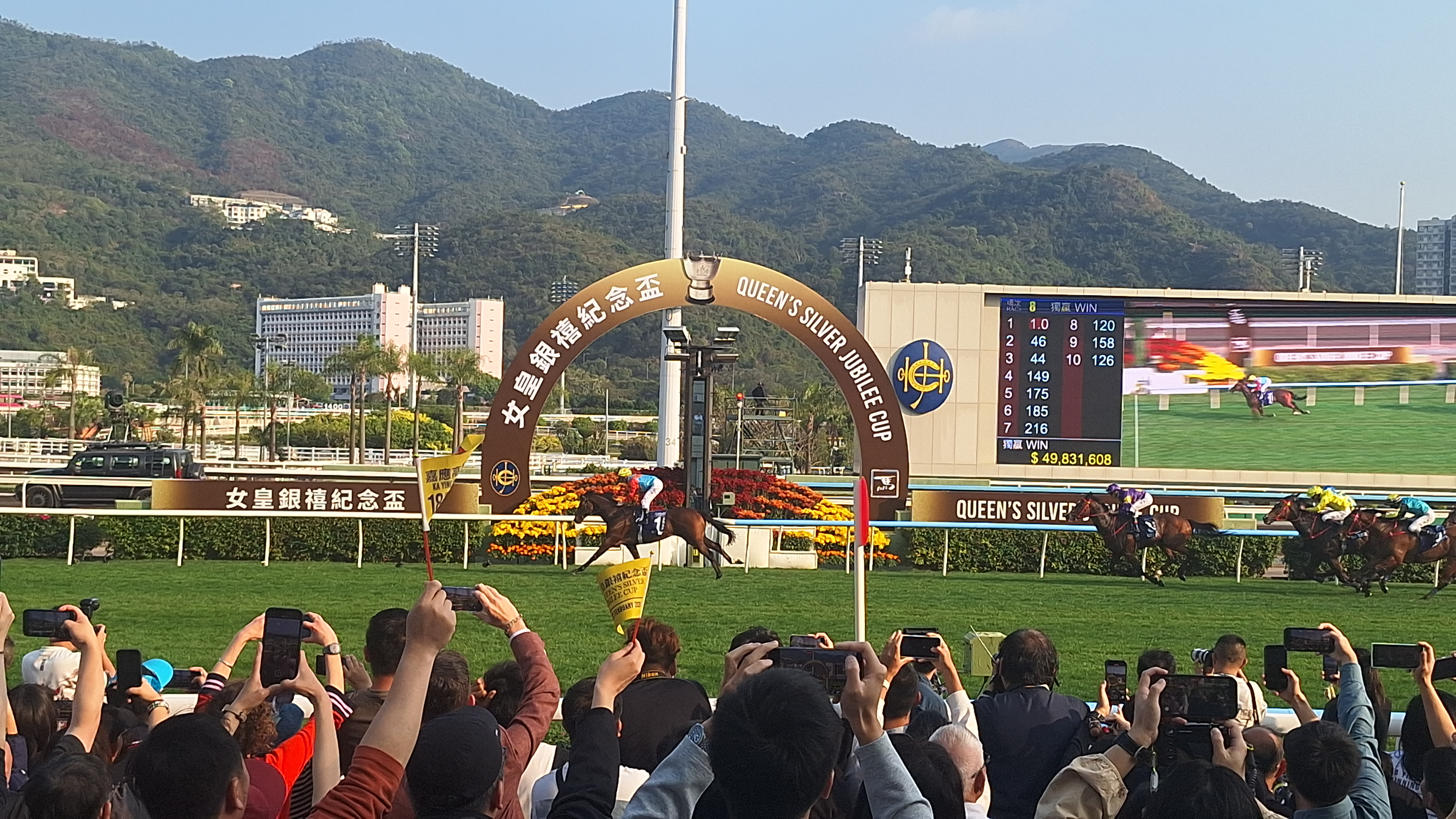
- The Queen's Silver Jubilee Cup 2026 that took place at the Sha Tin Racecourse on 22 February 2026
- Class: Group 1
- Location: Sha Tin Racecourse; Hong Kong
- Inaugurated: 1977
- Race type: Flat / Thoroughbred
- Website: Queen’s Silver Jubilee Cup

Race information
- Distance: 1,400 metres (About 7 furlongs)
- Surface: Turf
- Track: Right-handed
- Qualification: Three-years-old and up
- Weight: 117 lb (3y); 126 lb (4y+); Allowances; 4 lb for fillies and mares 6 lb for N. Hemisphere 3-y-o
- Purse: HK$12,000,000 (2022)

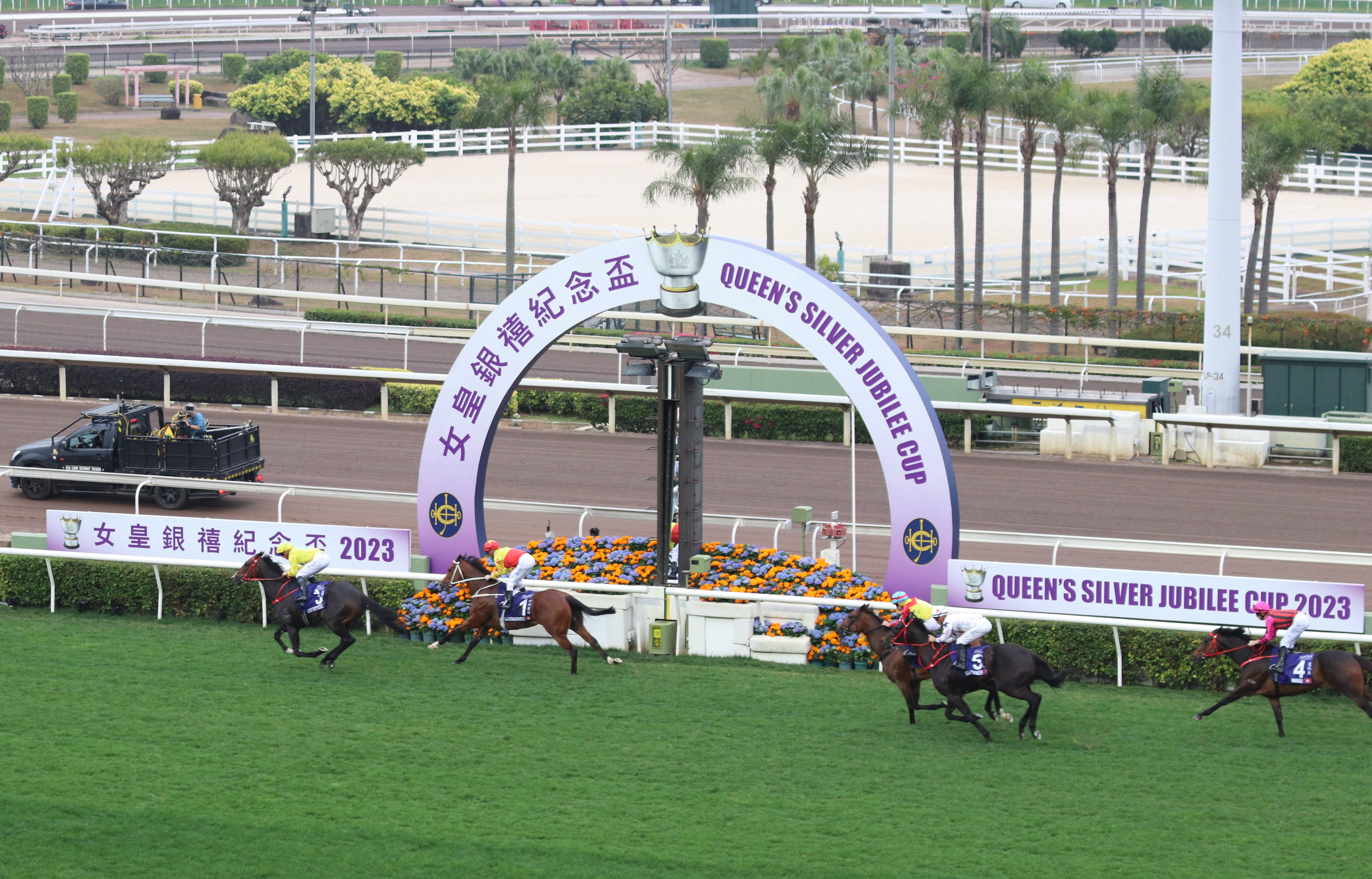
The Queen's Silver Jubilee Cup 2023 that took place at the Sha Tin Racecourse on 19 March 2023

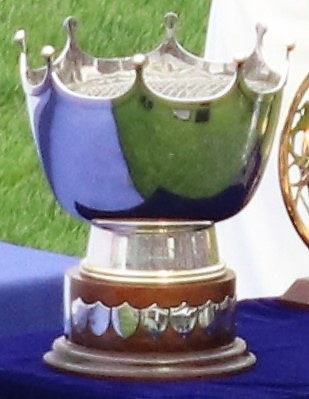
Trophy of the Queen's Silver Jubilee Cup

The Queen's Silver Jubilee Cup is a set weights Group 1 Thoroughbred horse race in Hong Kong, run over 1400 metres, with the total purse of HK$10m in 2014/15, approximately US$1.3m. In the 2005/06 season, it was upgraded to Group 1 status and has since become the final leg of the Hong Kong Speed Series (formerly known as the Champion Sprint Series).

In 2020, Beauty Heritage won the Queen's Silver Jubilee Cup for the third consecutive time.

== Winners since 2006 ==
Year	Winner	Age	Jockey	Trainer	Owner	Time
2006	Joyful Winner	5	Christophe Soumillon	John Moore		1:21.60
2007	Joyful Winner	6	Gérald Mossé	John Moore		1:20.90
2008	Good Ba Ba	6	Olivier Doleuze	Andreas Schütz		1:21.3
2009	Egyptian Ra	7	Felix Coetzee	Tony Cruz		1:21.01
2010	Happy Zero	5	Darren Beadman	John Moore		1:21.83
2011	Beauty Flash	5	Gérald Mossé	Tony Cruz		1:21.74
2012	Lucky Nine	5	Brett Prebble	Caspar Fownes		1:21.30
2013	Ambitious Dragon	6	Zac Purton	Anthony Millard		1:20.63
2014	Gold-Fun	5	Douglas Whyte	Richard Gibson	Pan Sutong	1:21.85
2015	Able Friend	5	João Moreira	John Moore		1:21.10
2016	Contentment	5	Brett Prebble	John Size	Benson Lo Tak Wing	1:21.24
2017	Helene Paragon	5	Tommy Berry	John Moore	Po-shing & Lady Woo, Wilson Woo Ka Wah, Jackson Woo Ka Biu and Dawson Woo Ka Chung	1:21.31
2018	Beauty Generation	5	Zac Purton	John Moore	Patrick Kwok Ho Chuen	1:20.86
2019	Beauty Generation	6	Zac Purton	John Moore	Patrick Kwok Ho Chuen	1:21.03
2020	Beauty Generation	7	Zac Purton	John Moore	Patrick Kwok Ho Chuen	1:21.64
2021	Waikuku	6	João Moreira	John Size	Jocelyn Siu Yang Hin Ting	1:20.78
2022	Wellington	5	Alexis Badel	Richard Gibson	Mr & Mrs Michael Cheng Wing On & Jeffrey Cheng Man Cheong	1:23.53
2023	Lucky Sweynesse	4	James McDonald	Manfred Man Ka-leung	Cheng Ming Leung, Cheng Yu Tung Et Al.	1:21.12
2024	California Spangle	6	Brenton Avdulla	Tony Cruz	The Executors of the Estate of the late Howard Liang Yum Shing	1:22.18
2025	Ka Ying Rising	4	Karis Teetan	David Hayes	Ka Ying Syndicate	1:20.33
2026	Ka Ying Rising	5	Zac Purton	David Hayes	Ka Ying Syndicate	1:19.36

== See also ==
- List of Hong Kong horse races
