= Able Friend =

Australian-bred Thoroughbred racehorse

- Sire: Shamardal
- Grandsire: Giant's Causeway
- Dam: Ponte Piccolo
- Damsire: Volksraad
- Sex: Gelding
- Foaled: 19 September 2009
- Country: Australia
- Colour: Chestnut
- Breeder: Ramsey Pastoral Co Pty Ltd
- Owner: Cornel Li Fook Kwan
- Trainer: John Moore
- Record: 26: 13-5-4
- Earnings: HK$61,333,624

Major wins
- Hong Kong Classic Mile (2014); Chairman's Trophy (2014, 2015); Jockey Club Mile (2014); Hong Kong Mile (2014); Hong Kong Stewards' Cup (2015); Queen's Silver Jubilee Cup (2015); Champions Mile (2015); Premier Bowl (2015)

Awards
- Hong Kong Horse of the Year (2015); Hong Kong Most Popular Horse of the Year (2015); Hong Kong Champion Miler (2015)

Able Friend (Chinese: 步步友: foaled 19 September 2009) is an Australian-bred, Hong Kong-trained Thoroughbred racehorse. After showing some promise when winning one of his two races in his native country, the gelding was transferred to race in Hong Kong in 2013. In the 2013/2014 season he established himself as one of the best milers in Hong Kong with four wins including the Hong Kong Classic Mile and the Chairman's Trophy from seven races. In the following season his wins in the Jockey Club Mile (2014) and Hong Kong Mile saw him rated among the best racehorses in the world. His International Rating of 127 made him the highest internationally rated Hong Kong racehorse ever. He was crowned as the Hong Kong Horse of the Year in 2015.

== Background ==
Able Friend is a chestnut gelding with a white sock on his left hind leg bred in Australia by Stuart Ramsey's Ramsey Pastoral Co Pty Ltd. He was sired by the Godolphin stallion Shamardal who won six of his seven races in Europe, including four Group One races. On his retirement from racing he became a "shuttle" stallion standing in Ireland for part of the year before moving to Australia for the southern hemisphere breeding season: his progeny have included Mukhadram, Lope de Vega, Dan Excel (Singapore Airlines International Cup) and Casamento (Racing Post Trophy). Able Friend's dam Ponte Piccolo was a successful racemare who won the Keith F Nolan Classic in 2005. She was a great-granddaughter of the Irish-bred broodmare Royal News, whose other descendants have included Hit The Roof (Victoria Derby) and Ivory's Irish (Australian Derby). Able Friend is an unusually large racehorse, with a peak racing weight of 1315 pounds (596 kg), and is nicknamed "Elephant" by his stable staff.

In 2011, Able Friend was sent to the Inglis Australian Easter Yearling Sale and was bought for A$550,000 by George Moore, the son of the leading Hong Kong trainer John Moore.

== Racing career ==
=== 2012/2013: three-year-old season ===
In the autumn of 2012, Able Friend began his racing career in Australia by finishing second to Balzac at Rosehill Racecourse, and then recorded his first victory when taking a maiden race at Wyong on 22 November. In January 2013 he was sent to race in Hong Kong where he was trained by John Moore and owned by Dr & Mrs Cornel Li Fook Kwan. On his Hong Kong debut he carried 125 pounds and defeated thirteen opponents in a 1200-metre handicap race at Sha Tin on 8 June.

=== 2013/2014: four-year-old season ===
Able Friend began his first full season in Hong Kong by finishing third in a handicap on 12 October, and then recorded wins in handicaps over 1400 metres in November and 1600 metres in December. In January the gelding was stepped up in class for the Group 1 Hong Kong Classic Mile. Ridden by João Moreira, he was made the odds-on favourite and won by half a length from the Irish import Designs On Rome. After the race Moore said "This was the best Classic Mile field that I’ve seen since I’ve been in Hong Kong, and from that point of view, I think I’ve got the real deal on my hands; I believe he'll be one of Hong Kong's leading lights in the future" whilst Moreira commented that the winner "could possibly be the best horse I have ridden".

Able Friend finished second to Designs On Rome over longer distances in his next two starts, being beaten one and a half lengths by his rival in the Hong Kong Classic Cup and by half a length in the Hong Kong Derby. He was then dropped in class and distance in April for the Group 2 Chairman's Trophy in which the Mauritian jockey Karis Teetan deputised for the suspended Moreira. After Able Friend won the race by beating Packing Whiz and three others, Moore suggested that the horse might be sent to Royal Ascot for the Queen Anne Stakes. On his final appearance of the Hong Kong season Able Friend started as the 7/10 favourite for the Champions Mile ahead of a field which included California Memory, Gold-Fun, Dan Excel and Gordon Lord Byron. He proved the best of the locally trained runners but was not able to beat the South African challenger Variety Club, finishing second four lengths behind the winner.

=== 2014/2015: five-year-old season ===
Able Friend was dropped back to sprint distances for his seasonal debut as his preparation race, at which he finished fourth to Aerovelocity when carrying 133 pounds in the 1200 metre handicap on 26 October. The gelding prepared for the Hong Kong Mile with a run in the Jockey Club Mile on 23 November. He started the odds-on favourite and won by two and a quarter lengths from Gold-Fun with Ambitious Dragon in third. The Hong Kong Jockey Club's report on the race likened Able Friend's dismissal of his opponents as resembling "a lion swatting flies".

On the 14th of December, Able Friend started the 4/6 favourite for the 24th running of the Hong Kong Mile. The ten-runner field included Grand Prix Boss (NHK Mile Cup), Hana's Goal (All Aged Stakes) and World Ace from Japan, while Britain was represented by Trade Storm (Woodbine Mile) and Captain Cat (Superior Mile). The locally trained opposition to the favourite was headed by Gold-Fun and Glorious Days. In the early stages Able Friend raced towards the rear of the field before being switched to the outside 400 metres out. He took the lead 200 metres from the finish and drew away to win by four and a quarter lengths from Gold-Fun with Grand Prix Boss in third. Following the race, Moore said "He's phenomenal. He's got that turn of foot and can relax and not waste energy, then he explodes when you show him daylight. I've got one of the best milers on the planet and we'll go for the Stewards' Cup and I'll try to convince the owner to go for the Duty Free."

On the 25th of January, Able Friend started 1/4 favourite for the Stewards' Cup against a field which included Gold-Fun, Ambitious Dragon, Blazing Speed and Glorious Days. He was held up by Moreira before making rapid progress in the straight and won by one and a half lengths from Beauty Flame. After the race, Moore described the gelding as the best horse he had ever trained, ahead of Viva Pataca but admitted that "he's got to go overseas to prove himself". In March, Able Friend added a victory in the 1400 metre Queen's Silver Jubilee Cup despite being boxed in on the rail until the closing stages. On 7 April Able Friend took his winning run to five when he won the Chairman's Trophy for the second time. The gelding then started 1/4 favourite for the Champions Mile and won "very easily" from Rewarding Hero and Dan Excel. It was described as 'an absolute hand canter.' On his final appearance of the season, Able Friend was sent to Europe to contest the Queen Anne Stakes at Royal Ascot. He sweated badly and did not show his usual calm demeanour before the race and was never in contention, finishing sixth of the eight runners behind the French gelding Solow.

=== 2015/2016: six-year-old season ===
Able Friend was off the course for four months before returning in the Premier Bowl at Sha Tin on the 25th of October. Carrying top weight over six furlongs he came from last to first in the closing stages to win by half a length from Gold-Fun. He then raced in the Jockey Club Mile as a prep race for the Hong Kong Mile, but he disappointed by finishing only third. This raised speculations whether Able Friend could return to his best in the Hong Kong Mile on December 13th. In that race, he had to face the challenge of the Japanese contingent Maurice, who won the Yasuda Kinen and the Mile Championship. Therefore, the race has been built up as the battle for the crown of 'Asia's best miler'. Able Friend was found lame with a sore right hoof that morning, but was allowed to run after further examinations by the vets. He went past Maurice early in the straight, but he did not sustain his run and Maurice fought back to win the race, with Able Friend finishing third behind Giant Treasure. It was reported on January 7th that Able Friend suffered a rare tendon injury associated with the aforementioned lameness in his right front foot. "He went into the Hong Kong Mile with a bruised sole, we kept him in minor work and the problem didn't resolve itself, " his trainer John Moore said, when he announced that his horse was sidelined for the rest of the season. The horse was sent to a property in Australia on the Mornington Peninsula for rehabilitation.

=== 2016/17: seven-year-old season ===
Able Friend made his first start in the season in the Jockey Club Sprint, finishing fourth. He would fail to win his next three starts in the season before being scratched from the Class 1 Ambitious Dragon Handicap with a lame right fore. His retirement was announced two months later on the 25th of May, the horse returning to Australia to Turangga Farm where he was born.

== Assessment ==
Following his win in the Hong Kong Mile, the Racing Post rated Able Friend the fifth-best racehorse in the world, equal with Treve and behind only Just A Way, Australia, Shared Belief and Kingman. In the 2014 World's Best Racehorse Rankings, Able Friend was rated the third-best horse to race anywhere in the world in 2014 behind the Japanese horses Just A Way and Epiphaneia and level with Australia, Kingman, The Grey Gatsby and Variety Club.

== Pedigree ==
Pedigree of Able Friend (AUS), chestnut gelding, 2009
Sire Shamardal (USA) 2002	Giant's Causeway (USA); 1997	Storm Cat	Storm Bird
Sire Shamardal (USA) 2002	Giant's Causeway (USA); 1997	Storm Cat	Terlingua
Sire Shamardal (USA) 2002	Giant's Causeway (USA); 1997	Mariah's Storm	Rahy
Sire Shamardal (USA) 2002	Giant's Causeway (USA); 1997	Mariah's Storm	Immense
Sire Shamardal (USA) 2002	Helsinki (GB); 1993	Machiavellian	Mr. Prospector
Sire Shamardal (USA) 2002	Helsinki (GB); 1993	Machiavellian	Coup de Folie
Sire Shamardal (USA) 2002	Helsinki (GB); 1993	Helen Street	Troy
Sire Shamardal (USA) 2002	Helsinki (GB); 1993	Helen Street	Waterway
Dam Ponte Piccolo (NZ) 2001	Volksraad (GB); 1988	Green Desert	Danzig
Dam Ponte Piccolo (NZ) 2001	Volksraad (GB); 1988	Green Desert	Foreign Courier
Dam Ponte Piccolo (NZ) 2001	Volksraad (GB); 1988	Celtic Assembly	Secretariat
Dam Ponte Piccolo (NZ) 2001	Volksraad (GB); 1988	Celtic Assembly	Welsh Garden
Dam Ponte Piccolo (NZ) 2001	Baronia (NZ); 1985	Half Iced	Hatchet Man
Dam Ponte Piccolo (NZ) 2001	Baronia (NZ); 1985	Half Iced	Winter Memory
Dam Ponte Piccolo (NZ) 2001	Baronia (NZ); 1985	Barron Fey	Scottish Rifle
Dam Ponte Piccolo (NZ) 2001	Baronia (NZ); 1985	Barron Fey	Royal News (Family 13-a)
