= Hong Kong Classic Mile =

Horse race

The Hong Kong Classic Mile is a domestic Group 1 four year old set weights Thoroughbred horse race in Hong Kong, run over a distance of 1600 metres. It was originally a Group 3 race and was the traditional lead-up race for the Hong Kong Derby. In the season of 1999/2000, this race was upgraded to domestic Group 1 status. Now, it is the first of the three major races for the Hong Kong classic generation.

== Winners ==
Year	Winner	Age	Jockey	Trainer	Time
1980	Super Plentiful		Tony Cruz	Ng Chi-lam	1:23.40
1981	Gilgit		Gary W. Moore	George Moore	1:22.80
1983	Gay Eighty		Brian Taylor	Derek Cheng Tai-chee	1:36.90
1983	Silver Surf		Pat Eddery	Bruce Hutchison	1:38.30
1985	Gay Hundred		Brent Thomson	Derek Cheng Tai-chee	1:37.20
1986	Distinction		Gary W. Moore	John Moore	1:35.20
1987	Gold Belt		Willie Ryan	Brian Kan Ping-chee	1:35.60
1988	Royal Sovereign		Peter Leyshan	Gordon Smyth	1:37.10
1989	Gerrnas		Tony Cruz	Lam Hung-fei	1:51.70
1990	Zaitech		Walter Swinburn	Brian Kan Ping-chee	1:52.40
1991	Greenmail		Noel Barker	John Moore	1:37.00
1992	Sound Print		Mick Kinane	Brian Kan Ping-chee	1:36.90
1993	Happy Guy		Tony Cruz	Brian Kan Ping-chee	1:35.30
1994	Sterling Town		Lester Piggott	Ivan Allan	1:37.00
1995	Bogie's Pride		Darryll Holland	Tony Chan Pak-hung	1:35.40
1996	Mr Vitality		Basil Marcus	Ivan Allan	1:35.30
1997	Smart Kid		Piere Strydom	Alex Wong Siu-tan	1:36.00
1998	Johan Cruyff		Éric Legrix	Patrick Biancone	1:34.40
1999	Resfa		Basil Marcus	David Hayes	1:34.80
2000	Industrialist		Jimmy Ting Koon-ho	Brian Kan Ping-chee	1:36.30
2001	Charming City	4	Shane Dye	David Hayes	1:34.50
2002	Olympic Express	4	Weichong Marwing	Ivan Allan	1:34.90
2003	Self Flit	4	Eddy Lai Wai-ming	Ivan Allan	1:35.10
2004	Tiber	4	Douglas Whyte	John Moore	1:34.40
2005	Scintillation	4	Gérald Mossé	Danny Shum Chap-shing	1:36.10
2006	Sunny Sing	4	Eric Saint-Martin	John Moore	1:34.80
2007	Floral Pegasus	4	Gérald Mossé	Tony Cruz	1:34.60
2008	Helene Mascot	4	Felix Coetzee	Tony Cruz	1:34.30
2009	Thumbs Up	4	Christophe Soumillon	Danny Shum Chap-shing	1:35.65
2010	Beauty Flash	4	Christophe Soumillon	Tony Cruz	1:34.39
2011	Lucky Nine	4	Brett Prebble	Caspar Fownes	1:34.25
2012	Sweet Orange	4	Weichong Marwing	David Ferraris	1:37.64
2013	Gold-Fun	4	Douglas Whyte	Richard Gibson	1:34.27
2014	Able Friend	4	João Moreira	John Moore	1:33.43
2015	Beauty Only	4	Neil Callan	Tony Cruz	1:33.95
2016	Sun Jewellery	4	Ryan Moore	John Size	1:35.05
2017	Rapper Dragon	4	João Moreira	John Moore	1:34.98
2018	Nothingilikemore	4	João Moreira	John Size	1:34.24
2019	Furore	4	Hugh Bowman	Frankie Lor Fu-chuen	1:34.28
2020	Golden Sixty	4	Vincent Ho Chak-yiu	Francis Lui Kin-wai	1:33.61
2021	Excellent Proposal	4	Blake Shinn	John Size	1:33.81
2022	Romantic Warrior	4	Karis Teetan	Danny Shum Chap-shing	1:33.80
2023	Voyage Bubble	4	Jamie Kah	Ricky Yiu Poon-fai	1:34.58
2024	Helios Express	4	Hugh Bowman	John Size	1:34.44
2025	My Wish	4	Luke Ferraris	Mark Newnham	1:33.98
2026	Little Paradise	4	Vincent Ho Chak-yiu	Jimmy Ting Koon-ho	1:33.31

== See also ==
- List of Hong Kong horse races
