= Centenary Sprint Cup =

The Centenary Sprint Cup
- Class: Group 1
- Location: Sha Tin Racecourse; Hong Kong
- Inaugurated: 1984
- Race type: Flat / Thoroughbred
- Website: Centenary Sprint Cup

Race information
- Distance: 1,200 metres (About 6 furlongs)
- Surface: Turf
- Track: Right-handed
- Qualification: Three-years-old and up
- Weight: 119 lb (3y); 126 lb (4y+); Allowances; 4 lb for fillies and mares 4 lb for N. Hemisphere 3-y-o
- Purse: HK$12,000,000 (2022)

The Centenary Sprint Cup is a Hong Kong Group 1 Thoroughbred horse race over a distance of 1200 metres at Sha Tin in January. It was originally known as the Centenary Cup, which was first run on 24 November 1984 to celebrate the centenary of The Hong Kong Jockey Club. It offers a purse of HK$10,000,000.

In the season of 2005/06, it becomes the first leg of the Hong Kong Speed Series (formerly the Champion Sprint Series). In the 2017/2018 season, the race was promoted to Group 1 status.

== Winners ==
Year	Winner	Age	Jockey	Trainer	Time
2001	King Of Danes	3	Felix Coetzee	Tony Cruz	55.80
2002	Firebolt	4	Frankie Dettori	Ivan Allan	57.00
2003	Grand Delight	5	Shane Dye	John Size	56.70
2004	Silent Witness	4	Felix Coetzee	Tony Cruz	56.20
2005	Silent Witness	5	Felix Coetzee	Tony Cruz	56.70
2006	Scintillation	5	Eric Saint-Martin	Danny Shum Chap-shing	56.30
2007	Scintillation	6	Eric Saint-Martin	Danny Shum Chap-shing	56.40
2008	Absolute Champion	6	Brett Prebble	David Hall	56.50
2009	Inspiration	5	Gerald Mosse	John Moore	56.91
2010	Sacred Kingdom	6	Brett Prebble	Ricky Yiu Poon-fai	55.37
2011	Sacred Kingdom	7	Brett Prebble	Ricky Yiu Poon-fai	56.52
2012	Eagle Regiment	4	Olivier Doleuze	Manfred Man Ka-leung	57.05
2013	Eagle Regiment	5	Olivier Doleuze	Manfred Man Ka-leung	56.32
2014	Amber Sky	4	João Moreira	Ricky Yiu Poon-fai	55.86
2015	Peniaphobia	4	Douglas Whyte	Tony Cruz	55.49
2016	Aerovelocity	7	Zac Purton	Paul O'Sullivan	1:08.36
2017	Peniaphobia	6	Neil Callan	Tony Cruz	1:09.15
2018	D B Pin	5	Olivier Doleuze	John Size	1:09.64
2019	Beat The Clock	5	João Moreira	John Size	1:08.42
2020	Beat The Clock	6	João Moreira	John Size	1:08.57
2021	Hot King Prawn	6	João Moreira	John Size	1:08.01
2022	Stronger	5	Vincent Ho Chak-yiu	Douglas Whyte	1:08.78
2023	Lucky Sweynesse	4	Zac Purton	Manfred Man Ka-leung	1:08.12
2024	Victor The Winner	5	Derek Leung Ka-chun	Danny Shum Chap-shing	1:09.43
2025	Ka Ying Rising	4	Zac Purton	David Hayes	1:07.20
2026	Ka Ying Rising	5	Zac Purton	David Hayes	1:07.66

== See also ==
- List of Hong Kong horse races
