= Ka Ying Rising =

New Zealand born and Hong Kong trained thoroughbred racehorse

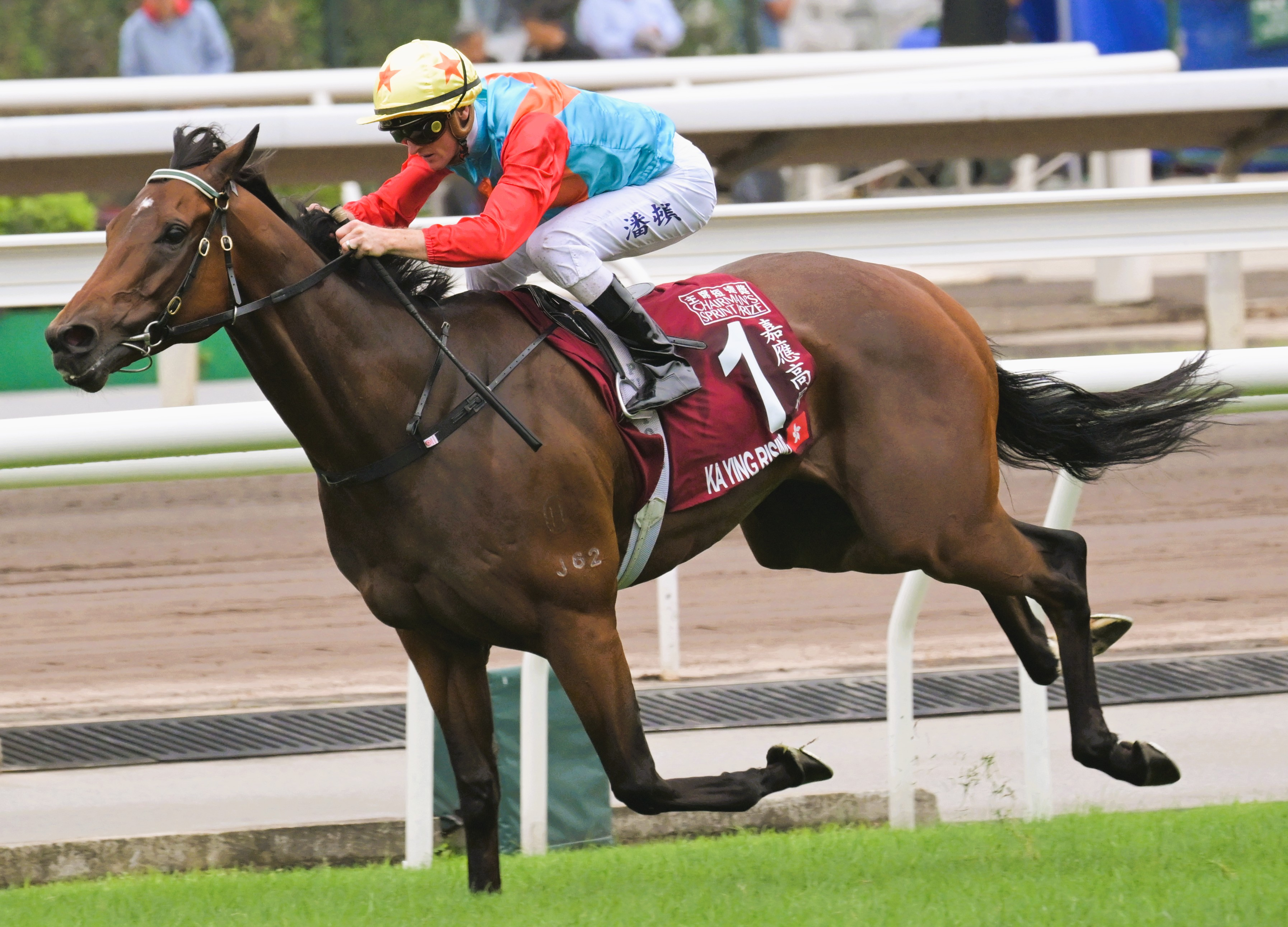
- Ka Ying Rising winning Chairman's Sprint Prize 2025
- Sire: Shamexpress (NZ)
- Grandsire: O'Reilly (NZ)
- Dam: Missy Moo (NZ)
- Damsire: Per Incanto (USA)
- Sex: Gelding
- Foaled: 3 September 2020
- Country: New Zealand
- Colour: Bay
- Breeder: Fraser Auret, Grandmoral Lodge Racing
- Owner: 1. Grandmoral Lodge Racing; 2. Ka Ying Syndicate
- Trainer: David A. Hayes
- Jockey: Zac Purton
- Record: 26: 23–3–0
- Earnings: HK$160,923,900

Major wins
- Sha Tin Vase (2024); Chief Executive's Cup (2024, 2025, 2026); Premier Bowl (2024); Jockey Club Sprint (2024, 2025, 2026); Hong Kong Sprint (2024, 2025); Centenary Sprint Cup (2025, 2026); Queen's Silver Jubilee Cup (2025, 2026); Sprint Cup (2025, 2026); Chairman's Sprint Prize (2025, 2026); The Everest (2025)

Awards
- Hong Kong Champion Griffin (2024); Hong Kong Most Improved Horse (2024); Hong Kong Champion Four-Year-Old (2025); Hong Kong Champion Sprinter (2025 & 2026); Hong Kong Horse of the Year (2025 & 2026)

Honours
- World Champion Sprinter (2024 & 2025); Timeform rating: 137

Ka Ying Rising (Chinese: 嘉應高昇, foaled 3 September 2020), previously named Mr Express, is a champion Thoroughbred racehorse born in New Zealand and trained in Hong Kong. He is the holder of HK's longest winning streak in history (21 races), including winning multiple Group 1 races.

He was bred by Fraser Auret in Marton in the Rangitikei district of the Manawatū-Whanganui region of New Zealand's North Island. Auret had trained the dam Missy Moo to win five races. Missy Moo was served by the Windsor Park Stud stallion Shamexpress. He was sold to clients of the trainer David Hayes and exported to Australia on 28 March 2023. After trialing he was sent to Hong Kong to commence his racing career.

== Racing career ==
Notable wins by Ka Ying Rising include:

- 2 June 2024 – Sha Tin Vase (Group 3, 1200m), ridden by Karis Teetan, beating Flying Ace and Howdeepisyourlove.
- 20 October 2024 – Premier Bowl (Group 2, 1200m), Zac Purton, beating Helios Express and California Spangle.
- 17 November 2024 – The Bochk Private Banking Jockey Cup Sprint (Group 2, 1200m), Zac Purton, beating Howdeepisyourlove and Helios Express.
- 8 December 2024 – The Longines Hong Kong Sprint (Group 1, 1200m), Zac Purton, beating Helios Express and Satono Reve.
- 19 January 2025 – Centenary Sprint Cup (G1, 1200m), Zac Purton, beating Helios Express and Howdeepisyourlove. Time: 1:07:20, New Sha Tin 1200m Record.
- 23 February 2025 – Queen's Silver Jubilee Cup (Group 1, 1400m), Karis Teetan, beating Helios Express and Howdeepisyourlove.
- 30 March 2025 – The Sprint Cup (Group 2, 1200m), Zac Purton, beating Helios Express and Lucky With You.
- 27 April 2025 – Chairman's Sprint Prize (Group 1, 1200m), Zac Purton, beating Satono Reve and Helios Express.
- 18 October 2025 – The Everest (Group 1, 1200m, Royal Randwick), Zac Purton, beating Tempted and Jimmysstar. He is the first overseas runner to win The Everest.
- 23 November 2025 – The Bochk Private Banking Jockey Cup Sprint (Group 2, 1200m), Zac Purton, beating Fast Network and Helios Express.
- 14 December 2025 – The Longines Hong Kong Sprint (Group 1, 1200m), Zac Purton, beating Raging Blizzard and Fast Network.
- 25 January 2026 – Centenary Sprint Cup (Group 1, 1200m), Zac Purton, beating Helios Express and Lucky With You.
- 22 February 2026 - Queen's Silver Jubilee Cup (Group 1, 1400m), Zac Purton, beating Helios Express and Lucky Sweynesse. Time: 1:19:36, New Sha Tin 1400m Record.
- 26 April 2026 - Chairman's Sprint Prize (Group 1, 1200m), Zac Purton, beating Satono Reve and Raging Blizzard. Time: 1:07.1, New Sha Tin 1200m Record.
- 6 September 2026 - HKSAR Chief Executive's Cup (Group 3, 1200m), Zac Purton, beating Copartner Prance and Magic Control. Time: 1:06.11, New Sha Tin 1200m Record.

In the Longines 2024 World's Best Racehorse Rankings, Ka Ying Rising was rated =24 on a ranking of 121. Ka Ying Rising was rated the equal World's top ranked sprinter for 2024.

In the Longines 2025 World's Best Racehorse Rankings, Ka Ying Rising had an increase of 2 (between the 9th November rankings and the 20th January rankings), to a rating of 128. He would be places 2nd in a 5 way tie between USA's Sovereignty, Ireland's Ombudsman, and Japan's Forever Young (Breeders Cup Classic, Saudi Cup) and Masquerade Ball (Autumn Tenno Sho Win, 2nd in Japan Cup), all of them being behind Calandagan (Grand Prix de Saint-Cloud, King George VI and Queen Elizabeth Stakes, Champion Stakes and Japan Cup wins), being ranked first with a rating of 130.

== Racing statistics ==
Date	Race	Track	Class	Distance (Condition)	Weight (lbs)	Result	Time	Winning (Losing) Margin	Jockey	Winner (2nd Place)	Ref
2023-24 season – Three-year-old season
3 Dec 2023	Hankow Handicap	Sha Tin	C4	Turf 1200 m (Good)	127	1st	1:09.48	2 3/4 lengths	Zac Purton	(Strathpeffer)	
1 Jan 2024	Cherry Handicap	Sha Tin	C3	Turf 1200 m (Good)	118	2nd	1:09.12	(nose)	Zac Purton	Wunderbar	
21 Jan 2024	Bennet’s Hill Handicap	Sha Tin	C3	Turf 1200 m (Good)	122	2nd	1:08.95	(short head)	Zac Purton	Wunderbar	
12 Feb 2024	Prosperity Handicap	Sha Tin	C3	Turf 1200 m (Good)	129	1st	1:08.95	neck	Zac Purton	(Lady’s Choice)	
24 Mar 2024	Whether Handicap	Sha Tin	C3	Turf 1200 m (Good to Firm)	135	1st	1:08.19	1 1/2 lengths	Zac Purton	(Call Me Glorious)	
5 May 2024	Brandy Snap Handicap	Sha Tin	C2	Turf 1200 m (Good)	119	1st	1:08.81	2 1/2 lengths	Zac Purton	(Packing Treadmill)	
2 Jun 2024	Sha Tin Vase	Sha Tin	G3	Turf 1200 m (Good to Firm)	115	1st	1:08.00	1 1/4 lengths	Karis Teetan	(Flying Ace)	
2024-25 season – Four-year-old season
8 Sep 2024	Chief Executive’s Cup	Sha Tin	C1	Turf 1200 m (Good to Yielding)	135	1st	R1:08.03	1 1/4 lengths	Zac Purton	(Beauty Waves)	
20 Oct 2024	Premier Bowl	Sha Tin	G2	Turf 1200 m (Good to Firm)	128	1st	1:07.57	1 1/2 lengths	Zac Purton	(Helios Express)	
17 Nov 2024	Jockey Club Sprint	Sha Tin	G2	Turf 1200 m (Good)	123	1st	R1:07.43	3 1/4 lengths	Zac Purton	(Howdeepisyourlove)	
8 Dec 2024	Hong Kong Sprint	Sha Tin	G1	Turf 1200 m (Good)	126	1st	1:08.15	1/2 length	Zac Purton	(Helios Express)	
19 Jan 2025	Centenary Sprint Cup	Sha Tin	G1	Turf 1200 m (Good)	126	1st	R1:07.20	3 1/4 lengths	Zac Purton	(Helios Express)	
23 Feb 2025	Queen's Silver Jubilee Cup	Sha Tin	G1	Turf 1400 m (Good)	126	1st	R1:20.33	1 1/2 lengths	Karis Teetan	(Helios Express)	
30 Mar 2025	Sprint Cup	Sha Tin	G2	Turf 1200 m (Good)	128	1st	1:08.18	3 lengths	Zac Purton	(Helios Express)	
27 Apr 2025	Chairman's Sprint Prize	Sha Tin	G1	Turf 1200 m (Good)	126	1st	R1:07.88	2 1/4 lengths	Zac Purton	(Satono Reve)	
2025-26 season – Five-year-old season
7 Sep 2025	Chief Executive’s Cup	Sha Tin	C1	Turf 1200 m (Good)	135	1st	R1:07.63	2 1/4 lengths	Zac Purton	(Lucky Sweynesse)	
18 Oct 2025	The Everest	Randwick	G1	Turf 1200 m (Good)	129	1st	1:08.13	1 1/4 lengths	Zac Purton	(Tempted)	
23 Nov 2025	Jockey Club Sprint	Sha Tin	G2	Turf 1200 m (Good to Firm)	128	1st	R1:07.33	2 3/4 lengths	Zac Purton	(Fast Network)	
14 Dec 2025	Hong Kong Sprint	Sha Tin	G1	Turf 1200 m (Good)	126	1st	R1:07.70	3 3/4 lengths	Zac Purton	(Raging Blizzard)	
25 Jan 2026	Centenary Sprint Cup	Sha Tin	G1	Turf 1200 m (Good to Firm)	126	1st	1:07.66	1 1/4 lengths	Zac Purton	(Helios Express)	
22 Feb 2026	Queen's Silver Jubilee Cup	Sha Tin	G1	Turf 1400 m (Good)	126	1st	R1:19.36	3 1/2 lengths	Zac Purton	(Helios Express)	
6 Apr 2026	Sprint Cup	Sha Tin	G2	Turf 1200 m (Good)	128	1st	R1:07.12	4 1/4 lengths	Zac Purton	(Helios Express)	
26 Apr 2026	Chairman's Sprint Prize	Sha Tin	G1	Turf 1200 m (Good to Firm)	126	1st	R1:07.10	4 1/4 lengths	Zac Purton	(Satono Reve)	
2026-27 season – Six-year-old season
6 Sep 2026	Chief Executive's Cup	Sha Tin	G3	Turf 1200 m (Good)	135	1st	R1:06.11	7 3/4 lengths	Zac Purton	(Copartner Prance)	
17 Oct 2026	The Everest	Randwick	G1	Turf 1200 m (Soft)	129	2nd	1:08.25	(neck)	Zac Purton	Tempted	
22 Nov 2026	Jockey Club Sprint	Sha Tin	G2	Turf 1200 m (Good)	128	1st	1:07.93	3 3/4 lengths	Zac Purton	(Raging Blizzard)	

R in the chart and the time written in red indicates the horse finished in record time.

== Pedigree ==
Pedigree of Ka Ying Rising (NZ)
Sire Shamexpress (NZ) 2009	O'Reilly (NZ); 1993	Last Tycoon	Try My Best
Sire Shamexpress (NZ) 2009	O'Reilly (NZ); 1993	Last Tycoon	Mill Princess
Sire Shamexpress (NZ) 2009	O'Reilly (NZ); 1993	Courtza	Pompeii Court
Sire Shamexpress (NZ) 2009	O'Reilly (NZ); 1993	Courtza	Hunza
Sire Shamexpress (NZ) 2009	Volkrose (NZ); 2002	Volksraad	Green Desert
Sire Shamexpress (NZ) 2009	Volkrose (NZ); 2002	Volksraad	Celtic Assembly
Sire Shamexpress (NZ) 2009	Volkrose (NZ); 2002	Rose World	Grosvenor
Sire Shamexpress (NZ) 2009	Volkrose (NZ); 2002	Rose World	Geraniums Red
Dam Missy Moo (NZ) 2012	Per Incanto (USA); 2004	Street Cry	Machiavellian
Dam Missy Moo (NZ) 2012	Per Incanto (USA); 2004	Street Cry	Helen Street
Dam Missy Moo (NZ) 2012	Per Incanto (USA); 2004	Pappa Realle	Indian Ridge
Dam Missy Moo (NZ) 2012	Per Incanto (USA); 2004	Pappa Realle	Daffodil Fields
Dam Missy Moo (NZ) 2012	Royal Rhythm (NZ); 1998	Rhythm	Mr Prospector
Dam Missy Moo (NZ) 2012	Royal Rhythm (NZ); 1998	Rhythm	Dance Number
Dam Missy Moo (NZ) 2012	Royal Rhythm (NZ); 1998	Her Dynasty	Sir Tristram
Dam Missy Moo (NZ) 2012	Royal Rhythm (NZ); 1998	Her Dynasty	Taiona
