= List of Hong Kong horse races =

A list of notable flat horse races which take place annually in Hong Kong, under the authority of Hong Kong Jockey Club, including all conditions races which currently hold Group 1, 2 or 3 status.

== Group 1 ==
Month	Race Name	Racecourse	Dist. (m)	Age/Sex
January	Stewards' Cup	Sha Tin	1,600	3yo+
January	Centenary Sprint Cup	Sha Tin	1,200	3yo+
February	Hong Kong Gold Cup	Sha Tin	2,000	3yo+
February	Queen's Silver Jubilee Cup	Sha Tin	1,400	3yo+
April	Queen Elizabeth II Cup	Sha Tin	2,000	3yo+
April	Champions Mile	Sha Tin	1,600	3yo+
April	Chairman's Sprint Prize	Sha Tin	1,200	3yo+
May	Champions & Chater Cup	Sha Tin	2,400	3yo+
December	Hong Kong Sprint	Sha Tin	1,200	3yo+
December	Hong Kong Mile	Sha Tin	1,600	3yo+
December	Hong Kong Vase	Sha Tin	2,400	3yo+
December	Hong Kong Cup	Sha Tin	2,000	3yo+

== Group 2 ==
Month	Race Name	Racecourse	Dist. (m)	Age/Sex
April	Sprint Cup	Sha Tin	1,200	3yo+
April	Chairman's Trophy	Sha Tin	1,600	3yo+
October	Premier Bowl	Sha Tin	1,200	3yo+
October	Sha Tin Trophy	Sha Tin	1,600	3yo+
November	Jockey Club Cup	Sha Tin	2,000	3yo+
November	Jockey Club Mile	Sha Tin	1,600	3yo+
November	Jockey Club Sprint	Sha Tin	1,200	3yo+

== Group 3 ==
Month	Race Name	Racecourse	Dist. (m)	Age/Sex
January	Chinese Club Challenge Cup	Sha Tin	1,400	3yo+
January	Bauhinia Sprint Trophy	Sha Tin	1,000	3yo+
January	January Cup	Happy Valley	1,800	3yo+
February	Centenary Vase	Sha Tin	1,800	3yo+
May	Queen Mother Memorial Cup	Sha Tin	2,400	3yo+
May	Sha Tin Vase	Sha Tin	1,200	3yo+
June	Lion Rock Trophy	Sha Tin	1,600	3yo+
June	Premier Cup	Sha Tin	1,400	3yo+
June	Premier Plate	Sha Tin	1,800	3yo+
September	HKSAR Chief Executive's Cup	Sha Tin	1,200	3yo+
October	National Day Cup	Sha Tin	1,000	3yo+
October	Celebration Cup	Sha Tin	1,400	3yo+
November	Ladies' Purse	Sha Tin	1,800	3yo+

== Other races ==
Month	Race Name	Racecourse	Dist. (m)	Age/Sex
January	Hong Kong Classic Mile	Sha Tin	1,600	4yo
February	Hong Kong Classic Cup	Sha Tin	1,800	4yo
March	Hong Kong Derby	Sha Tin	2,000	4yo
