= Little Bridge =

New Zealand-bred Thoroughbred racehorse

- Sire: Faltaat (USA)
- Grandsire: Mr. Prospector (USA)
- Dam: Golden Rose (NZ)
- Damsire: Gold Brose (AUS)
- Sex: Gelding
- Foaled: 2006
- Died: 2014
- Country: New Zealand
- Colour: Bay
- Breeder: Llanhennock Trust (NZ)
- Owner: Ko Kam Piu
- Trainer: Danny C. S. Shum
- Record: 22:10-2-1
- Earnings: HK$13,674,540

Major wins
- Chinese Club Challenge Cup (2011); Jockey Club Sprint (2011); Bauhinia Sprint Trophy (2012); The Sprint Cup (2012); King's Stand Stakes (2012)

Little Bridge (5 November 2006 - 5 March 2014) was a racehorse originating from New Zealand. He is best known as the winner of the 2012 Sprinting Champion in Hong Kong and the 2012 King's Stand Stakes at Royal Ascot.

== Background ==
Little Bridge is a gelding born in 2006 out of the Gold Brose mare Golden Rose and by Faltaat. Bred by the Llanhennock Trust he won a trial at Wanganui in December 2009 and was exported to Hong Kong in January 2010.

Little Bridge was trained by Hong Kong trainer Danny Shum and began racing in Hong Kong in the 09/10 season. He won his very first race.

In the 2012 King's Stand Stakes, Little Bridge was placed in draw 7 with jockey Zac Purton. With his win he became the first New Zealand horse to win a group 1 race at Royal Ascot.

Little Bridge has a record of 10 wins out of 22 races. He retired early in the 2013 season and was sent to Australia. He died on 5 March 2014 due to a bout of colic.
