= 2025 World's Best Racehorse Rankings =

The 2025 World's Best Racehorse Rankings, sponsored by Longines was the 2025 edition of the World's Best Racehorse Rankings. It was an assessment of Thoroughbred racehorses issued by the International Federation of Horseracing Authorities (IFHA) on 20 January 2026. It included horses aged three or older which competed in flat races during 2025. It was open to all horses irrespective of where they raced or where they were trained.

== Rankings for 2025 ==
- For a detailed guide to this table, see below.

Rank	Rating	Horse	Age	Sex	Trained	Surface	Cat.
1	130	Calandagan (IRE)	4	G	FR	Turf	I
2	128	Forever Young (JPN)	4	C	JPN	Dirt	M
2	128	Ka Ying Rising (NZ)	5	G	HK	Turf	S
2	128	Masquerade Ball (JPN)	3	C	JPN	Turf	L
2	128	Ombudsman (IRE)	4	C	GB	Turf	I
2	128	Sovereignty (USA)	3	C	USA	Dirt	I
7	127	Daryz (FR)	3	C	FR	Turf	L
7	127	Romantic Warrior (IRE)	7	G	HK	Dirt	I
7	127	Sierra Leone (USA)	4	C	USA	Dirt	I
10	125	Danon Decile (JPN)	4	C	JPN	Turf	L
10	125	Delacroix (IRE)	3	C	IRE	Turf	I
10	125	Field of Gold (IRE)	3	C	GB	Turf	M
10	125	Fierceness (USA)	4	C	USA	Dirt	I
10	125	Jan Brueghel (IRE)	4	C	IRE	Turf	L
15	123	Anmaat (IRE)	7	G	GB	Turf	I
15	123	Minnie Hauk (IRE)	3	F	IRE	Turf	L
15	123	White Abarrio (USA)	6	H	USA	Dirt	M
18	122	Almaqam (GB)	4	C	GB	Turf	I
18	122	Croix du Nord (JPN)	3	C	JPN	Turf	L
18	122	Journalism (USA)	3	C	USA	Dirt	I
18	122	Notable Speech (GB)	4	C	GB	Turf	M
22	121	Byzantine Dream (JPN)	4	C	JPN	Turf	L
22	121	Ethical Diamond (IRE)	5	G	IRE	Turf	L
22	121	Jantar Mantar (JPN)	4	C	JPN	Turf	M
22	121	Justin Palace (JPN)	6	H	JPN	Turf	L
22	121	Los Angeles (IRE)	4	C	IRE	Turf	I
22	121	Meisho Tabaru (JPN)	4	C	JPN	Turf	L
22	121	Mindframe (USA)	4	C	USA	Dirt	M
22	121	Museum Mile (JPN)	3	C	JPN	Turf	L
22	121	Rebel's Romance (IRE)	7	G	GB	Turf	L
22	121	Ruling Court (USA)	3	C	GB	Turf	M
22	121	Sosie (IRE)	4	C	FR	Turf	L
22	121	Soul Rush (JPN)	7	H	JPN	Turf	M
22	121	Trawlerman (IRE)	7	G	GB	Turf	E
22	121	Voyage Bubble (AUS)	7	G	HK	Turf	L
36	120	Al Riffa (FR)	5	H	IRE	Turf	E
36	120	Antino (NZ)	7	G	AUS	Turf	I
36	120	Bellagio Opera (JPN)	5	H	JPN	Turf	I
36	120	Book'em Danno (USA)	4	G	USA	Dirt	S
36	120	Diego Velasquez (IRE)	4	C	IRE	Turf	M
36	120	Durezza (JPN)	5	H	JPN	Turf	L
36	120	Giavellotto (IRE)	6	H	GB	Turf	L
36	120	Kalpana (GB)	4	F	GB	Turf	L
36	120	Lambourn (IRE)	3	C	IRE	Turf	L
36	120	Lazzat (FR)	4	G	FR	Turf	S
36	120	Locked (USA)	4	C	USA	Dirt	I
36	120	Mikki Fight (JPN)	4	C	JPN	Dirt	M
36	120	Raging Torrent (USA)	4	C	USA	Dirt	M
36	120	Tastiera (JPN)	5	H	JPN	Turf	I
36	120	Via Sistina (IRE)	7	M	AUS	Turf	I
36	120	Whirl (IRE)	3	F	IRE	Turf	I
36	120	Zeus Olympios (GB)	3	C	GB	Turf	M

== Guide ==
A complete guide to the main table above.

Rank
A horse's position in the list, with the most highly rated at number 1. Each horse is ranked once according to its highest rating. Any lesser ratings for the same horse are not ranked.

Rating
A rating represents a weight value in pounds, with higher values given to horses which showed greater ability. It is judged that these weights would equalise the abilities of the horses if carried in a theoretical handicap race. The minimum rating required for inclusion is 115.

Horse
Each horse's name is followed by a suffix (from the IFHA's International Code of Suffixes) which indicates the country foaled.

Age
The age of the horse at the time it achieved its rating. The racing ages of all horses foaled in a particular part of the world increase simultaneously, regardless of the actual date of foaling.
Dates of age increase by location foaled
Northern Hemisphere	1 January
South America	1 July
Australia, New Zealand and South Africa	1 August

Sex
C	Colt	Ungelded male horse up to four-years-old
F	Filly	Female horse up to four-years-old
H	Horse	Ungelded male horse over four-years-old
M	Mare	Female horse over four-years-old
G	Gelding	Gelded male horse of any age

Trained
The country where the horse was trained at the time of the rating, abbreviated using the International Code of Suffixes.

Position
The horse's finishing position in the race shown. The actual finishing order can sometimes be amended following an inquiry or a disqualification.
=	Dead-heat
↑	Promoted from original finishing position
↓	Relegated from original finishing position

Race
The race (or one of the races) for which the horse achieved its rating. A defeated horse can be rated above its higher-placed opponents if it carried more weight.

Surface
The surface of the track on which the race was run, eg. turf or dirt. Synthetic surfaces are described as "artificial".

Distance
The distance of the race in metres. In some countries (eg. Canada, Great Britain, Ireland and the United States), the length of a race is usually expressed in miles and furlongs. These units have been converted to metres to allow for universal comparison.
Common conversions
5 furlongs	= 1,006 m	1 mile and 1½ furlongs	= 1,911 m
6 furlongs	= 1,207 m	1 mile and 2 furlongs	= 2,012 m
6½ furlongs	= 1,308 m	1 mile and 2½ furlongs	= 2,112 m
7 furlongs	= 1,408 m	1 mile and 3 furlongs	= 2,213 m
7½ furlongs	= 1,509 m	1 mile and 4 furlongs	= 2,414 m
1 mile	= 1,609 m	1 mile and 6 furlongs	= 2,816 m
1 mile and ½ furlong	= 1,710 m	2 miles	= 3,219 m
1 mile and 1 furlong	= 1,811 m	2 miles and 4 furlongs	= 4,023 m

Category
		Metres	Furlongs
S	Sprint	1,000–1,300; 1,000–1,599 (CAN / USA)	5–6.5; 5–7.99 (CAN / USA)
M	Mile	1,301–1,899; 1,600–1,899 (CAN / USA)	6.51–9.49; 8–9.49 (CAN / USA)
I	Intermediate	1,900–2,100	9.5–10.5
L	Long	2,101–2,700	10.51–13.5
E	Extended	2,701+	13.51+

International Code of Suffixes
The following countries have been represented in the WTR as foaling or training locations since the first edition in 2004.
ARG	Argentina	ITY	Italy
AUS	Australia	JPN	Japan
BRZ	Brazil	KSA	Saudi Arabia
CAN	Canada	NZ	New Zealand
CHI	Chile	SAF	South Africa
CZE	Czech Republic	SIN	Singapore
FR	France	SPA	Spain
GB	Great Britain	TUR	Turkey
GER	Germany	UAE	United Arab Emirates
HK	Hong Kong	USA	United States
HUN	Hungary	VEN	Venezuela
IRE	Ireland	ZIM	Zimbabwe

Shading
The shaded areas represent lesser ratings recorded by horses which were more highly rated in a different category. The IFHA publishes this information when the lower rating is the overall top performance in a particular category.
