= Lucky Nine (horse) =

Irish-bred Thoroughbred racehorse

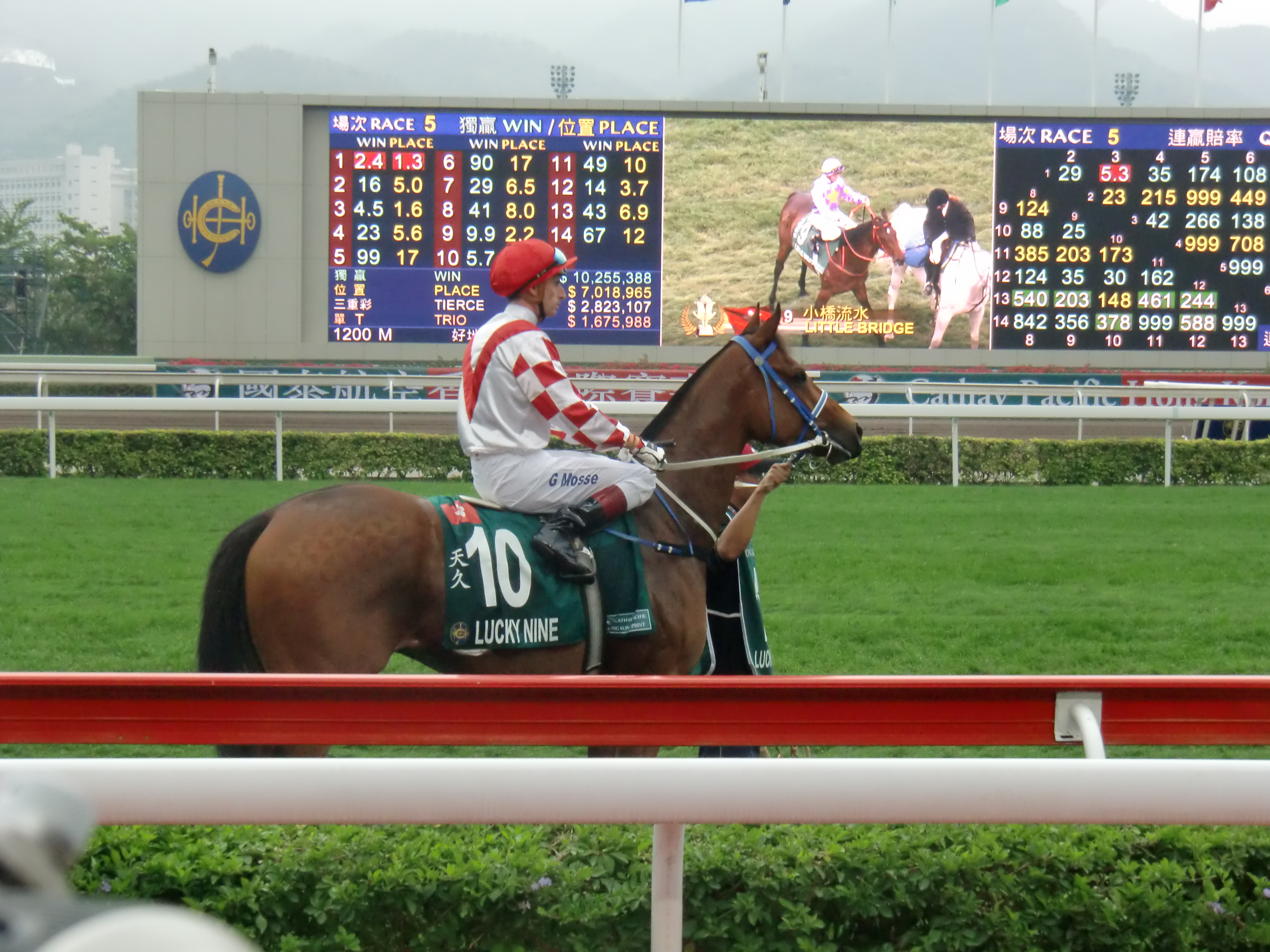
- Sire: Dubawi
- Grandsire: Dubai Millennium
- Dam: Birjand
- Damsire: Green Desert
- Sex: Gelding
- Foaled: 12 March 2007
- Country: Ireland
- Colour: Bay
- Breeder: Darley Stud
- Owner: Andrew Oliver; Dr Chang Fuk To & Maria Chang Lee Ming Shum
- Trainer: Andrew Oliver; Caspar Fownes
- Record: 43:13-8-5
- Earnings: HK$51,373,799 (As of 18 May 2015)

Major wins
- National Day Cup (2010); Hong Kong Classic Mile (2011); Hong Kong Sprint (2011); Queen's Silver Jubilee Cup (2012); Jockey Club Sprint (2012); KrisFlyer International Sprint (2013, 2014); Chairman's Sprint Prize (2013)
- Last updated on August 13, 2009

Lucky Nine (Chinese: 天久 , originally Luck or Design) is an Irish-bred, Hong Kong–based retired racehorse. He was one of the nominees of 2010-2011 Hong Kong Horse of the Year.

== Background ==
Lucky Nine is a bay gelding bred in Ireland by the Darley Stud. He was sired by Dubawi, a son of Dubai Millennium who won the Irish 2,000 Guineas and the Prix Jacques Le Marois in 2005. He was originally named Luck or Design.

== Racing career ==
Luck or Design raced in Ireland as a two-year-old in 2009, winning a maiden race at Naas Racecourse by five lengths. Luck or Design was then sold and exported to race in Hong Kong where he was renamed Lucky Nine.

In Hong Kong, Lucky Nine has won important races including the National Day Cup in 2010, the Hong Kong Classic Mile and the Hong Kong Sprint in 2011 and the Queen's Silver Jubilee Cup in 2012. Racing in international competition he finished second in Japan's Centaur Stakes in 2011 and third in the Dubai Golden Shaheen in 2012.

Lucky Nine went to Singapore for the International Sprint (Kris Flyer) Group 1 race in May 2013, and easily accounted for an international field that included Australian horse Bel Sprinter (who managed to come second).

== Pedigree ==
Pedigree of Lucky Nine
Sire Dubawi 2002 b.	Dubai Millennium; 1996 b.	Seeking the Gold	Mr. Prospector
Sire Dubawi 2002 b.	Dubai Millennium; 1996 b.	Seeking the Gold	Con Game
Sire Dubawi 2002 b.	Dubai Millennium; 1996 b.	Colorado Dancer	Shareef Dancer
Sire Dubawi 2002 b.	Dubai Millennium; 1996 b.	Colorado Dancer	Fall Aspen
Sire Dubawi 2002 b.	Zomaradah; 1995 b.	Deploy	Shirley Heights
Sire Dubawi 2002 b.	Zomaradah; 1995 b.	Deploy	Slightly Dangerous
Sire Dubawi 2002 b.	Zomaradah; 1995 b.	Jawaher	Dancing Brave
Sire Dubawi 2002 b.	Zomaradah; 1995 b.	Jawaher	High Tern
Dam Birjand 1999 b.	Green Desert; 1983 b.	Danzig	Northern Dancer
Dam Birjand 1999 b.	Green Desert; 1983 b.	Danzig	Pas de Nom
Dam Birjand 1999 b.	Green Desert; 1983 b.	Foreign Courier	Sir Ivor
Dam Birjand 1999 b.	Green Desert; 1983 b.	Foreign Courier	Courtly Dee
Dam Birjand 1999 b.	Belle Genius; 1992 ch.	Beau Genius	Bold Ruckus
Dam Birjand 1999 b.	Belle Genius; 1992 ch.	Beau Genius	Royal Colleen
Dam Birjand 1999 b.	Belle Genius; 1992 ch.	Time and Tide	Mr. Leader
Dam Birjand 1999 b.	Belle Genius; 1992 ch.	Time and Tide	Irish Wave
