= Natural Blitz =

Australian-bred thoroughbred horse

- Original name: Shout From Maroof
- Country of origin: Australia
- Born: 2000
- Died: June 10, 2008

Natural Blitz (Chinese: 電光火力; 2000 - May 12, 2008), originally named Shout From Maroof, was an Australian-bred stallion that competed in Australia, Macau, and Hong Kong. Owned by Danny Lam Yin-kee, its trainers included Danny Shum, Derek Cruz and others.

Natural Blitz initially competed in Perth, Western Australia, where it was named Shout From Maroof. Under the tutelage of three different trainers, Natural Blitz won eight of its nine starts in Macau - the first eight in a row.

Natural Blitz died on May 12, 2008. It has been deregistered at the Hong Kong Jockey Club.

== See also ==
- Good Ba Ba
