= Olivier Doleuze =

French jockey

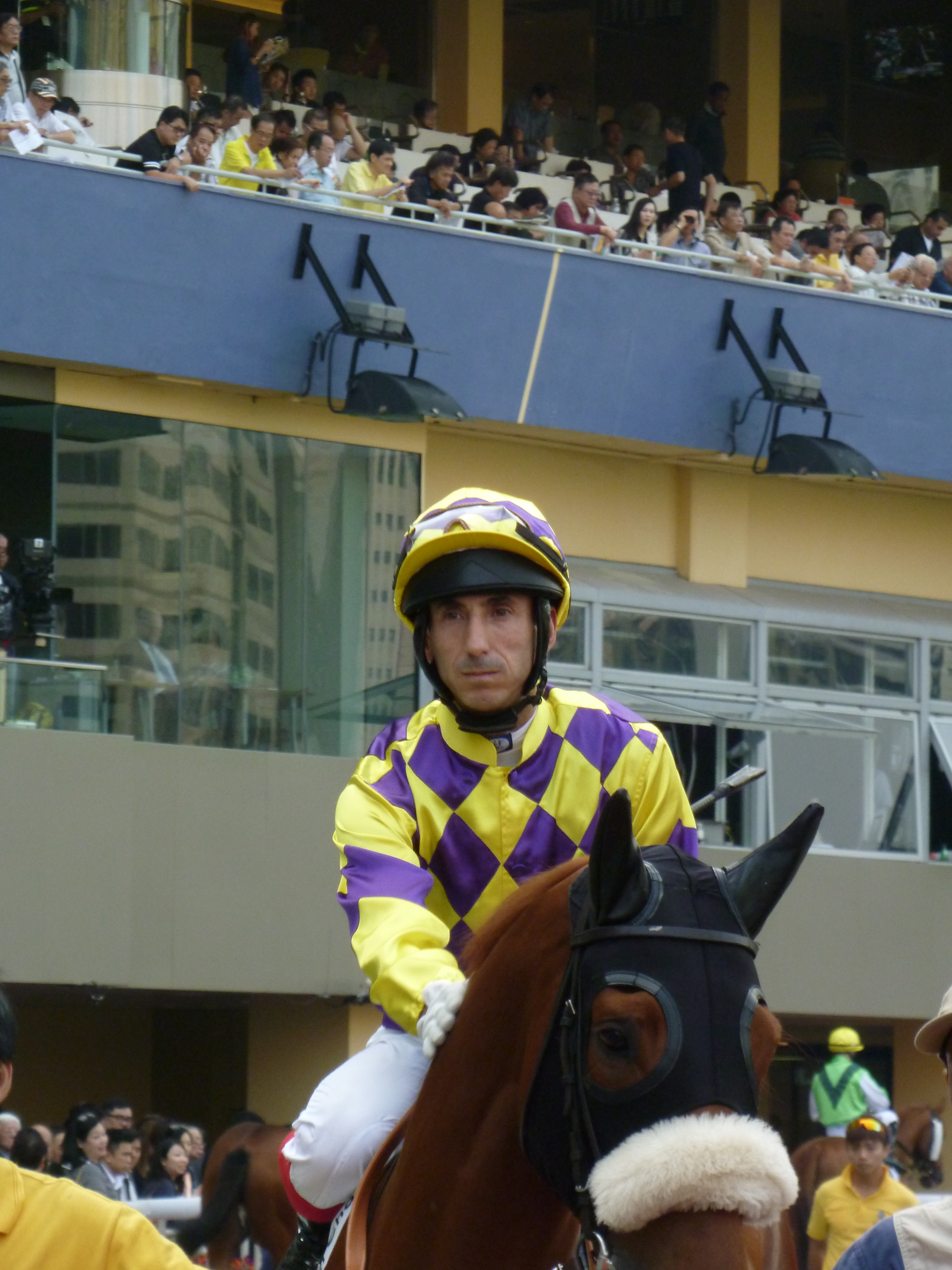
Olivier Doleuze

Olivier Doleuze (born 19 April 1972) is a French-born jockey and considered one of the world's premier jockeys. Doleuze began riding at the age of 14 and finished his career with more than 1,400 wins, 571 of those in Hong Kong. In 2010/11 he rode 38 winners, bringing his Hong Kong career total to 375.

Doleuze announced his retirement in June 2019, putting an end to 31 years in the saddle racing all around the globe.

== Major wins ==
=== France ===
- Critérium de Saint-Cloud - (1) - Special Quest (1997)
- Grand Critérium - (1) - Okawango (2000)
- Poule d'Essai des Poulains - (1) - Green Tune (1994)
- Prix de l'Abbaye de Longchamp - (1) - Kistena (1996)
- Prix du Cadran - (1) - Chief Contender (1997)
- Prix de Diane - (1) - Egyptband (2000)
- Prix de la Forêt - (2) - Occupandiste (1997), Dedication (2002)
- Prix d'Ispahan - (1) - Green Tune (1995)
- Prix Jean Prat - (1) - Rouvres (2002)
- Prix Marcel Boussac - (2) - Loving Claim (1997), Juvenia (1998)
- Prix Maurice de Gheest - (1) - Occupandiste (1997)

=== Hong Kong ===
- Hong Kong Mile - (3) - The Duke (2006), Good Ba Ba (2007, 2009)
- Champions Mile - (1) - Good Ba Ba (2008)
- Chairman's Sprint Prize - (1) - Dim Sum (2011)
- Hong Kong Classic Cup - (1) - Zaidan (2012)
- Centenary Sprint Cup - (3) - Eagle Regiment (2012, 2013), D B Pin (2018)
- Jockey Club Mile - (1) - Gold-Fun (2013)
- Sha Tin Trophy - (1) - Gold-Fun (2013)
- National Day Cup - (1) - Gold-Fun (2013)

=== Singapore ===
- KrisFlyer International Sprint - (1) - Iron Mask (2001)
- Singapore Airlines International Cup - (1) - Chinchon (2012)

=== UAE ===
- Al Shindagha Sprint - (1) - Dynamic Blitz (2011)
- Mahab Al Shimaal - (1) - Rich Tapestry (2014)

=== United States ===
- Santa Anita Sprint Championship - (1) - Rich Tapestry (2014)

== Performance ==
Seasons	Total Rides	No. of Wins	No. of 2nds	No. of 3rds	No. of 4ths	Stakes won
2010/2011	455	38	29	40	47	HK$35,832,500
