= Brett Prebble =

Australian jockey (born 1977)

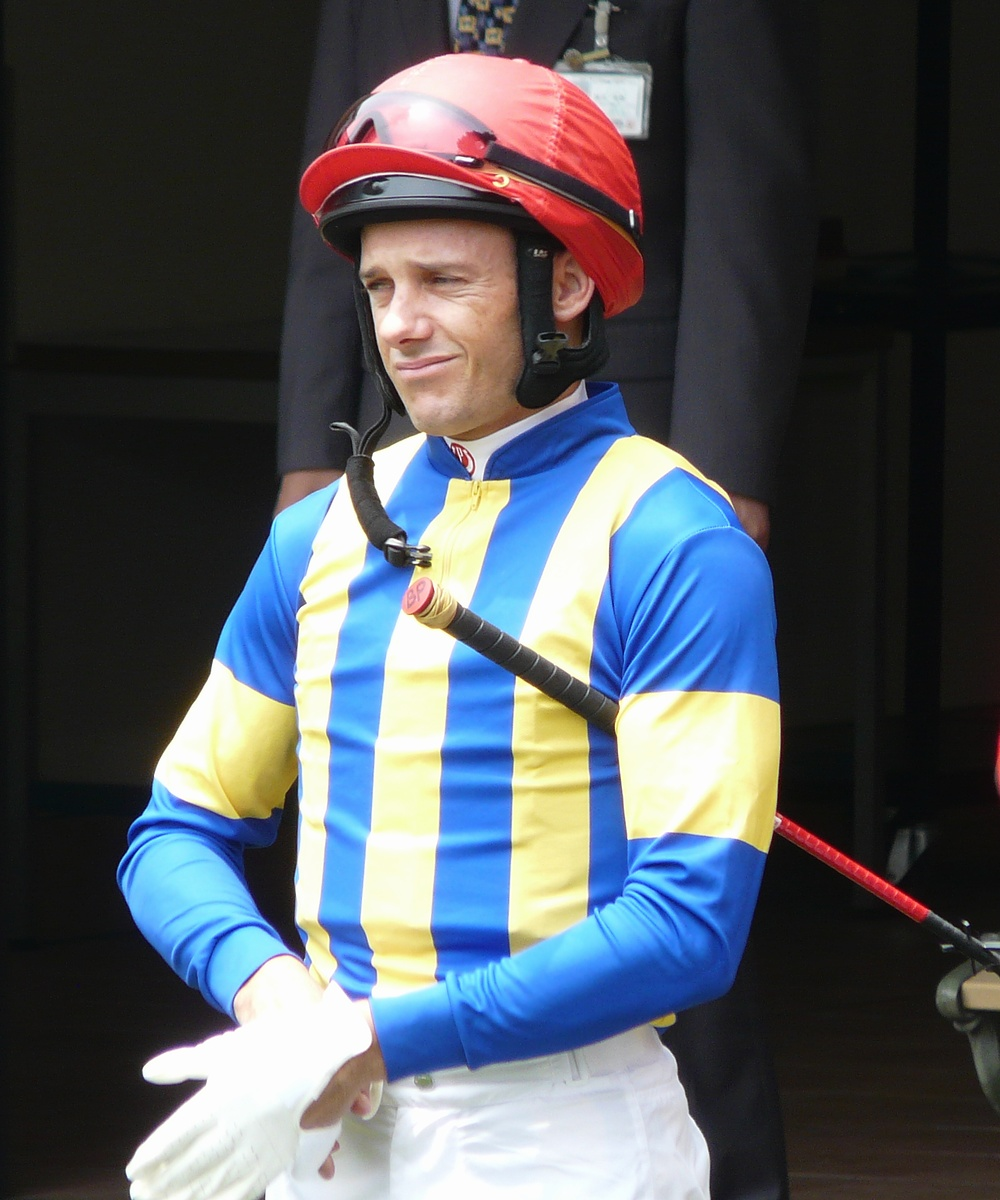

Personal information
- Born: 23 September 1977 (age 48) Melbourne, Victoria, Australia
- Occupation: Jockey

Horse racing career
- Sport: Horse racing

Major racing wins
- Caulfield Cup; Champions & Chater Cup; Hong Kong Derby; Melbourne Cup; Yasuda Kinen

Significant horses
- Bullish Luck, Cape of Good Hope, Green Moon, Incentivise, Lucky Nine, Sacred Kingdom

Brett Prebble (born 23 September 1977) is an Australian jockey, currently based in Melbourne, Victoria. Having ridden over 1200 career winners, Prebble's most famous win came aboard Green Moon in the 2012 Emirates Melbourne Cup.

== Personal life ==
Prebble was born in Ballarat, Victoria. He and his ex wife have two children, one of them, Tom, followed his father's footsteps and became an apprenticing jockey.. He is the brother-in-law of two Melbourne Cup-winning jockeys: Michelle Payne, who won the Cup in 2015, and Kerrin McEvoy, who won the Cup in 2000, 2016 and 2018.

== Career as a jockey ==
Prebble was a champion jockey in Melbourne before he moved to Hong Kong in 2002. He held the record for the number of winners in a Melbourne Metropolitan racing season, with 99 winners and one dead heat in 1999–2000, until Jamie Kah set a new record in July 2021 when she rode her 100th winner for the 2020–21 season.

His competition with Douglas Whyte for the 2009–10 Hong Kong Jockeys' Championship was one of the closest in Hong Kong racing history, with Whyte winning 100 to 99. His winning tally of 78 in the 2010–11 season brought his overall total in Hong Kong to 525.

In 2012 Prebble won Australia's most famous race, the Melbourne Cup, on Green Moon. He was chosen to ride Green Moon, owned by Lloyd Williams and trained by Robert Hickmott, in place of Damien Oliver, who was dropped from the ride after being accused of betting illegally. Green Moon went on to win the race by one length.

Prebble retired from riding in June 2024 to focus on his business Persuader International.

== Major wins ==
Australia

- Australian Guineas - (1) - Wandjina (2015)
- Caulfield Cup - (1) - Incentivise (2021)
- Caulfield Stakes - (1) - Probabeel (2021)
- Golden Slipper Stakes - (1)- Crystal Lily (2010)
- J.J. Atkins - (1) - Lovely Jubbly (2002)
- Makybe Diva Stakes - (2) - Native Jazz (2001), Incentivise (2021)
- Melbourne Cup - (1) - Green Moon (2012)
- Memsie Stakes - (2) - Le Zagaletta (2003), Behemoth (2021)
- Oakleigh Plate - (1) - Miss Kournikova (2001)
- Queensland Derby - (1) - De Gaulle Lane (2001)
- Robert Sangster Stakes - (1) - Mad Shavril (1996)
- Sir Rupert Clarke Stakes - (1) - Testa Rossa (2000)
- Sydney Cup - (1) - Daacha (1995)
- Perth Railway Stakes - (1) - Slavonic (1999)
- The Galaxy - (1) – Black Bean (2000)
- The Goodwood - (1) - Keeper (2001)
- Toorak Handicap - (1) - Sober Suit (1995)
- Turnbull Stakes - (1) - Incentivise (2021)
- Vinery Stud Stakes - (1) - Hill of Grace (2000)
- VRC Champions Sprint - (1) - Pharein (1999)
- VRC Champions Mile - (1) - Titanic Jack (2003)
- VRC Oaks - (1) - Lovelorn (2000)
- William Reid Stakes – (2) - Miss Pennymoney (2000), Cape of Good Hope (2005)

Hong Kong

- Centenary Sprint Cup - (3) - Absolute Champion (2008), Sacred Kingdom (2010,2011)
- Chairman's Sprint Prize - (4) - Absolute Champion (2007), Sacred Kingdom (2010), Lucky Nine (2013,2014)
- Champions & Chater Cup - (1) - Precision (2003)
- Champions Mile - (3) - Bullish Luck (2006), Sight Winner (2009), Contentment (2017)
- Hong Kong Classic Mile - (1) - Lucky Nine (2011)
- Hong Kong Derby - (1) - Vital King (2007)
- Hong Kong Sprint - (3) - Absolute Champion (2006), Sacred Kingdom (2009), Lucky Nine (2011)
- Queen's Silver Jubilee Cup - (1) - Lucky Nine (2012), Contentment (2016)

Japan

- Yasuda Kinen - (1) - Bullish Luck (2006)

Singapore

- KrisFlyer International Sprint - (3) - Sacred Kingdom (2009), Lucky Nine (2013,2014)

== Performance ==
Seasons	Total Rides	No. of Wins	No. of 2nds	No. of 3rds	No. of 4ths	Stakes won
2010–11	494	78	65	56	51	HK$75,344,850
