= Derek Cruz =

Derek Cruz (born 23 May 1955) acted as a Jockey & assistant trainer before being granted a full permit to train in Hong Kong starting in 1991. He got a successful 2010/11 season in which he sent out 24 winners for an overall total of 432.

== Significant horses ==
- Natural Blitz
- Good Ba Ba
- Joy And Fun
- Cerise Cherry

== Performance ==
Seasons	Total Runners	No. of Wins	No. of 2nds	No. of 3rds	No. of 4ths	Stakes won
2010/2011	338	24	25	22	32	HK$19,654,655
