= Zac Purton =

Hong Kong-based champion Australian jockey

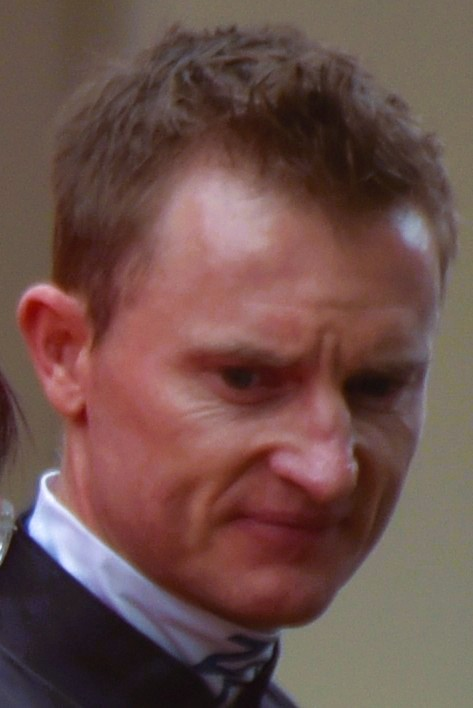
- Purton in February 2026

Personal information
- Born: 3 January 1983 Lismore, New South Wales, Australia
- Occupation: Jockey

Horse racing career
- Sport: Horse racing

Major racing wins
- The Everest; Caulfield Cup; Doncaster Handicap; Hong Kong Cup; Hong Kong Derby; Hong Kong Vase; King's Stand Stakes; Takamatsunomiya Kinen

Racing awards
- Hong Kong Champion Jockey (2013/14, 2017/18, 2018/19, 2019/20, 2021/22, 2022/23, 2023/24, 2024/25, 2025/26)

Honours
- Australian Racing Hall of Fame

Significant horses
- Beauty Generation, Little Bridge, Military Attack, Ambitious Dragon, Ka Ying Rising

Zachary "Zac" Purton (born 3 January 1983) is an Australian jockey who has won the most races in Hong Kong racing history and won the Hong Kong Jockeys' Championship on seven occasions.

Purton is married to Nicole, the daughter of Australian Hall of Fame jockey Jim Cassidy. Zac and Nicole have two children, Cash and Roxy.

Purton has won all four of the Hong Kong International Races at least once and the Hong Kong Derby twice.

In the saddle, he has few weaknesses, and is an astute operator when it comes to off-track aspects of decision-making and relationship-building in Hong Kong.

He appeared in the music video of the song "大展鴻圖" ("Blueprint Supreme") by SKAI ISYOURGOD as a symbol of success and wealth.

== Background and early years ==
From a non-racing background, Purton spent most of his childhood and teenage years in the coastal town of Coffs Harbour, on the New South Wales mid-north coast in Australia. He also spent time in the town of Nelson on the South Island of New Zealand and Mount Gambier, South Australia.

It was in Nelson where Purton first came into contact with horses, and then for a short time around standardbreds in Mount Gambier.

Back in Coffs Harbour, Purton left school at 14 and went to local horse trainer Trevor Hardy, who guided him early on. “People say to me, ‘Gee you did a good job with him,’ but I can't take credit for it, it's just natural ability,” Hardy says. “Maybe I helped him as a person though.”

Purton's mother Liz recalled her son's attitude early: “He would get off the horse and tell the owners their horse was a donkey. Well, it might be true, but it isn't what the owner wants to hear.”

Purton won the Brisbane jockeys' premiership as an apprentice in 2003, then moved to Sydney and was quickly amongst the top jockeys there before he began his Hong Kong career in 2007/08.

== Hong Kong ==
In the 2013/14 season, Purton ended the 13-year championship reign of Douglas Whyte, becoming the first Australian jockey to win the Hong Kong title since Noel Barker in 1991. (112 wins). He notched up 112 wins on his way to the title. Purton also raced to what was then the fastest 50 in Hong Kong history that season and became the second rider, after Whyte, to notch 100 wins in a season. Purton lost his title when he came second to João Moreira in 2014/15 with 95 wins, then was runner-up to Moreira again in 2015-16 and 2016–17 before reclaiming the Hong Kong championship in 2017–18 in a close finish.

Purton's record-setting 179 wins in the 2023–24 season delivered a sixth Hong Kong jockeys’ championship, but that was achieved with his arch-rivals Whyte and Moreira out of the picture.

First there was the 2021-22 title which he took after a season-long duel with Joao Moreira. Purton rode four winners to Moreira's none on the final day of the season to clinch his fifth title.

Whyte has the most wins all-time by a jockey in Hong Kong. Purton took the record with his 1,814th win, View Of The World at Happy Valley on January 22, 2025.

Purton represented Hong Kong in the World Super Jockey Series held by the Japan Racing Association in 2012, recording two wins and being crowned as champion.

He won the Hong Kong Derby in 2015, with the John Size-trained Luger, and his Hong Kong Cup win on Time Warp in 2017 made Purton only the third jockey, after Gerald Mosse and Moreira, to have won all four of Hong Kong's December international races.

In the 2024/25 season, Purton won eight races from eight starts on sprinter Ka Ying Rising, including four Group 1 races. Ka Ying Rising first broke Sha Tin's 1200m track record in November 2024 when he ran 1:07.43 in the G2 Jockey Club Sprint – shading former champion Sacred Kingdom's 17-year-old record – before setting a new mark of 1:07.20 in the G1 Centenary Sprint Cup in January 2025.

== Major wins ==
Australia

- AJC Sires' Produce Stakes - (2) - Excites (2006), Yankee Rose (2016)
- Canterbury Stakes - (1) - Artorius (2023)
- Caulfield Cup - (1) - Admire Rakti (2014)
- Doncaster Handicap - (3) - Sacred Falls (2014), It's Somewhat (2017), Mr Brightside (2023)
- Epsom Handicap - (1) - Theseo (2008)
- The J. J. Atkins - (1) - Sacred Elixir (2016)
- George Main Stakes - (1) - Sacred Falls (2014)
- Randwick Guineas - (1) - Communist (2023)
- Norton Stakes - (1) - He's No Pie Eater (2007)
- The Galaxy - (1) - In Her Time (2018)
- Winx Stakes - (1) - Sir Dex (2005)
- The Everest - (1) - Ka Ying Rising (2025)

United Kingdom

- King's Stand Stakes - (1) - Little Bridge (2012)

Hong Kong

- Centenary Sprint Cup - (3) - Aerovelocity (2016), Lucky Sweynesse (2023), Ka Ying Rising (2025)
- Chairman's Sprint Prize - (2) - Ivictory (2018), Lucky Sweynesse (2023)
- Champions Mile - (2) - Beauty Generation (2018, 2019)
- Hong Kong Champions & Chater Cup - (2) - Exultant (2019, 2020)
- Hong Kong Classic Cup - (1) - California Spangle (2022)
- Hong Kong Cup - (2) - Time Warp (2017), Normcore (2020)
- Hong Kong Derby - (1) - Luger (2015), Massive Sovereign (2024)
- Hong Kong Gold Cup - (3) - Military Attack (2013), Time Warp (2018), Exultant (2019)
- Hong Kong Mile - (4) - Ambitious Dragon (2012), Beauty Only (2016), Beauty Generation (2018), California Spangle (2022)
- Hong Kong Sprint - (5) - Aerovelocity (2014, 2016), Lucky Sweynesse (2023), Ka Ying Rising (2024, 2025)
- Hong Kong Vase - (2) - Dominant (2013), Exultant (2018)
- Queen Elizabeth II Cup - (1) - Exultant (2020)
- Queen's Silver Jubilee Cup - (4) - Ambitious Dragon (2013), Beauty Generation (2018, 2019, 2020)
- Stewards' Cup - (3) - Fellowship (2010), Beauty Generation (2019), Waikuku (2022)

Japan

- Takamatsunomiya Kinen - (1) - Aerovelocity (2015)

Singapore

- Kranji Mile - (2) - Southern Legend (2018, 2019)
- KrisFlyer International Sprint - (1) - Aerovelocity (2015)
- Singapore Airlines International Cup - (1) - Military Attack (2013)

Macau

- Macau Hong Kong Trophy - (1) - Romantic Touch (2017)
- Macau Derby - (1) - Sacred Man (2017)

== Performance at the Hong Kong Jockey Club ==
| Seasons | Total Rides | No. of Wins | No. of 2nds | No. of 3rds | No. of 4ths | Stakes won |
|---|---|---|---|---|---|---|
| 2007/2008 | 420 | 29 | 23 | 30 | 26 | HK$22,437,475 |
| 2008/2009 | 489 | 43 | 40 | 37 | 37 | HK$37,035,812 |
| 2009/2010 | 518 | 48 | 56 | 38 | 50 | HK$48,676,250 |
| 2010/2011 | 527 | 53 | 40 | 45 | 57 | HK$41,472,500 |
| 2011/2012 | 482 | 64 | 53 | 58 | 42 | HK$50,993,250 |
| 2012/2013 | 550 | 88 | 86 | 51 | 52 | HK$94,153,400 |
| 2013/2014 | 639 | 112 | 86 | 68 | 56 | HK$101,465,937 |
| 2014/2015 | 481 | 95 | 66 | 41 | 40 | HK$107,683,325 |
| 2015/2016 | 531 | 80 | 74 | 49 | 51 | HK$97,453,000 |
| 2016/2017 | 604 | 107 | 92 | 60 | 48 | HK$140,821,315 |
| 2017/2018 | 635 | 136 | 107 | 64 | 60 | HK$181,824,240 |
| 2018/2019 | 680 | 168 | 111 | 69 | 62 | HK$234,989,515 |
| 2019/2020 | 707 | 147 | 101 | 100 | 56 | HK$202,112,646 |
| 2020/2021 | 713 | 125 | 117 | 75 | 72 | HK$173,768,000 |
| 2021/2022 | 674 | 136 | 97 | 96 | 66 | HK$185,307,365 |
| 2022/2023 | 715 | 179 | 110 | 63 | 69 | HK$277,712,06 |
| 2023/2024 | 680 | 130 | 102 | 98 | 65 | HK$232,823,098 |
| 2024/2025 | 593 | 138 | 85 | 69 | 55 | HK$213,311,025 |
