= David Hall (horse trainer) =

Australian horse trainer (born 1963)

David Joseph Hall (born 27 October 1963) is an Australian horse trainer.

The son of trainer, Joe Hall, he obtained his trainer's license in 1988 at Morphettville. In 1993, he moved to race in Melbourne where he became famous for training Makybe Diva to the first of her three successive Melbourne Cup victories in 2003.

David Hall was granted a trainer license by the Hong Kong Jockey Club in 2004.

In 2010/11, he trained 21 winners and by the end of that season had run up an overall Hong Kong total of 209. In 2013/14 he trained 25 winners, including Bubble Chic who won the HKG3 Premier Plate and HKG3 Queen Mother Memorial Cup. He has accrued an overall Hong Kong total of 292.

== Significant horses ==
- Absolute Champion

== Performance ==
Seasons	Total Runners	No. of Wins	No. of 2nds	No. of 3rds	No. of 4ths	Stakes won
2010/2011	328	21	31	23	25	HK$20,498,000
