= John Size =

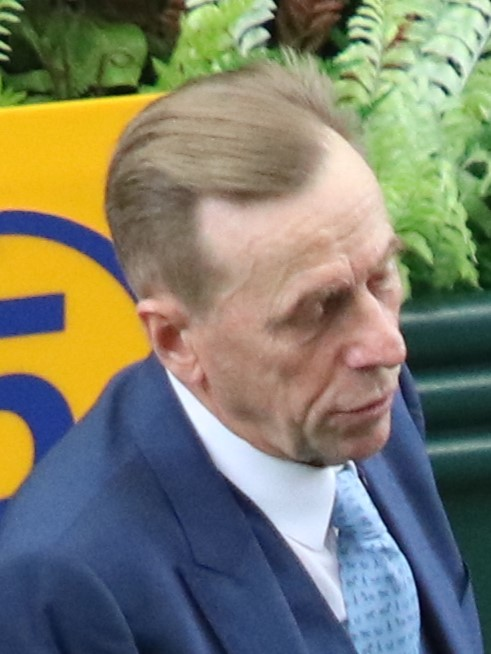
Size at the Sha Tin Racecourse on 19 March 2023

John Size (born 10 July 1954) is one of the most successful racehorse trainers in Hong Kong history and was inducted into the Australian Racing Hall Of Fame in 2018. After a successful career in his native Australia, Size arrived in Hong Kong for the 2001-02 season with a reputation for rejuvenating horses set back by illness or injury and for his ability to mould and develop young horses from the beginning of their careers. In his first season, he trained 58 winners to become only the second trainer ever to win the championship title in his first season. Size subsequently added more championships in 2003, 2004, 2006, 2008, 2010, 2012, 2016, 2017, 2018 and 2019, and shares the record of 11 Hong Kong title wins with another legendary Australian, George Moore. Size holds the record for the number of winners saddled in a Hong Kong season - 95 in 2016-17 and, in the 2017-18 season, broke the Hong Kong record for prizemoney won by his runners with HK$176,441,240. At the end of the 2019-20 season, he had trained 1,257 winners in Hong Kong, ranking him only behind John Moore (1,735) and Tony Cruz (1,294). He lives in Hong Kong with his wife, Coco, and their daughter, Carina.

== Significant wins ==
- Stewards' Cup: Electronic Unicorn (2002, 2003), Super Kid (2004), Armada (2007), Glorious Days (2013), Waikuku (2020, 2022).
- Champions Mile: Electronic Unicorn (2003), Sight Winner (2009), Contentment (2017).
- Chairman's Sprint Prize: Grand Delight (2003), Ivictory (2018), Beat The Clock (2019).
- Hong Kong Sprint: Mr Stunning (2017), Beat The Clock (2019).
- Hong Kong Mile: Glorious Days (2013).
- Centenary Sprint Cup: Grand Delight (2003), D B Pin (2018), Beat the Clock (2019).
- Bauhinia Sprint Trophy: Grand Delight (2003), Amazing Kids (2017), Premiere (2018).
- Queen's Silver Jubilee Cup: Electronic Unicorn (2004), Contentment (2016).
- Queen Elizabeth II Cup: River Dancer (2004).
- Champions & Chater Cup: Super Kid (2004).
- Hong Kong Derby: Fay Fay (2012), Luger (215), Ping Hai Star (2018).
- Hong Kong Classic Mile: Sun Jewellery (2016), Nothingilikemore (2018)
- Hong Kong Classic Cup: Unique Jewellery (2009), It Has To Be You (2013), Thunder Fantasy (2015), Sun Jewellery (2016).
- George Ryder Stakes: Al Mansour (2000)
- AJC Queen Elizabeth Stakes: Georgie Boy (2000)
- The Galaxy (ATC): Padstow (2001).
- All Aged Stakes: El Mirada (2001).

== Performance ==
Seasons	Total Runners	No. of Wins	No. of 2nds	No. of 3rds	No. of 4ths	Stakes won
2001/2002	291	58	38	31	26	HK$49,397,600
2002/2003	468	67	57	53	46	HK$81,745,270
2003/2004	550	73	60	53	57	HK$79,294,520
2004/2005	467	50	43	45	49	HK$45,646,975
2005/2006	552	77	52	47	59	HK$54,658,570
2006/2007	369	32	33	24	37	HK$35,122,100
2007/2008	402	68	42	28	31	HK$48,516,700
2008/2009	456	61	40	42	34	HK$63,405,550
2009/2010	483	75	52	51	28	HK$61,630,862
2010/2011	459	64	55	35	44	HK$56,703,975
2011/2012	516	70	54	57	46	HK$78,102,412
2012/2013	463	64	58	42	52	HK$78,475,750
2013/2014	589	62	58	45	35	HK$75,660,375
2014/2015	477	63	53	44	45	HK$80,242,641
2015/2016	461	68	60	54	40	HK$97,917,837
2016/2017	541	95	75	50	64	HK$120,752,162
2017/2018	508	87	66	50	54	HK$176,441,240
2018/2019	529	78	80	54	50	HK$143,413,500
2019/2020	542	46	73	51	49	HK$117,372,145
