= Karis Teetan =

Mauritian jockey (born 1990)

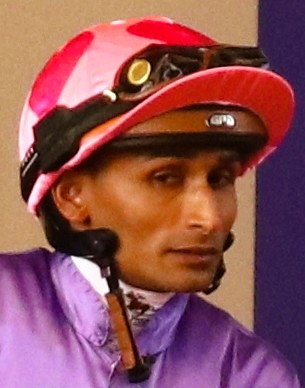
- Teetan in 2025 (Sha Tin Racecourse)

Personal information
- Born: 3 June 1990 (age 35) Mauritius
- Occupation: jockey

Horse racing career
- Sport: Horse racing

Karis Teetan (born 3 June 1990 in Mauritius) is a horse racing jockey in Hong Kong. He was a South African Champion Apprentice in 2008. He start riding in Hong Kong at August 2013. He also has won with more than 400 winners in Hong Kong and won the Hong Kong International Jockeys' Championship in 2019.

== Performance at the Hong Kong Jockey Club ==
Seasons	Total Rides	No. of Wins	No. of 2nds	No. of 3rds	No. of 4ths	Stakes won
2013/2014	583	50	43	38	53	HK$50,236,937
2014/2015	517	29	46	47	48	HK$40,030,300
2015/2016	575	47	44	49	55	HK$54,158,200
2016/2017	631	40	59	54	58	HK$60,528,275
2017/2018	588	52	54	70	60	HK$70,099,585
2018/2019	693	84	69	71	72	HK$110,674,060
2019/2020	719	93	75	81	81	HK$138,503,489
2020/2021	741	79	92	90	83	HK$139,547,000
2021/2022	665	73	79	69	77	HK$139,847,225
2022/2023	586	56	51	55	61	HK$84,861,500
2023/2024	722	86	98	75	75	HK$143,056,185
2024/2025	634	44	54	66	68	HK$87,564,880

== Major wins ==
Hong Kong

- Hong Kong Sprint - (1) - Mr Stunning (2018)
- Chairman's Sprint Prize - (1) - Mr Stunning (2020)
- Hong Kong Champions & Chater Cup - (1) - Panfield (2021)
- Hong Kong Classic Cup - (1) - Thunder Fantasy (2015)
- Hong Kong Derby - (1) - Romantic Warrior (2022)
- Queen Elizabeth II Cup - (1) - Romantic Warrior (2022)

South Africa

- Castle Tankard - (1) - Grisham (2011)
- Paddock Stakes - (1) - Thunder Dance (2012)
- Daily News 2000 - (1) - Jackson (2012)
- Cape Derby - (1) - Jackson (2012)
- Empress Club Stakes - (1) - Jackson (2012)
