= David A. Hayes =

Australian horse trainer (born 1962)

David Andrew Hayes (born 22 October 1962) is an Australian Thoroughbred racehorse trainer who has total of 95 Group One wins in his name, (77 in Australia, 17 in Hong Kong and one in Japan) including winner of the Melbourne Cup, Cox Plate, Caulfield Cup and Golden Slipper.

Hayes became the youngest member to be admitted into the Australian Racing Hall of Fame in 2008. He has trained in excess of 4,000 winners. David Hayes is currently training in Hong Kong.

He is the son of the trainer Colin Hayes. His family include three sons, Ben Hayes & JD Hayes, who train in partnership at Lindsay Park, Victoria, Australia. William Hayes, who played in the VFL and AFL is involved in the family training business along with David's daughter Sophie.

He grew up in Angaston in the Barossa Valley and attended St Peter’s College as a boarder.

He was a promising Australian Rules Footballer, playing for SANFL club Central Districts before retiring at 20 to pursue his career in racing.

== Group One wins ==
- 1 Melbourne Cup (Jeune 1994)
- 2 Cox Plates (Better Loosen Up 1990, Fields of Omagh 2006)
- 6 Australian Cup (Better Loosen Up 1991, Niconero 2009, Spillway 2015, Harlem 2018 & 2019, Fifty Star 2020)
- 1 Japan Cup (Better Loosen Up 1990)
- 2 Hong Kong Sprint (All Thrills Too 2002, Ka Ying Rising 2024)
- 1 Hong Kong Derby (Elegant Fashion 2003)
- 6 Blue Diamond Stakes (Canonise 1991, Principality 1995, Nadeem 2006, Sleek Chassis 2007, Reaan 2008, Catchy 2017)
- 5 Emirates Stakes (Planet Ruler 1992, Primacy 1993, Seascay 1994, 1995, All American 2009)
- 4 Futurity Stakes (Primacy 1994, Fields of Omagh 2006, Niconero 2008, 2009)
- 3 Kingston Town Classic (Credit Account 1993, Niconero 2006, 2008)
- 2 Metropolitan Stakes (Glastonbury 1994, Tawqeet 2006)
- 2 Salinger Stakes (Planet Ruler 1990, Alishan 1993)
- 3 C F Orr Stakes (Planet Ruler 1991, Primacy 1994, Jeune 1995)
- 3 Caulfield Cups (Fraar 1993, Tawqeet 2006, Boom Time 2017)
- 2 Caulfield Stakes (Criterion 2015, Cape of Good Hope 2019)
- 2 Caulfield Guineas (Palace Reign 1992, St. Covet 1994)
- 3 Thousand Guineas (Miss Finland 2006, Irish Lights 2009, Stay With Me 2015)
- 2 Sir Rupert Clarke Stakes (Barely a Moment 2005, Rewayaa 2006)
- 2 Rosehill Guineas (Star of Maple 1994, De Beers 2006)
- 2 Victoria Derby (Blevic 1994, Kibbutz 2007)
- 1 Crown Oaks (Miss Finland 2006)
- 1 Golden Slipper (Miss Finland 2006)
- 3 Newmarket Handicap (Primacy 1993, Redkirk Warrior 2017, 2018)
- 1 Australian Guineas (Miss Finland 2007)
- 2 Toorak Handicap (Barely A Moment 2005, He's our Rokkii 2016)
- 1 Sydney Cup (Azzaam 1993)
- 1 Ranvet Stakes (Dark Ksar 1994)
- 1 Mackinnon Stakes (Better Loosen Up 1990)
- 1 George Main Stakes (Planet Ruler 1991)
- 1 William Reid Stakes (Wrap Around 1992)
- 1 WATC Derby (Chartreux 2010)
- 2 Oakleigh Plate (Eagle Falls 2011, Sheidel 2016)
- 2 Lightning Stakes (Nicconi 2010, Redkirk Warrior 2018)
- 1 The Galaxy (Nicconi 2009)
- 2 Queen Elizabeth Stakes (Jeune 1995, Criterion 2015)
- 1 AJC Sires Produce (St Covet 1994)
- 1 Underwood Stakes (Jeune 1994)
- 1 Arrowfield Stud Stakes (Miss Finland 2007)
- 1 Australasian Oaks (Anamato 2007)
- 1 Memsie Stakes (Vega Magic 2017)
- 1 The Goodwood (Vega Magic 2017)
- 1 South Australian Derby (Qafila 2019)
- 1 Centenary Sprint Cup (Ka Ying Rising 2025)
