= Golden Sixty =

Australian-bred Thoroughbred racehorse

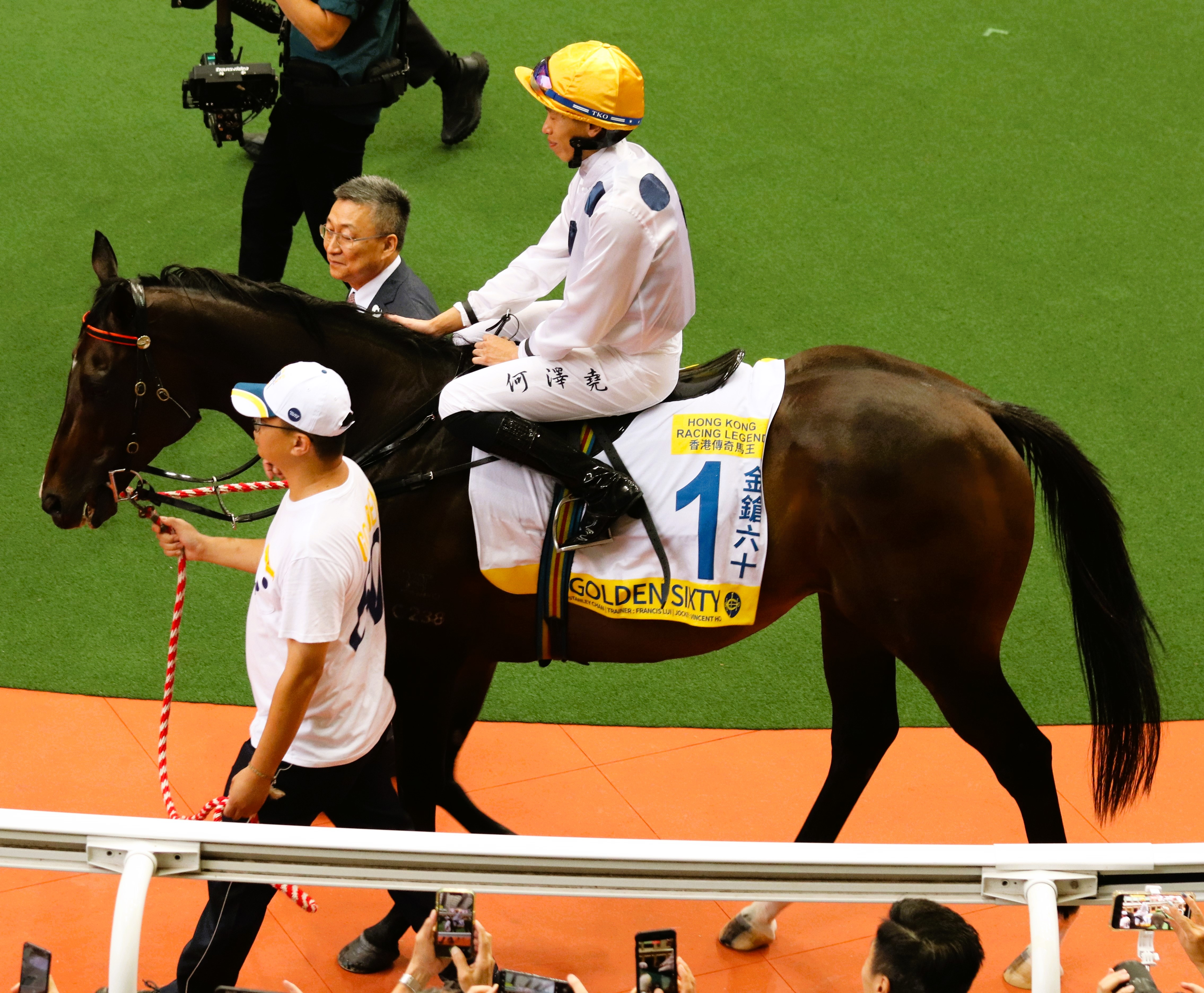
- On 22 September 2024, Golden Sixty made its last public appearance in its retirement ceremony held at Sha Tin Racecourse, guided by Vincent C Y Ho and accompanied by Francis Lui
- Sire: Medaglia d'Oro
- Grandsire: El Prado
- Dam: Gaudeamus
- Damsire: Distorted Humor
- Sex: Gelding
- Foaled: 14 October 2015
- Country: Australia
- Colour: Brown
- Breeder: Asco International
- Owner: Stanley Chan Ka Leung
- Trainer: Francis Lui Kin Wai
- Jockey: Vincent C Y Ho
- Record: 31: 26-2-1-1
- Earnings: HK$167,170,600

Major wins
- Chinese Club Challenge Cup (2020); Hong Kong Classic Mile (2020); Hong Kong Classic Cup (2020); Hong Kong Derby (2020); Celebration Cup (2020); Sha Tin Trophy (2020); Jockey Club Mile (2020, 2021, 2022); Hong Kong Mile (2020, 2021, 2023); Stewards' Cup (2021, 2023); Hong Kong Gold Cup (2021, 2023); Champions Mile (2021, 2022, 2023); Chairman's Trophy (2022)

Awards
- Hong Kong Horse of the Year (2021, 2022, 2023); Lifetime Achievement Award (2024); Hong Kong Most Popular Horse of the Year (2020, 2021, 2022, 2023); Hong Kong Champion Four-Year-Old (2020); Hong Kong Champion Miler (2021, 2022, 2023, 2024); Hong Kong Champion Middle-Distance Horse (2021)
- Last updated on 13 September 2024

Golden Sixty (Chinese: 金鎗六十, foaled 14 October 2015) is a champion Australian-bred Hong Kong-trained Thoroughbred racehorse who won the Four-Year-Old Classic Series in year 2020 and was named the 2020/2021, 2021/2022, and 2022/2023 Hong Kong Horse of the Year.

After being sold to New Zealand-based interests as a yearling he was exported to Hong Kong as a two-year-old. In his first season the gelding won his first three races but ran unplaced in his final start. In the 2019/2020 season he emerged as one of the best horses in Hong Kong as he was undefeated in seven starts including the Chinese Club Challenge Cup, Hong Kong Classic Mile, Hong Kong Classic Cup, and Hong Kong Derby. In the 2020/2021 season he won another seven consecutive races: the Celebration Cup, Sha Tin Trophy, Jockey Club Mile, Hong Kong Mile, Stewards' Cup, Hong Kong Gold Cup and Champions Mile to take his unbeaten run to fourteen. In the 2021/2022 season he increased his unbeaten run to 16 with wins in the Jockey Club Mile and Hong Kong Mile for the second consecutive year.

On 26 February 2023, Golden Sixty raced in the Hong Kong Gold Cup for the third time and claimed his 24th win, which surpassed the 85-year record of 23 wins in Hong Kong maintained by the 1930s racehorse Liberty Bay, making Golden Sixty the racehorse with the most wins in Hong Kong horse racing history.

On 9 March 2023, Golden Sixty ranked first with a score of 125 in the Longines World's Best Racehorse Rankings.

On 30 April 2023, Golden Sixty claimed his third consecutive win in the Champions Mile, marking not only his 25th win but also his 9th international Group One win, which surpasses Beauty Generation's record of 8 international Group One wins. Golden Sixty also becomes the racehorse with the most prize money earnings in the world, breaking the record made by Winx.

On 14 July 2023, Golden Sixty claimed his third consecutive title as the Hong Kong Horse of the Year, becoming the first racehorse to achieve this record in Hong Kong racing history.

On 10 December 2023, Golden Sixty claimed his third win in the Hong Kong Mile, marking his 26th win as he joined Good Ba Ba as a three-time winner of this race. For Golden Sixty, this is also his 10th international Group One win.

On 13 September 2024, Golden Sixty officially retired, ending his legendary racing career of more than five years.

== Background ==
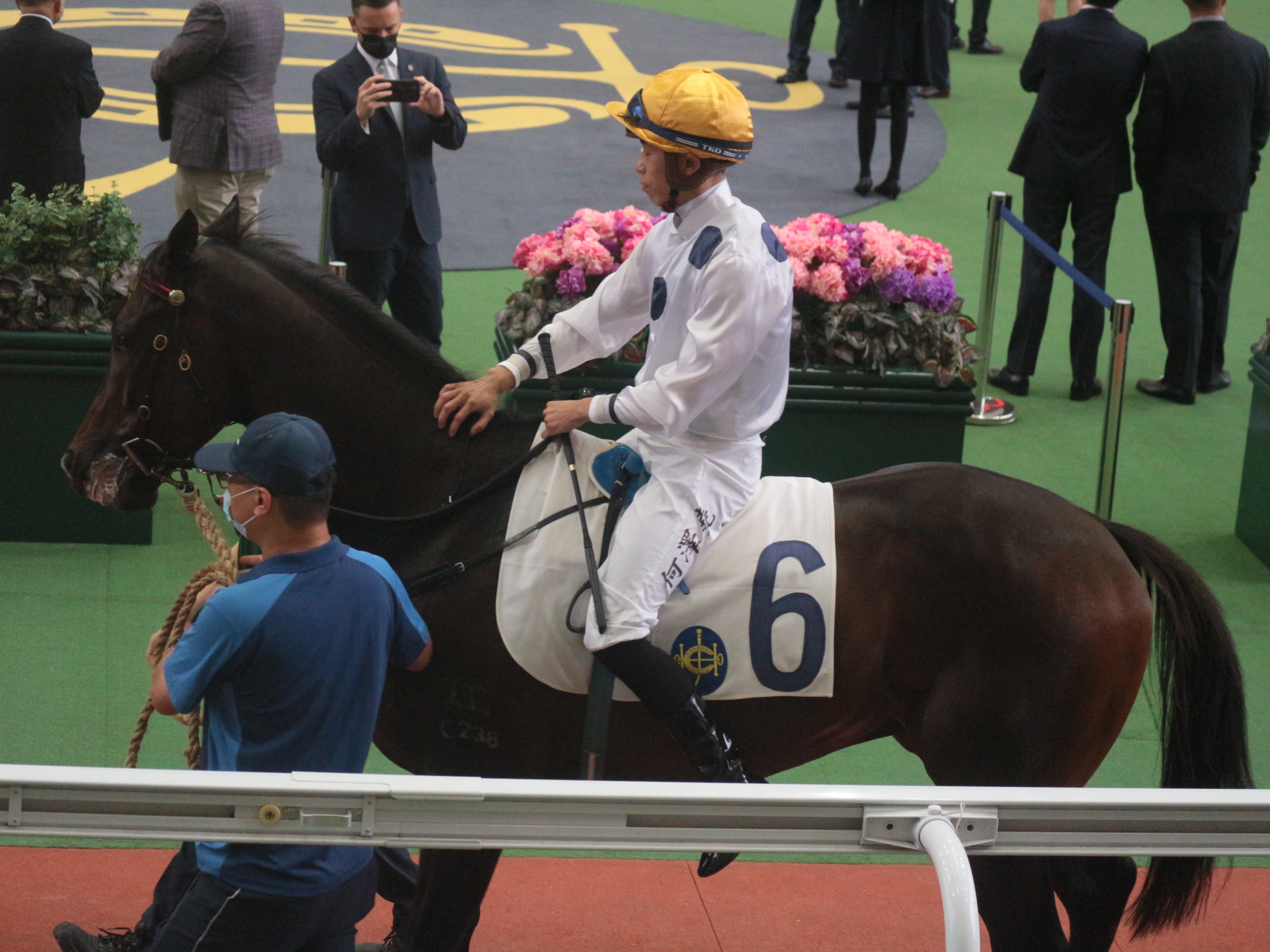
Golden Sixty in the Shatin Racecourse on 27 September 2020, guided by jockey Vincent C Y Ho

Golden Sixty is a brown horse with a white star and snip and white socks on his hind legs bred in Australia by Asco International Pty Ltd. In January 2017 the yearling was consigned to the Gold Coast Magic Millions Yearling Sale and was bought for A$120,000 by the New Zealand bloodstock company Riversley Park. In November 2017 at Karaka, the colt was put up for auction in the New Zealand Bloodstock Ready to Run Sale and was sold to the Hong Kong-based trainer Francis Lui Kin Wai for NZ$300,000. The colt was gelded and sent to Hong Kong where he was taken into training by Lui and entered the ownership of Stanley Chan Ka Leung. As of April 2021, he has been ridden in all of his starts by Vincent Ho Chak-Yiu and raced exclusively at Sha Tin Racecourse.

He was from the tenth crop of foals sired by the American stallion Medaglia d'Oro, whose wins included the Travers Stakes, Whitney Handicap, and Donn Handicap. Medaglia d'Oro became a very successful breeding stallion whose other foals have included Rachel Alexandra, Songbird and Talismanic. Golden Sixty's dam Gaudeamus was a Kentucky-bred mare who showed high-class form in Ireland, winning three races including the Debutante Stakes. She was a granddaughter of the 1000 Guineas runner-up Konafa, whose other descendants have included Hector Protector and Bosra Sham.

== Racing career ==
=== 2018-2019: Three-year-old season ===
Golden Sixty made his debut in the Castle Bay Peak Handicap over 1200 metres on 31 March 2019 for which he was assigned a weight of 123 pounds based on his track work. Going off the 1.7/1 favourite he recovered from a poor start to take the lead in the closing stages and won by one and a half lengths from Shining Ace. On 28 April he started favourite for a more valuable handicap over the same distance and won by a neck from Lockheed after coming from sixth place on the final turn. In a similar event on 8 June he won again, taking the lead in the closing stages and beating Mr Croissant by half a length. On his final run of the season the gelding was stepped up to 1400 metres and started favourite for a handicap race on 7 July but came home tenth behind Star Performance after being hampered in the closing stages. Francis Lui explained that Golden Sixty had raced too freely in the early stages and was already beaten when the interference occurred.

=== 2019-2020: Four-year-old season ===
On his first appearance of the new season Golden Sixty was assigned 130 pounds for the 1200 metre Sunset Peak Handicap on 1 September and produced a strong late run to beat Mr Croissant by one and a quarter lengths. In a 1400-metre handicap on 20 October the gelding won again, coming from well off the pace to take the lead in the closing stages and prevail by one and a quarter lengths from Encouraging with The Hulk three and a half lengths back in third place. On 23 November, in a similar event over the same distance, Golden Sixty won by one and a quarter lengths from Lucky Hero under top weight of 133 pounds. On 1 January 2020 Golden Sixty was stepped up to Group 3 class for the Chinese Club Challenge Cup over 1400 metres in an eight-runner field. Starting the odds-on favourite he won by two lengths from Fat Turtle after producing a strong late run from the rear of the field. After the race Francis Lui said, "I am happy to see him run like that... he has a very big fighting heart, you can see every race he tries his best."

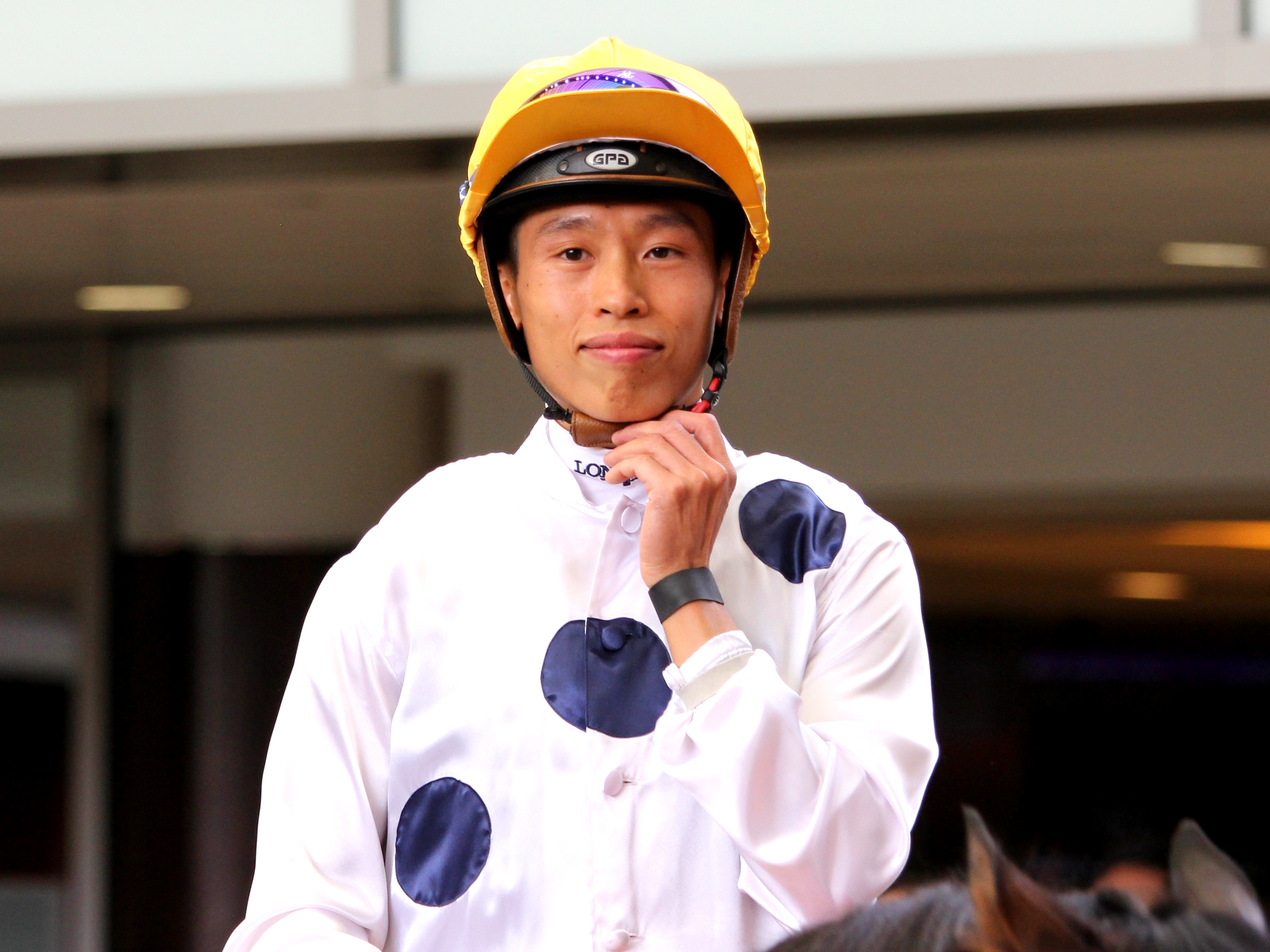
Golden Sixty in the Shatin Racecourse on 30 April 2023, for the Champions Mile race at the FWD Champions Day 2023, guided by his regular jockey Vincent C Y Ho

Golden Sixty was then aimed at the Hong Kong Four-Year-Old Classic Series, a trio of contests for four-year-olds trained in Hong Kong. On 27 January he started favourite for the Hong Kong Classic Mile with the best fancied of his eight opponents being his stablemate More Than This and Beauty Legacy (winner of the Autumn Stakes). After settling behind the leaders on the inside he switched to the outside 400 metres from the finish, took the lead in the closing stages and won "readily" by one and a quarter lengths from More Than This. Twenty-eight days after his win in the Classic Mile, the gelding was stepped up in distance for the Hong Kong Classic Cup over 1800 metres and, despite contacting a fever two weeks before the race, started favourite ahead of More Than This and Beauty Legacy, with the best of the other seven runners appearing to be the Lion Rock Trophy winner Champion's Way. Golden Sixty raced towards the rear before making a forward move 400 metres out, and after briefly struggling to obtain a clear passage, he ran down the leaders, caught Champion's Way in the last 50 metres and won by half a length. Lui commented "He is a tough horse, everybody knows he got a temperature two weeks ago, but he still performed today. I was very worried. I tried everything [to get him here], finally we made it here. He jumped and he followed the other horses, he relaxed well like last time. I am happy with that because before the race I worried that there was no pace in it."

On 22 March Golden Sixty was moved up in trip for the 2000 metre Hong Kong Derby, when he attempted to become the second horse, after Rapper Dragon, to win all three legs of the Four-Year-Old Classic Series. He went off the odds-on favourite ahead of More Than This and Champion's Way with only one of the other eleven runners starting at less than 24/1. He raced towards the rear before moving up on the wide outside entering the straight by which time the 290/1 outsider Playa Del Puente had rushed several lengths clear of the field. Golden Sixty produced a sustained late run, caught Playa Del Puente in the final strides and won by a neck. After the race Lui said "I'm very happy, I have to say thank you to my stable team and everybody who has supported me. It's not easy when you have this kind of good horse... I could see round the bend they slowed down the pace, that's why the other horse went to the front."

At the Hong Kong's Champion Awards ceremony in July 2020, Golden Sixty was named Champion Four-Year-Old and Most Popular Horse of the Year.

=== 2020-2021: Five-year-old season ===
Golden Sixty began his third campaign in the Group 3 Celebration Cup over 1400 metres on 27 September when he was matched against the two-time Hong Kong Horse of the Year Beauty Generation, from whom he received seventeen pounds in weight. Starting the 4/5 favourite he came from the rear of the field to take the lead approaching the last 100 metres and won by one and a quarter lengths from Beauty Generation and Champion's Way who dead-heated for second place. Vincent Ho commented "It's very exciting to be back on him. He felt great and fresh today. Once I got a clear run, I knew he'd run them down... I think he was around 70 to 75% fit before this run and after this he should go up even more". Three weeks later the gelding started odds-on favourite for the Group 2 Sha Tin Trophy over 1600 metres and won again as he ran down the front-running outsider in the final strides to win by half a length. The Champions Mile winner Southern Legend came home third ahead of Champion's Way with Beauty Generation finishing sixth. After riding the horse to his ninth consecutive win Ho said "He's come on really well and today he settled a lot more, really well behind the gate and inside the gate, he was so relaxed and with each run his fitness is coming on. He does switch off. Two, maybe three strides after he hits the front, he always does. That's why he never wins by huge margins." In the Group 2 Jockey Club Mile on 22 November Golden Sixty started odds-on favourite and took his winning streak to ten as he produced a strong run on the outside to take the lead 200 meters from the finish and won by one and a half lengths and a neck from Ka Ying Star and Southern Legend. Ho commented "I've never been in a Formula 1 car but I feel like riding him it’s probably similar. He's a once-in-a-lifetime horse for me."

On 13 December Golden Sixty was matched against international competition in the Hong Kong Mile and started the odds-on favourite in a ten-runner field. The overseas contingent comprised Admire Mars from Japan and the Irish runners Order of Australia and Romanised while the locally trained contenders included Beauty Generation, Ka Ying Star, Southern Legend and Waikuku (Stewards' Cup). After being restrained towards the year, Golden Sixty made "smooth progress" on the outside, overtook Admire Mars approaching the last 200 metres and won "readily" by two lengths from Southern Legend. Vincent Ho said "At the top of the straight I knew [I was going to win] because I was just cruising and I didn't think anyone could beat him. I really don't know what to say, it couldn’t be better. I'm grateful to give some positive energy to Hong Kong and the whole world in racing."

In the 2020 World's Best Racehorse Rankings, Golden Sixty was rated the equal tenth best racehorse in the world, six pounds behind the top-rated Ghaiyyath.

Golden Sixty began 2021 by starting 1/5 favourite for the Group 1 Stewards' Cup over 1600 metres on 24 January, when his rivals included Waikuku, Southern Legend, Ka Ying Star, Rise High (2019 Sha Tin Trophy), More Than This and Champion's Way. He produced his customary strong late run but after his saddle slipped in the straight he had to be "driven out" by Ho to win by a head from Southern Legend. After the race Ho said "the saddle slipped back a little bit at the 300 meters. It was still OK but it was not as comfortable for me and Golden Sixty, of course, but top athletes, top horses need to overcome all kind of different circumstances—something you can't predict but you have to ready for that." Four weeks later the gelding was stepped up in distance for the 2000 metre Hong Kong Gold Cup and went off the odds-on favourite in a seven-runner field. His opponents on this occasion included the 2020 Hong Kong Horse of the Year Exultant, Furore (2019 Hong Kong Derby) and Time Warp (2017 Hong Kong Cup). After settling towards the rear behind the front-running Time Warp, Golden Sixty moved up on the outside to take the lead 200 metres from the finish but was "hard pressed" by Furore in the closing stages before prevailing by a short head. Lui commented "My heart is pumping. When he first came into the straight I thought he would win easily. But when he got into a competition with the other horses, especially [Furore], it was tough," while Ho said "I was quite confident that I would stay ahead of them but we fought hard – it wasn’t easy it was a bit unexpected to be that close... he wanted to lay in so it was difficult for me."

On 25 April Golden Sixty attempted to take his winning run to fourteen in the Champions Mile and started the 1/5 favourite against five opponents, namely Southern Legend, More Than This, Ka Ying Star, Healthy Happy (Hong Kong Classic Cup) and Mighty Giant (Chairman's Trophy). He settled towards the rear before moving up on the outside to take the lead 400 metres from the finish but after opening up a clear lead he was strongly challenged by the fast-finishing More Than This in the closing stages and "just held on" to win by a head. Vincent Ho explained "Usually, it takes a while for him to pick up but today they went dead slow. When I pulled out at the 600m, we were almost alongside them when I hit the straight. We learned that he can fight when something is chasing him, not just when he is doing the chasing, which is good... hopefully he can have a break now until next season. He’s had a couple of tough runs."

=== 2021-2022: Six-year-old season ===
Golden Sixty won the Jockey Club Mile and Hong Kong Mile for the second year in a row and increased his unbeaten run to 16. And he claimed 19 wins which broke the 18 wins record made by Silent Witness and kept by Beauty Generation. Golden Sixty had become the racing horse with the most victories since the professionalization of Hong Kong horseracing in 1971.

Golden Sixty was defeated in Steward's Cup 2022 by Waikuku, failed to catch up the 17 consecutive victory record made by Silent Witness, as well as the 23 consecutive victory record made by the 1930s racehorse Liberty Bay. And then got beaten again in Hong Kong Gold Cup 2022 by Russian Emperor and Savvy Nine. Golden Sixty won again in Chairman's Trophy and Champions Mile 2022. He broke the highest prize money earnings record made by Beauty Generation.

After the victory in Champions Mile 2022, Golden Sixty received the invitation from JRA to race in Yasuda Kinen 2022 and his owner Stanley Chan Ka Leung and trainer Francis Lui accepted the offer. However, Chan and Lui eventually decided that Golden Sixty would not race in Yasuda Kinen 2022 after discussion, and Golden Sixty's regular jockey Vincent C Y Ho expressed disappointment for this decision and believed that Golden Sixty deserves a lot more than this.

=== 2022-2023: Seven-year-old season ===
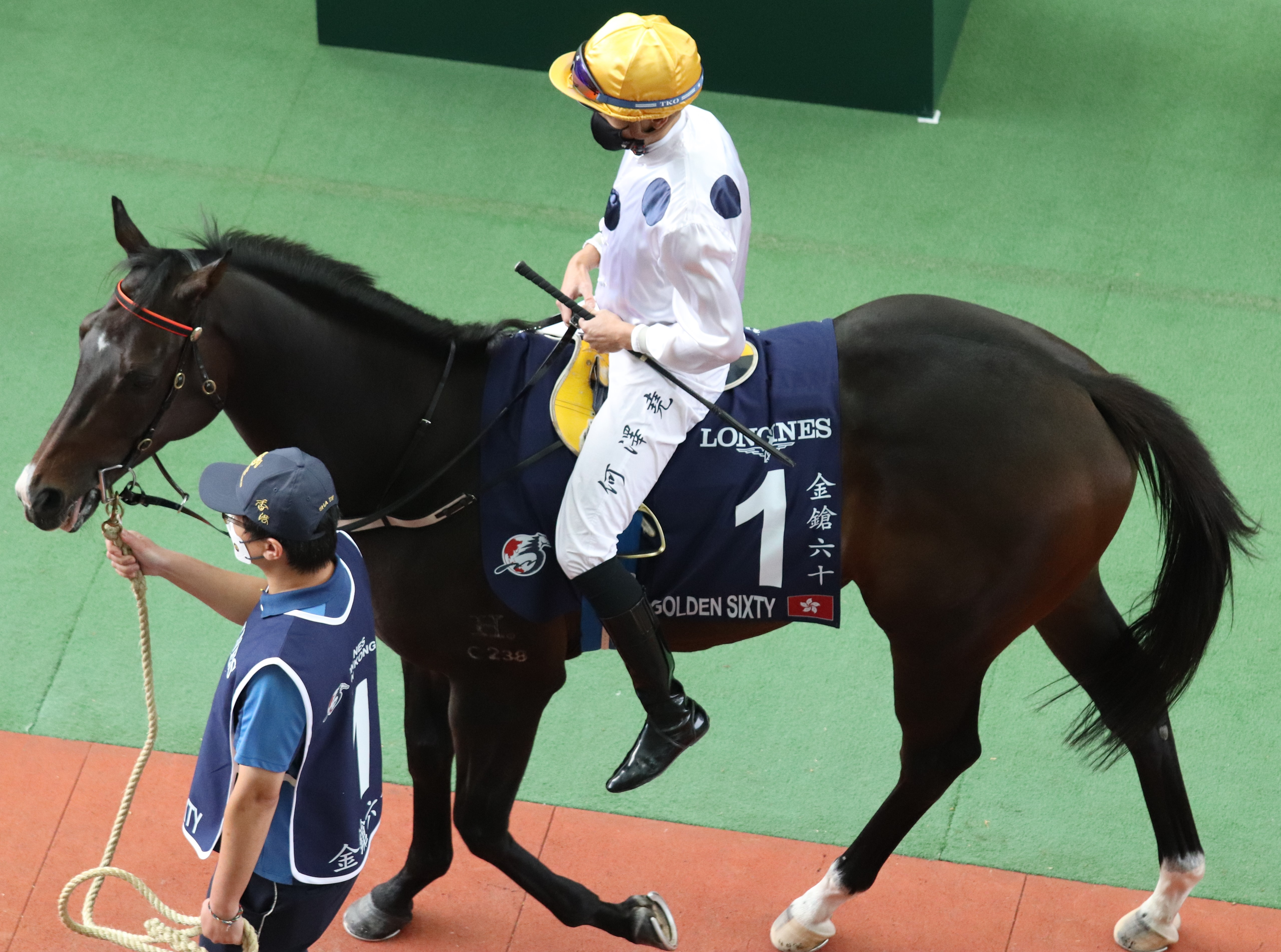
Golden Sixty, guided by Vincent C Y Ho, competed in the Hong Kong Mile race on 11 December 2022

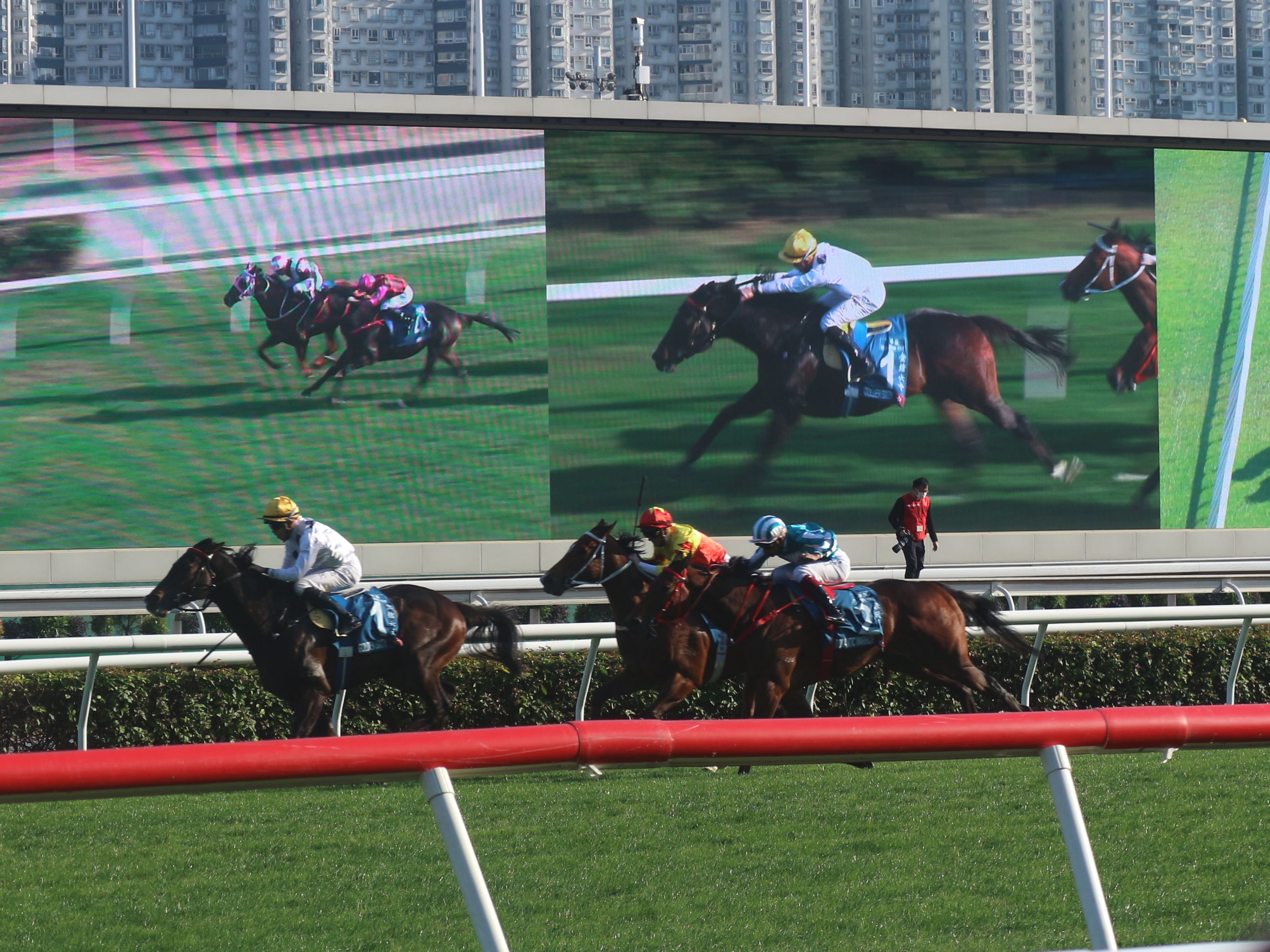
On 29 January 2023, Golden Sixty defeated California Spangle in the Hong Kong Stewards' Cup race

Golden Sixty defeated California Spangle and won the Jockey Club Mile for the third year in a row, claiming his 22nd win. But he was then defeated by California Spangle in the Hong Kong Mile.

Golden Sixty raced in the Hong Kong Stewards' Cup for the third time and defeated Romantic Warrior to claim his 23rd win, which equals the record of 23 wins in Hong Kong held by the 1930s racehorse Liberty Bay.

Golden Sixty raced in the Hong Kong Gold Cup for the third time and defeated Romantic Warrior again to claim his 24th win, which surpasses Liberty Bay's 85-year record of 23 Hong Kong wins, making Golden Sixty the racehorse with the most wins in Hong Kong horse racing history.

On 9 March 2023, Golden Sixty ranked first with a score of 125 in the Longines World's Best Racehorse Rankings.

On 30 April 2023, Golden Sixty claimed his third consecutive win in the Champions Mile, marking not only his 25th win but also his 9th international Group One win, which surpasses Beauty Generation's record of 8 international Group One wins. Golden Sixty also becomes the racehorse with the most prize money earnings in the world, breaking the record made by Winx.

On 14 July 2023, Golden Sixty claimed his third consecutive title as the Hong Kong Horse of the Year, becoming the first racehorse to achieve this record in Hong Kong racing history. Golden Sixty also gained his third consecutive title as the Hong Kong Champion Miler and his fourth consecutive title as the Hong Kong Most Popular Horse of the Year.

=== 2023-2024: Eight-year-old season ===
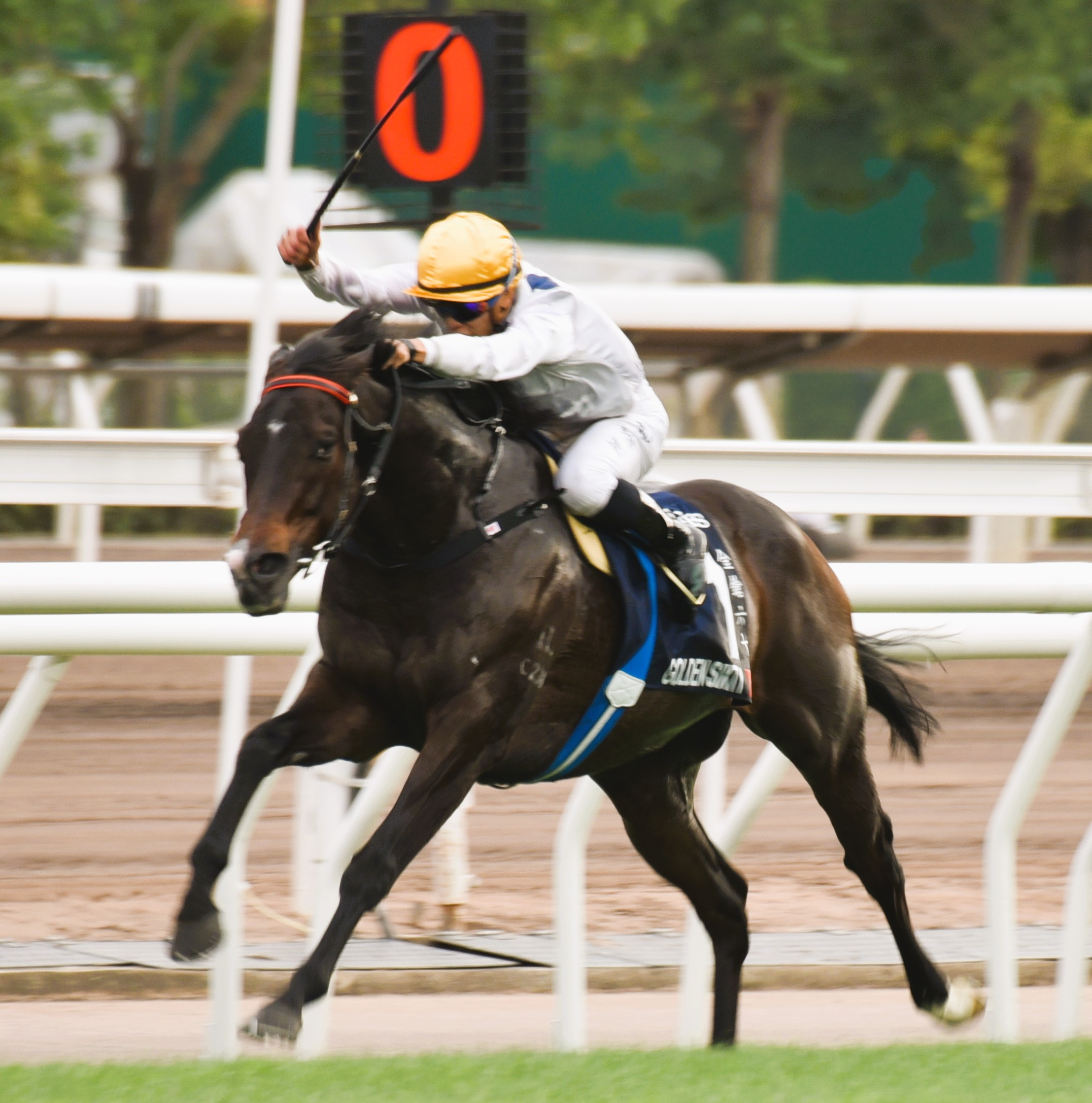
Golden Sixty claimed his third win in the Hong Kong Mile on 10 December 2023

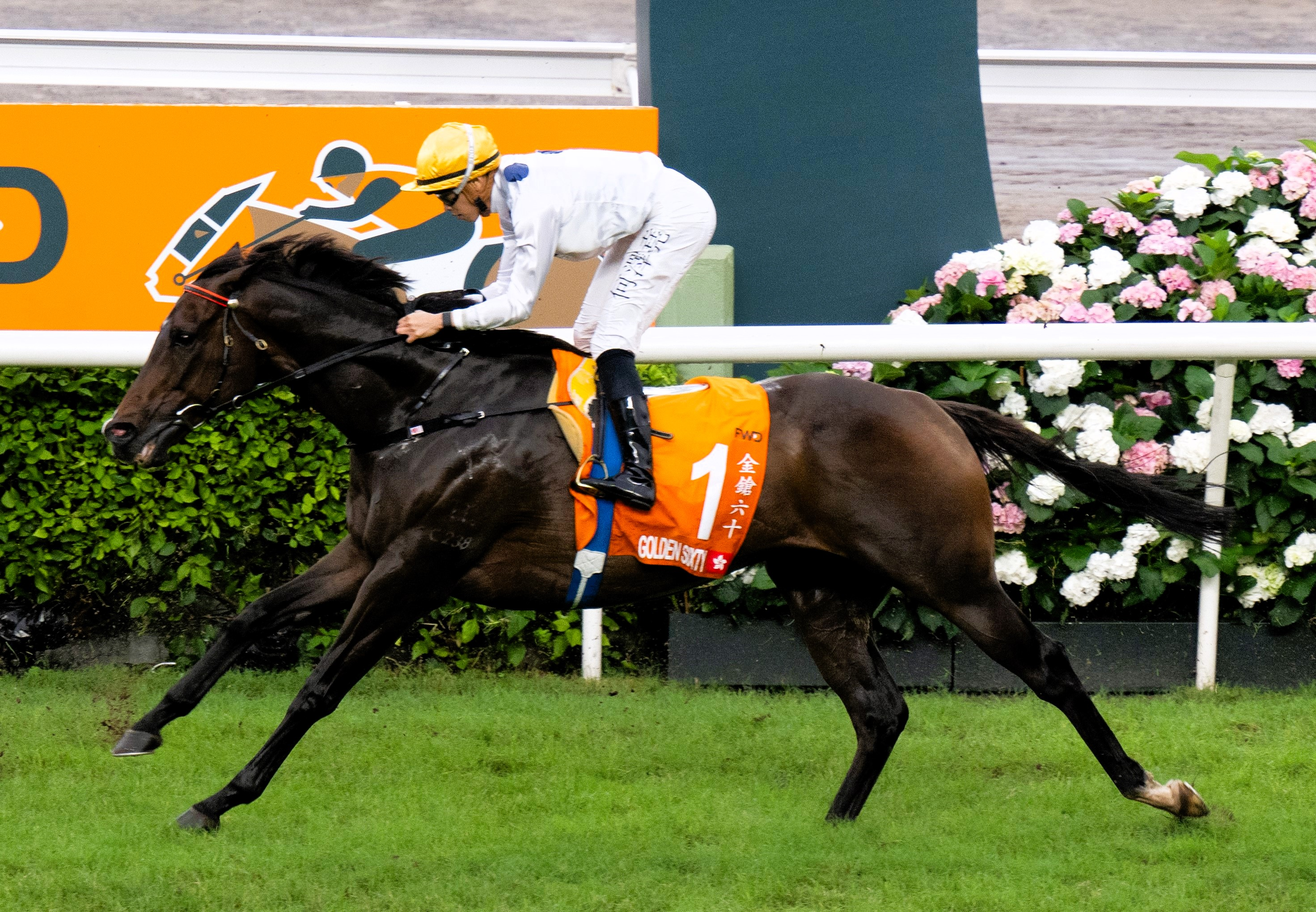
Golden Sixty in the Shatin Racecourse on 28 April 2024, participating in the Champions Mile race at the Champions Day 2024 raceday, guided by jockey Vincent C Y Ho

On 10 December 2023, Golden Sixty claimed his third win in the Hong Kong Mile, marking his 26th win as he joined Good Ba Ba as the three-time winner of this race. For Golden Sixty, this is also his 10th international Group One win.

On 28 April 2024, defeated by Beauty Eternal, Golden Sixty finished fourth in his fourth race in the Champions Mile, ending his record of finishing in the top three positions in 26 consecutive races since the 2019-2020 racing season.

On 12 July 2024, Golden Sixty gained his fourth consecutive title as the Hong Kong Champion Miler.

=== 2024-2025: Nine-year-old season and retirement ===
On 13 September 2024, the Hong Kong Jockey Club officially announced Golden Sixty's retirement, ending his racing career of more than five years. In recognition of his legendary achievements in Hong Kong and international horse racing, the Hong Kong Jockey Club awarded him the "Lifetime Achievement Award" in the name of The Champion Awards on 22 September, with a farewell ceremony held in the Shatin Racecourse.

For his retirement, Golden Sixty was quarantined in Australia, before pensioned at the Northern Horse Park located in Tomakomai, making him the first Hong Kong racehorse to be retired in Japan.

== Pedigree ==
Pedigree of Golden Sixty (AUS), brown gelding, 2015
Sire Medaglia d'Oro (USA) 1999	El Prado (IRE); 1989	Sadler's Wells (USA); 1981	Northern Dancer (CAN); 1961
Sire Medaglia d'Oro (USA) 1999	El Prado (IRE); 1989	Sadler's Wells (USA); 1981	Fairy Bridge (USA); 1975
Sire Medaglia d'Oro (USA) 1999	El Prado (IRE); 1989	Lady Capulet (USA); 1974	Sir Ivor (USA); 1965
Sire Medaglia d'Oro (USA) 1999	El Prado (IRE); 1989	Lady Capulet (USA); 1974	Caps and Bells (USA); 1958
Sire Medaglia d'Oro (USA) 1999	Cappucino Bay (USA); 1989	Bailjumper (USA); 1974	Damascus (USA); 1964
Sire Medaglia d'Oro (USA) 1999	Cappucino Bay (USA); 1989	Bailjumper (USA); 1974	Court Circuit (USA); 1964
Sire Medaglia d'Oro (USA) 1999	Cappucino Bay (USA); 1989	Dubbed In (USA); 1973	Silent Screen (USA); 1967
Sire Medaglia d'Oro (USA) 1999	Cappucino Bay (USA); 1989	Dubbed In (USA); 1973	Society Singer (USA); 1968
Dam Gaudeamus (USA) 1998	Distorted Humor (USA); 1987	Forty Niner (USA); 1985	Mr Prospector (USA); 1970
Dam Gaudeamus (USA) 1998	Distorted Humor (USA); 1987	Forty Niner (USA); 1985	File (USA); 1976
Dam Gaudeamus (USA) 1998	Distorted Humor (USA); 1987	Danzig's Beauty (USA); 1987	Danzig (USA); 1977
Dam Gaudeamus (USA) 1998	Distorted Humor (USA); 1987	Danzig's Beauty (USA); 1987	Sweetest Chant (USA); 1978
Dam Gaudeamus (USA) 1998	Leo's Lucky Lady (USA); 1992	Seattle Slew (USA); 1974	Bold Reasoning (USA); 1968
Dam Gaudeamus (USA) 1998	Leo's Lucky Lady (USA); 1992	Seattle Slew (USA); 1974	My Charmer (USA); 1969
Dam Gaudeamus (USA) 1998	Leo's Lucky Lady (USA); 1992	Konafa (CAN); 1973	Damascus (USA); 1964
Dam Gaudeamus (USA) 1998	Leo's Lucky Lady (USA); 1992	Konafa (CAN); 1973	Royal Statute (Family: 22-b) (CAN); 1969

- Golden Sixty is inbred 4 × 4 to Damascus, meaning that this stallion appears twice in the fourth generation of his pedigree.
