= Sha Tin Trophy =

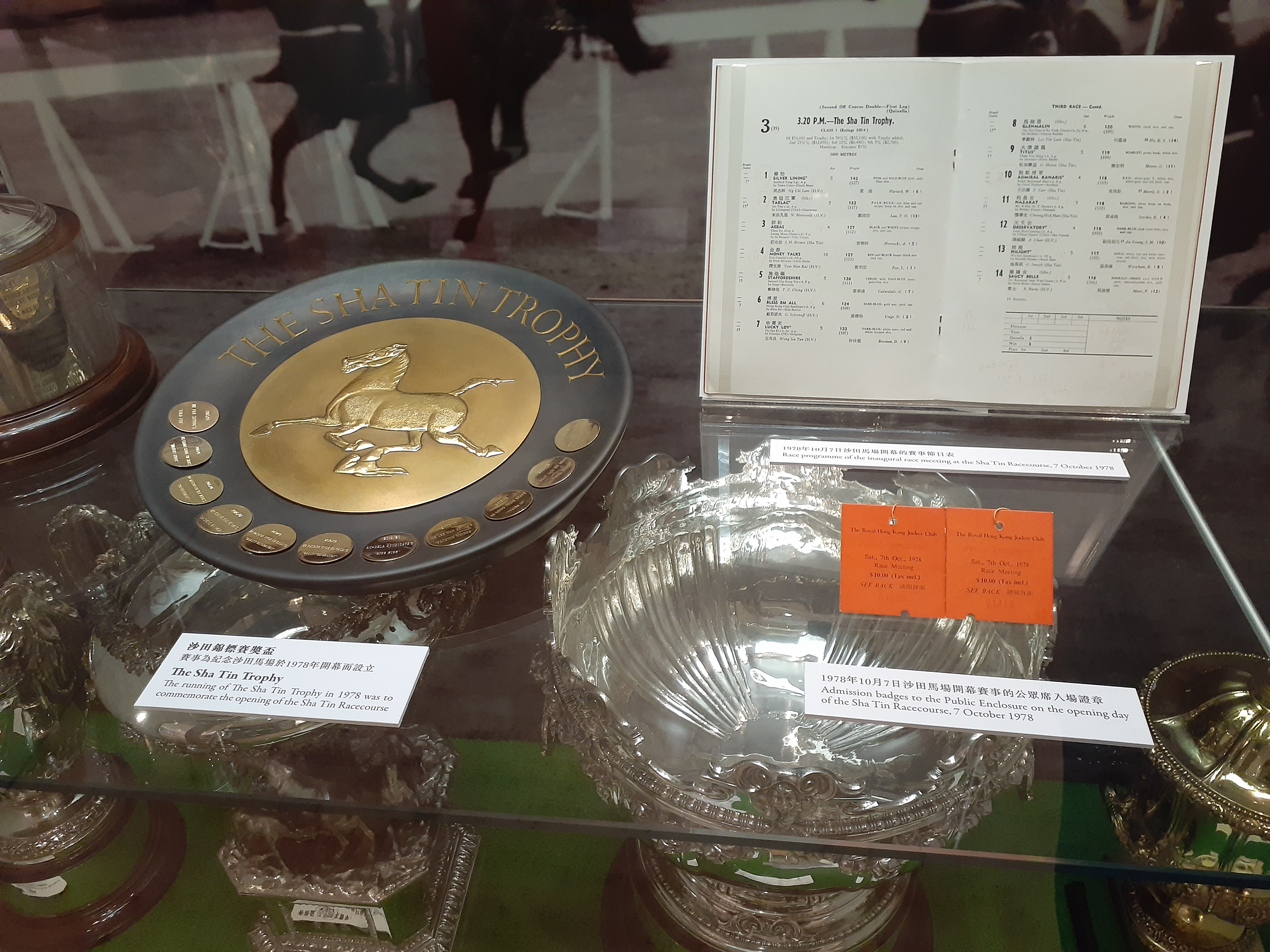
- Trophy of Sha Tin Trophy, as exhibited at the Hong Kong Racing Museum
- Class: Group 2
- Location: Sha Tin Racecourse
- Inaugurated: 1997
- Race type: Thoroughbred – Flat racing

Race information
- Distance: 1,600 metres
- Surface: Turf
- Track: Right-handed
- Qualification: 4-y-o+
- Purse: HK$4,250,000

The Sha Tin Trophy is a Group 2 horse race for horses aged four and over, run at a distance of 1,600 metres (one mile) on turf in October at Sha Tin Racecourse in Hong Kong.

The Sha Tin Trophy was first contested in 1997. It was upgraded to International Group 2 class in 2016.

== Records ==
Record time:

- 1:32.82 – Rise High 2019

Most successful horse:

- 2 – Beauty Generation 2017, 2018
- 2 – California Spangle 2022, 2023

Most wins by a jockey:

- 4 – Zac Purton 2012, 2014, 2018, 2022

Most wins by a trainer:

- 5 – John Moore 2005, 2006, 2006, 2017, 2018

== Winners ==
Year	Winner	Age	Jockey	Trainer	Time
1997	Smashing Pumpkin	4	Basil Marcus	David Hayes	1:34.50
1998	Indigenous	5	Eric Saint-Martin	Ivan Allan	1:35.20
1999	Desert Fox	4	Alan Munro	David Oughton	1:34.60
2000	Billion Win	6	Mark De Montfort	Gary Ng Ting-keung	1:33.90
2001	Shaxi Fortune	5	Steven King	Francis Lui Kin-wai	1:34.20
2002	Super Molly	5	Douglas Whyte	David Hayes	1:34.70
2003	Self Flit	5	Weichong Marwing	Ivan Allan	1:34.20
2004	Ain't Here	5	Brett Prebble	David Hayes	1:34.00
2005	Best Gift	4	Howard Cheng Yue-tin	John Moore	1:34.20
2006	Green Treasure	6	Shane Dye	Caspar Fownes	1:33.50
2007	Down Town	5	Douglas Whyte	Dennis Yip Chor-hong	1:33.10
2008	Viva Pataca	6	Darren Beadman	John Moore	1:34.71
2009	Packing Winner	7	Brett Doyle	Peter Ho Leung	1:34.67
2010	Thumbs Up	6	Brett Doyle	Caspar Fownes	1:33.56
2011	California Memory	5	Matthew Chadwick	Tony Cruz	1:34.75
2012	Ambitious Dragon	6	Zac Purton	Tony Millard	1:33.59
2013	Gold-Fun	4	Olivier Doleuze	Richard Gibson	1:34.05
2014	Military Attack	6	Zac Purton	Caspar Fownes	1:34.37
2015	Contentment	5	João Moreira	John Size	1:33.79
2016	Designs On Rome	6	Karis Teetan	John Moore	1:35.36
2017	Beauty Generation	5	Derek Leung Ka-chun	John Moore	1:33.56
2018	Beauty Generation	6	Zac Purton	John Moore	1:33.07
2019	Rise High	5	Vincent Ho Chak-yiu	Caspar Fownes	1:32.82
2020	Golden Sixty	5	Vincent Ho Chak-yiu	Francis Lui Kin-wai	1:33.37
2021	Panfield	5	Karis Teetan	Tony Millard	1:34.40
2022	California Spangle	4	Zac Purton	Tony Cruz	1:33.41
2023	California Spangle	5	Hugh Bowman	Tony Cruz	1:34.18
2024	Galaxy Patch	5	Vincent Ho Chak-yiu	Pierre Ng Pang-chi	1:33.49
2025	My Wish	5	Alexis Badel	Mark Newnham	1:32.55
2026	Light Years Charm	6	Karis Teetan	David Eustace	1:32.42

== See also ==
- List of Hong Kong horse races
