= Rapper Dragon =

Australian-bred Thoroughbred racehorse

- Sire: Street Boss
- Grandsire: Street Cry
- Dam: Swing Dance
- Damsire: Danehill Dancer
- Sex: Gelding
- Foaled: 27 August 2012
- Country: Australia
- Colour: Chestnut
- Breeder: Eduardo Cojuangco
- Owner: Eduardo Cojuangco; Albert Hung Chao Hong
- Trainer: Gai Waterhouse; John Moore
- Record: 18: 9-3-0
- Earnings: HK$30,349,500

Major wins
- Lion Rock Trophy (2016); Hong Kong Classic Mile (2017); Hong Kong Classic Cup (2017); Hong Kong Derby (2017); Chairman's Trophy (2017)

Awards
- H. K. Champ. Middle-distance Horse (2017); H. K. Most Popular Horse of the Year (2017); Hong Kong Horse of the Year (2017)

Rapper Dragon, (Chinese: 佳龍駒, 27 August 2012 – 7 May 2017) was an Australian-bred Thoroughbred racehorse. When racing as a two-year-old in Australia he showed considerable promise as he won one race and finished second in both The Schweppervescence and Champagne Stakes.

After being gelded and sent to race in Hong Kong he ran well as a three-year-old, making steady improvement and ending his second season with a win in the Lion Rock Trophy. In the following season he was the dominant racehorse in Hong Kong, taking the Hong Kong Classic Mile, Hong Kong Classic Cup, Hong Kong Derby and Chairman's Trophy but sustained a fatal injury in the Champions Mile. He was posthumously named Hong Kong Horse of the Year.

== Background ==
Rapper Dragon was a chestnut horse with a narrow white blaze bred by Eduardo Cojuangco at his Gooree Park stud at Mudgee, New South Wales. Cojuangco named the colt Street Rapper and sent him into training with Gai Waterhouse.

He was sired by Street Boss, a sprinter who won the Bing Crosby Handicap and the Triple Bend Handicap in 2008. The best of his other progeny have included Cathryn Sophia, Danza (Arkansas Derby) and The Quarterback (Newmarket Handicap). Rapper Dragon's dam Swing Dance was an unraced half-sister to the Queen of the Turf Stakes winner Amanpour and a female-line descendant of Natalma.

== Racing career ==
=== 2014/2015: two-year-old season ===
Street Rapper began his track career at Randwick Racecourse where he finished fourth in a 1000 metres race on 24 January 2015 and seventh in the Listed Lonhro Plate three weeks later. On 5 March at Wyong he recorded his first success as he won a two-year-old handicap by more than three lengths at odds of 2.6/1. After finishing runner-up in the Group 3 The Schweppervescence at Rosehill Racecourse he ended his first campaign by running second to Pasadena Girl in the Group 1 Champagne Stakes at Randwick on 18 April.

=== 2015/2016: three-year-old season ===
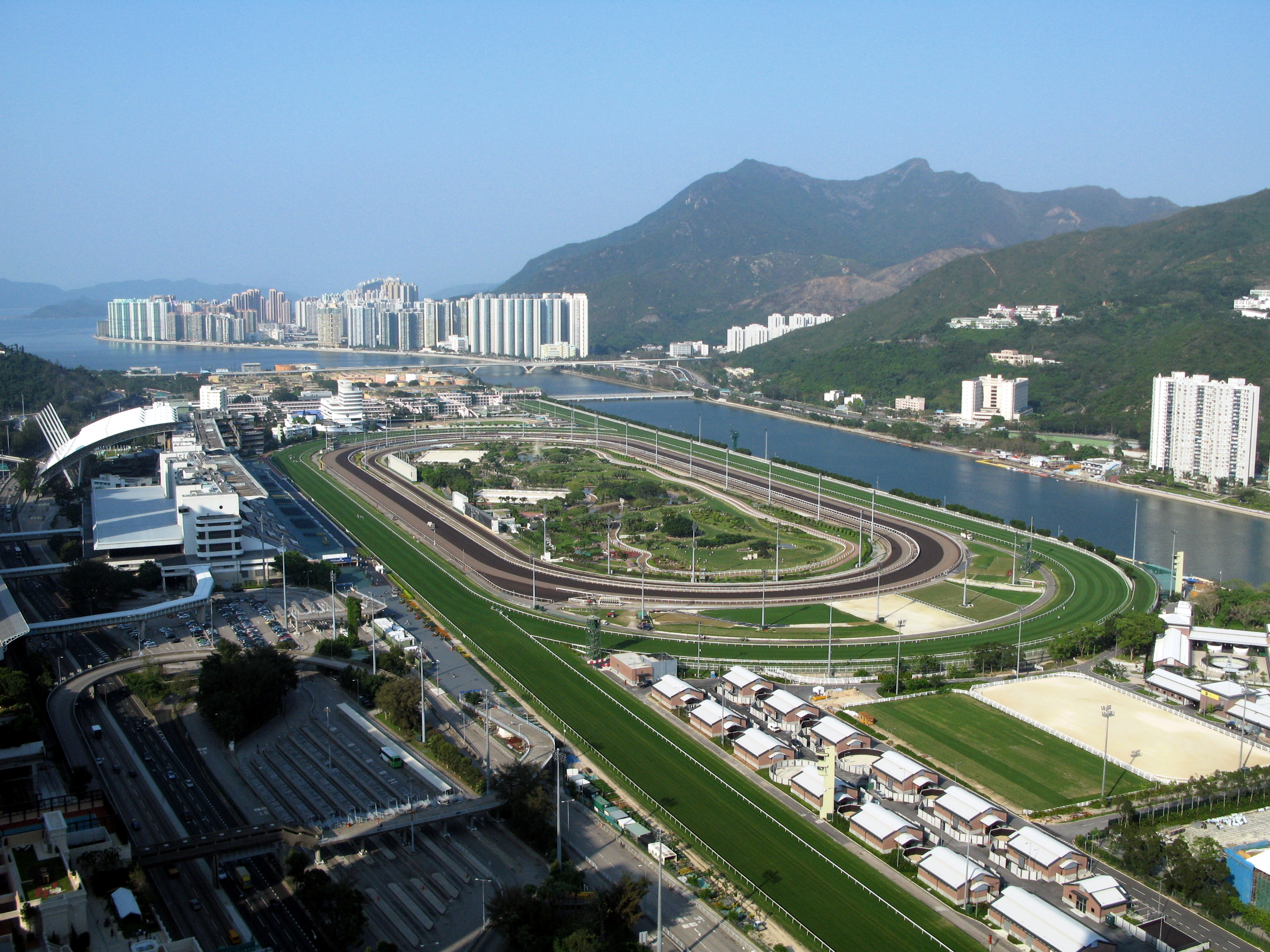
Sha Tin Racecourse, the location for most of Beauty Generation's races

At the end of his first season Street Rapper was bought privately by the trainer John Moore on behalf of Albert Hung Chao Hong and was exported to Hong Kong where the colt was gelded and renamed Rapper Dragon. All but the first of his Hong Kong races took place at Sha Tin Racecourse. Rapper Dragon finished unplaced in his first two races for his new connections before narrowly winning a minor handicap race over 1400 metres on 21 February. In this race he was partnered for the first time by João Moreira, who became his regular jockey.

The gelding began to make steady progress, finishing second under 128 pounds in the Viva Pataca Handicap and then winning the Primula Handicap over 1600 metres on 28 March. In the Sports For All Handicap on 16 April he came from last place 400 metres from the finish to win going away by one and a half lengths from Romantic Touch. On his final appearance of the season the gelding was stepped up in class to contest the Group 3 Lion Rock Trophy on 29 May and started favourite ahead of Helene Paragon (Hong Kong Stewards' Cup). After being settled in mid-division, Rapper Dragon made rapid progress on the outside in the straight, took the lead 200 metres from the finish and won by one and a quarter lengths from Beauty Only. Moreira said that the gelding appeared to be an outstanding prospect commenting "I will win a Group 1 on Rapper Dragon – I would never normally say that about any young horse, but I am so confident that this horse will win a Group 1. Mentally, he is not 100 per cent yet and look what he is doing".

=== 2016/2017: four-year-old season ===
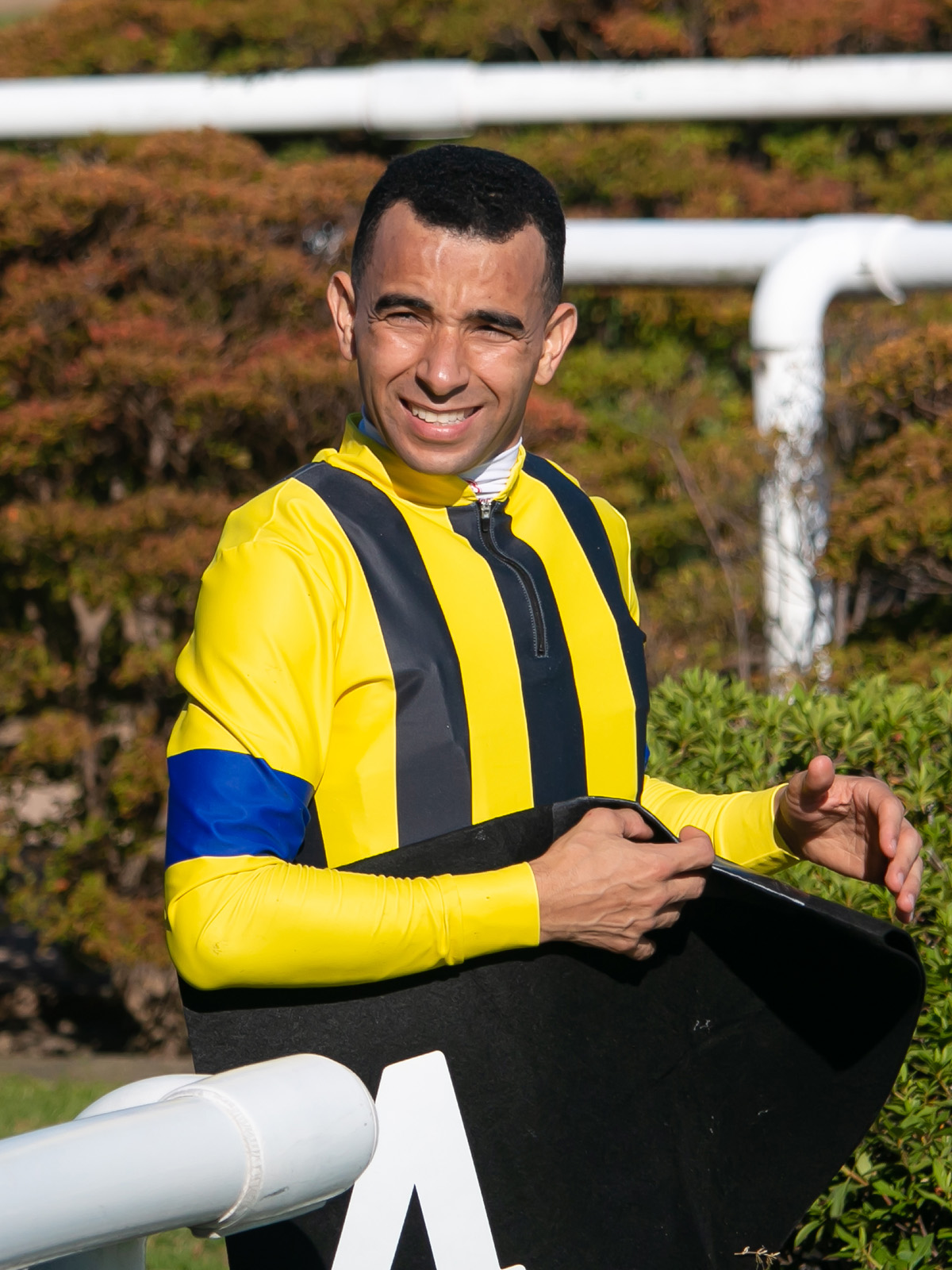
João Moreira, Rapper Dragon's regular jockey

Rapper Dragon was scheduled to begin his four-year-old campaign in the Sha Tin Trophy on 23 October but was withdrawn from the race after sustaining an injury to his right hind leg. He resumed his season in December when he finished fifth behind Blizzard in the Flying Dancer Handicap. In the Hong Kong Classic Mile for four-year-olds on 22 January 2017 he started the 1.1/1 favourite against thirteen opponents headed by Pakistan Star, Beauty Generation and Eagle Way (Queensland Derby). After racing just behind the leaders Rapper Dragon accelerated into the lead approaching the final furlong and won "comfortably" by two lengths from Seasons Bloom. Moore commented "I've been telling the press for weeks that this is the cleanest-winded horse I've had in the stable for donkeys' years and, from that point of view, he was very easy to get fit... I didn’t expect that he would win that easily".

Four weeks later the gelding moved up to 1800 metres for the Hong Kong Classic Cup and was made the odds-on favourite in a fourteen-runner field which included Seasons Bloom, Pakistan Star, Beauty Generation and Eagle Way. He raced in mid-division before accelerating in the straight, taking the lead just over 200 metres from the finish and winning by one and a half lengths from Pakistan Star. On 19 March Rapper Dragon stepped up in distance again and started 0.8/1 favourite for the Hong Kong Derby over 2000 metres. Following his wins in the Mile and the Cup he was attempting to become the first horse to win all three legs of the Hong Kong Four-year-old Classic Series. The field included his old rivals Pakistan Star, Beauty Generation, Eagle Way and Seasons Bloom as well as the strongly fancied British import Gold Mount. In a race run in heavy rain, Rapper Dragon was among the leaders from the start, accelerated into the lead in the straight and came home one and three quarter lengths clear of Pakistan Star. After the race Moore said "This is a really classy animal, he's done everything right, he progressed through the classes, today was the grand final and we won it... there was a moment or two there when he probably was in a tight position but he extricated himself and hit the line like he usually does – really, really strongly."

Rapper Dragon was then dropped back to 1600 metres on 9 April for the Chairman's Trophy in which he faced a strong field of older horses including Werther (Queen Elizabeth II Cup), Beauty Only, Helene Paragon, Blazing Speed (Champions & Chater Cup) and Designs On Rome. Starting the 0.6/1 favourite he raced in second place behind Contentment before taking the lead in the straight and held off the strong late challenge of Beauty Only to win by half a length. On 7 May Rapper Dragon started odds-on favourite for the Champions Mile. He began to struggle approaching half way and was pulled up by Moreira. He was immediately transferred to the track's veterinary hospital where he was euthanised after an examination revealed a major and complicated pelvic fracture.

At the Hong Kong Jockey Club Champion Awards in July 2017 Rapper Dragon was posthumously named Champion Middle-distance Horse, Most Popular Horse of the Year and Hong Kong Horse of the Year.

In the 2017 World's Best Racehorse Rankings, Rapper Dragon was rated the fifty-ninth best horse in the world with a rating of 119.

== Pedigree ==
Pedigree of Rapper Dragon (AUS), chestnut gelding, 2012
Sire Street Boss (USA) 2004	Street Cry (IRE); 1998	Machiavellian (USA)	Mr. Prospector
Sire Street Boss (USA) 2004	Street Cry (IRE); 1998	Machiavellian (USA)	Coup de Folie
Sire Street Boss (USA) 2004	Street Cry (IRE); 1998	Helen Street (GB)	Troy
Sire Street Boss (USA) 2004	Street Cry (IRE); 1998	Helen Street (GB)	Waterway (FR)
Sire Street Boss (USA) 2004	Blushing Ogygian; 1994	Ogygian	Damascus
Sire Street Boss (USA) 2004	Blushing Ogygian; 1994	Ogygian	Gonfalon
Sire Street Boss (USA) 2004	Blushing Ogygian; 1994	Fruhlingshochzeit	Blushing Groom (FR)
Sire Street Boss (USA) 2004	Blushing Ogygian; 1994	Fruhlingshochzeit	Fruhlingstag (FR)
Dam Swing Dance (AUS) 2005	Danehill Dancer (IRE); 1993	Danehill (USA)	Danzig
Dam Swing Dance (AUS) 2005	Danehill Dancer (IRE); 1993	Danehill (USA)	Razyana
Dam Swing Dance (AUS) 2005	Danehill Dancer (IRE); 1993	Mira Adonde (USA)	Sharpen Up (GB)
Dam Swing Dance (AUS) 2005	Danehill Dancer (IRE); 1993	Mira Adonde (USA)	Lettre d'Amour
Dam Swing Dance (AUS) 2005	Newscaster; 2000	Marscay	Biscay
Dam Swing Dance (AUS) 2005	Newscaster; 2000	Marscay	Heart of Market (USA)
Dam Swing Dance (AUS) 2005	Newscaster; 2000	Stormy Dream (USA)	Storm Cat
Dam Swing Dance (AUS) 2005	Newscaster; 2000	Stormy Dream (USA)	Natalma's Dream (Family: 2-d)
