= Celebration Cup =

- Class: Group 3
- Location: Sha Tin Racecourse
- Inaugurated: 2014
- Race type: Thoroughbred – Flat racing

Race information
- Distance: 1,400 metres
- Surface: Turf
- Track: Right-handed
- Qualification: 3-y-o+
- Purse: HK$3,250,000

The Celebration Cup, is a horse race for horses aged three and over, run at a distance of 1,400 metres (seven furlongs) on turf on 1 October (National Day of the People's Republic of China) at Sha Tin Racecourse in Hong Kong.

The Celebration Cup was first contested in 2014, and was upgraded to International Group 3 class in 2016.

== Records ==
Record time:

- 1:20.05 – Beauty Generation 2019

Most successful horse:

- 3 – Beauty Generation (2017, 2018, 2019)

Most wins by a jockey:

- 2 – João Moreira (2015, 2016)
- 2 – Zac Purton (2018, 2019)

Most wins by a trainer:

- 4 – John Moore (2016, 2017, 2018, 2019)

== Winners ==
Year	Winner	Age	Jockey	Trainer	Time
2014	Gold-Fun	5	Douglas Whyte	Richard Gibson	1:21.44
2015	Contentment	5	João Moreira	John Size	1:21.17
2016	Joyful Trinity	4	João Moreira	John Moore	1:21.11
2017	Beauty Generation	5	Derek Leung	John Moore	1:21.80
2018	Beauty Generation	6	Zac Purton	John Moore	1:20.62
2019	Beauty Generation	7	Zac Purton	John Moore	1:20.05
2020	Golden Sixty	5	C Y Ho	K W Lui	1:20.54
2021	Buddies	6	Matthew Chadwick	Tony Cruz	1:20.48
2022	California Spangle	4	Zac Purton	Tony Cruz	1:20.49
2023	Healthy Happy	7	Alexis Badel	Frankie Lor Fu-cuen	1:21.93
2024	The Golden Scenery	7	Brenton Avdulla	Tony Cruz	1:22.74
2025	My Wish	5	Luke Ferraris	Mark Newnham	1:20.79
2026	Invincible Ibis	5	Luke Ferraris	Mark Newnham	1:20.84

== See also ==
- List of Hong Kong horse races
