= Hong Kong Most Popular Horse of the Year =

Honour in Hong Kong thoroughbred horse racing

The Hong Kong Most Popular Horse of the Year is an honour given in Hong Kong thoroughbred horse racing. It is awarded annually by the Hong Kong Jockey Club (HKJC). The honour is part of the Hong Kong Jockey Club Champion Awards. The one who receives this award is decided by public vote.

== Winners ==
Year	Horse	Age	Bred	Trainer	Owner
1998-1999	Indigenous	6	Ireland	Ivan Allan	Mr & Mrs Pang Yuen Hing
1999-2000	Fairy King Prawn	4	Australia	Ivan Allan	Lau Sak Hong
2000–2001	Fairy King Prawn	5	Australia	Ivan Allan	Lau Sak Hong
2001–2002	Fairy King Prawn	6	Australia	Ivan Allan	Lau Sak Hong
2002–2003	Electronic Unicorn	7	United States	John Size	Lo Ying Bin
2003–2004	Silent Witness	4	Australia	Anthony S. Cruz	Arthur Antonio da Silva
2004–2005	Silent Witness	5	Australia	Anthony S. Cruz	Arthur Antonio da Silva
2005–2006	Bullish Luck	7	United States	Anthony S. Cruz	Wong Wing-Keung
2006–2007	Vengeance of Rain	6	New Zealand	David Ferraris	Chow Chu May Ping
2007–2008	Good Ba Ba	6	United States	Michael Chang Chun Wai	John Yuen Se Kit
2008–2009	Sacred Kingdom	5	Australia	Ricky P. F. Yiu	Sin Kang Yuk
2009–2010	Sacred Kingdom	6	Australia	Ricky P. F. Yiu	Sin Kang Yuk
2010–2011	Ambitious Dragon	4	New Zealand	A T Millard	Johnson Lam Pui Hung
2011–2012	Little Bridge	6	New Zealand	C S Shum	Ko Kam Piu
2012–2013	Military Attack	5	Ireland	John Moore	Steven Lo Kit Sing
2013–2014	Designs On Rome	4	Ireland	John Moore	Cheng Keung Fai
2014–2015	Able Friend	5	Australia	John Moore	Dr & Mrs Cornel Li
2015–2016	Werther	4	New Zealand	John Moore	Johnson Chen
2016–2017	Rapper Dragon	4	Australia	John Moore	Albert Hung
2017–2018	Pakistan Star	4	Germany	Anthony S. Cruz	Kerm Din
2018–2019	Beauty Generation	6	New Zealand	John Moore	Patrick Kwok Ho Chuen
2019–2020	Golden Sixty	4	Australia	Francis Lui Kin Wai	Stanley Chan Ka Leung
2020–2021	Golden Sixty	5	Australia	Francis Lui Kin Wai	Stanley Chan Ka Leung
2021–2022	Golden Sixty	6	Australia	Francis Lui Kin Wai	Stanley Chan Ka Leung
2022–2023	Golden Sixty	7	Australia	Francis Lui Kin Wai	Stanley Chan Ka Leung
2023-2024	Romantic Warrior	6	Ireland	Danny Shum	Peter Lau Pak Fai
2024-2025	Romantic Warrior	7	Ireland	Danny Shum	Peter Lau Pak Fai
