= Chairman's Trophy =

The Chairman's Trophy is a Group 2 set weights Thoroughbred horse race in Hong Kong, run at Sha Tin over a distance of 1600 metres, and takes place in early April. Horses three years old and older are qualified to enter this race.

== Winners ==
Year	Winner	Age	Jockey	Trainer	Time
2001	Lucky Six	4	Gérald Mossé	Peter Ho Leung	1:36.60
2002	Red Pepper	5	Gérald Mossé	Brian Kan Ping-chee	1:36.70
2003	Electronic Unicorn	7	Robbie Fradd	John Size	1:35.30
2004	Elegant Fashion	5	Gérald Mossé	David Hayes	1:35.20
2005	Bullish Luck	6	Brett Prebble	Tony Cruz	1:33.90
2006	Art Trader	5	Eric Saint-Martin	John Moore	1:36.10
2007	Good Ba Ba	5	Olivier Doleuze	Andreas Schütz	1:34.20
2008	Armada	6	Douglas Whyte	John Size	1:33.70
2009	More Bountiful	4	Douglas Whyte	John Size	1:33.66
2010	Able One	7	Darren Beadman	John Moore	1:34.57
2011	Flying Blue	4	Douglas Whyte	John Size	1:34.50
2012	Admiration	4	Brett Prebble	John Moore	1:34.43
2013	Packing Whiz	5	Brett Prebble	Caspar Fownes	1:34.50
2014	Able Friend	4	Karis Teetan	John Moore	1:37.19
2015	Able Friend	5	João Moreira	John Moore	1:33.76
2016	Beauty Only	5	Neil Callan	Tony Cruz	1:33.22
2017	Rapper Dragon	4	João Moreira	John Moore	1:33.74
2018	Beauty Only	7	Neil Callan	Tony Cruz	1:32.84
2019	Beauty Generation	6	Zac Purton	John Moore	1:33.26
2020	Beauty Generation	7	Zac Purton	John Moore	1:33.49
2021	Mighty Giant	5	Neil Callan	Ricky Yiu Poon-fai	1:35.06
2022	Golden Sixty	6	Vincent Ho Chak-yiu	Francis Lui Kin-wai	1:32.96
2023	California Spangle	5	Zac Purton	Tony Cruz	1:34.17
2024	Beauty Joy	7	Brenton Avdulla	Tony Cruz	1:34.03
2025	Straight Arron	6	Matthew Poon Ming-fai	Ricky Yiu Poon-fai	1:34.09
2026	Lucky Sweynesse	7	Derek Leung Ka-chun	Manfred Man Ka-leung	1:33.65

== See also ==
- List of Hong Kong horse races
