= Jockey Club Mile =

The Jockey Club Mile is a Group 2 set weights Thoroughbred horse race in Hong Kong, run at Sha Tin over 1600 metres in November.

In the 2003/2004 racing season, this race was upgraded to a domestic Group 2 event. The race was promoted to International Group 2 status in 2010. The prize money in season 2013/14 is HK$3,500,000, which was increased to HK$3,875,000 in season 2014/15.

== Winners ==
Year	Winner	Age	Jockey	Trainer	Owner	Time
2010	Able One	8	Darren Beadman	John Moore	Dr & Mrs Cornel Li Fook Kwan	1:34.37
2011	Destined For Glory	4	Timothy Clark	John Moore	Connie Siu Kim Ying	1:34.86
2012	Glorious Days	5	Douglas Whyte	John Size	Tom Brown's Syndicate	1:34.14
2013	Gold-Fun	5	Olivier Doleuze	Richard Gibson	Pan Sutong	1:33.89
2014	Able Friend	5	João Moreira	John Moore	Cornel Li Fook Kwan	1:33.46
2015	Beauty Flame	5	Gerald Mosse	Tony Cruz	Kwok Siu Ming	1:33.74
2016	Beauty Only	5	Zac Purton	Tony Cruz	Eleanor Kwok Law Kwai Chun & Patrick Kwok Ho Chuen	1:33.79
2017	Seasons Bloom	5	João Moreira	Danny Shum Chap-shing	Paul Lo Chung Wai & Kathy Lo Ho Hsiu Lan	1:34.13
2018	Beauty Generation	6	Zac Purton	John Moore	Patrick Kwok Ho Chuen	1:32.64
2019	Waikuku	4	João Moreira	John Size	Jocelyn Siu Yang Hin Ting	1:32.89
2020	Golden Sixty	5	Vincent Ho Chak-yiu	Francis Lui Kin-wai	Stanley Chan Ka Leung	1:32.91
2021	Golden Sixty	6	Vincent Ho Chak-yiu	Francis Lui Kin-wai	Stanley Chan Ka Leung	1:34.55
2022	Golden Sixty	7	Vincent Ho Chak-yiu	Francis Lui Kin-wai	Stanley Chan Ka Leung	1:34.02
2023	Beauty Eternal	5	Zac Purton	John Size	Patrick Kwok Ho Chuen	1:33.04
2024	Voyage Bubble	6	James McDonald	Ricky Yiu Poon-fai	Sunshine & Moonlight Syndicate	1:32.82
2025	Galaxy Patch	6	James McDonald	Pierre Ng Pang-chi	Yeung Kin Man	1:32.88
2026	My Wish	6	Zac Purton	Mark Newnham	Ada Che Xiao Hong, Suki Tang Xianfang & Ruby Hui Like Sea	1:34.28

== See also ==
- List of Hong Kong horse races
