= Lion Rock Trophy =

Annual horse race in Hong Kong

- Class: Group 3
- Location: Sha Tin Racecourse
- Inaugurated: 2016
- Race type: Thoroughbred – Flat racing

Race information
- Distance: 1,600 metres
- Surface: Turf
- Track: Right-handed
- Qualification: 3-y-o+
- Purse: HK$3,250,000

The Lion Rock Trophy, is a horse race for horses aged three and over, run at a distance of 1,600 metres (one mile) on turf in late May or early June at Sha Tin Racecourse in Hong Kong.

The Lion Rock Trophy was first contested in 2016 and was upgraded to International Group 3 class a year later. It is named after Lion Rock, a mountain in Hong Kong.

== Records ==
Record time:

- 1:33.13 – The Golden Age 2018

Most successful horse:

- no horse has won the race more than once

Most wins by a jockey:

- 4 – João Moreira 2016, 2018, 2019, 2021

Most wins by a trainer:

- 2 – Tony Cruz 2018, 2020
- 2 – John Moore 2015, 2016
- 2 – John Size 2019, 2023

== Winners ==
Year	Winner	Age	Jockey	Trainer	Time
2016	Rapper Dragon	3	João Moreira	John Moore	1:33.87
2017	Booming Delight	4	Sam Clipperton	John Moore	1:33.91
2018	The Golden Age	4	João Moreira	Tony Cruz	1:33.13
2019	Champion's Way	3	João Moreira	John Size	1:35.00
2020	Ka Ying Star	5	Chad Schofield	Tony Cruz	1:32.95
2021	Sky Darci	4	João Moreira	Caspar Fownes	1:33.45
2022	Beauty Joy	5	Zac Purton	Tony Cruz	1:34.71
2023	Beauty Eternal	4	Zac Purton	John Size	1:33.34
2024	Galaxy Patch	4	Vincent Ho Chak-yiu	Pierre Ng Pang-chi	1:33.93
2025	Pray For Mir	4	Matthew Chadwick	Cody Mo Wai-kit	1:33.83
2026	Light Years Charm	5	Jerry Chau Chun-lok	David Eustace	1:33.58

== See also ==
- List of Hong Kong horse races
