= Beauty Generation =

New Zealand-bred Thoroughbred racehorse

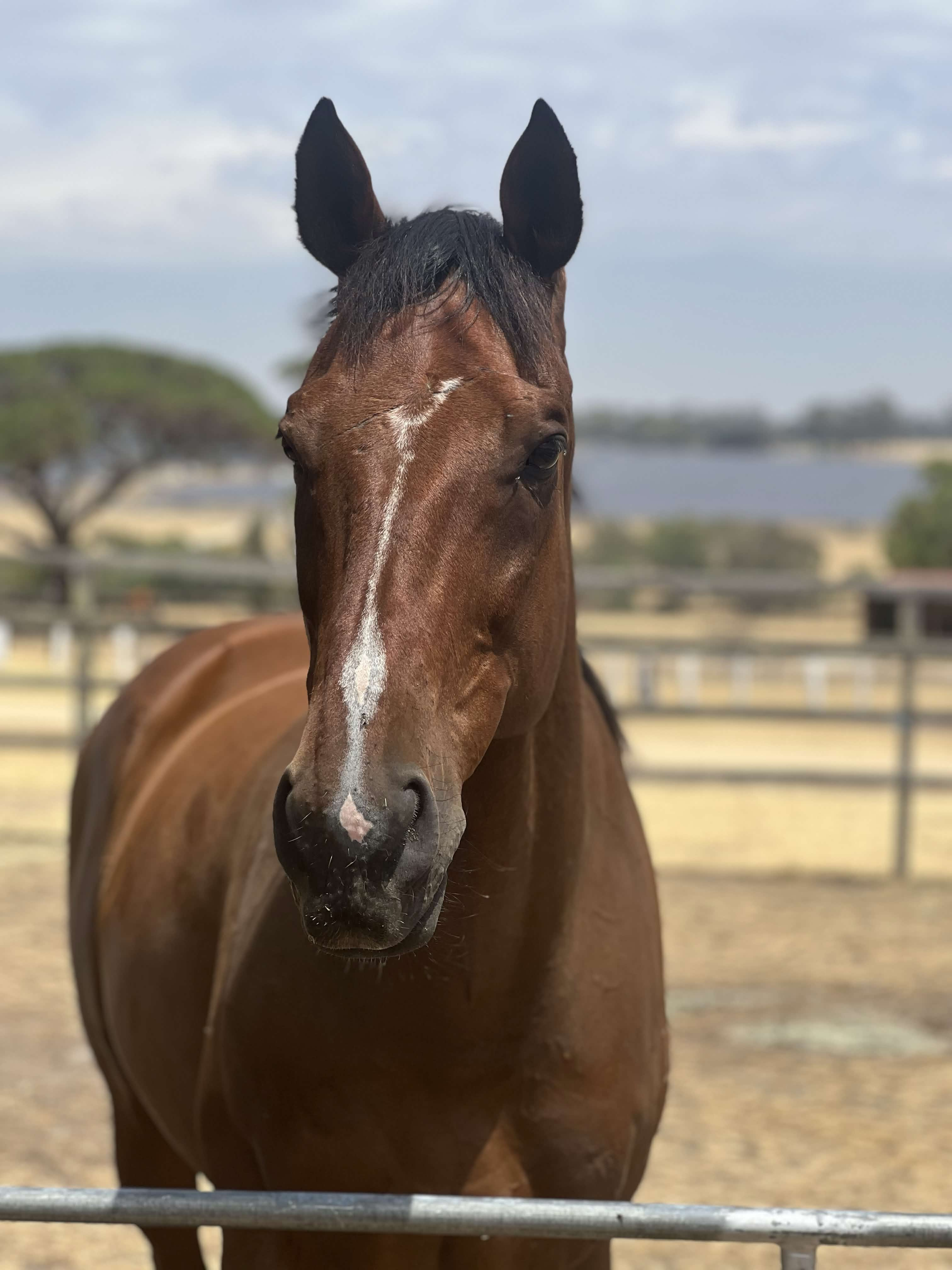
- Sire: Road To Rock
- Grandsire: Encosta de Lago
- Dam: Stylish Bel
- Damsire: Bel Esprit
- Sex: Gelding
- Foaled: 27 September 2012
- Country: New Zealand
- Colour: Bay
- Breeder: Nearco Stud Limited
- Owner: Anthony Cummings et al Patrick Kwok Ho Chuen
- Trainer: Anthony Cummings; John Moore
- Record: 38: 18-5-7
- Earnings: HK$106,233,750

Major wins
- Celebration Cup (2017, 2018, 2019); Sha Tin Trophy (2017, 2018); Hong Kong Mile (2017, 2018); Queen's Silver Jubilee Cup (2018, 2019, 2020); Champions Mile (2018, 2019); Jockey Club Mile (2018); Hong Kong Stewards' Cup (2019); Chairman's Trophy (2019, 2020)

Awards
- Hong Kong Champion Miler (2018); Hong Kong Horse of the Year (2018, 2019)

Beauty Generation (Chinese: 美麗傳承; foaled 27 September 2012) is a New Zealand-bred Thoroughbred racehorse best known for his performances in Hong Kong. He began his career as a three-year-old in Australia where he won two races and ran second in the Rosehill Guineas before being exported to Hong Kong.

As a four-year-old he won twice and was placed third in both the Hong Kong Classic Mile and the Hong Kong Derby. In the following year he emerged as the best racehorse in Hong Kong, winning five races including the Celebration Cup, Sha Tin Trophy, Hong Kong Mile, Queen's Silver Jubilee Cup and Champions Mile and being named Hong Kong Horse of the Year. He resumed his form in the following season, taking the Celebration Cup, Sha Tin Trophy, Jockey Club Mile, Hong Kong Mile, Hong Kong Stewards' Cup and Queen's Silver Jubilee Cup.

He was rated the fourth-best racehorse in the world for 2018 and the equal-best horse ever trained in Hong Kong.

== Background ==
Beauty Generation is a bay gelding with a narrow white blaze and four white socks bred at Highden Stud in Palmerston North, New Zealand by Nearco Stud Limited. In 2014 he was put up for auction at the New Zealand Bloodstock National Yearling Sale and was bought for NZ$60,000 by Anthony Cummings and syndicated with the help of Hermes Syndications. He was sent to race in Australia where he was named Montaigne and entered training with Anthony Cummings who also headed the syndicate which owned the horse.

He was sired by Road To Rock, a top-class Australian performer whose wins included the George Main Stakes in 2009 and the Queen Elizabeth Stakes in 2010. Beauty Generation's dam was a descendant of Eulogy (foaled 1911), a British mare who was exported to New Zealand and was the ancestor of numerous major winners including Dundeel, Red Handed, Bonecrusher and Ambitious Dragon.

== Racing career ==
=== 2015/2016: three-year-old season ===
Montaigne began his track career in Australia by finishing second in a maiden race over 1100 metres at Warwick Farm Racecourse on 7 January 2015 and recorded his first success in a similar event over 1400 metres at the same track thirteen day later. On 6 February Randwick Racecourse he took on older horses in a handicap race over 1600 metres and won again, coming home more than two lengths in front of Kellyville Flyer. In his four remaining Australian starts Montaigne was campaigned in Group races and showed good form despite failing to win. He finished third in the Hobartville Stakes, fifth in the Randwick Guineas, second in the Rosehill Guineas and fourth in The BMW.

At the end of the season Montaigne was sold privately to Patrick Kwok Ho Chuen and exported to Hong Kong where he was renamed Beauty Generation and sent into training with John Moore. In all of his subsequent races he wore blinkers.

=== 2016/2017: four-year-old season ===
Beauty Generation was ridden in all of his races as a four-year-old by Zac Purton and was campaigned exclusively at Sha Tin Racecourse. He wore blinkers in all of his Hong Kong races. On 27 December the gelding ran second on his Hong Kong debut and then recorded his first success for his new connections when he won the Violet Handicap over 1600 metres on 17 January, beating California Disegno by a head. He was then moved up in class and was beaten by Rapper Dragon on his next three starts, finishing third the Hong Kong Classic Mile, eleventh in the Hong Kong Classic Cup and third in the Hong Kong Derby. In April he was dropped back in class for the Jinbao Street Handicap over 2200 metres and won again, beating Eagle Way by a short head. On his final run of the season he was stepped up in trip for the 2400 metre Queen Mother Memorial Cup and finished unplaced behind Eagle Way.

=== 2017/2018: five-year-old season ===
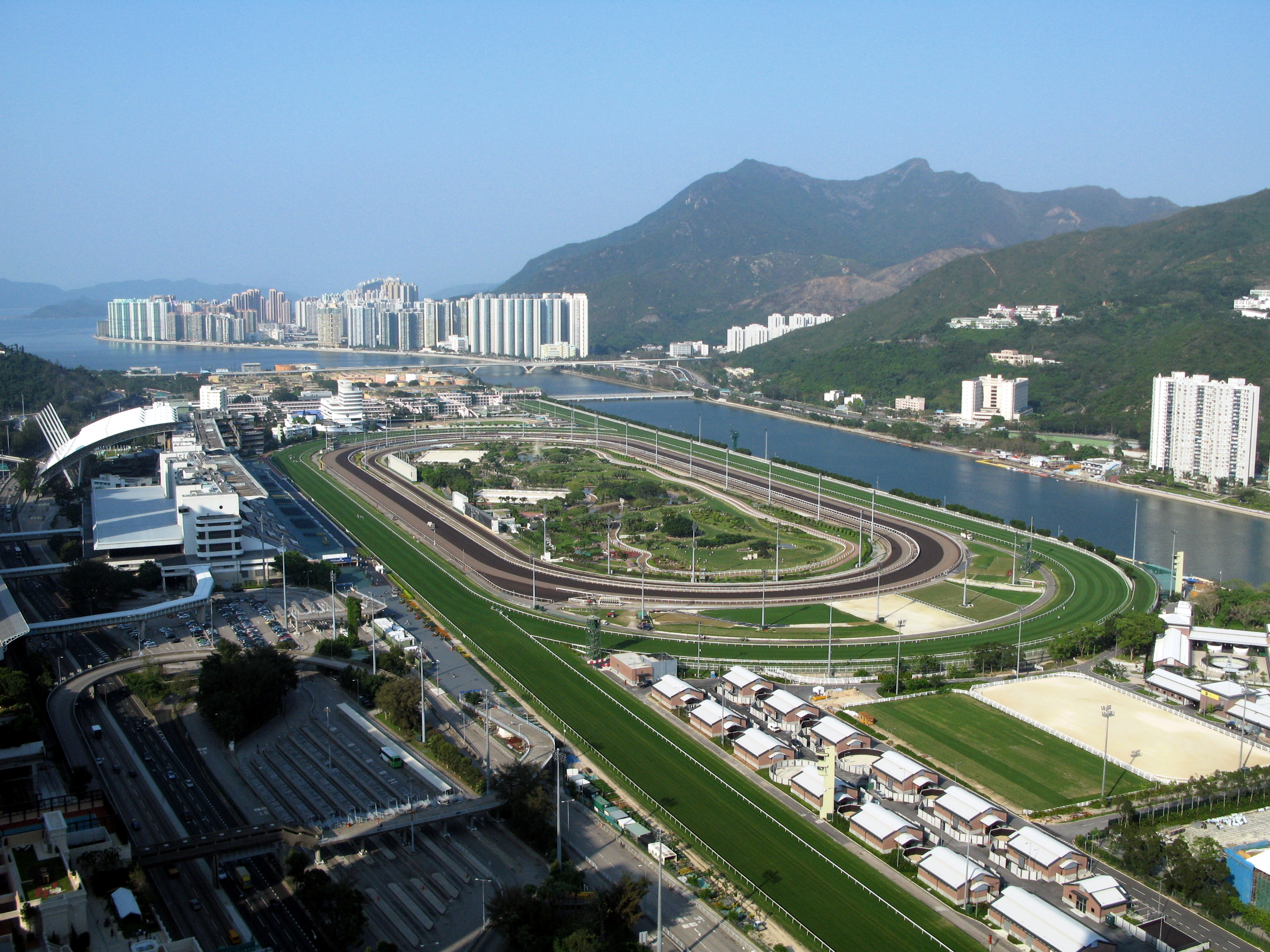
Sha Tin Racecourse, the location for most of Beauty Generation's races

K C Leung rode Beauty Generation in most of his races in the 2017/2018 season. Starting at odds of 17.9/1 on his seasonal debut in the Group 3 Celebration Cup over 1400 metres on 1 October, the gelding led from the start and won "unchallenged" by one and a half lengths from the favourite Seasons Bloom with Time Warp (Hong Kong Cup), Beauty Only (2016 Hong Kong Mile) and Eagle Way finishing behind. Three weeks later he followed up in the Group 2 Sha Tin Trophy, beating Booming Delight by a head after taking the lead 400 metres from the finish in a race which saw Werther (Hong Kong Cup), Beauty Only and Helene Paragon (Queen's Silver Jubilee Cup) run unplaced. In the Jockey Club Mile on 19 November he started favourite, but in a closely contested finish he was beaten into third place behind Seasons Bloom and Helene Paragon. In the Group 1 Hong Kong Mile on 10 December Beauty Generation started the 7.4/1 fourth choice in the betting behind Seasons Bloom, Beauty Only and Helene Paragon in a fourteen-runner field which also included Roly Poly and Lancaster Bomber from Ireland, Satono Aladdin (Yasuda Kinen) from Japan and Lightning Spear from England. He took the lead from the start, broke clear of his rivals early in the straight, and stayed on well to win by a length from the 35/1 outsider Western Express. After the race, John Moore said "As we anticipated, he got the gun run today. He was able to dictate on his own terms, and over a mile he definitely has a turn of foot. He really attacked the line today. I thought if he wasn't taken on, he'd be very tough."

In the 2017 World's Best Racehorse Rankings, Beauty Generation was rated the ninetieth-best horse in the world with a rating of 118.

On 28 January Beauty Generation finished only seventh to Seasons Bloom in the Stewards' Cup after which Leung lost the ride on the gelding. Purton resumed the ride when Beauty Generation started the third choice in the betting behind Beat The Clock and Fifty Fifty in the Queen's Silver Jubilee Cup over 1400 metres on 25 February. He was among the leaders from the start, took the lead 400 metres out and "held on gamely" to win by a head from Beat The Clock. On 8 April he finished fifth to Beauty Only in the Chairman's Trophy, conceding five pounds in weight to four horses who finished ahead of him. Three weeks later the horse ended his season in the Champions Mile and, with Purton in the saddle, started favourite ahead of seven opponents including Season Bloom, Pingwu Spark, Singapore Sling (Hong Kong Classic Cup) and Beauty Only. Beauty Generation took the lead soon after the start and set a steady pace before accelerating in the straight and winning by a length from Western Express.

In July 2018 Beauty Generation was named Hong Kong Champion Miler and Hong Kong Horse of the Year at the Hong Kong Jockey Club Champion Awards. Moore, who was winning the award for the sixth time, commented "When he wins, it's not always exciting, he just gets out in front or on the speed and wins the big ones. I brought him back from what we thought was a 2000 metre horse and made him a miler and here we are enjoying the fruits of all his successes on the stage of Horse of the Year – it's amazing".

=== 2018/2019: six-year-old season ===
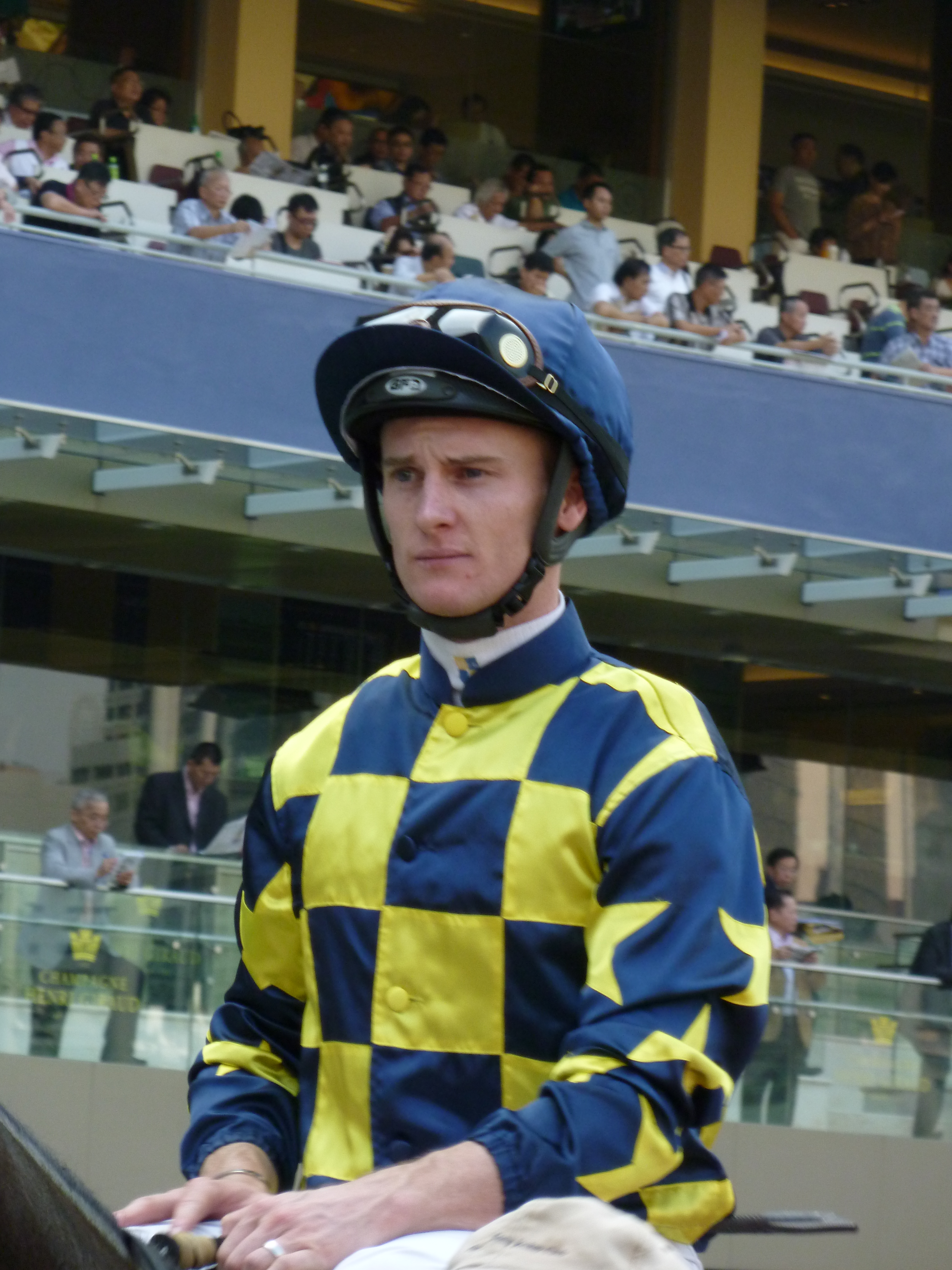
Zac Purton, Beauty Generation's regular jockey

Zac Purton was Beauty Generation's regular jockey in the 2018–2019 season. The gelding began his campaign, as in the previous season, in the Celebration Cup for which he was assigned top weight of 133 pounds. After racing in second place he took the lead 400 metres out and accelerated away from the field to win in "impressive" style by two and three quarter lengths from Ping Hai Star. On 20 October he repeated his 2017 success in the Sha Tin Trophy, winning by half a length from Singapore Sling, to whom he was conceding sixteen pounds, after leading from the start. In the Jockey Club Mile on 18 November Beauty Generation started odds-on favourite, with the best fancied of his seven opponents being Singapore Sling and Beauty Only. After tracking the early leaders he moved up on the outside and took the lead entering the straight. Despite hanging to the left in the closing stages he came home three lengths clear of Southern Legend, with Beauty Only a head away in third place.

On 9 December Beauty Generation attempted to repeat his 2017 success in the Hong Kong Mile and started odds-on favorite in a fourteen-runner field. Beauty Only, Singapore Sling and Southern Legend were again in opposition while the international contingent included Vivlos (Dubai Turf), Persian Knight (Mile Championship) and Mozu Ascot (Yasuda Kinen) from Japan, One Master (Prix de la Forêt) and Beat The Bank (Summer Mile Stakes) from England, Comin' Through (Doomben Cup) from Australia and Inns of Court (Prix du Palais-Royal) from France. Beauty Generation went to the front before half way, broke clear of the field early in the straight and came home three lengths clear of Vivlos. Purton commented "That's what we all hoped we would see today. I’m just happy for the horse that he's come out and produced it on a big stage. He showed everyone how brutally good he can be. He's got a really high cruising speed – he's very comfortable rolling along at that speed and then he can kick off it."

In the 2018 World's Best Racehorse Rankings, Beauty Generation given a rating of 127, making him the fourth best racehorse in the world behind Cracksman, Winx and Accelerate. His rating matched that of Able Friend in 2014 making him the equal highest rated horse ever trained in Hong Kong.

On his next appearance Beauty Generation made a second attempt to win the Stewards' Cup and was made the 1/10 favourite, with the best-fancied of his five opponents being Conte and Pakistan Star (Queen Elizabeth II Cup). He led from the start opened up a clear advantage in the straight, and won "comfortably" by three lengths from Conte. After the race Moore described the winner as the best horse he had ever trained, ahead of Viva Pataca and Able Friend. The Queen's Silver Jubilee Cup on 17 February saw Beauty Generation head the betting at odds of 1/4 ahead of Beat The Clock, who had won the Centenary Sprint Cup in January. Having gained the advantage from Beat The Clock after 400 metres he led the field into the straight and was never seriously challenged, winning by one and three quarter lengths. Moore commented "When I saddled him up he just wanted to knock me down and get out of the boxes. This horse is in such good form at the moment. Today we had no hiccups leading into the race whatsoever, everything has gone exactly to plan." On 7 April Beauty Generation made his second attempt to win the Chairman's Trophy and went off at odds of 1/5 against eight opponents. He led from the start, accelerated clear in the final furlong and won by one and a quarter lengths from Eagle Way with two-time group 1 winner Pakistan Star half a length back in third. On 28 April the gelding attempted to repeat his 2018 success in the Champions Mile and went off at odds of 1/20 against six opponents headed by Conte and Singapore Sling. He went to the front and set a steady pace before accelerating in the straight and won in a "canter" by a length and a half from Singapore Sling. His victory made him the first horse to win eight races in a Hong Kong season and took his lifetime earnings to HK$84,770,000, beating the record set by Viva Pataca.

== Pedigree ==
Pedigree of Beauty Generation (NZ), bay gelding, 2012
Sire Road To Rock (AUS) 2004	Encosta de Lago; 1993	Fairy King (USA)	Northern Dancer (CAN)
Sire Road To Rock (AUS) 2004	Encosta de Lago; 1993	Fairy King (USA)	Fairy Bridge
Sire Road To Rock (AUS) 2004	Encosta de Lago; 1993	Shoal Creek	Star Way (GB)
Sire Road To Rock (AUS) 2004	Encosta de Lago; 1993	Shoal Creek	Rolls (USA)
Sire Road To Rock (AUS) 2004	Trewornan (GB); 1997	Midyan (USA)	Miswaki
Sire Road To Rock (AUS) 2004	Trewornan (GB); 1997	Midyan (USA)	Country Dream
Sire Road To Rock (AUS) 2004	Trewornan (GB); 1997	Miss Silca Key (IRE)	Welsh Saint
Sire Road To Rock (AUS) 2004	Trewornan (GB); 1997	Miss Silca Key (IRE)	Tremiti
Dam Stylish Bel (AUS) 2005	Bel Esprit; 1999	Royal Academy (USA)	Nijinsky (CAN)
Dam Stylish Bel (AUS) 2005	Bel Esprit; 1999	Royal Academy (USA)	Crimson Saint
Dam Stylish Bel (AUS) 2005	Bel Esprit; 1999	Bespoken	Vain
Dam Stylish Bel (AUS) 2005	Bel Esprit; 1999	Bespoken	Vin d'Amour (NZ)
Dam Stylish Bel (AUS) 2005	Stylish Victory; 1986	Durham Ranger (USA)	Noholme (AUS)
Dam Stylish Bel (AUS) 2005	Stylish Victory; 1986	Durham Ranger (USA)	Halconera (ARG)
Dam Stylish Bel (AUS) 2005	Stylish Victory; 1986	Romantic Peace	Mikado
Dam Stylish Bel (AUS) 2005	Stylish Victory; 1986	Romantic Peace	Vorticist (family: 22-b)
