= King Al Akbar =

New Zealand-bred racehorse

- Sire: Al Akbar
- Grandsire: Success Express
- Dam: Grande
- Damsire: Senor Pete
- Sex: Gelding
- Country: New Zealand
- Colour: Bay
- Owner: Mr & Mrs Patrick Fung Pak Tung and Ophelia Fung Wing Sei
- Trainer: Richard Gibson
- Record: 30: 5-2-2 (As of 27 February 2012)
- Earnings: HK$ 3,112,250 (As of 27 February 2012)
- Last updated on August 13, 2009

King Al Akbar (Chinese: 皇帝旨令 ) is a New Zealand-bred Hong Kong based racehorse. He won five races in the season of 2010-2011. He was one of the nominees for 2010-2011 Hong Kong Horse of the Year.
