= More Bountiful =

New Zealand-bred Thoroughbred racehorse

More Bountiful (Chinese: 再豐裕) is a Hong Kong–based Thoroughbred racehorse.

In the season of 2008–2009, More Bountiful has topped that performance by reeling off six wins to go from Class 4 to domestic Group Two Chairman's Trophy (1600) champion in his maiden season. This horse has also a lock on the Most-Improved Horse title for his meteoric ratings rise of 72 points from 52 to 124 from 11 outings. More Bountiful also is one of the nominees of Hong Kong Horse of the Year.

== Profile ==
- Sire: Van Nistelrooy
- Dam: Centaine Gu Li
- Sex: Gelding
- Country: New Zealand
- Colour: Brown
- Owner: Lucky Lord Syndicate
- Trainer: John Size
- Record: (No. of 1-2-3-Starts) 6-1-0-11 (As of 27 February 2012)
- Earnings: HK$6,335,000 (As of 27 February 2012)
