= Sha Tin Sprint Trophy =

The Sha Tin Sprint Trophy was a Group 3 Thoroughbred handicap horse race in Hong Kong, run at Sha Tin over 1000 metres in October. It was replaced by the National Day Cup as of 2014, when the distance of that race was reduced from 1400 metres to 1000 metres.

Horses rated 95 and above are qualified to enter this race.

== Winners ==
Year	Winner	Age	Jockey	Trainer
2003	Silent Witness	4	F Coetzee	Tony Cruz
2004	Scintillation	4	Douglas Whyte	C S Shum
2005	Able Prince	5	Michael Rodd	John Moore
2006	Sunny Sing	4	E Saint-Martin	John Moore
2007	Sacred Kingdom	4	Gérald Mossé	P F Yiu
2008	Enthused	5	Douglas Whyte	John Size
2009	Happy Zero	5	W C Marwing	John Moore
2010	Sacred Kingdom	7	Brett Prebble	P F Yiu
2011	Entrapment	5	Douglas Whyte	John Size
2012	Vital Flyer	7	Y T Cheng	C W Chang
2013	Go Baby Go	6	Tye Angland	C H Yip
