= Designs On Rome =

Irish-bred Thoroughbred racehorse

- Racing silks of Mrs Patrick J Flynn and Cheng Keung Fai
- Sire: Holy Roman Emperor
- Grandsire: Danehill
- Dam: Summer Trysting
- Damsire: Alleged
- Sex: Gelding
- Foaled: 17 March 2010
- Died: 12 January 2025 (aged 14)
- Country: Ireland
- Colour: Bay
- Breeder: Moyglare Stud
- Owner: Mrs Patrick J. Flynn; Cheng Keung Fai
- Trainer: Patrick J. Flynn; John Moore
- Record: 25: 10-3-2
- Earnings: £5,459,373 (HKD$59,009,325)

Major wins
- Sha Tin Mile Trophy (2013); Hong Kong Classic Cup (2014); Hong Kong Derby (2014); Queen Elizabeth II Cup (2014); Hong Kong Cup (2014); Centenary Vase (2015); Hong Kong Gold Cup (2015, 2016)

Awards
- Hong Kong Horse of the Year (2013/14); Hong Kong Most Popular Horse of the Year (2013/14); Hong Kong Champion Middle-distance Horse (2013/14)

Designs On Rome (17 March 2010-12 January 2025) was an Irish-bred Thoroughbred racehorse. He was best known for his performances in Hong Kong where he was named Horse of the Year in 2014.

== Background ==
Designs On Rome was a bay gelding bred in Ireland by the Moyglare Stud. He was sired by Holy Roman Emperor, one of the leading European two-year-olds of his generation, who unusually began his stud career as a three-year-old. The best of his other progeny have included the 1000 Guineas winner Homecoming Queen and the Santa Anita Sprint Championship winner Rich Tapestry. Designs On Rome's dam Summer Trysting failed to win but finished second on five occasions and was closely related to the Irish Derby winner Grey Swallow.

== Racing career ==
=== 2012: two-year-old season ===
Designs On Rome ran five times as a juvenile in 2012. In May, it finished third in a maiden race at Gowran Park and fourth in a similar event at the Curragh. He recorded his first success in a seven furlong maiden at Naas in August, beating the Dermot Weld-trained favourite Mouteab by two lengths at odds of 9/2. Later that month, in a nursery race (a handicap for two-year-olds) he finished second to Sugar Boy, to whom he was conceding seven pounds. On his final appearance as a juvenile, Designs On Rome was moved up to Group One class for the National Stakes at the Curragh. Starting a 28/1 outsider, he finished second of the seven runners behind Dawn Approach.

=== 2013/2014 season ===
In 2013, Designs On Rome was bought by Cheng Keung Fai and sent to Hong Kong where he was trained by John Moore. On his first appearance for his new connections he won the Sha Tin Trophy, a one-mile handicap race at Sha Tin Racecourse. In January 2014 he finished second to the favoured Able Friend Hong Kong Classic Mile, before defeating the same horse to record his first major success in the Hong Kong Classic Cup a month later. Designs On Rome met Able Friend for the third time in the Hong Kong Derby over ten furlongs in March and won again, prevailing over his rival by half a length. In April Designs On Rome won the Queen Elizabeth II Cup, beating Military Attack by a neck, with the South African runner Vercingetorix in third and Epiphaneia in fourth. When moved up in distance for the Hong Kong Champions & Chater Cup over 2400 metres in May he started the 2/5 favourite, but finished fifth of the eight runners behind Blazing Speed. He was ridden by Tommy Berry in this season's major races.

=== 2014/2015 season ===
In this season, Designs On Rome is ridden by Joao Moreira. He failed to win in his first three starts in the autumn of 2014. He finished third when attempting to concede three pounds to Gold-Fun in the Celebration Cup over 1400 metres on 5 October, eighth behind Military Attack in the 1600 metre Oriental Watch Sha Tin Trophy three weeks later and fifth to Blazing Speed in the Jockey Club Cup in November. After that, He won the Hong Kong Cup (G1 2000m) on 14 December by beating Military Attack with a short-head. In 2015, he continued his winning way by winning both the Centenary Vase (HKG3 1800m) and the Hong Kong Gold Cup (G1 2000m). In March he was sent to the United Arab Emirates to contest the Sheema Classic. He came from well off the pace to finish fourth behind Dolniya, Flintshire and One And Only. On his return to Hong Kong he finished fourth to Blazing Speed in the Queen Elizabeth II Cup. He then missed the Hong Kong Champions & Chater Cup due to injury, and have to undergo an arthroscopic joint surgery.

=== 2015/2016 season ===
Designs On Rome came back from the surgery with his seasonal debut in the Jockey Club Mile as a prep race for the Hong Kong Cup, in which he finishes sixth. He then steps up to his best trip of 2000M in the Hong Kong Cup, which he won the year before. But this time he could only manage to fourth behind the Japanese A Shin Hikari and Nuovo Record. In his next start in the one mile Stewards' Cup, he disappointed, finishing eighth. He races again a month later at his optimum trip of 2000M in the Hong Kong Gold Cup, but this time ridden by his old partner Tommy Berry, according to the owner's will. He stayed in the tail of the field, but being pushed 800M from home, setting off his trademark early run. He sustained his momentum and held off stable companion Helene Happy Star by a comfortable half-length margin, claiming back-to-back victories in the Hong Kong Gold Cup. Designs On Rome proved his class and demolished all the suspicions that he would not return to his best again after the injury. He then finished third in the Group 2 Chairman's Trophy as a lead-up for the Queen Elizabeth II Cup.

== After retirement ==
After retiring from racing, Designs on Rome was moved to Living Legends in Australia to live out his retirement. He was euthanised on 12 January 2025 due to severe colic.

== Assessment and awards ==
In the Hong Kong Jockey Club Champion Awards for the 2013/2014 season, Designs On Rome was named Horse of the Year, Most Popular Horse of the Year and Champion Middle-distance Horse.

== Pedigree ==
Pedigree of Designs On Rome (IRE), bay gelding 2010
Sire Holy Roman Emperor (IRE) 2004	Danehill (USA); 1986	Danzig	Northern Dancer
Sire Holy Roman Emperor (IRE) 2004	Danehill (USA); 1986	Danzig	Pas de Nom
Sire Holy Roman Emperor (IRE) 2004	Danehill (USA); 1986	Razyana	His Majesty
Sire Holy Roman Emperor (IRE) 2004	Danehill (USA); 1986	Razyana	Spring Adieu
Sire Holy Roman Emperor (IRE) 2004	L'On Vite (USA); 1986	Secretariat	Bold Ruler
Sire Holy Roman Emperor (IRE) 2004	L'On Vite (USA); 1986	Secretariat	Somethingroyal
Sire Holy Roman Emperor (IRE) 2004	L'On Vite (USA); 1986	Fanfreluche	Northern Dancer
Sire Holy Roman Emperor (IRE) 2004	L'On Vite (USA); 1986	Fanfreluche	Ciboulette
Dam Summer Trysting (USA) 1992	Alleged (USA); 1974	Hoist The Flag	Tom Rolfe
Dam Summer Trysting (USA) 1992	Alleged (USA); 1974	Hoist The Flag	Wavy Navy
Dam Summer Trysting (USA) 1992	Alleged (USA); 1974	Princess Pout	Prince John
Dam Summer Trysting (USA) 1992	Alleged (USA); 1974	Princess Pout	Determined Lady
Dam Summer Trysting (USA) 1992	Seasonal Pickup (USA); 1981	The Minstrel	Northern Dancer
Dam Summer Trysting (USA) 1992	Seasonal Pickup (USA); 1981	The Minstrel	Fleur
Dam Summer Trysting (USA) 1992	Seasonal Pickup (USA); 1981	Bubinka	Nashua
Dam Summer Trysting (USA) 1992	Seasonal Pickup (USA); 1981	Bubinka	Stolen Date (Family: 8-f)

- Designs On Rome is inbred 4 x 4 x 4 to Northern Dancer, meaning that this stallion appears three times in the fourth generation of his pedigree.
