= Motivation (horse) =

Argentine-bred Thoroughbred racehorse

- Sire: Egg Toss
- Grandsire: Buckpasser
- Dam: Frau Lamanche
- Damsire: Frari
- Sex: Gelding
- Foaled: 1987
- Country: Argentina
- Colour: Chestnut
- Breeder: Haras La Biznaga
- Owner: Mr & Mrs Hui Sai Fun
- Trainer: James M. P. Eustace (UK); John Moore (Hong Kong)
- Record: 21: 6-5-1
- Earnings: HK$7,494,177

Major wins
- Radio Norfolk 'Tea For Two' Handicap (1991); Hong Kong Invitational Cup (1993)

Motivation (Chinese: 計惑) (foaled August 5, 1987 in Argentina) was a Thoroughbred racehorse best known for winning the 1993 Hong Kong Invitational Cup. Bred by Pedro Blaquier, he was sired by Egg Toss, a son of the U.S. Racing Hall of Fame inductee, Buckpasser. Out of the mare Frau Lamanche, the colt was first named "Freak Toss." Purchased by Hong Kong shipping tycoon Hui Sai Fun, he raced in the United Kingdom from August 1990 through June 1991 where in 10 starts he compiled a record of 1-2-1.

Brought to Hong Kong, he was renamed Motivation. Under trainer John Moore, he won five of eleven races, most notably capturing the prestigious Hong Kong Invitational Cup in 1993.
