= Champions Mile =

Flat horse race in Hong Kong

THE FWD Champions Mile
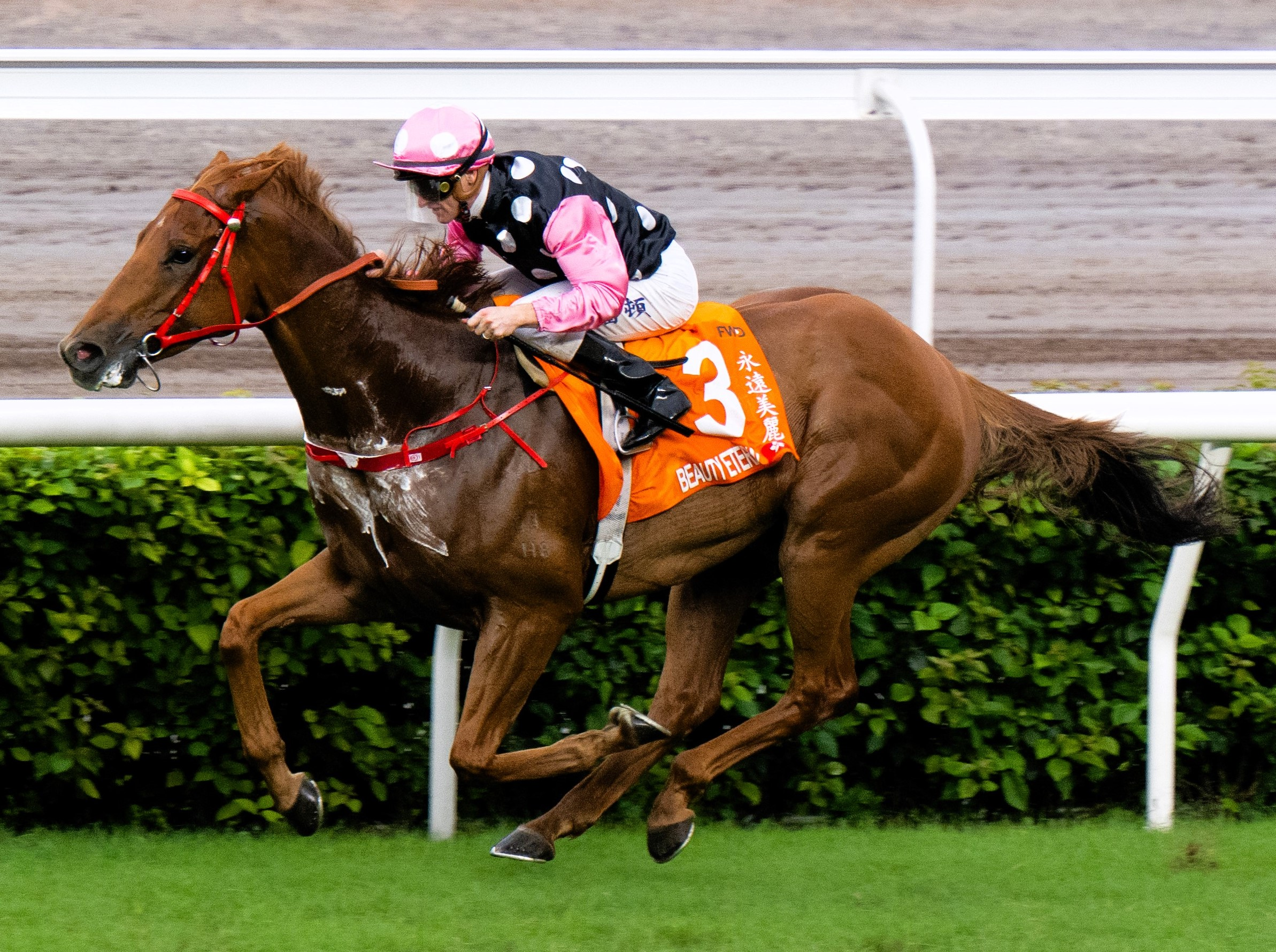
- 2024 winner Beauty Eternal
- Class: Group 1
- Location: Sha Tin Racecourse; Hong Kong
- Inaugurated: 2001
- Race type: Flat / Thoroughbred
- Sponsor: FWD Group
- Website: Champions Mile

Race information
- Distance: 1,600 meters (About 8 furlongs / (1 mile)
- Surface: Turf
- Track: Right-handed
- Qualification: Three-years-old and up
- Weight: 121 lb (3y); 126 lb (4y+); Allowances; 4 lb for fillies and mares 6 lb for N. Hemisphere 3-y-o
- Purse: HK$20,000,000 (2022)

The Champions Mile is a Group 1 flat horse race in Hong Kong for three-year-old and above thoroughbreds run over a distance of 1,600 metres (approximately 1 mile) on the turf at Sha Tin Racecourse with the total purse of HK$14m in 2014/15, approximately US$1.8m.

It was first run in 2001, opened to international competition in 2005 and granted an international grade 1 status in 2007. The race is now the third leg of the four-race Asian Mile Challenge, preceded by the Futurity Stakes and the Dubai Duty Free Stakes and followed by the Yasuda Kinen.

== Winners ==
Year	Winner	Age	Country	Jockey	Trainer	Owner	Time
2001	Red Pepper	4	Hong Kong	Éric Legrix	Brian Kan Ping-chee	Mr & Mrs Chau Kam Chuen	1:37.50
2002	Jeune King Prawn	5	Hong Kong	Weichong Marwing	Ivan Allan	Mr & Mrs Lau Sak Hong	1:35.20
2003	Electronic Unicorn	7	Hong Kong	Robbie Fradd	John Size	Lo Ying Bin	1:36.20
2004	Figures	5	Hong Kong	Torsten Mundry	David Oughton	Financial Investors Group Syndicate	1:34.20
2005	Bullish Luck	6	Hong Kong	Gerald Mosse	Tony Cruz	Wong Wing Keung	1:33.70
2006	Bullish Luck	7	Hong Kong	Brett Prebble	Tony Cruz	Wong Wing Keung	1:33.70
2007	Able One	4	Hong Kong	Michael Kinane	John Moore	Dr & Mrs Cornel Li Fook Kwan	1:34.50
2008	Good Ba Ba	6	Hong Kong	Olivier Doleuze	Andreas Schütz	John Yuen Se Kit	1:33.50
2009	Sight Winner	5	Hong Kong	Brett Prebble	John Size	Mr. and Mrs. Tam Wing Kun	1:34.97
2010	Able One	7	Hong Kong	Darren Beadman	John Moore	Dr & Mrs Cornel Li Fook Kwan	1:33.63
2011	Xtension	4	Hong Kong	Darren Beadman	John Moore	Mr & Mrs Steven Lo	1:34.71
2012	Xtension	5	Hong Kong	James McDonald	John Moore	Mr & Mrs Steven Lo	1:35.23
2013	Dan Excel	5	Hong Kong	Weichong Marwing	John Moore	David Philip Boehm	1:33.42
2014	Variety Club	6	South Africa	Anton Marcus	Mike de Kock	I & M Jooste	1:34.11
2015	Able Friend	5	Hong Kong	João Moreira	John Moore	Dr & Mrs Cornel Li Fook Kwan	1:33.76
2016	Maurice	5	Japan	João Moreira	Noriyuki Hori	Kazumi Yoshida	1:34.08
2017	Contentment	6	Hong Kong	Brett Prebble	John Size	Benson Lo Tak Wing	1:35.23
2018	Beauty Generation	5	Hong Kong	Zac Purton	John Moore	Patrick Kwok Ho Chuen	1:34.31
2019	Beauty Generation	6	Hong Kong	Zac Purton	John Moore	Patrick Kwok Ho Chuen	1:33.63
2020	Southern Legend	7	Hong Kong	Vincent Ho Chak-yiu	Caspar Fownes	Boniface Ho Ka Kui	1:33.13
2021	Golden Sixty	5	Hong Kong	Vincent Ho Chak-yiu	Francis Lui Kin-wai	Stanley Chan Ka Leung	1:33.45
2022	Golden Sixty	6	Hong Kong	Vincent Ho Chak-yiu	Francis Lui Kin-wai	Stanley Chan Ka Leung	1:32.81
2023	Golden Sixty	7	Hong Kong	Vincent Ho Chak-yiu	Francis Lui Kin-wai	Stanley Chan Ka Leung	1:33.34
2024	Beauty Eternal	5	Hong Kong	Zac Purton	John Size	Patrick Kwok Ho Chuen	1:34.52
2025	Red Lion	6	Hong Kong	Hugh Bowman	John Size	The Hon Ronald Arculli GBM GBS JP & Johanna K J Arculli BBS	1:33.21
2026	My Wish	5	Hong Kong	Hugh Bowman	Mark Newnham	Ada Che Xiao Hong, Suki Tang Xianfang & Ruby Hui Like Sea	1:32.37

== See also ==
- List of Hong Kong horse races
