= Hong Kong Classic Cup =

The Hong Kong Classic Cup is a Thoroughbred set weights horse race in Hong Kong for four year olds, run over a distance of 1800 metres. The first three finishers in this race have priority to run in the Hong Kong Derby, which is the most prestigious race on the domestic racing calendar. The race was known as the Hong Kong Derby Trial until 2010.

== Winners since 2006 ==
Year	Winner	Age	Jockey	Trainer	Time
2006	Hello Pretty	4	Gérald Mossé	Francis Lui Kin-wai	1:47.70
2007	Floral Pegasus	4	Gérald Mossé	Tony Cruz	1:48.80
2008	Green Birdie	4	Olivier Doleuze	Caspar Fownes	1:48.60
2009	Unique Jewellery	4	Olivier Doleuze	John Size	1:48.93
2010	King Dancer^{[1]}	4	Gérald Mossé	Sean Woods	1:48.19
2011	Ambitious Dragon	4	Maxime Guyon	Anthony Millard	1:48.03
2012	Zaidan	4	Olivier Doleuze	John Moore	1:48.70
2013	It Has To Be You	4	Timothy Clark	John Size	1:48.91
2014	Designs On Rome	4	Tommy Berry	John Moore	1:47.91
2015	Thunder Fantasy	4	Karis Teetan	John Size	1:48.62
2016	Sun Jewellery	4	Ryan Moore	John Size	1:48.01
2017	Rapper Dragon	4	João Moreira	John Moore	1:46.98
2018	Singapore Sling	4	Chad Schofield	Anthony Millard	1:46.99
2019	Mission Tycoon	4	Derek Leung Ka-chun	Frankie Lor Fu-chuen	1:47.00
2020	Golden Sixty	4	Vincent Ho Chak-yiu	Francis Lui Kin-wai	1:45.88
2021	Healthy Happy	4	Alexis Badel	Frankie Lor Fu-chuen	1:47.21
2022	California Spangle	4	Zac Purton	Tony Cruz	1:46.98
2023	Super Sunny Sing	4	Vincent Ho Chak-yiu	Chris So Wai-yin	1:46.26
2024	Helios Express	4	Hugh Bowman	John Size	1:47.73
2025	Rubylot	4	Brenton Avdulla	David Hayes	1:46.29
2026	Stormy Grove	4	Harry Bentley	Frankie Lor Fu-chuen	1:46.62

^{1} The 2010 winner King Dancer was later exported to Europe and renamed Uramazin.

== See also ==
- List of Hong Kong horse races
