= Good Ba Ba =

American-bred Thoroughbred racehorse

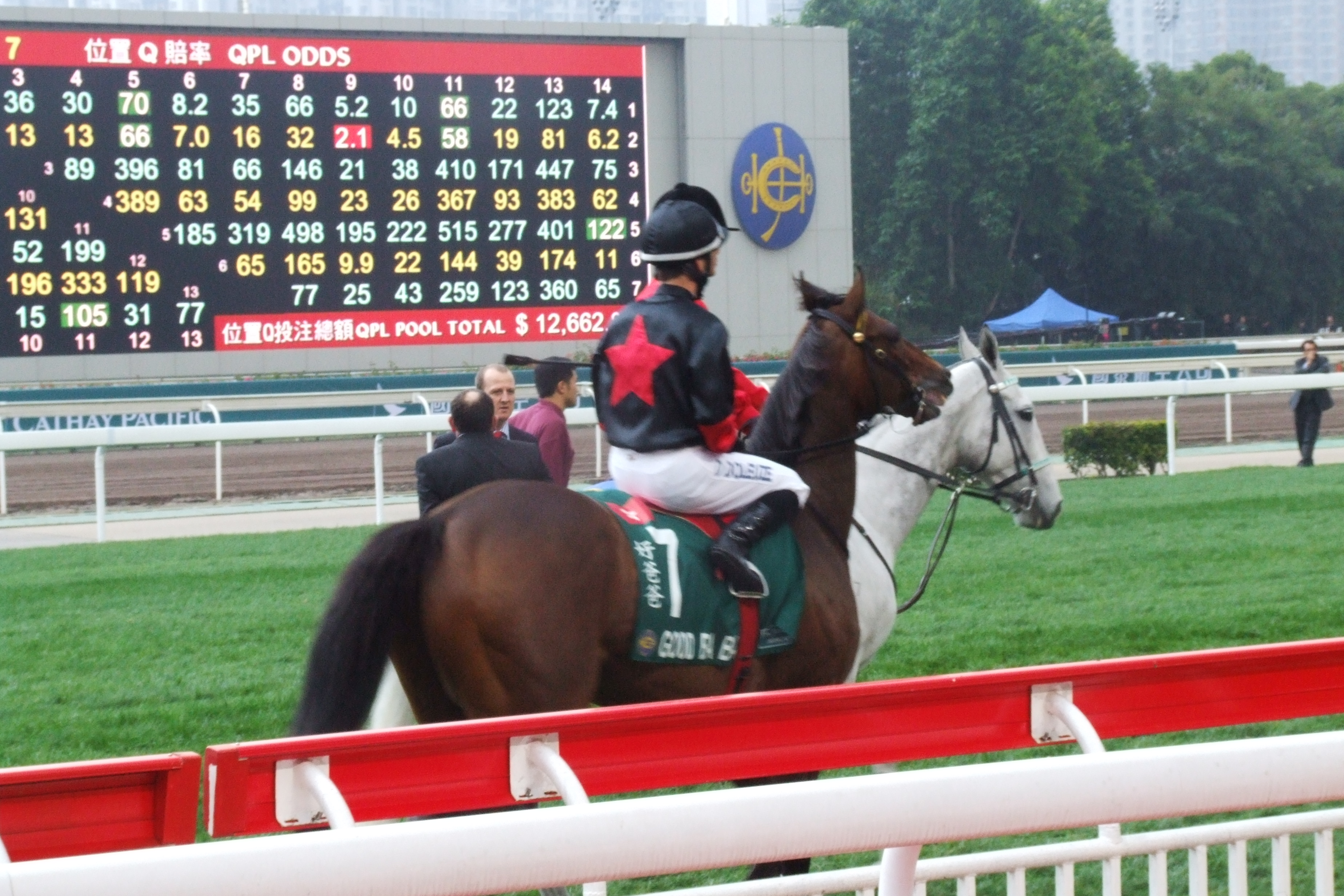
- Good Ba Ba in the Shatin Racecourse after participating the Hong Kong Mile on 12 December 2010
- Sire: Lear Fan
- Grandsire: Roberto
- Dam: Elle Meme
- Damsire: Zilzal
- Sex: Gelding
- Foaled: 2002
- Country: United States
- Colour: Bay
- Breeder: Haras Santa Maria de Araras
- Owner: John Yuen Se Kit
- Trainer: Michael Chang Chun Wai
- Record: 50: 16-5-4
- Earnings: HK$48,161,500 (As of August 13, 2009)

Major wins
- Chairman's Trophy (2007); International Mile Trial (2007); Hong Kong Mile (2007, 2008, 2009); Hong Kong Stewards' Cup (2008, 2009); Queen's Silver Jubilee Cup (2008); Champions Mile (2008)

Awards
- Hong Kong Horse of the Year (2008); Hong Kong Most Popular Horse of the Year (2008); Hong Kong Champion Miler (2008, 2009)
- Last updated on August 13, 2009

Good Ba Ba (Chinese: 好爸爸) (foaled 2002) is a Hong Kong–based Thoroughbred racehorse. In the season of 2007–2008, Good Ba Ba had five consecutive wins in Hong Kong G1 and G2 races. He was voted Hong Kong Horse of the Year for that season.

On December 14, 2008, Good Ba Ba won his second consecutive Hong Kong Mile, setting a new Shatin Racecourse course record time.
