= Hong Kong Horse of the Year =

Thoroughbred horse racing award

Horse of the Year is the most prestigious honor in Thoroughbred horse racing given by racing organizations in a variety of countries around the world.

In Hong Kong, the voting for Horse of the Year is organized by the Hong Kong Jockey Club as part of its annual Hong Kong Jockey Club Champion Awards. The Judging Panel consists of six members from the Hong Kong Jockey Club and the Association of Hong Kong Racing Journalists. Past winners of the award include:

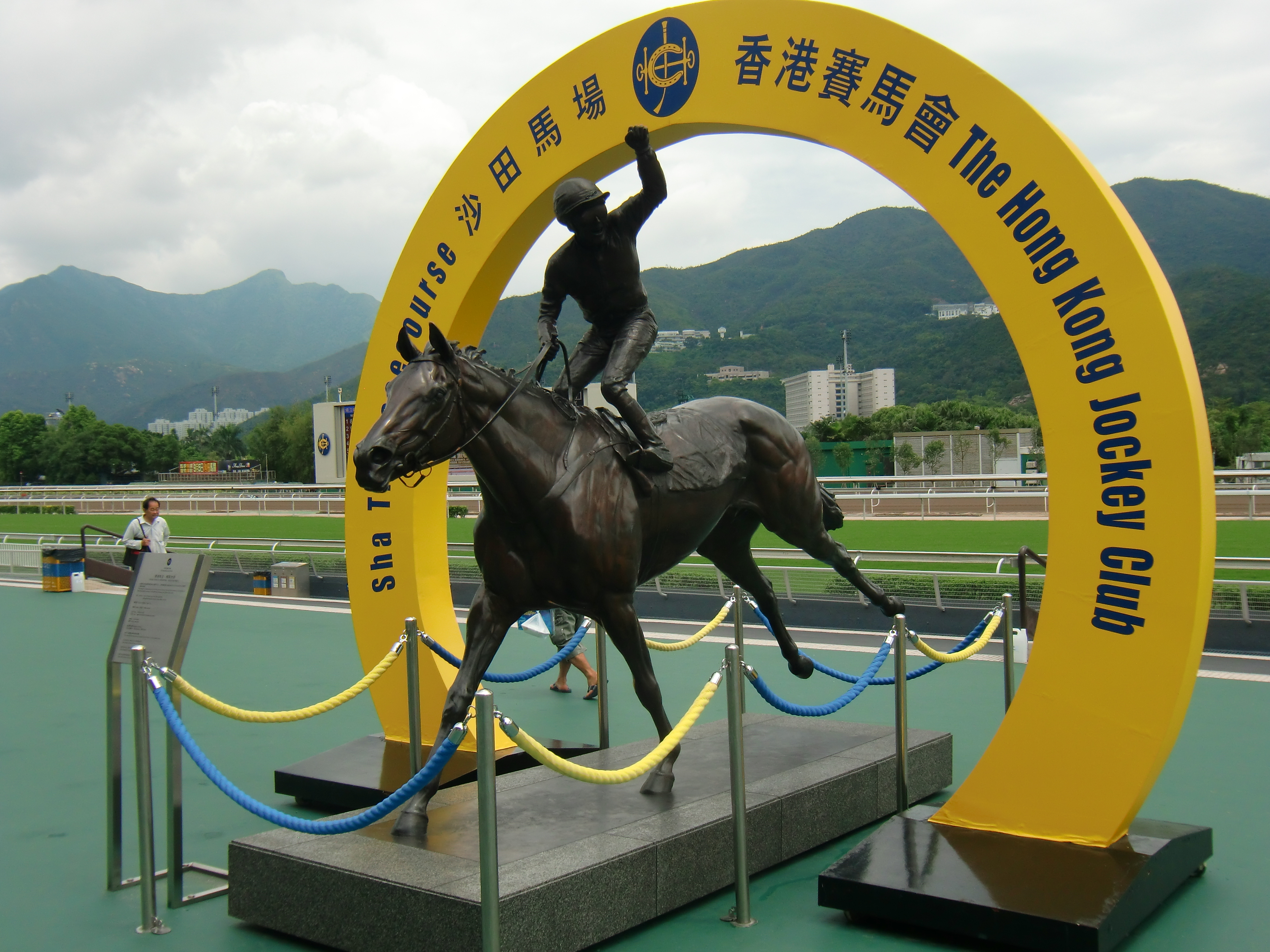
Statue of Silent Witness located in the Shatin Racecourse

Year	Winner
1977-78	Silver Lining
1978-79	Silver Lining
1979-80	Top Gain
1980-81	Silver Lining
1981-82	Football
1982-83	Co-Tack
1983-84	Co-Tack
1984-85	Mystic
1985-86	Yuno When
1986-87	Flying Dancer
1987-88	Top Grade
1988-89	Quicken Away
1989-90	Quicken Away
1990-91	River Verdon
1991-92	River Verdon
1992-93	Helene Star
1993-94	River Verdon
1994-95	Makarpura Star
1995-96	Mr Vitality
1996-97	Privilege
1997-98	Oriental Express
1998-99	Indigenous
1999-00	Fairy King Prawn
2000-01	Fairy King Prawn
2001-02	Electronic Unicorn
2002-03	Grand Delight
2003-04	Silent Witness
2004-05	Silent Witness
2005-06	Bullish Luck
2006-07	Vengeance of Rain
2007-08	Good Ba Ba
2008-09	Viva Pataca
2009-10	Sacred Kingdom
2010-11	Ambitious Dragon
2011-12	Ambitious Dragon
2012-13	Military Attack
2013-14	Designs On Rome
2014-15	Able Friend
2015-16	Werther
2016-17	Rapper Dragon (Posthumous)
2017-18	Beauty Generation
2018-19	Beauty Generation
2019-20	Exultant
2020-21	Golden Sixty
2021-22	Golden Sixty
2022-23	Golden Sixty
2023-24	Romantic Warrior
2024-25	Ka Ying Rising
2025-26	Ka Ying Rising (Joint winners)
2025-26	Romantic Warrior (Joint winners)
