= Hong Kong Jockey Club Champion Awards =

The Hong Kong Jockey Club Champion Awards are given annually by the Hong Kong Jockey Club (HKJC) to the outstanding horses and people in Hong Kong Thoroughbred horse racing.

The most prestigious award for horses is Hong Kong Horse of the Year.

The equivalent in Australia is the Australian Thoroughbred racing awards, in Canada the Sovereign Awards, in the United States the Eclipse Awards, in Japan the JRA Awards and in Europe, the Cartier Racing Awards.

Current awards:

- Hong Kong Horse of the Year
- Hong Kong Most Popular Horse of the Year
- Hong Kong Champion Sprinter
- Hong Kong Champion Miler
- Hong Kong Champion Middle-distance Horse
- Hong Kong Champion Stayer
- Hong Kong Champion Griffin
- Hong Kong Most Improved Horse
