= Vincent C Y Ho =

Hong Kong jockey

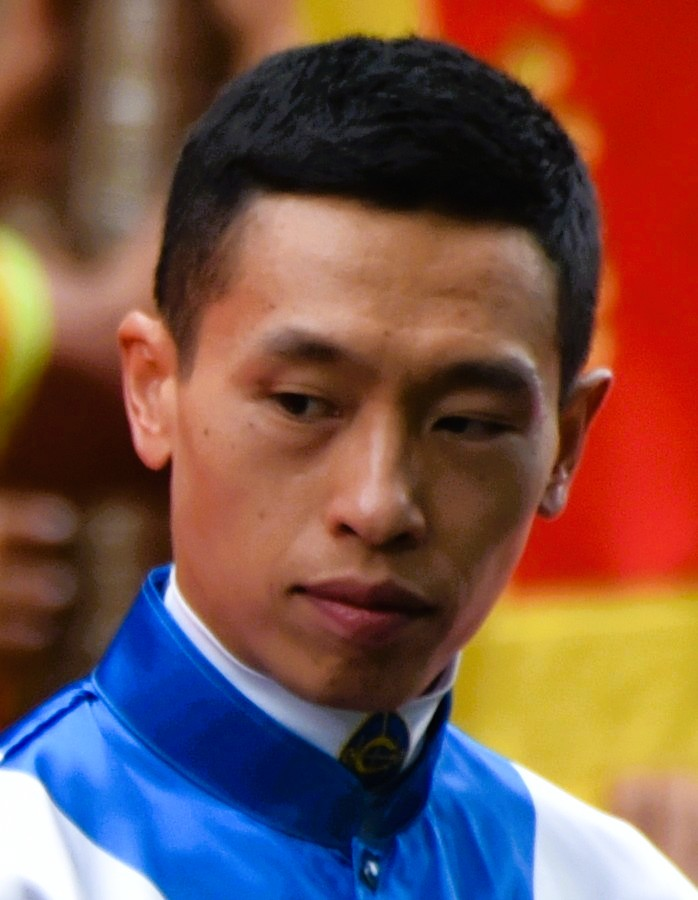
- Ho in February 2026

Personal information
- Native name: 何澤堯
- Nationality: Chinese (Hong Kong)
- Born: 25 May 1990 British Hong Kong

Horse racing career
- Sport: Horse racing

Vincent C Y Ho (Chinese: 何澤堯; Jyutping: Ho4 Zaak6 Jiu4; born 25 May 1990) is a horse racing jockey. He made an impressive start to his riding career with 10 wins in his first season in 2009/10. He became Hong Kong's champion apprentice with 39 wins in 2010/11. In 2012/13 he rode 28 winners, and in 2013/14 season he has notched 22 for a HK total of 116.

== Performance ==
Seasons	Total Rides	No. of Wins	No. of 2nds	No. of 3rds	No. of 4ths	Stakes won
2009/2010	64	10	4	2	8	HK$5,772,075
2010/2011	420	39	43	46	45	HK$30,719,850
2011/2012	238	18	16	32	14	HK$15,021,937
2012/2013	484	27	25	38	36	HK$25,534,000
2013/2014	415	22	24	26	32	HK$20,129,687
2014/2015	526	33	26	31	43	HK$30,624,715
2015/2016	504	21	25	29	46	HK$26,744,525
2016/2017	476	18	21	36	33	HK$23,078,475
2017/2018	458	24	22	32	30	HK$27,797,650
2018/2019	596	56	58	65	70	HK$76,379,815
2019/2020	623	67	60	58	62	HK$126,366,677
2020/2021	614	61	49	54	44	HK$129,742,500
2021/2022	600	50	61	55	53	HK$113,492,110
2022/2023	724	96	75	74	77	HK$160,209,307.5
2023/2024	355	41	35	34	37	HK$87,405,490
2024/2025	256	27	29	24	14	HK$42,179,915

== Major wins ==
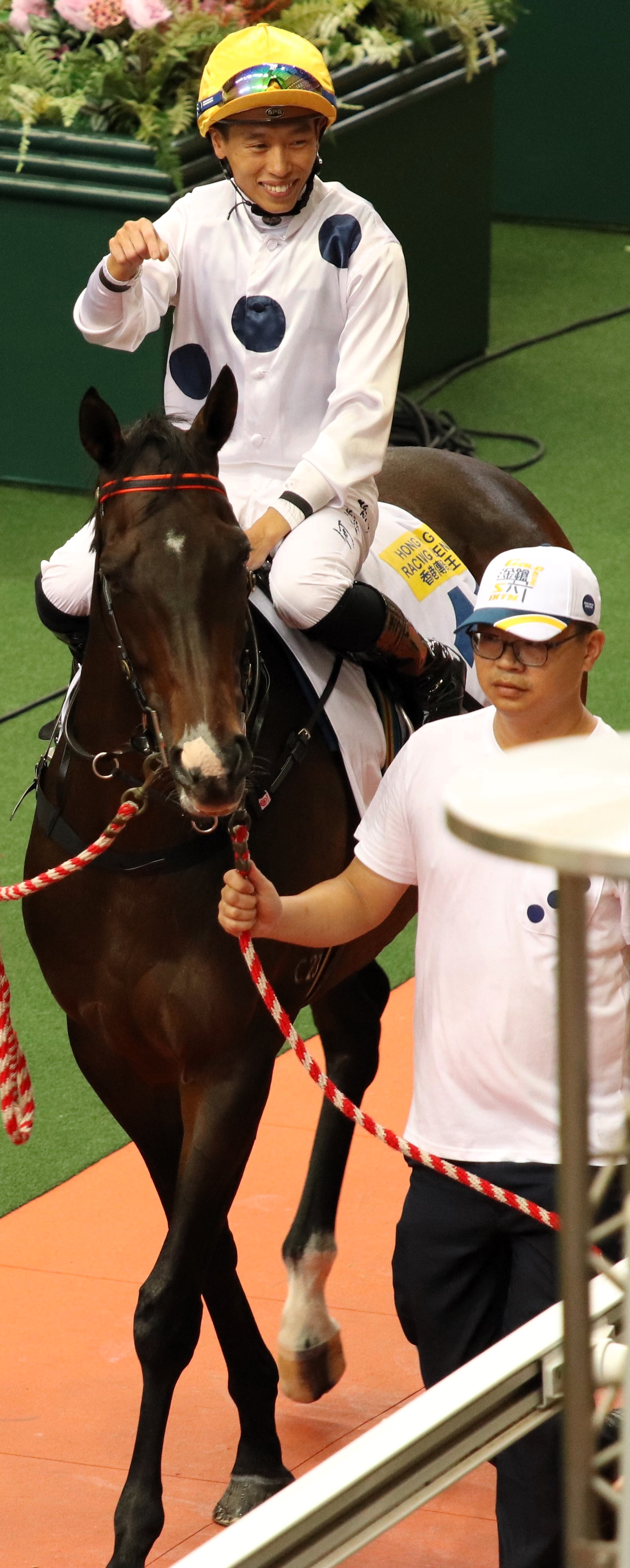
Ho guiding Golden Sixty in his retirement ceremony held at the Sha Tin Racecourse on 22 September 2024

Hong Kong

- Champions Mile - (4) - Southern Legend (2020), Golden Sixty (2021, 2022, 2023)
- Queen Elizabeth II Cup - (1) - Loves Only You (2021)
- Hong Kong Mile - (2) - Golden Sixty (2020, 2021)
- Hong Kong Derby - (1) - Golden Sixty (2020)
- Hong Kong Classic Mile - (1) - Golden Sixty (2020)
- Hong Kong Classic Cup - (1) - Golden Sixty (2020)
- Hong Kong Stewards' Cup - (2) - Golden Sixty (2021, 2023)
- Hong Kong Gold Cup - (2) - Golden Sixty (2021, 2023)
- Centenary Sprint Cup - (1) - Stronger (2022)

== See also ==
- The Hong Kong Jockey Club
