= John Moore (horseman) =

Personal information
- Born: 17 March 1950 (age 76) Sydney, Australia
- Occupation: Trainer

Horse racing career
- Sport: Horse racing
- Career wins: 1,400

Major racing wins
- Hong Kong Cup (1993, 2014); Champions & Chater Cup (1995, 2006, 2007, 2009, 2011, 2017); Hong Kong Derby (1995, 2006, 2009, 2014, 2016, 2017); Hong Kong Gold Cup (1995, 2006, 2008, 2009, 2010, 2013, 2014, 2015, 2016, 2017); Hong Kong Stewards' Cup (2015, 2017); Sha Tin Sprint Trophy (2005, 2006); Hong Kong Classic Mile (1991, 2004, 2006, 2014, 2017); Hong Kong Classic Cup (2012, 2014, 2017); Queen's Silver Jubilee Cup (2002, 2006, 2007, 2010, 2015); Champions Mile (2007, 2010, 2011, 2012, 2013, 2015); Queen Elizabeth II Cup (2007, 2013, 2014); Hong Kong Sprint (2008); Hong Kong Vase (2013); Hong Kong Mile (2011, 2014, 2017); Dubai Golden Shaheen (2014); Singapore Airlines International Cup (2013, 2014, 2015)

Racing awards
- Hong Kong Training Premierships (5)

Significant horses
- Motivation, Sunny Sing, Makarpura Star, Viva Pataca, Able One, Collection, One World, Xtension, Military Attack, Dan Excel, Able Friend, Designs On Rome
- Updated on 20 April 2010

John Moore (born 17 March 1950) is a Thoroughbred racehorse trainer.

Moore was born in Sydney, Australia, The son of jockey and trainer George Moore. He began working in Hong Kong racing as an assistant to his father in 1971. In 1985, John Moore took out his trainers license and built a highly successful career for himself in Hong Kong.

Moore won the 2014 Dubai Golden Shaheen with Hong Kong–based Sterling City. live telecast of 2014 Dubai World Cup broadcast, 29 March 2014.

Moore has won the Hong Kong Trainers Premiership five times and in 2005 broke Brian Kan's record for most career wins by a trainer in Hong Kong racing.

The 55 winners he saddled in 2013–14 brought his career total to 1,400.

== Performance ==
| Seasons | Total Runners | No. of Wins | No. of 2nds | No. of 3rds | No. of 4ths | Stakes won |
|---|---|---|---|---|---|---|
| 2010/2011 | 505 | 74 | 61 | 57 | 46 | HK$106,051,790 |
