= Romantic Warrior (horse) =

Irish born thoroughbred racehorse

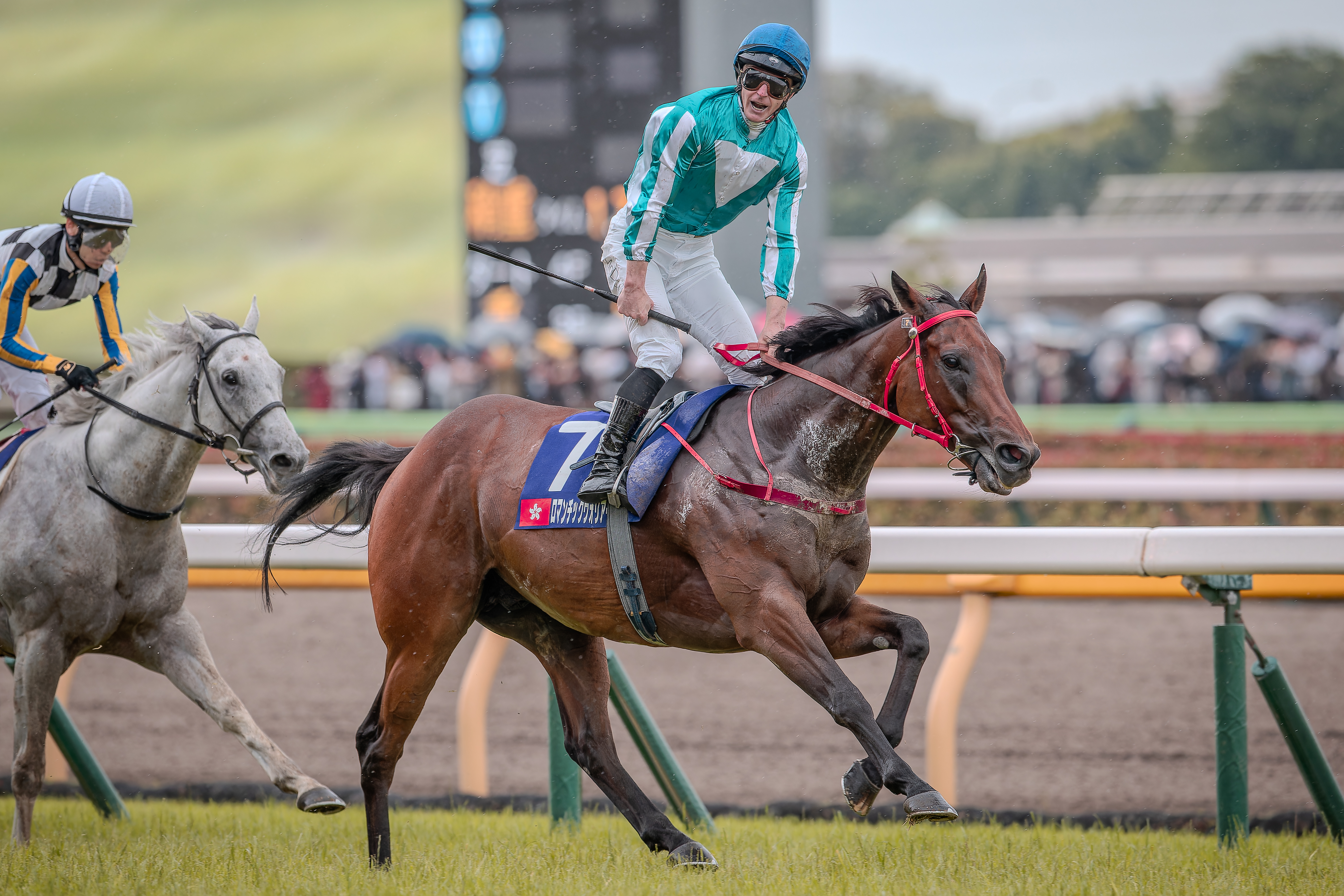
- Romantic Warrior winning the 2024 Yasuda Kinen
- Sire: Acclamation
- Grandsire: Royal Applause
- Dam: Folk Melody (IRE)
- Damsire: Street Cry
- Sex: Gelding
- Foaled: March 18 2018
- Country: Ireland
- Colour: Bay
- Breeder: Corduff Stud & T J Rooney
- Owner: Peter Lau Pak Fai
- Trainer: C. S. (Danny) Shum
- Jockey: James McDonald
- Record: 31: 24-5-0
- Earnings: 288,745,697 HKD; HK: 241,162,197 HKD; AUS: 3,033,750 AUD; JPN: 180,000,000 JPY; SAU: 3,500,000 USD; UAE: 2,110,000 USD

Major wins
- Hong Kong Classic Mile (2022); Hong Kong Derby (2022); Queen Elizabeth II Cup (2022, 2023, 2024, 2026); Jockey Club Cup (2022, 2024, 2025); Hong Kong Cup (2022, 2023, 2024, 2025); W. S. Cox Plate (2023); Yasuda Kinen (2024); Jebel Hatta (2025) Hong Kong Triple Crown Race wins: Stewards' Cup (2026); Hong Kong Gold Cup (2024, 2026); Champions & Chater Cup (2026)

Awards
- Hong Kong Horse of the Year (2024, 2026); 3rd Hong Kong Triple Crown Champion (2026); Hong Kong Champion Four-Year-Old (2022); Hong Kong Champion Middle-distance Horse (2022, 2023, 2024, 2025, 2026); Hong Kong Champion Miler (2026); Hong Kong Champion Stayer (2026)

Romantic Warrior (Chinese: 浪漫勇士, foaled: March 18, 2018) is a multiple Group 1 winning champion thoroughbred racehorse that was born in Ireland and trained in Hong Kong. After arriving in Hong Kong in June of 2021, he scored a five-race winning streak, including a championship of the Hong Kong Classic Mile. He was owned by Peter Lau Pak Fai and trained by Danny Shum Chap Shing.

In 2022, Romantic Warrior was named Champion Middle-Distance Horse, Champion Four-Year-Old, and Most Improved Horse. He is notable for winning the Cox Plate in 2023 and the Hong Kong Cup in 2022, 2023, 2024 and 2025. He also won the Yasuda Kinen in 2024, being the first foreign-trained horse to win at Tokyo Racecourse since Bullish Luck in the 2006 Hong Kong Cup.

Romantic Warrior is the only racehorse to win four Hong Kong Cups. In 2026, Romantic Warrior became the third Hong Kong triple crown horse, winning all three of Hong Kong Stewards' Cup, Hong Kong Gold Cup, and Hong Kong Champions & Chater Cup.

== Racing career ==
Notable performances by Romantic Warrior include:

- 1st 2022 Queen Elizabeth II Cup (2000m, Sha Tin) beating Tourbillon Diamond and Panfield
- 1st 2022 Hong Kong Cup (2000m, Sha Tin) beating Danon The Kid and Money Catcher
- 1st 2023 Queen Elizabeth II Cup (2000m, Sha Tin) beating Prognosis and Dubai Honour
- 1st 2023 Cox Plate (2040m WFA, The Valley) beating Mr Brightside and Alligator Blood
- 1st 2023 Hong Kong Cup (2000m, Sha Tin) beating Luxembourg and Hishi Iguazu
- 1st 2024 Hong Kong Gold Cup (2000m, Sha Tin) beating Voyage Bubble and Nimble Nimbus
- 1st 2024 Queen Elizabeth II Cup (2000m, Sha Tin) beating Prognosis and North Bridge
- 1st 2024 Yasuda Kinen (1600m, Tokyo) beating Namur and Soul Rush
- 1st 2024 Hong Kong Cup (2000m, Sha Tin) beating Liberty Island and Tastiera
- 1st 2025 Jebel Hatta (1800m, Meydan) beating Poker Face and Holloway Boy
- 1st 2025 Hong Kong Cup (2000m, Sha Tin) beating Bellagio Opera and Quisisana
- 1st 2026 Stewards' Cup (1600m, Sha Tin) beating Lucky Sweynesse and Voyage Bubble
- 1st 2026 Queen Elizabeth II Cup (2000 m, Sha Tin) beating Masquerade Ball and Sosie
- 1st 2026 Champions & Chater Cup (2400 m, Sha Tin) beating Numbers and Deep Monster

=== 2021: Coming to Hong Kong ===
Foaled in Ireland in 2018, the son of Acclamation was sourced by the former top jockey Michael Kinane and sold at the Hong Kong International Sale in 2021 to Peter Lau Pak Fai for HKD 4.8M (AUD 814,236). Romantic Warrior was then sent to the Manton Estate in Wiltshire, England, for further training before coming to Hong Kong as a racehorse.

On 20 October 2021, he made his debut at the Happy Valley Racecourse winning a Group IV 1200m race ridden by Joao Moreira. He then won another four races at Happy Valley and Sha Tin.

=== 2022: Reaching four years old ===
Upon reaching four years of age in the second half of his first season, Romantic Warrior became eligible to participate in the Hong Kong Four-Year-Old Classic Series during Sha Tin's racing season, under a new jockey, Karis Teetan. His first stop was The Kong Classic Mile where he placed third behind Packing Victory and California Spangle. He won by half a length to extend his winning streak to five, but the sequence was terminated in the next race in the series the Hong Kong Classic Cup by California Spangle.

Danny Shum, Romantic Warrior’s trainer, remarked that he still had great potential to win the BMW Hong Kong Derby.

I felt confident for the Derby because he is an easy ride and he didn’t fight during the race. A strong pace is easy, a slow pace he can go a little bit forward and the distance of 2,000m, especially against the four-year-olds, he can handle no problem.

Romantic Warrior and California Spangle dueled for a third time in the Derby with Romantic Warrior prevailing ahead to win the first and last jewel of the series. His triumph in the Derby was also Shum's first success in the race. He would continue to win more Group I races in 2022, including the Queen Elizabeth II Cup in April 2022, to conclude his first full season of racing. And at the end of 2022 his first win in the Longines Hong Kong Cup that December.

=== 2023: Group I champion and overseas expedition ===
Beginning in 2023, the Romantic Warrior team became more focused on joining Group I races as the 2nd best racehorse in the world according to Longines' World's Best Racehorse Rankings, with a rating of 123. He challenged Golden Sixty, three-time Hong Kong Horse of the Year, in the Steward's Cup and the Citi Hong Kong Gold Cup but narrowly lost to the title holder on both occasions.

In April 2023, having won the race in the previous year, Romantic Warrior raced in the Queen Elizabeth Cup for the second time. Against overseas challengers such as Prognosis, Danon the Kid, Geraldina from Japan, and Dubai Honour, Romantic Warrior finished the 2000-meter race with first place at 2:01:92. McDonald viewed his steed very positively.

He’s a world-class horse and put in a performance just like he did in December. There wasn’t one part of the race where I thought he wasn’t right – he was always going to explode for me – and the race panned out beautifully. He’s a world-class horse. It took an absolute weapon (Golden Sixty) to run him down last time but he’s a great 2000m horse and I really enjoy riding him.

After the race, which became Romantic Warrior's 10th win, Shum was interested in taking the steed overseas to prestigious competitions. The first one he had in mind was the Tenno Sho (Autumn) in Japan. His ex-boss Ivan Allan won the Yasuda Kinen with Fairy King Prawn and he wished to emulate the success.

Despite success in previous matches, Romantic Warrior under Zac Purton in the Chater Cup lost to the Russian Emperor, returning to Hong Kong after an expedition to Qatar. After more than a month-long hiatus, Shum confirmed in early July that Romantic Warrior would not be going to Japan. Instead, it would prepare to run in Australia, with the Cox Plate in October being the biggest target.

=== The path to Cox Plate champion ===
With a two-month hiatus following the end of the 2022/23 racing season, the Romantic Warrior team was fully prepared for the steed's first overseas expedition as it safely arrived in Australia in mid-September. There, Romantic Warrior would have 2 assignments. The first was participating in the Group I Turnbull Stakes at Flemington, and the second would be the ultimate objective, the W. S. Cox Plate at Moonee Valley.

Romantic Warrior finished 4th behind Gold Trip in the Turnbull Stakes on 7 October 2023 over 2000m, despite being the favorite. After the race, the trainer Shum was "not happy but not disappointed." Shum's biggest goal was always on the Cox Plate and the Turnbull Stakes was just a lead-up race to see how the left-turn and the Melbourne surface could be managed. McDonald also believed that the horse would be brought to the most suitable condition for the Cox Plate.

The Cox Plate was run on 28 October 2023, on a sunny Saturday at Moonee Valley. Romantic Warrior starting from the 7th barrier had a smooth start and managed to stay in the 4th place just behind the leaders. He stably remained in that position until the final curve when he galloped and beat Mr Brightside by a nose with Alligator Blood third. Romantic Warrior was declared the champion of the Cox Plate, making him the first winner from Hong Kong. It was James McDonald's second win in the race, having won the previous year with Anamoe.

"This means so much. I can't believe it, I thought I got beat [...] It means so much. I had so much to do with him. I've been singing his praises about how much he's improved and I needed to get a good run. I felt I gave him the best possible run I could and we won the Cox Plate baby!"

=== The Cox Plate champion: victor of the Hong Kong Cup ===
Hong Kong's victory in Australia was a great inspiration to many citizens in the city. In December, Romantic Warrior would race in the Hong Kong International Races on 12 December, particularly in the clock-wise Group I 2000m-long Hong Kong Cup. As expected, the race invited rivals from other countries to compete with the local competitors. Some of the renowned horses included Luxembourg from Ireland and Prognosis from Japan.

With a smooth start, McDonald closely followed the leading horses and stably positioned himself in 4th place behind Nimble Nimbus, Champion Dragon, and Sword Point, who was in the lead. Meanwhile, Luxembourg positioned itself behind the center. After the last curve, McDonald galloped 400m before the goal. The finale was a showdown between Romantic Warrior, Luxembourg, Nimble Nimbus, and Prognosis. Despite Luxembourg's final struggle to surpass Romantic Warrior in the final 50 meters, the latter still emerged victorious, winning by a nose.

The Hong Kong Cup was Romantic Warrior's other victory after winning the Cox Plate. As told by McDonald, it might have been the toughest racehorse he has ever sat on. “He’s got a heart as big as a lion. His courage, his will to win is something I’ve never felt before. I’ve ridden some fantastic racehorses – unbelievable ones – and he’s right up there.” The success in the HK$36 million (~US$4.6 million) Hong Kong Cup catapulted Romantic Warrior's earnings to above HK$100 million and marked his 12th win.

== Racing statistics ==
Date	Race	Track	Class	Distance (Condition)	Weight (lbs)	Result	Time	Winning (Losing) Margin	Jockey	Winner (2nd Place)	Ref
2021-22 season – Three-year-old season
20 Oct 2021	Tiger Prawn Handicap	Happy Valley	C4	Turf 1200 m (Good to Firm)	126	1st	1:09.48	1 1/2 lengths	Joao Moreira	(A Smile Like Yours)	
24 Nov 2021	Murrayfield Handicap	Happy Valley	C4	Turf 1200 m (Good)	133	1st	1:09.41	1 length	Joao Moreira	(Melbourne Hall)	
18 Dec 2021	F-Style Pt in Style; Collection Handicap	Sha Tin	C3	Turf 1200 m (Good)	122	1st	1:09.00	1 3/4 lengths	Joao Moreira	(Armour Eagle)	
16 Jan 2022	Hoi Lai Handicap	Sha Tin	C3	Turf 1400 m (Good)	130	1st	1:21.39	1 1/4 lengths	Joao Moreira	(Lucky With You)	
30 Jan 2022	Hong Kong Classic Mile	Sha Tin	L	Turf 1600 m (Good)	126	1st	1:33.80	1/2 length	Karis Teetan	(California Spangle)	
27 Feb 2022	Hong Kong Classic Cup	Sha Tin	L	Turf 1800 m (Good)	126	4th	1:47.38	(2 1/2 lengths)	Karis Teetan	California Spangle	
20 Mar 2022	Hong Kong Derby	Sha Tin	L	Turf 2000 m (Good)	126	1st	2:00.23	head	Karis Teetan	(California Spangle)	
24 Apr 2022	Queen Elizabeth II Cup	Sha Tin	G1	Turf 2000 m (Good to Firm)	126	1st	2:00.13	2 lengths	Karis Teetan	(Tourbillon Diamond)	
2022-23 season – Four-year-old season
20 Nov 2022	Jockey Club Cup	Sha Tin	G2	Turf 2000 m (Good to Firm)	128	1st	1:59.23	1 1/4 lengths	James McDonald	(Tourbillon Diamond)	
11 Dec 2022	Hong Kong Cup	Sha Tin	G1	Turf 2000 m (Good)	126	1st	1:59.70	4 1/2 lengths	James McDonald	(Danon The Kid)	
29 Jan 2023	Stewards' Cup	Sha Tin	G1	Turf 1600 m (Good)	126	2nd	1:34.15	(1 length)	Karis Teetan	Golden Sixty	
26 Feb 2023	Hong Kong Gold Cup	Sha Tin	G1	Turf 2000 m (Good to Firm)	126	2nd	2:00.02	(head)	Karis Teetan	Golden Sixty	
30 Apr 2023	Queen Elizabeth II Cup	Sha Tin	G1	Turf 2000 m (Good)	126	1st	2:01.92	2 lengths	James McDonald	(Prognosis)	
28 May 2023	Champions & Chater Cup	Sha Tin	G1	Turf 2400 m (Good)	126	2nd	2:26.92	(neck)	Zac Purton	Russian Emperor	
2023-24 season – Five-year-old season
7 Oct 2023	Turnbull Stakes	Flemington	G1	Turf 2000 m (Good)	130	4th	2:02.24	(4 lengths)	James McDonald	Gold Trip	
28 Oct 2023	W. S. Cox Plate	Moonee Valley	G1	Turf 2040 m (Good)	130	1st	2:03.16	nose	James McDonald	(Mr Brightside)	
10 Dec 2023	Hong Kong Cup	Sha Tin	G1	Turf 2000 m (Good)	126	1st	2:02.00	short head	James McDonald	(Luxembourg)	
25 Feb 2024	Hong Kong Gold Cup	Sha Tin	G1	Turf 2000 m (Good)	126	1st	2:00.31	neck	James McDonald	(Voyage Bubble)	
28 Apr 2024	Queen Elizabeth II Cup	Sha Tin	G1	Turf 2000 m (Yielding)	126	1st	2:01.02	neck	James McDonald	(Prognosis)	
2 Jun 2024	Yasuda Kinen	Tokyo	G1	Turf 1600 m (Good)	128	1st	1:32.30	1/2 length	James McDonald	(Namur)	
2024-25 season – Six-year-old season
17 Nov 2024	Jockey Club Cup	Sha Tin	G2	Turf 2000 m (Good)	128	1st	1:59.70	4 1/4 lengths	James McDonald	(Ka Ying Generation)	
8 Dec 2024	Hong Kong Cup	Sha Tin	G1	Turf 2000 m (Good)	126	1st	2:00.51	1 1/2 lengths	James McDonald	(Liberty Island)	
24 Jan 2025	Jebel Hatta	Meydan	G1	Turf 1800 m (Good)	126	1st	R1:45.10	4 1/2 lengths	James McDonald	(Poker Face)	
22 Feb 2025	Saudi Cup	King Abdulaziz	G1	Dirt 1800 m (Fast)	126	2nd	1:49.14	(neck)	James McDonald	Forever Young	
5 Apr 2025	Dubai Turf	Meydan	G1	Turf 1800 m (Good)	126	2nd	1:45.84	(nose)	James McDonald	Soul Rush	
2025-26 season – Seven-year-old season
23 Nov 2025	Jockey Club Cup	Sha Tin	G2	Turf 2000 m (Good to Firm)	128	1st	2:03.72	1 1/2 lengths	James McDonald	(Voyage Bubble)	
14 Dec 2025	Hong Kong Cup	Sha Tin	G1	Turf 2000 m (Good)	126	1st	2:02.29	1 3/4 lengths	James McDonald	(Bellagio Opera)	
25 Jan 2026	Stewards' Cup	Sha Tin	G1	Turf 1600 m (Good to Firm)	126	1st	1:32.60	1 3/4 lengths	James McDonald	(Lucky Sweynesse)	
1 Mar 2026	Hong Kong Gold Cup	Sha Tin	G1	Turf 2000 m (Good)	126	1st	1:59.77	4 lengths	James McDonald	(Ensued)	
26 Apr 2026	Queen Elizabeth II Cup	Sha Tin	G1	Turf 2000 m (Good to Firm)	126	1st	2:00.64	1 length	James McDonald	(Masquerade Ball)	
24 May 2026	Champions & Chater Cup	Sha Tin	G1	Turf 2400 m (Good to Firm)	126	1st	2:26.67	1/2 length	James McDonald	(Numbers)	

- R in the chart and the time written in red indicates the horse finished in record time.

== Retirement ==
Romantic Warrior's retirement from racing was announced on 2 September 2026. According to a statement released by the Hong Kong Jockey Club, his retirement came after imaging scans indicated an injury to his right front leg. Romantic Warrior already had screws inserted into his left front leg the previous year.

== Pedigree ==
Pedigree of Romantic Warrior (IRE), bay gelding, 2018
Sire Acclamation (GB) 1999	Royal Applause (GB); 1993	Waajib (IRE); 1983	Try My Best (USA); 1975
Sire Acclamation (GB) 1999	Royal Applause (GB); 1993	Waajib (IRE); 1983	Coryana (IRE); 1976
Sire Acclamation (GB) 1999	Royal Applause (GB); 1993	Flying Melody (IRE); 1979	Auction Ring (USA); 1972
Sire Acclamation (GB) 1999	Royal Applause (GB); 1993	Flying Melody (IRE); 1979	Whispering Star (GB); 1963
Sire Acclamation (GB) 1999	Princess Athena (IRE); 1985	Ahonoora (GB); 1975	Lorenzaccio (GB); 1965
Sire Acclamation (GB) 1999	Princess Athena (IRE); 1985	Ahonoora (GB); 1975	Helen Nichols (GB); 1966
Sire Acclamation (GB) 1999	Princess Athena (IRE); 1985	Shopping Wise (GB); 1965	Floribunda (GB); 1958
Sire Acclamation (GB) 1999	Princess Athena (IRE); 1985	Shopping Wise (GB); 1965	Sea Melody (GB); 1957
Dam Folk Melody (IRE) 2011	Street Cry (IRE); 1998	Machiavellian (USA); 1987	Mr Prospector (USA); 1970
Dam Folk Melody (IRE) 2011	Street Cry (IRE); 1998	Machiavellian (USA); 1987	Coup de Folie (USA); 1982
Dam Folk Melody (IRE) 2011	Street Cry (IRE); 1998	Helen Street (GB); 1982	Troy (GB); 1976
Dam Folk Melody (IRE) 2011	Street Cry (IRE); 1998	Helen Street (GB); 1982	Waterway (FR); 1976
Dam Folk Melody (IRE) 2011	Folk Opera (IRE); 2004	Singspiel (IRE); 1992	In the Wings (GB); 1986
Dam Folk Melody (IRE) 2011	Folk Opera (IRE); 2004	Singspiel (IRE); 1992	Glorious Song (CAN); 1976
Dam Folk Melody (IRE) 2011	Folk Opera (IRE); 2004	Skiphall (GB); 1998	Halling (USA); 1991
Dam Folk Melody (IRE) 2011	Folk Opera (IRE); 2004	Skiphall (GB); 1998	Minskip (USA); 1988
