= Bauhinia Sprint Trophy =

Bauhinia Sprint Trophy is a Group 3 Thoroughbred horse race in Hong Kong, run at Sha Tin over 1,000 metres in December/January. Horses rated 90 and above are qualified to enter the race. The race held Group One status until 2004 and was won twice, 2004 and 2005, by Silent Witness.

== Winners ==
Year	Winner	Age	Jockey	Trainer
2000	Holy Grail	5	David Harrison	Ivan Allan
2001	Fairy King Prawn	5	Robbie Fradd	Ivan Allan
2002	Charming City	5	Basil Marcus	David Hayes
2003	Grand Delight	5	Shane Dye	John Size
2004	Silent Witness	4	Felix Coetzee	Tony Cruz
2005	Silent Witness	5	Felix Coetzee	Tony Cruz
2006	Billet Express	5	Alex Lai Hoi-wing	John Moore
2007	Scintillation	6	Eric Saint-Martin	Danny Shum Chap-shing
2008	Able Prince	7	Darren Beadman	John Moore
2009	Kildare	4	Howard Cheng Yue-tin	Derek Cruz
2010	Craig's Dragon	5	William Pike	John Moore
2011	Sweet Sanette	5	Greg Cheyne	Anthony Millard
2012	Little Bridge	5	Zac Purton	Danny Shum Chap-shing
2013	Go Baby Go	5	Tye Angland	Dennis Yip Chor-hong
2014	Divine Ten	4	Douglas Whyte	Me Tsui Yu-sak
2016	Not Listenin'tome	5	Zac Purton	John Moore
2017	Amazing Kids	5	João Moreira	John Size
2018	Premiere	4	Karis Teetan	John Size
2019 (Jan)	Jolly Banner	7	Matthew Poon	Ricky Yiu Poon-fai
2019 (Dec)	Big Party	4	Grant Van Niekerk	Frankie Lor Fu-chuen
2021	Explosive Witness	6	Alexis Badel	Caspar Fownes
2022	Master Eight	4	João Moreira	Frankie Lor Fu-chuen
2023	Sight Success	6	Vagner Borges	John Size
2024	Whizz Kid	5	Harry Bentley	Tony Cruz
2025	Howdeepisyourlove	5	Zac Purton	John Size
2026	Stellar Express	6	Andrea Atzeni	John Size

== See also ==
- List of Hong Kong horse races
