= Voyage Bubble =

Australian-bred thoroughbred racehorse

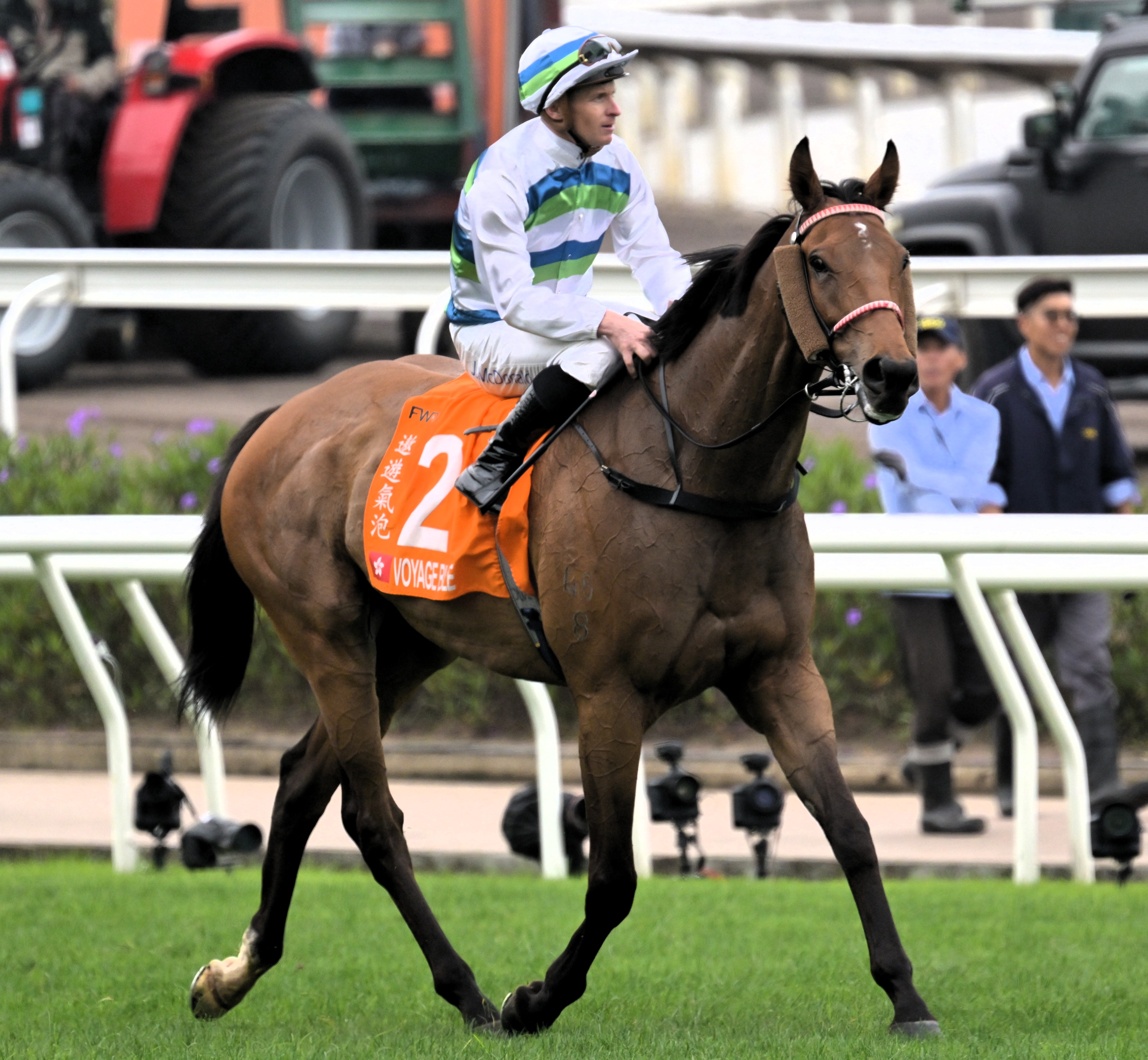
- Sire: Deep Field
- Grandsire: Northern Meteor
- Dam: Raheights
- Damsire: Rahy
- Sex: Gelding
- Foaled: November 3, 2018
- Country: Australia
- Colour: Bay/Brown
- Breeder: Torryburn Stud
- Owner: Sunshine and Moonlight Syndicate
- Trainer: Ricky P. F. Yiu
- Jockey: James McDonald; Zac Purton
- Record: 30: 12-8-4
- Earnings: HKD$130,250,975

Major wins
- Hong Kong Stewards' Cup (2024, 2025); Hong Kong Mile (2024, 2025); Hong Kong Gold Cup (2025); Champions & Chater Cup (2025)

Awards
- 2nd Hong Kong Triple Crown Champion (2025); Hong Kong Champion Miler; Hong Kong Champion Stayer

Voyage Bubble (Chinese: 遨遊氣泡, foaled 3 November 2018) is a six time group 1 winning Australian-bred thoroughbred racehorse that raced in Hong Kong.

Voyage Bubble is the second horse to complete the Hong Kong Triple Crown after River Verdon, completed in the 2025 season. He is also a two-time winner of the Hong Kong Stewards' Cup and a two-time winner of the Hong Kong Mile. He was rated at 121 on the 2025 edition of the IFHA's World's Best Racehorse Rankings, securing joint 22nd.

== Background ==
Voyage Bubble is a bay thoroughbred with a star and a white left hind sock. He was bred by Torryburn Stud in New South Wales, Australia, sired by Deep Field out of the Rahy mare Raheights.

Sold at the Inglis Classic Yearling Sale in 2020 for AUD$380,000 to Ricky Yiu, he went for the highest price on the second day of the sale.

Voyage Bubble's sire Deep Field is an Australian-bred breeding stallion and successful racehorse, winning the group two The Damien Oliver and placing third in the group one Black Caviar Lightning. Deep Field is a successful sire at stud, having also sired Al Muthana, Portland Sky, and Sky Field. His dam Raheights is a four-time winning racemare and dam of six foals to race, with Voyage Bubble her most successful to date.

== Racing Career ==
=== 2021/2022: Three Year Old Season ===
Voyage Bubble made his first race start under Karis Teetan in the class two Tathong Channel Handicap, placing second by a short head behind Miracle Victory. On his next start, he won the Happy Zero Handicap three lengths ahead of Brave Dreams and Fortune Carrier under Zac Purton. He then stepped into class three races, placing second and fifth before winning his final race of the season, a length and a quarter ahead of Maldives.

=== 2022/2023: Four Year Old Season ===
Voyage Bubble placed in his first two races of the season before winning the class three Ping Shan handicap over a mile under Derek K C Leung, beating Happy Together and La City Blanche. He won the first leg of the Four-Year-Old Classic Series in the Hong Kong Classic Mile, a length and a quarter ahead of Tuchel and Packing Treadmill. He placed sixth in the Hong Kong Classic Cup behind Super Sunny Sing before winning the Hong Kong Derby in an upset, finishing a short head ahead of Tuchel and Beauty Eternal. Voyage Bubble placed fourth in the Champions Mile behind three time Horse of the Year racehorse Golden Sixty in the last race of his season.

=== 2023/2024: Five Year Old Season ===
Voyage Bubble placed in the first two races of his season before winning the Hong Kong Stewards' Cup for the first time ahead of Beauty Eternal. He placed second in the Hong Kong Gold Cup behind Romantic Warrior while aimed towards the Dubai Turf at Meydan Racecourse, where he finished thirteenth behind the Irish-bred racehorse Facteur Cheval. He placed third in the Champions Mile behind Beauty Eternal before travelling to Japan for the Yasuda Kinen. He arrived in Japan on the 21st of May with fellow Hong Kong based racehorse Romantic Warrior, placing seventeenth behind Romantic Warrior in the race.

=== 2024/2025: Six Year Old Season ===
Voyage Bubble made his debut for the season in the group two Sha Tin Trophy, placing second behind Galaxy Patch before winning the Jockey Club Mile. He defeated the Japanese raider Soul Rush and Beauty Joy in the Hong Kong Mile before starting his Triple Crown campaign, winning the Stewards' Cup for the second time and the Hong Kong Gold Cup before coming second to Red Lion in the Champions Mile by a short head. His final race of the season was the Champions & Chater Cup, winning three and a half lengths ahead of Rubylot in his first attempt at running a race at 2,400 metres.

With the Stewards' Cup, the Hong Kong Gold Cup, and the Champions & Chater Cup complete, Voyage Bubble became the second horse to win all three legs of Hong Kong's Triple Crown in one season after River Verdon. He was awarded the title of Hong Kong Champion Miler and Hong Kong Champion Stayer for his wins in the season.

=== 2025/2026: Seven Year Old Season ===
Voyage Bubble went winless for the first two races of his season, finishing twelfth in the Sha Tin Trophy behind My Wish, then placing second in the Jockey Club Cup behind Romantic Warrior. He later won the Hong Kong Mile by half a length ahead of Soul Rush, successfully winning the race two years in a row before placing third in the Stewards' Cup behind Romantic Warrior and former Hong Kong Champion Sprinter Lucky Sweynesse.

== Pedigree ==
Pedigree of Voyage Bubble (AUS), bay/brown gelding, 2018
Sire Deep Field (AUS) 2010	Northern Meteor (AUS); 2005	Encosta De Lago (AUS); 1993	Fairy King (USA); 1982
Sire Deep Field (AUS) 2010	Northern Meteor (AUS); 2005	Encosta De Lago (AUS); 1993	Shoal Creek (AUS); 1988
Sire Deep Field (AUS) 2010	Northern Meteor (AUS); 2005	Explosive (USA); 1990	Fappiano (USA); 1977
Sire Deep Field (AUS) 2010	Northern Meteor (AUS); 2005	Explosive (USA); 1990	Scuff (USA); 1979
Sire Deep Field (AUS) 2010	Listen Here (AUS); 2004	Elusive Quality (USA); 1993	Gone West (USA); 1984
Sire Deep Field (AUS) 2010	Listen Here (AUS); 2004	Elusive Quality (USA); 1993	Touch of Greatness (USA); 1986
Sire Deep Field (AUS) 2010	Listen Here (AUS); 2004	Announce (AUS); 1994	Military Plume (NZ); 1983
Sire Deep Field (AUS) 2010	Listen Here (AUS); 2004	Announce (AUS); 1994	Theme Song (NZ); 1987
Dam Raheights (AUS) 2002	Rahy (USA); 1985	Blushing Groom (FR); 1974	Red God (USA); 1954
Dam Raheights (AUS) 2002	Rahy (USA); 1985	Blushing Groom (FR); 1974	Runaway Bride (GB); 1962
Dam Raheights (AUS) 2002	Rahy (USA); 1985	Glorious Song (CAN); 1976	Halo (USA); 1969
Dam Raheights (AUS) 2002	Rahy (USA); 1985	Glorious Song (CAN); 1976	Ballade (USA); 1972
Dam Raheights (AUS) 2002	Laoub (USA); 1998	Red Ransom (USA); 1987	Roberto (USA); 1969
Dam Raheights (AUS) 2002	Laoub (USA); 1998	Red Ransom (USA); 1987	Arabia (USA); 1977
Dam Raheights (AUS) 2002	Laoub (USA); 1998	Liseux (USA); 1989	Steady Growth (CAN); 1976
Dam Raheights (AUS) 2002	Laoub (USA); 1998	Liseux (USA); 1989	Gay Sonnet (USA); 1969
