= Hong Kong Stewards' Cup =

The Stewards' Cup
- Waikuku winning The Stewards' Cup in 2022.
- Class: Group 1
- Location: Sha Tin Racecourse; Hong Kong
- Inaugurated: 1954
- Race type: Flat / Thoroughbred
- Website: Stewards' Cup

Race information
- Distance: 1,600 meters (About 8 furlongs / 1 mile)
- Surface: Turf
- Track: Right-handed
- Qualification: Three-years-old and up
- Weight: 115 lb (3y); 126 lb (4y+); Allowances; 4 lb for fillies and mares 6 lb for N. Hemisphere 3-y-o
- Purse: HK$12,000,000 (2022)

The Stewards' Cup is a Hong Kong Thoroughbred horse race held annually during the latter part of January at Sha Tin Racecourse. A Group One race that offers a purse of HK$12,000,000, it is run on turf over a distance of 1600 meters and is open to horses three years of age and older. The first leg of the Hong Kong Triple Crown, it is followed by the Hong Kong Gold Cup in February and the Hong Kong Champions & Chater Cup in late May/early June.

== Winners since 1993 ==
| Year | Winner | Age | Jockey | Trainer | Owner | Time |
|---|---|---|---|---|---|---|
| 1993 | River Verdon | 6 | Basil Marcus | David Hill | Oswald Cheung & Ronald Arculli | 1:35.30 |
| 1994 | Right Way | 5 | Willie Ryan | Brian Kan Ping-chee | Samuel & Clarisse Wong | 1:35.20 |
| 1995 | Mr. Vitality | 4 | Basil Marcus | Ivan Allan | Larry Yung | 1:33.50 |
| 1996 | Michael's Choice | 4 | Éric Legrix | Patrick Biancone | Michael Ying Lee Yuen | 1:35.10 |
| 1997 | Smashing Pumpkin | 4 | Basil Marcus | David Hayes | Fame & Fortune Syndicate | 1:34.10 |
| 1998 | Billion Win | 4 | Felix Coetzee | Ivan Allan | Hui Chun Keung | 1:33.90 |
| 1999 | Not Run | | | | | |
| 2000 | Resfa | 5 | Basil Marcus | David Hayes | J.Lau Po Man /A. Woo Wai See | 1:35.40 |
| 2001 | Fairy King Prawn | 5 | Robbie Fradd | Ivan Allan | Mr & Mrs Lau Sak Hong | 1:35.10 |
| 2002 | Electronic Unicorn | 6 | Robbie Fradd | John Size | Lo Ying Bin | 1:35.20 |
| 2003 | Electronic Unicorn | 7 | Robbie Fradd | John Size | Lo Ying Bin | 1:34.90 |
| 2004 | Super Kid | 4 | Shane Dye | John Size | Wong Yuk Kwan | 1:37.30 |
| 2005 | Bullish Luck | 6 | Christophe Soumillon | Tony Cruz | Wong Wing-keung | 1:35.50 |
| 2006 | Russian Pearl | 5 | Gérald Mossé | Tony Cruz | M/M Kam Shing Kan | 1:35.10 |
| 2007 | Armada | 5 | Douglas Whyte | John Size | Wong Yuk Lun | 1:34.10 |
| 2008 | Good Ba Ba | 6 | Olivier Doleuze | Andreas Schutz | John Yuen Se Kit | 1:34.30 |
| 2009 | Good Ba Ba | 7 | Christophe Soumillon | Andreas Schutz | John Yuen Se Kit | 1:33.29 |
| 2010 | Fellowship | 7 | Zac Purton | Paul O'Sullivan | David Sin Wai Kin | 1:33.96 |
| 2011 | Beauty Flash | 5 | Gérald Mossé | Tony Cruz | Simon Kwok Siu Ming | 1:34.92 |
| 2012 | Ambitious Dragon | 5 | Douglas Whyte | Tony Millard | Johnson Lam Pui Hung & Anderson Lam Him Yue | 1:34.93 |
| 2013 | Glorious Days | 5 | Douglas Whyte | John Size | Tom Brown's Syndicate | 1:33.75 |
| 2014 | Blazing Speed | 5 | Mirco Demuro | Tony Cruz | Fentons Racing Syndicate | 1:33.91 |
| 2015 | Able Friend | 5 | João Moreira | John Moore | Dr & Mrs Cornel Li Fook Kwan | 1:33.50 |
| 2016 | Giant Treasure | 5 | Christophe Soumillon | Richard Gibson | Mr Pan Sotong | 1:34.16 |
| 2017 | Helene Paragon | 5 | Tommy Berry | John Moore | Sir Po-shing & Lady Woo et al. | 1:34.38 |
| 2018 | Seasons Bloom | 5 | João Moreira | Danny Shum Chap-shing | Paul Lo Chung Wai & Kathy Lo Ho Hsiu Lan | 1:34.74 |
| 2019 | Beauty Generation | 6 | Zac Purton | John Moore | Patrick Kwok Ho Chuen | 1:33.51 |
| 2020 | Waikuku | 5 | João Moreira | John Size | Jocelyn Siu Yang Hin Ting | 1:33.04 |
| 2021 | Golden Sixty | 5 | Vincent Ho Chak-yiu | Francis Lui Kin-wai | Stanley Chan Ka Leung | 1:33.35 |
| 2022 | Waikuku | 7 | Zac Purton | John Size | Jocelyn Siu Yang Hin Ting | 1:34.82 |
| 2023 | Golden Sixty | 7 | Vincent Ho Chak-yiu | Francis Lui Kin-wai | Stanley Chan Ka Leung | 1:33.99 |
| 2024 | Voyage Bubble | 5 | James McDonald | Ricky Yiu Poon-fai | Sunshine And Moonlight Syndicate | 1:33.97 |
| 2025 | Voyage Bubble | 6 | James McDonald | Ricky Yiu Poon-fai | Sunshine And Moonlight Syndicate | 1:33.58 |
| 2026 | Romantic Warrior | 8 | James McDonald | Danny Shum Chap-shing | Peter Lau Pak Fai | 1:32.60 |

== See also ==
- List of Hong Kong horse races
