= Silent Witness (horse) =

Australian-bred Thoroughbred racehorse

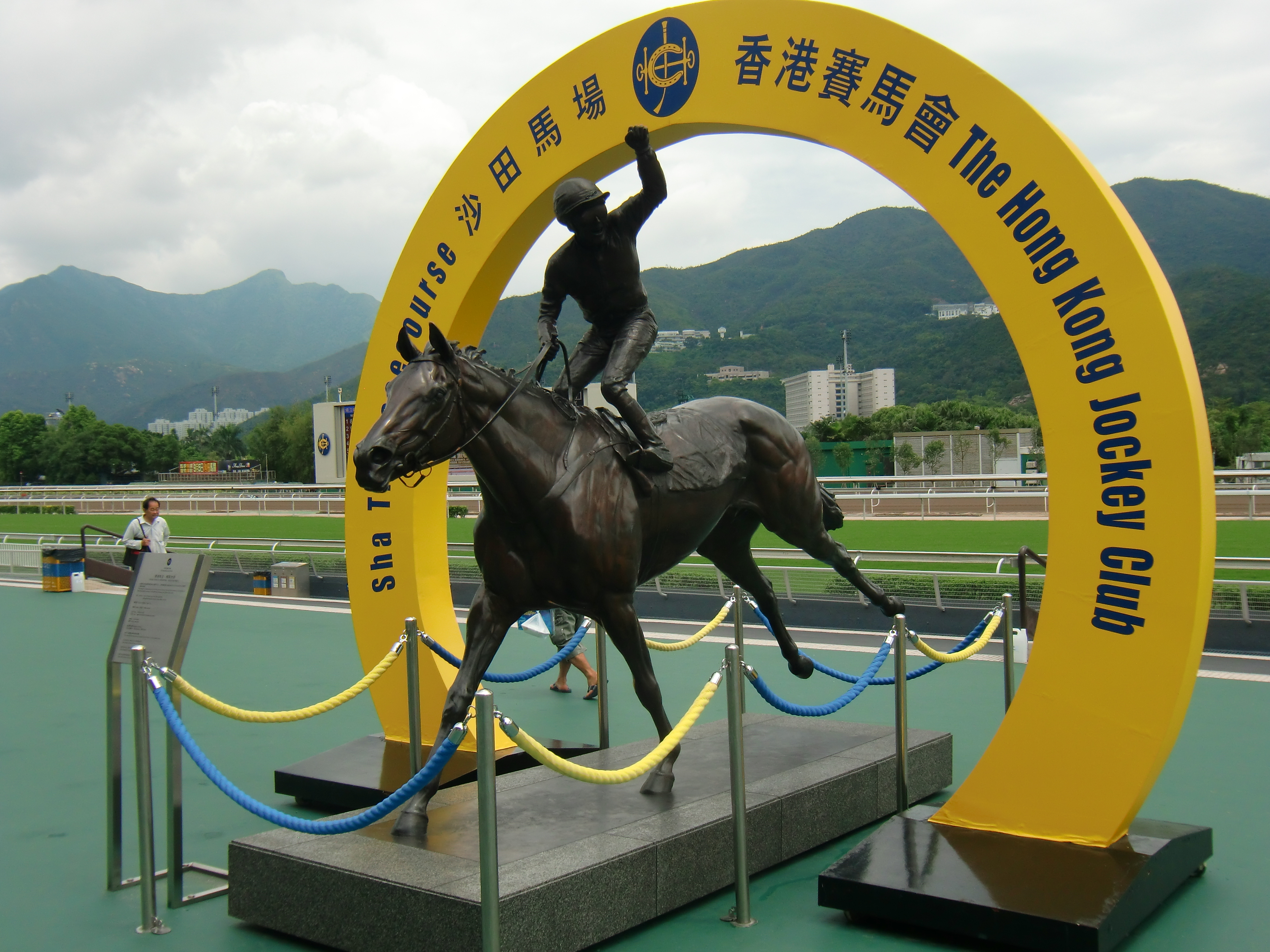
- Statue of Silent Witness
- Sire: El Moxie (USA)
- Grandsire: Conquistador Cielo
- Dam: Jade Tiara
- Damsire: Bureaucracy (NZ)
- Sex: Gelding
- Foaled: October 1999
- Country: Australia
- Colour: Bay
- Breeder: Mr I. K. Smith
- Owner: Arthur Antonio da Silva
- Trainer: Tony Cruz
- Record: 29: 18-3-2
- Earnings: HKD$62,496,396 (USD$8 million)

Major wins
- 2003 & 2004 Hong Kong Sprint; 2003 & 2004 International Sprint Trial; 2004 HK Bauhinia Sprint Trophy; 2004 HK Centenary Sprint Cup; 2004 HK Chairman's Sprint Prize; 2005 Sprinters Stakes

Awards
- Hong Kong Champion Sprinter (2004, 2005, 2006); Hong Kong Horse of the Year (2004 & 2005); Hong Kong Most Popular Horse of the Year (2004, 2005); World's Champion Sprinter (2003, 2004, 2005)
- Last updated on 16 September 2010

Silent Witness (Chinese: 精英大師) (foaled 1 October 1999) is a retired Thoroughbred racehorse who won his first 17 starts in sprint races in Hong Kong. He was ranked the world's top sprinter for three seasons.

He was bred by I. K. Smith and foaled in 1999 at Edinburgh Park Stud near Taree, New South Wales in Australia. Silent Witness is by El Moxie (USA) out of Jade Tiara by Bureaucracy (NZ). Jade Tiara is the dam of nine named horses.

== Racing record ==
Silent Witness was trained by Tony Cruz, ridden by Felix Coetzee and owned by Mr. and Mrs. Arthur Antonio da Silva.

He made his debut as a three-year-old at the Sha Tin racecourse in a 1,000-metre race in Hong Kong. Silent Witness won this race by a margin of almost four lengths in the fast time of 57.8 seconds.

Silent Witness was awarded the title of Most Improved Horse and Champion Griffin (inexperienced racehorse) in the Hong Kong Jockey Club awards presentation ceremony in June 2003.

In 2003 and 2004 Silent Witness won the internationally contested Hong Kong Sprint race by defeating top horses from Europe, Japan, Australia, and the United States. In the Centenary Sprint Cup (G1), Silent Witness equalled the long-standing Hong Kong record of ten consecutive wins. He also won six other major Group One (G1) Sprints in 2004 and 2005.

After the 17 consecutive wins, he attempted the mile race in the Champions Mile in May 2005 at Sha Tin Racecourse but he was defeated by Bullish Luck by a short head.

He made a second attempt on the mile by going to Tokyo, Japan to participate in the Yasuda Kinen in June. Again, he ran well but was defeated by Asakusa Den'en, a Japanese horse, near the winning post.

A mile was the maximum distance that he could race and win. On 2 October 2005, he took part in the Sprinters Stakes, which is a Group 1 Sprint Race in Japan over 1,200 metres. Silent Witness won the race easily by 1¼ lengths with a time of 1:07.3 seconds, 0.3 seconds slower than the track record time.

For the three years from 2003 to 2005, the International Federation of Horseracing Authorities in Paris ranked Silent Witness the world's fastest sprinter.

The Hong Kong Jockey Club made a website for him, making him the first horse with its own website in Hong Kong. The Jockey Club also sells gifts for him. On 24 April 2005, the day Silent Witness won his 17th consecutive race, the Jockey Club gave memorial caps to people, which led to a trampling incident.

Silent Witness is sometimes compared to another Hong Kong champion, Co-Tack, and the American horse Cigar who won 16 consecutive races.

Silent Witness was retired, after his last race on the Sha Tin Racecourse on 4 February 2007. He is now at Living Legends, the International Home of Rest for Champion Horses located in Woodlands Historic Park, Greenvale, Victoria, Australia.

== Pedigree ==
Pedigree of Silent Witness (AUS), b.g. 1999
Sire El Moxie (USA) B. 1986	Conquistador Cielo; B. 1979	Mr. Prospector	Raise a Native
Sire El Moxie (USA) B. 1986	Conquistador Cielo; B. 1979	Mr. Prospector	Gold Digger
Sire El Moxie (USA) B. 1986	Conquistador Cielo; B. 1979	K.D. Princess	Bold Commander
Sire El Moxie (USA) B. 1986	Conquistador Cielo; B. 1979	K.D. Princess	Tammy's Turn
Sire El Moxie (USA) B. 1986	Raise the Standard (CAN); B. 1978	Hoist The Flag (USA)	Tom Rolfe
Sire El Moxie (USA) B. 1986	Raise the Standard (CAN); B. 1978	Hoist The Flag (USA)	Wavy Navy
Sire El Moxie (USA) B. 1986	Raise the Standard (CAN); B. 1978	Natalma (USA)	Native Dancer
Sire El Moxie (USA) B. 1986	Raise the Standard (CAN); B. 1978	Natalma (USA)	Almahmoud
Dam Jade Tiara B. 1993	Bureaucracy (NZ); Br. 1987	Lord Ballina (AUS)	Bletchingly (AUS)
Dam Jade Tiara B. 1993	Bureaucracy (NZ); Br. 1987	Lord Ballina (AUS)	Sunset Girl (AUS)
Dam Jade Tiara B. 1993	Bureaucracy (NZ); Br. 1987	Tulla Doll	Oncidium (GB)
Dam Jade Tiara B. 1993	Bureaucracy (NZ); Br. 1987	Tulla Doll	Doll
Dam Jade Tiara B. 1993	Jade-Amanda (NZ); Ch. 1986	Grosvenor	Sir Tristram (IRE)
Dam Jade Tiara B. 1993	Jade-Amanda (NZ); Ch. 1986	Grosvenor	My Tricia
Dam Jade Tiara B. 1993	Jade-Amanda (NZ); Ch. 1986	Comptroller	Smuggler (GB)
Dam Jade Tiara B. 1993	Jade-Amanda (NZ); Ch. 1986	Comptroller	Shifnal's Pride (family: 13a)

== See also ==
- List of leading Thoroughbred racehorses
