= Fairy King Prawn =

Australian-bred Thoroughbred racehorse

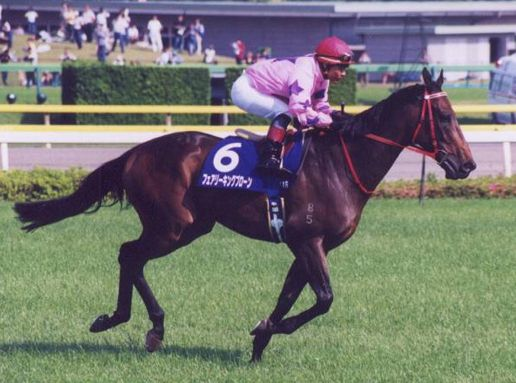
- Sire: Danehill
- Grandsire: Danzig
- Dam: Twiglet
- Damsire: Twig Moss
- Sex: Gelding
- Foaled: 13 October 1995
- Country: Australia
- Colour: Bay
- Breeder: Catherine Redmond
- Owner: Lau Sak Hong
- Trainer: Ricky P. F. Yiu; Ivan Allan
- Record: 26: 12-10-0

Major wins
- Chairman's Sprint Prize (1999, 2001); Hong Kong Sprint (1999); Yasuda Kinen (2000); Happy Valley Trophy (2000); Hong Kong Stewards' Cup (2001); Bauhinia Sprint Trophy (2001)

Awards
- Hong Kong Horse of the Year (2000, 2001); Hong Kong Most Popular Horse of the Year (2000, 2001, 2002); Hong Kong Champion Sprinter (2001); Hong Kong Champion Miler (2001)

Fairy King Prawn (Chinese 靚蝦王: foaled 13 October 1995) was an Australian-bred, Hong Kong-trained Thoroughbred racehorse. After being sold and exported to Hong Kong as a yearling he became one of the most successful and popular horses in his adopted territory. Equally adept as a sprinter or as a miler he won twelve of his twenty-six starts including the Chairman's Sprint Prize (twice) the Hong Kong Sprint, Hong Kong Stewards' Cup and Bauhinia Sprint Trophy. In 2000 he became the first Hong Kong horse to win a Grade One race abroad when he won the Yasuda Kinen in Japan. He won numerous awards including the title of Hong Kong Horse of the Year on two occasions. He was retired from racing in 2002 after undergoing surgery for serious leg injuries. After working for several years at a Hong Kong riding school he was sent into full retirement in New Zealand in 2011.

== Background ==
Fairy King Prawn is a bay gelding bred in Australia by Catherine Redmond. His sire Danehill (who died in 2003) was a highly successful breeding stallion, producing the winners of more than a thousand races, including one hundred and fifty-six at Group One/Grade I level. Among his best offspring are Duke of Marmalade, Dylan Thomas, Rock of Gibraltar, George Washington and North Light. Fairy King Prawn's dam Twiglet was a high-class Australian racehorse who won the Edward Manifold Stakes in 1990 and went on to be a successful broodmare, also producing the Salinger Stakes winner Easy Rocking. She was a descendant of Three Rock, whose other descendants included the Haydock Sprint Cup winner Green God.

As a yearling, Fairy King Prawn was consigned to the Inglis Easter Sale and was bought for $180,000 by representatives of the Hong Kong businessman Philip Lau Sak Hong. In the early part of his racing career, the gelding was trained by Ricky P. F. Yiu.

== Racing career ==
=== 1997/1998: two-year-old season ===
On his only appearance of the 1997/1998 season, Fairy King Prawn won the Starlight Plate over 1000 metres at Sha Tin Racecourse on 28 March.

=== 1998/1999: three-year-old season ===
Fairy King Prawn began his second season with a win in a 1200-metre handicap race in September before finishing sixth in a similar event a month later and second in a race for three-year-olds over 1400 metres in November. He then won a handicap on 13 December and returned in February 1999 to record his biggest win thus far in the TVB Cup, beating the five-year-old Bumper Storm by two and three quarter lengths. After running second to Electronic Zone in the Hong Kong Telecom Cup Fairy King Prawn was moved up in class for the Chairman's Sprint Prize over 1200 metres on 8 May. Ridden by Steven King, he won by a neck from the Queen Elizabeth II Cup winner Oriental Express. On his final appearance of the season, Fairy King Prawn finished second to the New Zealand-bred Kingston Treasure in the Sha Tin Vase.

=== 1999/2000: four-year-old season ===
On his debut as a four-year-old, Fairy King Prawn finished seventh when carrying a weight of 135 pounds in a 1200-metre handicap on 5 September and then finished second to Best of the Best when dropped in distance for the Panasonic Cup over 1000 metres in November. On 12 December, Fairy King Prawn contested the inaugural running of the Hong Kong Sprint in which he faced an international field including Big Jag (winner of the San Carlos Handicap) from the United States, Nuclear Debate and Sainte Marine (Prix du Gros Chêne) from France, Proud Native (Ballyogan Stakes) and Tedburrow (Flying Five Stakes) from Britain, Dantelah (Oakleigh Plate) from Australia. Steven King settled the gelding in mid-division before making a forward move in the straight. Fairy King Prawn took the lead inside the last 200 metres and won by a length from Crystal Charm with Big Jag in third ahead of Dantelah.

In January Fairy King Prawn started favourite for the Bauhinia Sprint Trophy over 1000 metres but was beaten one and a quarter lengths by the 33/1 outsider Holy Grail. The gelding finished runner-up again in his next two races, finishing second to Best of the Best in the Centenary Sprint Cup in March. He was then transferred to the stable of Ivan Allan, with Robbie Fradd taking over from Steven King as his jockey. On his first appearance for his new stable he was beaten a neck by Tajasur when attempting to repeat his 1999 success in the Chairman's Prize. On his final appearance of the season, Fairy King Prawn attempted to become the first Hong Kong-trained racehorse to win a Group/ Grade I race abroad when he was sent to Japan to contest the Yasuda Kinen over 1600 metres at Tokyo Racecourse on 4 June. The Godolphin stable, which had won the race five years earlier with Heart Lake was represented by Diktat, a five-year-old who had won the Prix Maurice de Gheest in France and the Haydock Sprint Cup in England. The locally trained runners included Eagle Cafe (NHK Mile Cup), Black Hawk (Sprinters Stakes), Umeno Fiber (Yushun Himba) and King Halo (Takamatsunomiya Kinen). Fairy King Prawn raced well behind the leaders before moving out to the far outside in the straight. He took the lead 100 metres from the finish and won the race by one and a quarter lengths from Diktat, with King Halo the best of the Japanese runners in third place.

=== 2000/2001: five-year-old season ===
Fairy King Prawn began his five-year-old season in October at Happy Valley Racecourse where he carried 135 pounds to victory in the Happy Valley Handicap and then finished second by a short head to King of Danes in the Sprint Trial Trophy at Sha Tin in November, conceding twenty-two pounds to the winner. Rather than attempting to repeat his previous success in the Hong Kong Sprint, Fairy King Prawn was moved up in distance to contest the Hong Kong Mile on 17 December. Starting the 4.3/1 second favourite he was towards the rear of the fourteen-runner field for most of the way before making rapid progress in the straight but failed by a short head to catch the New Zealand mare Sunline, with the pair finishing four and a half lengths clear of the other runners.

On 14 January Fairy King Prawn started 3/5 favourite ahead of the four-year-old Electronic Unicorn for the Hong Kong Stewards' Cup (the first leg of the Hong Kong Triple Crown) over 1600 metres. He came from well off the pace to accelerate clear of the field in the last 200 metres and won easily by one and a half lengths from the 25/1 outsider Magnifier with Electronic Unicorn in third place. Twelve days later the gelding was dropped in distance for his second attempt at the Bauhinia Sprint Trophy and started 6/5 favourite in a field of fourteen runners which included King of Danes and Best of the Best. Ridden by Fradd, he took the lead 300 metres from the finish and won by three-quarters of a length and two lengths from Kenwood Melody and Trinculo. After the race, the South China Morning Post's senior racing writer Lawrence Wadey wrote: "The Prawn is racing's Tiger Woods, soccer's Rivaldo, Zinedine and David Beckham all rolled into one; he is this sport's Michael Schumacher and Lennox Lewis. In the context of Hong Kong, he's a sporting colossus." On 3 March he started favourite for the Hong Kong Gold Cup (the second leg of the Triple Crown) despite racing for the first time over 2000 metres. After being towards the rear as usual in the early stages he moved forward in the straight but finished sixth of the twelve runners, two and a quarter lengths behind the winner Idol.

Fairy King Prawn raced overseas for the second time when he was sent to the United Arab Emirates to contest the Dubai Duty Free over 1800 metres at Nad Al Sheba Racecourse on 24 March. He started 5/1 joint second favourite behind Sunline, and alongside the French gelding Jim And Tonic. After being restrained by Fradd in the early stages, Fairy King Prawn made a strong run on the outside in the straight to overtake Sunline 150 metres from the finish but was caught in the final strides and beaten a neck by Jim And Tonic. Four weeks later, Fairy King Prawn returned to Hong Kong and won the Chairman's Prize for the second time, beating Trinculo by four lengths when ridden for the first time by Weichong Marwing. In June he attempted to repeat his 2000 success in the Yasuda Kinen but finished ninth of the eighteen runners behind Black Hawk. His participation in the race had been in doubt owing to restrictions imposed as a result of the 2001 foot-and-mouth outbreak.

=== 2001/2002: six-year-old season ===
Fairy King Prawn's only appearance in his final season came on 1 October in the National Day Cup over 1400 metres in which he was required to concede at least twelve pounds to each of his thirteen opponents. Ridden again by Marwing he won the race by two lengths from Meridian Star, with Oriental Express, Crystal Charm and Best of the Best among the unplaced runners. In January 2002, the gelding underwent surgery which entailed the removal of a portion of a fractured splint bone and an injection to a strained ligament.

== Awards and assessment ==
Fairy King Prawn was named Hong Kong Horse of the Year and Hong Kong Most Popular Horse of the Year in both 2000 and 2001 before taking a third "Most Popular" award in 2002. In 2001 he had been named Hong Kong Champion Sprinter and Hong Kong Champion Miler.

== Retirement ==
Fairy King Prawn was officially retired from racing in February 2003. He spent several years at Tuen Mun Public Riding School, providing experience for new riders. In 2011 the horse was sent to New Zealand to provide what Lau called "a bigger and more comfy place for the old racehorse to live happily and healthily."

== Pedigree ==
Pedigree of Fairy King Prawn (AUS), bay gelding, 1995
Sire Danehill (USA) 1986	Danzig (USA); 1977	Northern Dancer	Nearctic
Sire Danehill (USA) 1986	Danzig (USA); 1977	Northern Dancer	Natalma*
Sire Danehill (USA) 1986	Danzig (USA); 1977	Pas de Nom	Admiral's Voyage
Sire Danehill (USA) 1986	Danzig (USA); 1977	Pas de Nom	Petitioner
Sire Danehill (USA) 1986	Razyana (USA); 1981	His Majesty	Ribot
Sire Danehill (USA) 1986	Razyana (USA); 1981	His Majesty	Flower Bowl
Sire Danehill (USA) 1986	Razyana (USA); 1981	Spring Adieu	Buckpasser
Sire Danehill (USA) 1986	Razyana (USA); 1981	Spring Adieu	Natalma*
Dam Twiglet (AUS) 1987	Twig Moss (FR); 1973	Luthier	Klairon
Dam Twiglet (AUS) 1987	Twig Moss (FR); 1973	Luthier	Flute Enchantee
Dam Twiglet (AUS) 1987	Twig Moss (FR); 1973	Top Twig	High Perch
Dam Twiglet (AUS) 1987	Twig Moss (FR); 1973	Top Twig	Kimpton Wood
Dam Twiglet (AUS) 1987	Extradite (AUS); 1982	Bletchingly	Biscay
Dam Twiglet (AUS) 1987	Extradite (AUS); 1982	Bletchingly	Coogee
Dam Twiglet (AUS) 1987	Extradite (AUS); 1982	Expulsion	Infatuation
Dam Twiglet (AUS) 1987	Extradite (AUS); 1982	Expulsion	Roedean (Family: 22)

- Like all of Danehill's offspring Fairy King Prawn is inbred 4 × 4 to the mare Natalma. This means that she occurs twice in the fourth generation of his pedigree.
