= Asian Mile Challenge =

Series of horse races in Asia and the Pacific

The Asian Mile Challenge is a series of four one-mile (eight furlongs) Thoroughbred horse races. Created in 2005, the series was launched with two races, one in Hong Kong, the other in Japan. In 2006, a race each at the Melbourne Racing Club of Australia and the Dubai Racing Club of the United Arab Emirates joined the series.

Raced approximately four weeks apart between March and June, a US$1 million bonus is given to any horse who wins two legs of the Asian Mile Challenge. In 2006, the Hong Kong–based horse Bullish Luck collected the bonus after winning the Champions Mile and the Yasuda Kinen.

The Asian Mile Challenge now consists of four Grade I races:

1. Futurity Stakes at Caulfield Racecourse, Melbourne
2. Dubai Duty Free Stakes at Meydan Racecourse in Dubai
3. Champions Mile at Sha Tin Racecourse, Hong Kong
4. Yasuda Kinen at Tokyo Racecourse, Tokyo
