= Glorious Days =

Australian-bred racehorse

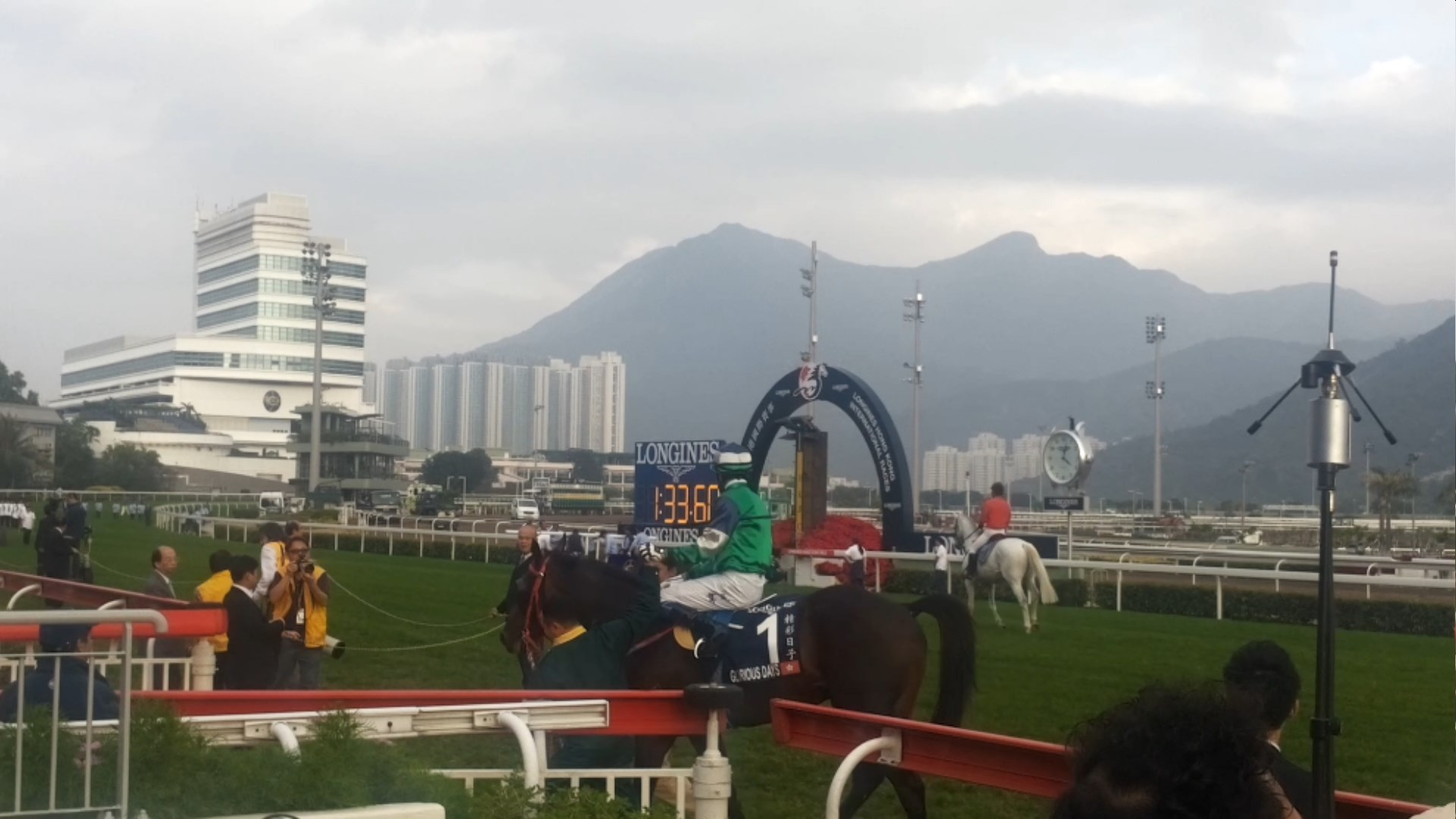
- Sire: Hussonet
- Dam: San Century
- Damsire: Centaine
- Sex: Gelding
- Foaled: 30 September 2007
- Country: Australia
- Colour: Brown
- Owner: Tom Brown's Syndicate
- Trainer: Stephen McKee (New Zealand); John Size (Hong Kong)
- Record: 22: 7-5-1
- Earnings: HK$ 33,455,000

Major wins
- Jockey Club Mile (2012); Hong Kong Stewards' Cup (2013); Hong Kong Mile (2013)
- Last updated on May 8, 2015

Glorious Days (Chinese: 精彩日子) is an Australian-bred Thoroughbred racehorse formerly based in Hong Kong. In the season of 2013–2014, he won the Hong Kong Mile. It was his first international Group One win.

In 2015, Glorious Days was retired after misbehaving and unseating his rider at Kempton racecourse.
