= Sacred Kingdom =

Australian-bred Thoroughbred racehorse

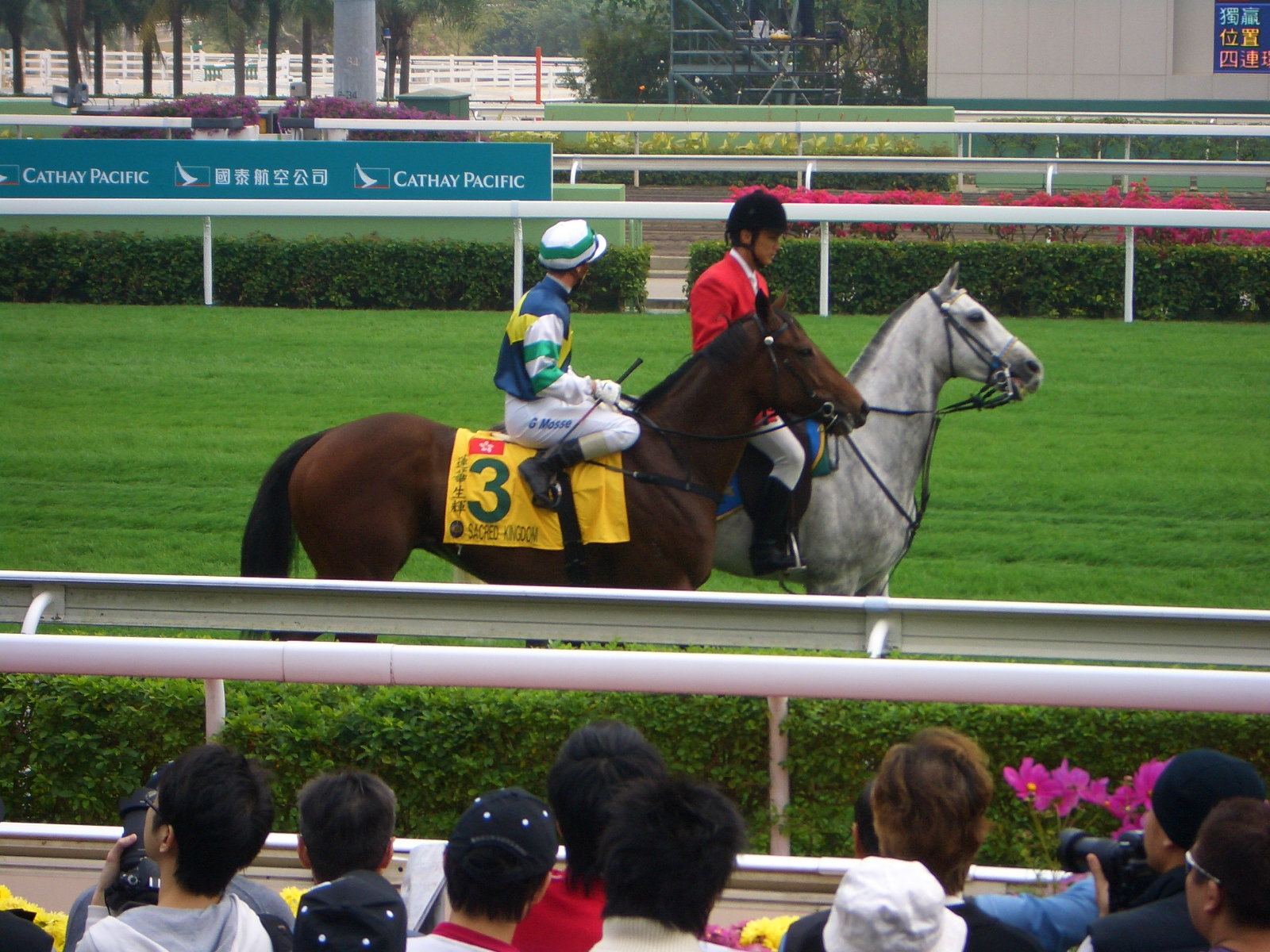
- Sire: Encosta De Lago
- Grandsire: Fairy King (USA)
- Dam: Countroom Sweetie
- Damsire: Zeditave
- Sex: Gelding
- Foaled: 18 November 2003
- Country: Australia
- Colour: Bay
- Breeder: N.F. Calvert, Est Late A.M. Calvert, Vic
- Owner: Sin Kang Yuk
- Trainer: Ricky P. F. Yiu
- Record: 36: 17-7-2
- Earnings: HKD$45,831,144

Major wins
- Hong Kong Sprint (2007, 2009); Chairman's Sprint Prize (2008, 2010); KrisFlyer International Sprint (2009)

Awards
- Hong Kong Champion Sprinter (2008, 2009, 2010, 2011); Hong Kong Most Popular Horse of the Year (2009, 2010); Hong Kong Horse of the Year (2009-10)
- Last updated on 18 March 2011

Sacred Kingdom (Chinese: 蓮華生輝), (foaled 18 November 2003 in Australia on Kornong Stud) is a Thoroughbred racehorse trained in Hong Kong. His group one success came in the Hong Kong Sprint. His retirement was announced in April 2012.

In Australia he was known as Jumbo Star.
