= Hong Kong Champion Sprinter =

The Hong Kong Champion Sprinter is an honour given in Hong Kong thoroughbred horse racing. It is awarded annually by the Hong Kong Jockey Club (HKJC). The honour is part of the Hong Kong Jockey Club Champion Awards and is awarded at the end of the Hong Kong season in July.

== Winners since 2001 ==
Year	Horse	Age	Bred	Trainer	Owner
2000/2001	Fairy King Prawn	5	Australia	Ivan Allan	Lau Sak Hong
2001/2002	Charming City	6	Australia	David A. Hayes	C S Ling
2002/2003	Grand Delight	6	Australia	John Size	Peter Law Kin Sang
2003/2004	Silent Witness	4	Australia	Anthony S. Cruz	Arthur Antonio da Silva
2004/2005	Silent Witness	5	Australia	Anthony S. Cruz	Arthur Antonio da Silva
2005/2006	Silent Witness	6	Australia	Anthony S. Cruz	Arthur Antonio da Silva
2006/2007	Absolute Champion	6	Australia	David Hall	Eddie Wong Ming Chak
2007/2008	Sacred Kingdom	4	Australia	Ricky P. F. Yiu	Sin Kang Yuk
2008/2009	Sacred Kingdom	5	Australia	Ricky P. F. Yiu	Sin Kang Yuk
2009/2010	Sacred Kingdom	6	Australia	Ricky P. F. Yiu	Sin Kang Yuk
2010/2011	Sacred Kingdom	7	Australia	Ricky P. F. Yiu	Sin Kang Yuk
2011/2012	Little Bridge	6	New Zealand	C S Shum	Ko Kam Piu
2012/2013	Lucky Nine	6	Ireland	Caspar Fownes	Chang Fuk To
2013/2014	Lucky Nine	7	Ireland	Caspar Fownes	Chang Fuk To
2014/2015	Aerovelocity	6	New Zealand	Paul O’Sullivan	Daniel Yeung Ngai
2015/2016	Peniaphobia	5	Ireland	Anthony S. Cruz	Huang Kai Wen
2016/2017	Aerovelocity	8	New Zealand	Paul O’Sullivan	Daniel Yeung Ngai
2017/2018	Ivictory	4	Australia	John Size	Michael T H Lee & Henry Chan Hin Lee
2018/2019	Beat the Clock	5	Australia	John Size	Merrick Chung Wai Lik
2019/2020	Beat the Clock	6	Australia	John Size	Merrick Chung Wai Lik
2020/2021	Hot King Prawn	6	Australia	John Size	Lau Sak Hong
2021/2022	Wellington	5	Australia	Richard Gibson	Mr & Mrs Michael Cheng Wing On and Jeffrey Cheng Man Cheong
2022/2023	Lucky Sweynesse	4	New Zealand	Manfred Man	Cheng Ming Leung, Cheng Yu Tung, Cheng Mei Mei & Cheng Yu Wai
2023/2024	California Spangle	6	Ireland	Tony Cruz	The Executors of the Estate of the late Howard Liang Yum Shing
2024/2025	Ka Ying Rising	4	New Zealand	David Hayes	Ka Ying Syndicate
