= Robbie Fradd =

South African jockey

Personal information
- Born: 4 December 1964 (age 61) South Africa
- Occupation: Jockey

Horse racing career
- Sport: Horse racing
- Career wins: Not found

Major racing wins
- Durban July Handicap (1994, 2003); Yasuda Kinen (2000); Hong Kong Derby (2000); Hong Kong Champions & Chater Cup (2000); Hong Kong Stewards' Cup (2001, 2002, 2003); Singapore Derby (2006); Kranji Mile (2007)

Racing awards
- Hong Kong Champion Jockey (1999/2000)

Significant horses
- Housemaster, Fairy King Prawn, Electronic Unicorn

Robbie Fradd (born 4 December 1964 in South Africa) is a jockey in Thoroughbred horse racing.

Robbie Fradd, has ridden in his native South Africa and in Mauritius, Australia, New Zealand, Dubai, Japan, Singapore and Hong Kong. He was the champion jockey and second-placed rider for the 1999–2000 and 2000–2001 Hong Kong racing seasons respectively.

Fradd relocated his family to Australia in 2014 for lifestyle reasons, settling on the Gold Coast and obtaining a license to ride. He currently rides primarily in southern Queensland.
