= Bullish Luck =

American-bred Thoroughbred racehorse

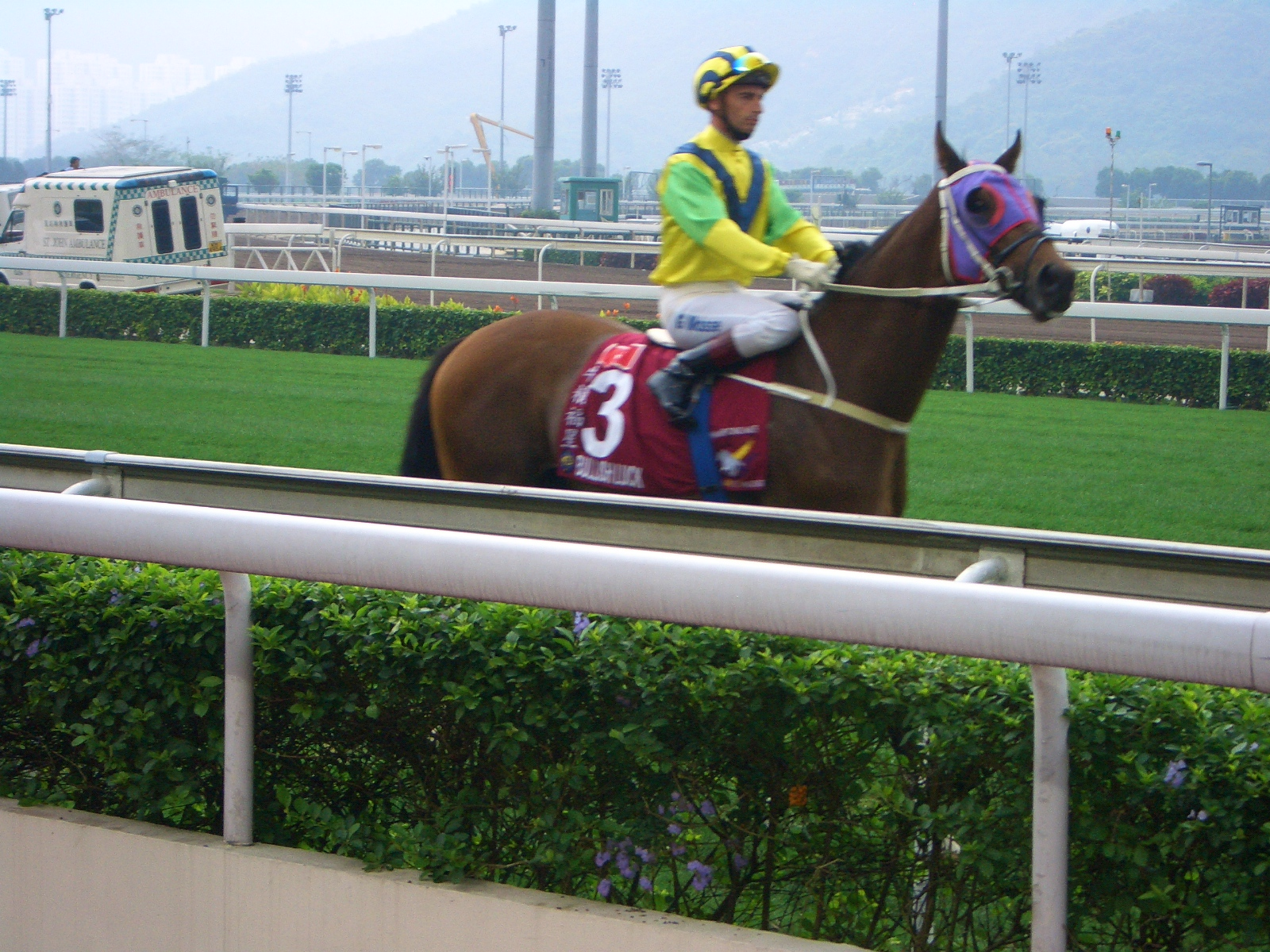
- Bullish Luck on 2008 Champions Mile
- Sire: Royal Academy
- Grandsire: Nijinsky
- Dam: Wild Vintage
- Damsire: Alysheba
- Sex: Gelding
- Foaled: 1999
- Country: United States
- Colour: Bay
- Breeder: Max Morris & Isabel Morris
- Owner: Wong Wing-keung
- Trainer: Tony Cruz
- Record: 54: 11-7-7
- Earnings: HKD$63,045,680

Major wins
- Hong Kong Gold Cup (2004); Stewards' Cup (2005); Champions Mile (2005 & 2006); Yasuda Kinen (2006)

Awards
- Hong Kong Champion Miler (2005 & 2006); Hong Kong Horse of the Year (2006); Hong Kong Most Popular Horse of the Year (2006)
- Last updated on June 10, 2007

Bullish Luck (Chinese: 牛精福星) (foaled: 1999) is a Hong Kong–based Thoroughbred racehorse. Bred in Kentucky, he is the son of the 1990 Breeders' Cup Mile winner Royal Academy and out of the Alysheba mare Wild Vintage. He was sold by his breeders at the Tattersalls October Yearling Sale to Gordon Smyth who named him "Al Moughazel" and sent him to Newmarket for training under Pip Payne.

Sold to Wong Wing-keung of Hong Kong, his name was changed to Bullish Luck. In his first few years of racing, the colt met with only modest success. However, at age five he began to demonstrate real promise, winning the Group I 2004 Hong Kong Gold Cup and finishing second to Alexander Goldrun in December's Hong Kong Cup. In 2005 Bullish Luck won the Champions Mile at Sha Tin Racecourse and in the process put an end to the seventeen-race winning streak of stablemate Silent Witness. His performances in 2005 earned him the Hong Kong Champion Miler title.

In 2006, Bullish Luck won his second Champions Mile, a part of the Asian Mile Challenge, and after finishing fourth in the 2005 Yasuda Kinen, he captured the 2006 race to earn the $1 million bonus given to any horse who wins two legs of the four-race Asian Mile Challenge.

For his performances, Bullish Luck earned his second Hong Kong Champion Miler title in 2006, and was voted Hong Kong Horse of the Year.

On March 31, 2007, in the Dubai World Cup at Nad Al Sheba Racecourse, Bullish Luck raced for the first time on dirt, finishing third behind Invasor.

Bullish Luck is now retired in Victoria, Australia. He resides at Living Legends: The International Home Of Rest For Champion Horses, alongside his stablemate from Hong Kong Silent Witness.
