= Alex H W Lai =

Hong Kong jockey

Alex H W Lai is a horse racing jockey, who completed his apprenticeship in December 2007. He was a champion apprentice for two seasons when he was indentured to the stable of Peter Ho. He rode 31 winners in Hong Kong in 2010/11 for a career total of 185. In 2013/14, he rode 18 winners in Hong Kong for a career total of 236.

== Major wins ==
- HKG3 Queen Mother Memorial Cup - Mr Medici (2009)
- HKG2 Sprint Cup - Ultra Fantasy (2009)
- G1 Sprinters' Stakes at Nakayama - Ultra Fantasy (2010)

== Performance ==
Seasons	Total Rides	No. of Wins	No. of 2nds	No. of 3rds	No. of 4ths	Stakes won
2010/2011	488	31	35	36	37	HK$25,919,425
