= Hong Kong Champion Miler =

Award in Hong Kong thoroughbred horse racing

The Hong Kong Champion Miler is an honour given in Hong Kong thoroughbred horse racing. It is awarded annually by the Hong Kong Jockey Club (HKJC). The honour is part of the Hong Kong Jockey Club Champion Awards and is awarded at the end of the Hong Kong season in July.

== Winners since 2001 ==
Year	Horse	Age	Bred	Trainer	Owner
2000/2001	Fairy King Prawn	5	Australia	Ivan Allan	Lau Sak Hong
2001/2002	Electronic Unicorn	6	United States	John Size	Lo Ying Bin
2002/2003	Electronic Unicorn	7	United States	John Size	Lo Ying Bin
2003/2004	Lucky Owners	5	New Zealand	Anthony S. Cruz	Leung Kai Fai
2004/2005	Bullish Luck	6	United States	Anthony S. Cruz	Wong Wing-Keung
2005/2006	Bullish Luck	7	United States	Anthony S. Cruz	Wong Wing-Keung
2006/2007	Armada	6	New Zealand	John Size	Yuk Lun Wong
2007/2008	Good Ba Ba	6	United States	Michael Chang Chun Wai	John Yuen Se Kit
2008/2009	Good Ba Ba	7	United States	Michael Chang Chun Wai	John Yuen Se Kit
2009/2010	Able One	8	New Zealand	John Moore	Cornel Li Fook Kwan
2010/2011	Beauty Flash	6	New Zealand	Anthony S. Cruz	Kwok Siu Ming
2011/2012	Ambitious Dragon	5	New Zealand	A T Millard	Johnson Lam Pui Hung
2012/2013	Ambitious Dragon	6	New Zealand	A T Millard	Johnson Lam Pui Hung
2013/2014	Gold-Fun	5	Ireland	Richard Gibson	Pan Sutong
2014/2015	Able Friend	5	Australia	John Moore	Cornel Li Fook Kwan
2015/2016	Sun Jewellery	4	Australia	John Size	Tung Moon Fai
2016/2017	Beauty Only	5	Ireland	Anthony S. Cruz	Patrick Kwok Ho Chuen
2017/2018	Beauty Generation	5	New Zealand	Anthony S. Cruz	Patrick Kwok Ho Chuen
