= Tokyo Racecourse =

Horse racing venue in Tokyo, Japan

Tokyo Racecourse 東京競馬場
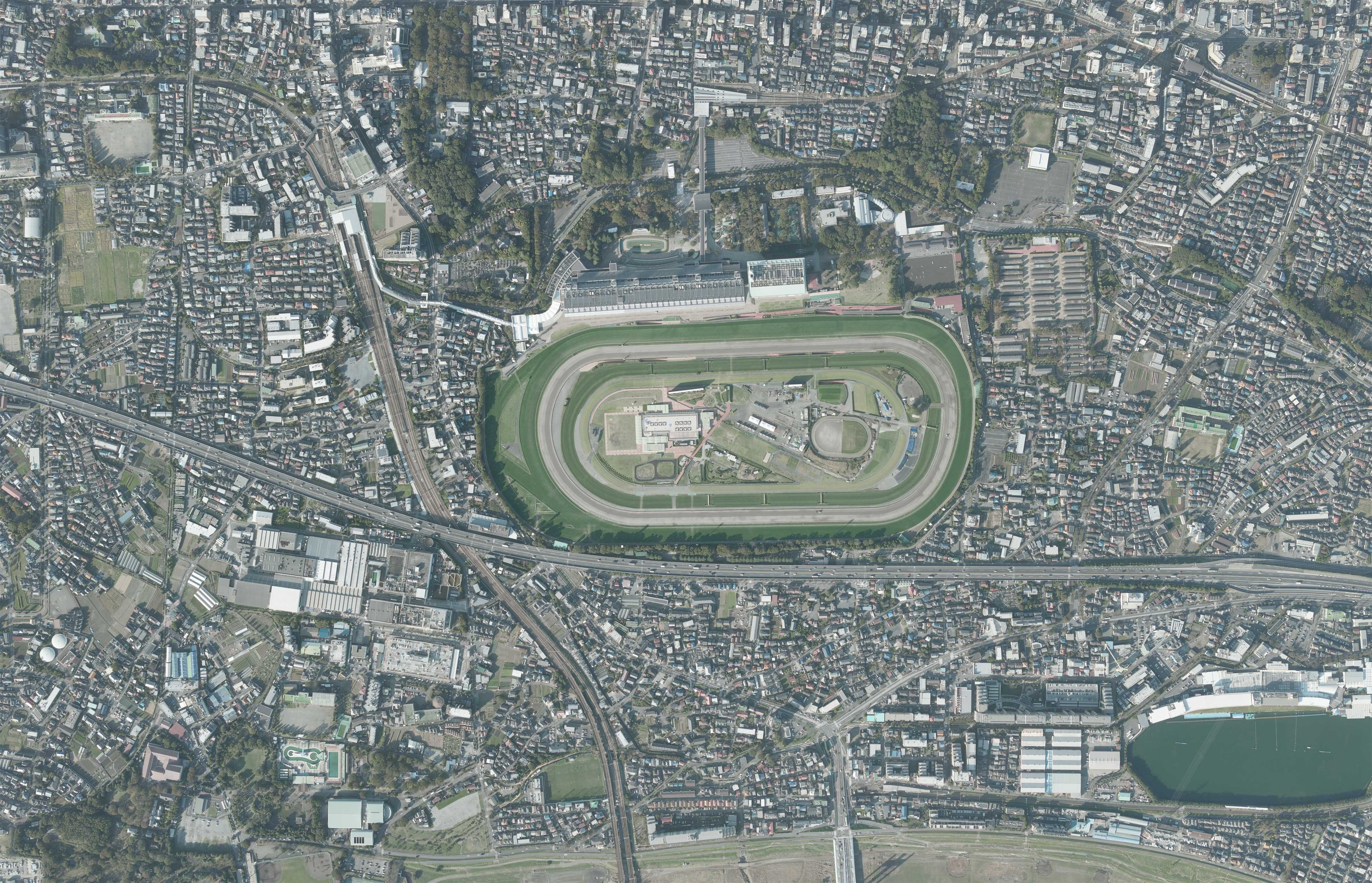
- Aerial Photo of the Tokyo Racecourse (2019)
- Interactive map of Tokyo Racecourse 東京競馬場
- Location: Fuchū, Tokyo, Japan
- Coordinates: 35°39′45″N 139°29′6″E
- Owned by: Japan Racing Association
- Date opened: November 8, 1933
- Course type: Flat, Steeplechase

Tokyo Racecourse (東京競馬場) is a Japanese horse racing course in Fuchū, Japan.

== Overview ==
Built in 1932 and officially opened in 1933, Tokyo Racecourse is widely regarded as the "racecourse of racecourses" in Japanese horseracing. Located in Fuchū, western Tokyo, it is easily accessible via public transport: a footbridge connects the venue directly to Fuchūkeiba-seimommae Station, (Note: Fuchūkeiba (Fuchu Racecourse) is another name derived from Fuchu City, where the Tokyo Racecourse is located.) while another links it to JR East’s Fuchūhommachi Station. With a total spectator capacity of 223,000, including 13,750 seats, the racecourse serves as the premier venue for Japan’s most prestigious flat races, including the Japan Cup, the Tokyo Yushun (Japanese Derby), and the Yasuda Kinen, a key event in the Asian Mile Challenge.

== History ==
=== Founding and early years ===
Tokyo Racecourse was constructed in 1932 on land in Fuchū, western Tokyo, and opened the following year under the Japan Racing Association (JRA)’s predecessor.

=== Post-war development and prestige ===
Following World War II, the racecourse underwent several upgrades, it became the permanent home of the Tokyo Yushun (first run in 1932) and later hosted the inaugural Japan Cup in 1981.

=== Modernization and renovation (2000–2007) ===
A redevelopment project, launched in 2000 and completed in 2007, transformed the venue into a state-of-the-art racing and entertainment complex. Among its key additions were the Fuji View Stand, the new main grandstand, which offers views of Mount Fuji on clear days, and the Memorial 60 Stand, erected to commemorate 60 years of the Japan Racing Association. The project also introduced what was then the world’s largest video screen, (66 meters by 11 meters), a record that stood until Kauffman Stadium surpassed it in 2009.

== Physical layout and courses ==
The racecourse features three distinct tracks:

- Turf Course: Measuring 2,083 meters (6,834 ft) in circumference, it includes two chutes for 1,800 m and 2,000 m starts. Races are run on one of five rail settings:
  - A Course (on the hedge)
  - B Course (rail out 3 m)
  - C Course (rail out 6 m)
  - D Course (rail out 9 m)
  - E Course (rail out 12 m)
- Dirt Course: 1,899 meters (6,230 ft) around, with a 1,600-meter (5,200 ft) chute for shorter races.
- Jump Course: A 1,675-meter (5,495 ft) course designed for steeplechase events.

Historically, a 3,200-meter chute was used for the Tenno Sho (Autumn), but it was decommissioned after the race distance was shortened to 2,000 meters and is no longer in use.

== Race timing protocol ==
Consistent with international standards, all races at Tokyo Racecourse employ a 5-meter gate run before official timing begins. This ensures accurate distance measurement from the moment horses pass the designated timing point.

== Notable races ==
| Month | Race | Distance | Age/Sex |
Grade I
| Feb. | February Stakes | Dirt 1600m | 4yo + |
| May | NHK Mile Cup | Turf 1600m | 3yo c&f |
| May | Victoria Mile | Turf 1600m | 4yo + f |
| May | Yushun Himba (Japanese Oaks) | Turf 2400m | 3yo f |
| May/Jun. | Tokyo Yushun (Japanese Derby) | Turf 2400m | 3yo c&f |
| Jun. | Yasuda Kinen | Turf 1600m | 3yo + |
| Oct./Nov. | Tennō Shō (Autumn) | Turf 2000m | 3yo + |
| Nov. | Japan Cup | Turf 2400m | 3yo + |
Grade II
| Apr. | Flora Stakes (Oaks Trial) | Turf 2000m | 3yo f |
| Apr./May | Aoba Sho (Derby Trial) | Turf 2400m | 3yo |
| May | Keio Hai Spring Cup (Yasuda Kinen Trial) | Turf 1400m | 4yo + |
| May/Jun. | Meguro Kinen (Handicap) | Turf 2500m | 3yo + |
| Oct. | Ireland Trophy (Queen Elizabeth II Cup trial) | Turf 1800m | 3yo + f |
| Oct. | Mainichi Okan (Tenno Sho Autumn Trial) | Turf 1800m | 3yo + |
| Oct. | Fuji Stakes (Mile Championship Trial) | Turf 1600m | 3yo + |
| Nov. | Copa Republica Argentina (Handicap) | Turf 2500m | 3yo + |
| Nov. | Keio Hai Nisai Stakes | Turf 1400m | 2yo |
| Nov. | Tokyo Sports Hai Nisai Stakes | Turf 1800m | 2yo |
Grade III
| Jan./Feb. | Negishi Stakes (February Stakes Trial) | Dirt 1400m | 4yo + |
| Feb. | Tokyo Shimbun Hai | Turf 1600m | 4yo + |
| Feb. | Kyodo Tsushin Hai | Turf 1800m | 3yo |
| Feb. | Diamond Stakes (Handicap) | Turf 3400m | 4yo + |
| Feb. | Queen Cup | Turf 1600m | 3yo f |
| May | Epsom Cup | Turf 1800m | 3yo + |
| Jun. | Fuchu Himba Stakes | Turf 1800m | 3yo + f |
| Oct. | Artemis Stakes | Turf 1600m | 2yo f |
| Nov. | Musashino Stakes (Champions Cup Trial) | Dirt 1600m | 3yo + |
Listed
| Jan. | Crocus Stakes | Turf 1400m | 3yo |
J-Grade II (Steeplechase)
| Jun. | Tokyo High-Jump | Turf 3300m | 3yo + |
J-Grade III (Steeplechase)
| Oct. | Tokyo Autumn Jump | Turf 3300m | 3yo + |

== Track records ==
| Date Recorded | Race | Racehorse | Jockey | Distance | Time | Sex | Weight |
Turf course (2yo)
| November 4, 2023 | Keio Hai Nisai Stakes | Corazon Beat | Takeshi Yokoyama | 1400m | 1:20.6 | Filly | 55kg |
| October 5, 2019 | Saudi Arabia Royal Cup | Salios | Shuu Ishibashi | 1600m | 1:32.7 | Colt | 55kg |
| November 16, 2019 | Tokyo Sports Hai Nisai Stakes | Contrail | Ryan Moore | 1800m | 1:44.5 | Colt | 55kg |
| November 28, 2021 | 2yo Maiden | With Grace | Christophe Lemaire | 2000m | 1:58.5 | Filly | 54kg |
Turf course (3yo+)
| May 3, 2025 | Keio Hai Spring Cup | Toshin Macau | Takeshi Yokoyama | 1400m | 1:18.3 | Horse 6 | 58kg |
| May 12, 2019 | Victoria Mile | Normcore | Damian Lane | 1600m | 1:30.5 | Filly 4 | 55kg |
| May 10, 2025 | Epsom Cup | Seiun Hades | Hideaki Miyuki | 1800m | 1:43.9 | Horse 6 | 57kg |
| October 29, 2023 | Tennō Shō (Autumn) | Equinox | Christophe Lemaire | 2000m | 1:55.2 | Colt 4 | 58kg |
| April 24, 2021 | Shinryoku Shō (3yo ALW, 1 Win) | Albilla | Christophe Lemaire | 2300m | 2:18.4 | Colt 3 | 56kg |
| November 30, 2025 | Japan Cup | Calandagan | Mickael Barzalona | 2400m | 2:20.3 | Gelding 4 | 58kg |
| May 26, 2019 | Meguro Kinen | Look Twice | Damian Lane | 2500m | 2:28.2 | Horse 6 | 55kg |
| February 18, 2023 | Diamond Stakes | Mixology | Atsuya Nishimura | 3400m | 3:29.1 | Colt 4 | 56kg |
Dirt course (2yo)
| November 4, 2017 | 2yo Newcomer | Mr Melody | Keita Tosaki | 1300m | 1:17.4 | Colt | 55kg |
| October 8, 2005 | Platanus Shō (2yo ALW, 1 Win) | Yuwa Hurricane | Eiji Nakadate | 1400m | 1:23.1 | Colt | 55kg |
| November 23, 2024 | 2yo Maiden | Luxor Cafe | Ryan Moore | 1600m | 1:35.9 | Colt | 56kg |
Dirt course (3yo+)
| November 12, 2016 | 3yo+ ALW, 2 Wins | Satono Fantasy | Keita Tosaki | 1300m | 1:16.1 | Colt 3 | 56kg |
| January 28, 2018 | Negishi Stakes | Nonkono Yume | Hiroyuki Uchida | 1400m | 1:21.5 | Gelding 6 | 58kg |
| November 1, 2025 | Perseus Stakes (OP) | J Palms | Takuya Ohno | 1600m | 1:32.9 | Gelding 5 | 56kg |
| November 24, 2007 | Japan Cup Dirt | Vermilion | Yutaka Take | 2100m | 2:06.7 | Horse 5 | 57kg |
| February 18, 2007 | 4yo+ ALW, 2 Wins | Groovin' High | Katsuharu Tanaka | 2400m | 2:28.6 | Colt 4 | 56kg |

== Gallery ==
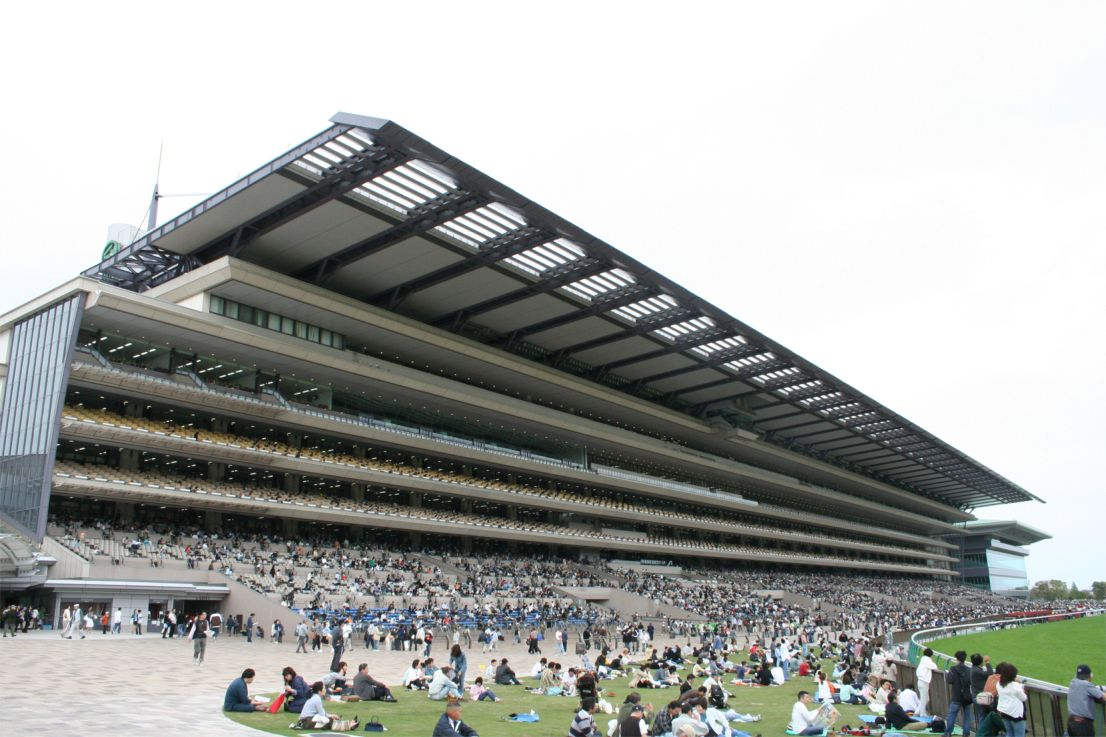
Main grandstand in 2007

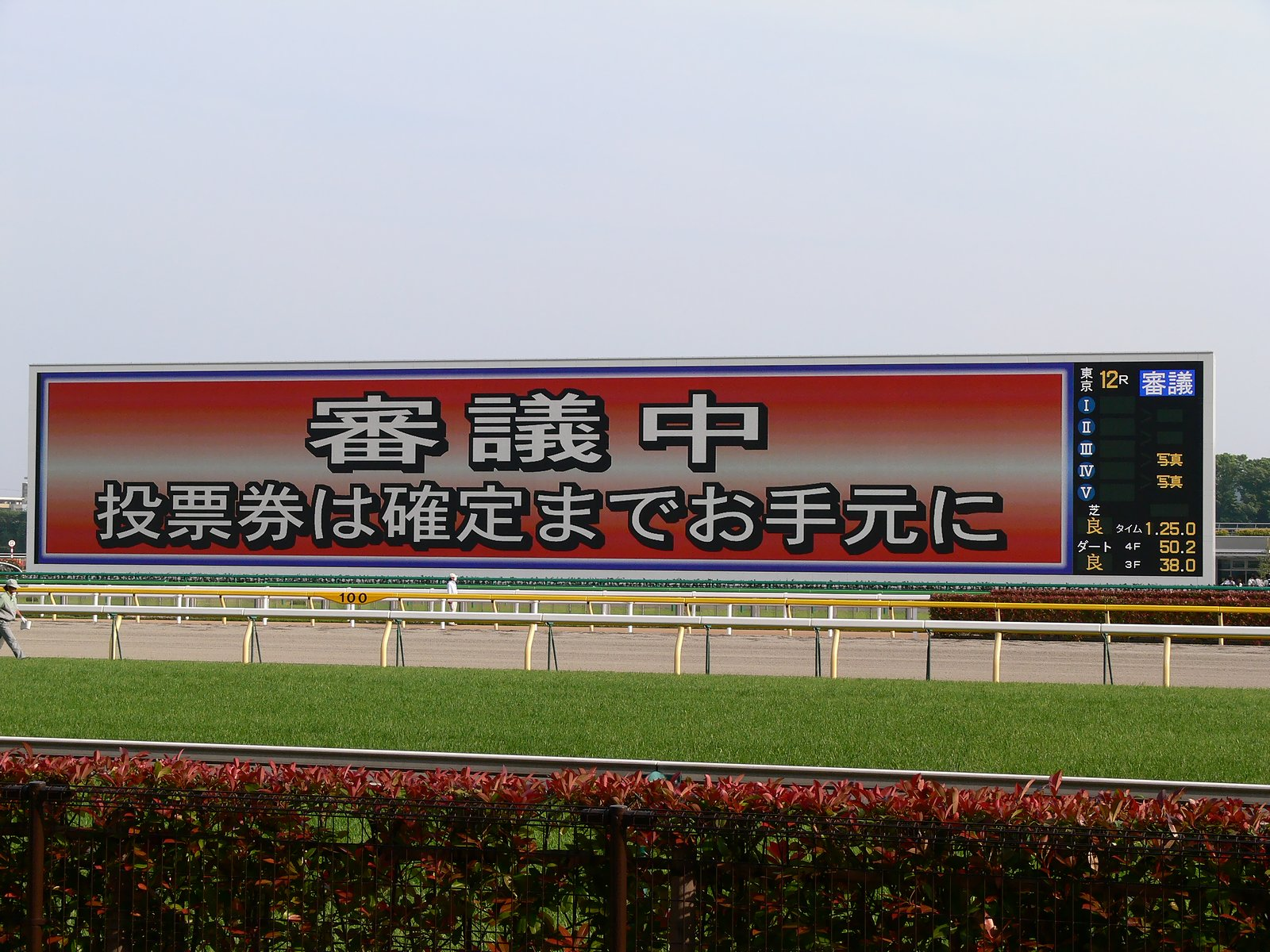
Turf Vision video screen
