= Yasuda Kinen =

Yasuda Kinen Yasuda Memorial 安田記念
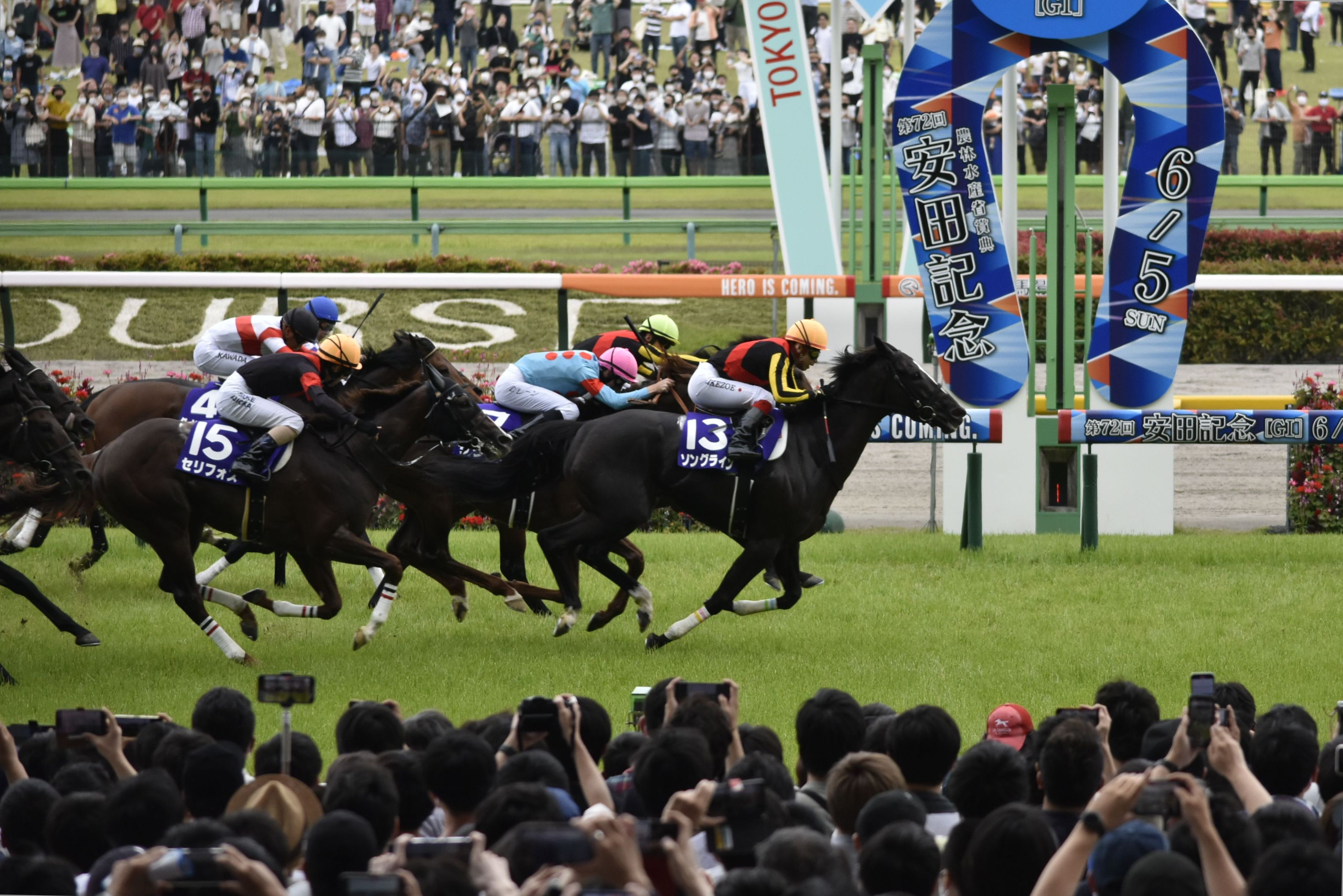
- Songline winning the 72nd Yasuda Kinen (2022)
- Class: Grade 1
- Location: Tokyo Racecourse, Fuchu, Tokyo
- Inaugurated: July 1, 1951
- Race type: Thoroughbred
- Website: japanracing.jp - Yasuda Kinen

Race information
- Distance: 1600 meters (About 8 furlongs / 1 mile)
- Record: Indy Champ (1:30.9)
- Surface: Turf
- Track: Left-handed
- Qualification: 3-y-o & Up, Thoroughbreds
- Weight: 3-y-o 54 kg, 4-y-o & up 58 kg Allowance: Fillies 2 kg
- Purse: ¥ 388,800,000 (as of 2024): 1st: ¥ 180,000,000; 2nd: ¥ 72,000,000; 3rd: ¥ 45,000,000
- Bonuses: $1,000,000 (¥115,000,000) bonus is given to any horse who wins two legs of the four-race Asian Mile Challenge, including the Yasuda Kinen.

The Yasuda Kinen (English: Yasuda Memorial, Japanese and Chinese language: 安田記念) is a Japanese International Grade I Thoroughbred horse race held at the Tokyo Racecourse in Tokyo. Raced annually each June, the Yasuda Kinen is run at a distance of eight furlongs (one mile) on turf and is open to horses three years of age and up. The event was first run in 1951 as the Yasuda Sho (安田賞) in honor of Izaemon Yasuda, the founding chairman of the Japan Racing Association. Following Yasuda's death in 1958, the race name was changed to the Yasuda Kinen.

In 1984 the race was promoted to Grade 1 status and in 1993 it was granted International Grade 1 status. In 2005, the race became the final leg of the Asian Mile Challenge. In addition to the US$1 million first place purse, another US$1 million bonus is given to any horse who wins two legs of the four-race Asian Mile Challenge.

Past winners of the Yasuda Kinen include Oguri Cap and Taiki Shuttle, both Horse of the Year honorees in Japan in 1990 and 1998 respectively. The race has also been won by international horses such as the Godolphin 1995 winner Heart Lake, and Fairy King Prawn who in 2000 became the first Hong Kong-trained horse to ever win a Grade I race outside of Hong Kong. In 2006 another Hong Kong-based champion, Bullish Luck, won the race and earned the Asian Mile Challenge bonus money for winning both the Yasuda Kinen and the Champions Mile in Hong Kong. In 2024, Romantic Warrior, Hong Kong's undisputed middle-distance champion won the Yasuda Kinen.

== Trial races ==
Trial races provide automatic berths to the winning horses.

Race	Grade	Racecourse	Distance	Condition
Yomiuri Milers Cup	GII	Kyoto	1,600 metres	Winner
Keio Hai Spring Cup	GII	Tokyo	1,400 metres	Winner

== Records ==
Speed record:

- 1.30.9 – Indy Champ (2019)

Most wins by a horse (2):

- Songline (2022, 2023)
- Swee Sue (1952, 1953)
- Vodka (2008, 2009)
- Yamanin Zephyr (1992, 1993)

Most wins by a jockey (4):

- Yukio Okabe (1982, 1989, 1997, 1998)
- Yuga Kawada (2015, 2017, 2021, 2025)
- Yutaka Take (1990, 1995, 2009, 2026)

Most wins by a trainer (4):

- Ogata Tokichi (1951, 1953, 1955, 1973)

Most wins by an owner (3):

- Sunday Racing (2020, 2022, 2023)

== Winners since 1984 ==
Year	Winner	Age	Jockey	Trainer	Owner	Time
1984	Happy Progress	6	Seiki Tabara	Shoji Yamamoto	S. Fujita	1:37.8
1985	Nihon Pillow Winner	5	Hiroshi Kawachi	Masatoshi Hattori	Hyakutaro Kobayashi	1:35.1
1986	Gallop Dyna	6	Isamu Shibasaki	Susumu Yano	Shadai Race Horse	1:35.5
1987	Fresh Voice	4	Masato Shibata	Naoyuki Sakai	Kazuo Enjo	1:35.7
1988	Nippo Teio	5	Hiroyuki Gohara	Fusamatsu Okubo	Yuichi Yamaishi	1:34.2
1989	Bamboo Memory	4	Yukio Okabe	Kunihiko Take	Tatsuichi Takeda	1:34.3
1990	Oguri Cap	5	Yutaka Take	Tsutomu Setoguchi	Shunsuke Kondo	1:32.4
1991	Daiichi Ruby	4	Hiroshi Kawachi	Yuji Ito	Haruo Tsujimoto	1:33.8
1992	Yamanin Zephyr	4	Katsuharu Tanaka	Hironori Kurita	Hajime Doi	1:33.8
1993	Yamanin Zephyr	5	Yoshitomi Shibata	Hironori Kurita	Hajime Doi	1:33.5
1994	North Flight	4	Koichi Tsunoda	Keiji Kato	Taihoku Bokujo	1:33.2
1995	Heart Lake	4	Yutaka Take	Saeed bin Suroor (UAE)	Godolphin	1:33.2
1996	Trot Thunder	7	Norihiro Yokoyama	Katsutoshi Aikawa	Teruo Fujimoto	1:33.1
1997	Taiki Blizzard	6	Yukio Okabe	Kazuo Fujisawa	Taiki Farm Co.	1:33.8
1998	Taiki Shuttle	4	Yukio Okabe	Kazuo Fujisawa	Taiki Farm Co.	1:37.5
1999	Air Jihad	4	Masayoshi Ebina	Masanori Ito	Lucky Field Co.	1:33.3
2000	Fairy King Prawn	5	Robbie Fradd	Ivan W. Allan (HK)	Philip Lau Sak Hong	1:33.9
2001	Black Hawk	7	Norihiro Yokoyama	Sakae Kunieda	Makoto Kaneko	1:33.0
2002	Admire Cozzene	6	Hiroki Goto	Mitsuru Hashida	Riichi Kondo	1:33.3
2003	Agnes Digital	6	Hirofumi Shii	Toshiaki Shirai	Takao Watanabe	1:32.1
2004	Tsurumaru Boy	6	Katsumi Ando	Kojiro Hashiguchi	Takao Tsuruta	1:32.6
2005	Asakusa Den'en	6	Shinji Fujita	Michifumi Kono	Genichiro Tahara	1:32.3
2006	Bullish Luck	7	Brett Prebble	Tony Cruz (HK)	Wong Wing Keung	1:32.6
2007	Daiwa Major	6	Katsumi Ando	Hiroyuki Uehara	Keizo Oshiro	1:32.3
2008	Vodka	4	Yasunari Iwata	Katsuhiko Sumii	Yuzo Tanimizu	1:32.7
2009	Vodka	5	Yutaka Take	Katsuhiko Sumii	Yuzo Tanimizu	1:33.5
2010	Showa Modern	6	Hiroki Goto	Hiroaki Sugiura	Keiichi Yamagishi	1:31.7
2011	Real Impact	3	Keita Tosaki	Noriyuki Hori	Carrot Farm	1:32.0
2012	Strong Return	6	Yuichi Fukunaga	Noriyuki Hori	Teruya Yoshida	1:31.3
2013	Lord Kanaloa	5	Yasunari Iwata	Takayuki Yasuda	Lord Horse Club	1:31.5
2014	Just A Way	5	Yoshitomi Shibata	Naosuke Sugai	Akatsuki Yamatoya	1:36.8
2015	Maurice	4	Yuga Kawada	Noriyuki Hori	Kazumi Yoshida	1:32.0
2016	Logotype	6	Hironobu Tanabe	Tsuyoshi Tanaka	Teruya Yoshida	1:33.0
2017	Satono Aladdin	6	Yuga Kawada	Yasutoshi Ikee	Hajime Satomi	1:31.5
2018	Mozu Ascot	4	Christophe Lemaire	Yoshito Yahagi	Capital System	1:31.3
2019	Indy Champ	4	Yuichi Fukunaga	Hidetaka Otonashi	Silk Racing	1:30.9
2020	Gran Alegria	4	Kenichi Ikezoe	Kazuo Fujisawa	Sunday Racing	1:31.6
2021	Danon Kingly	5	Yuga Kawada	Kiyoshi Hagiwara	Danox Co Ltd	1:31.7
2022	Songline	4	Kenichi Ikezoe	Toru Hayashi	Sunday Racing	1:32.3
2023	Songline	5	Keita Tosaki	Toru Hayashi	Sunday Racing	1:31.4
2024	Romantic Warrior	6	James McDonald	Danny Shum Chap-shing (HK)	Peter Lau Pak Fai	1:32.3
2025	Jantar Mantar	4	Yuga Kawada	Tomokazu Takano	Shadai Race Horse	1:32.7
2026	Sixpence	5	Yutaka Take	Hiroyasu Tanaka	Carrot Farm	1:32.1

Yasuda Kinen winners

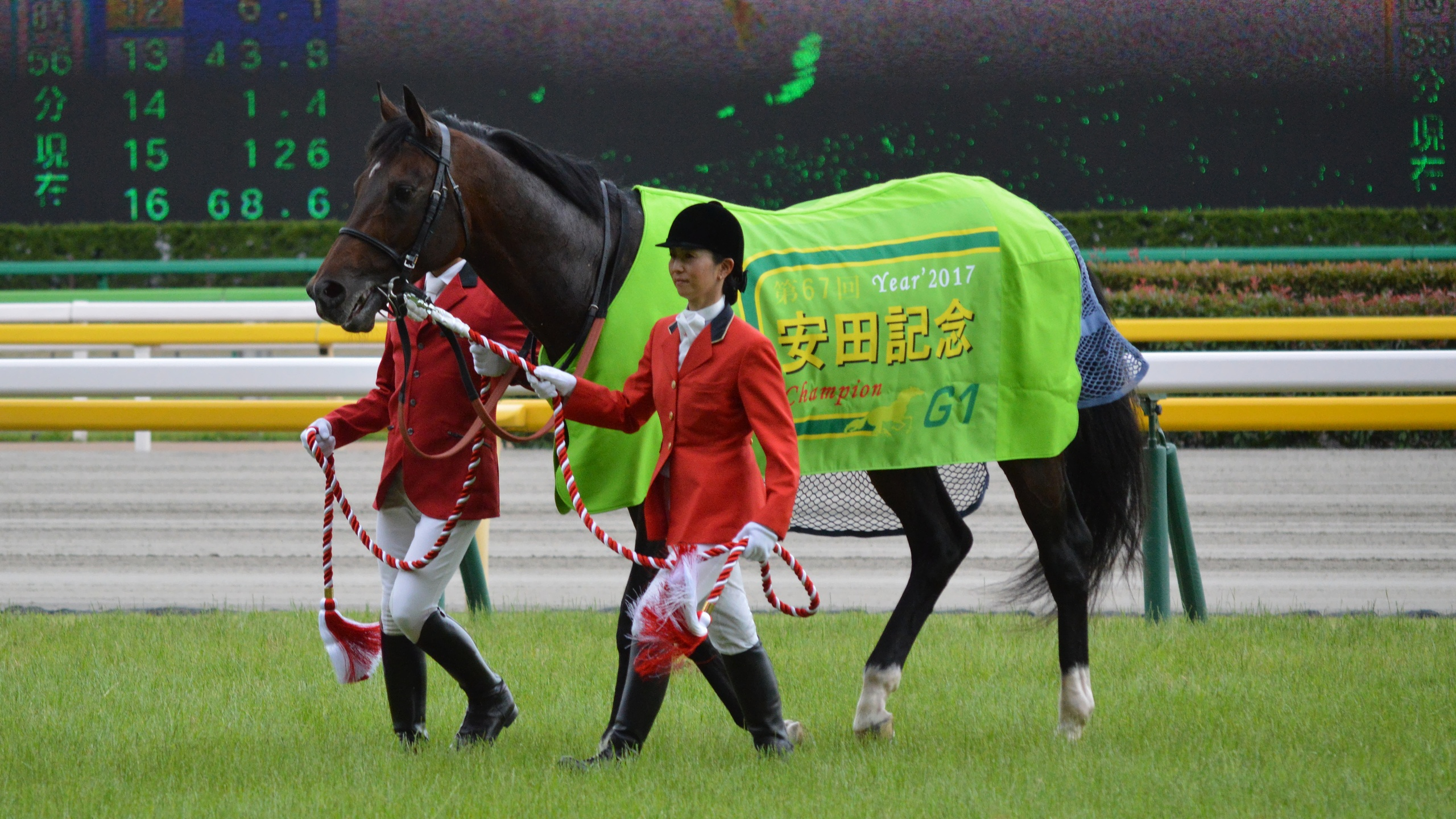
Satono Aladdin after winning the 2017 Yasuda Kinen

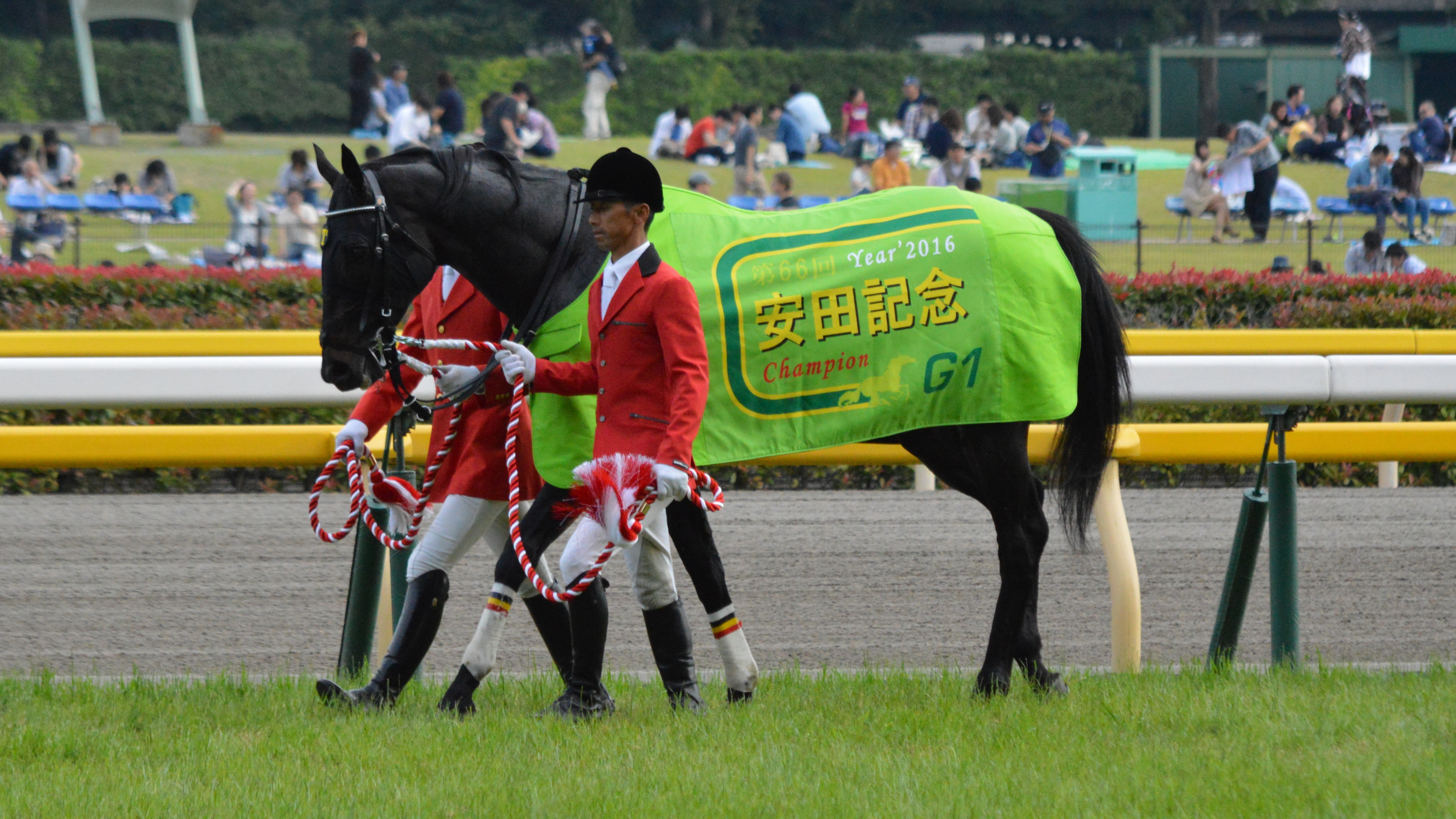
Logotype after winning the 2016 Yasuda Kinen

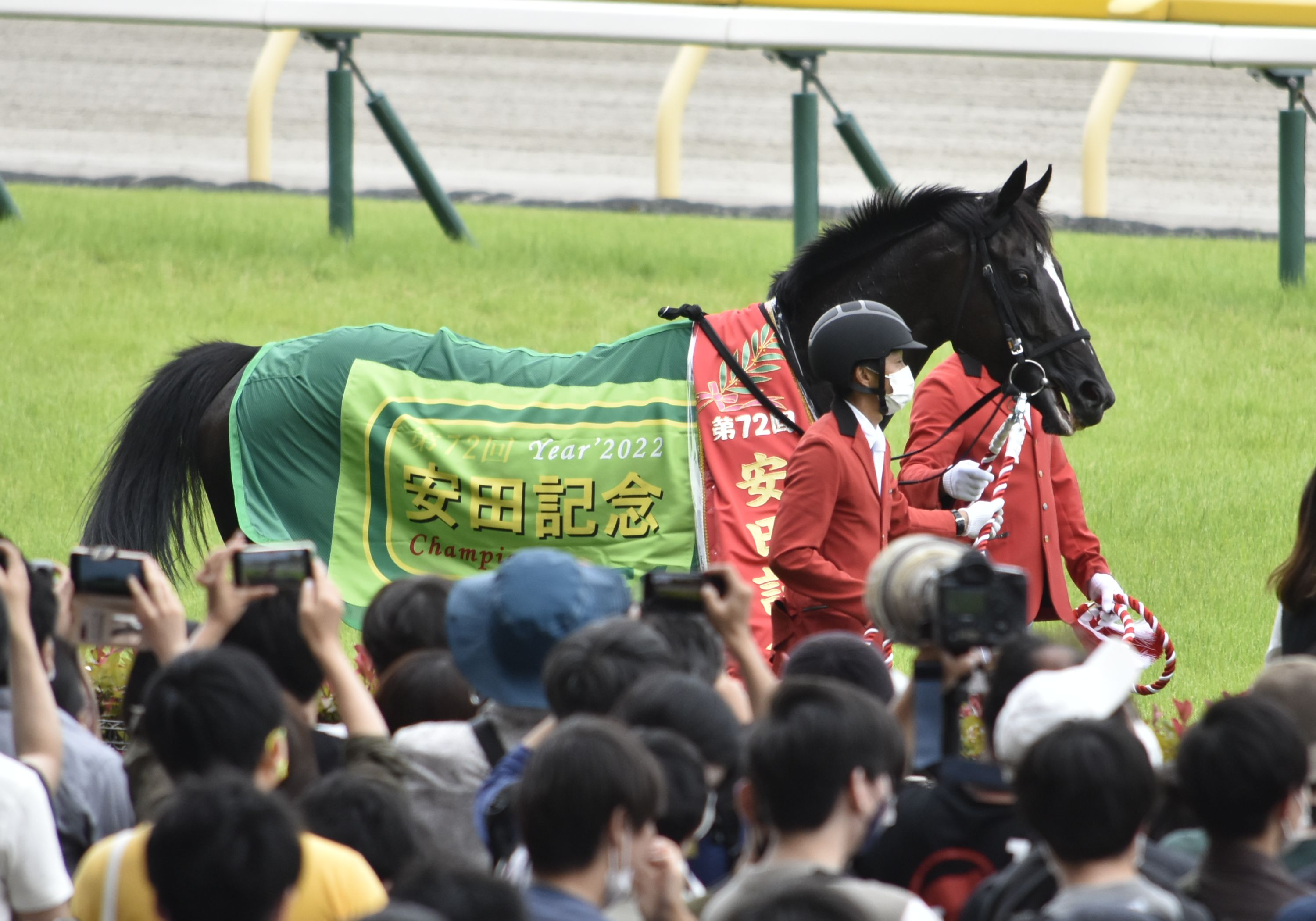
Songline after winning the 2022 Yasuda Kinen

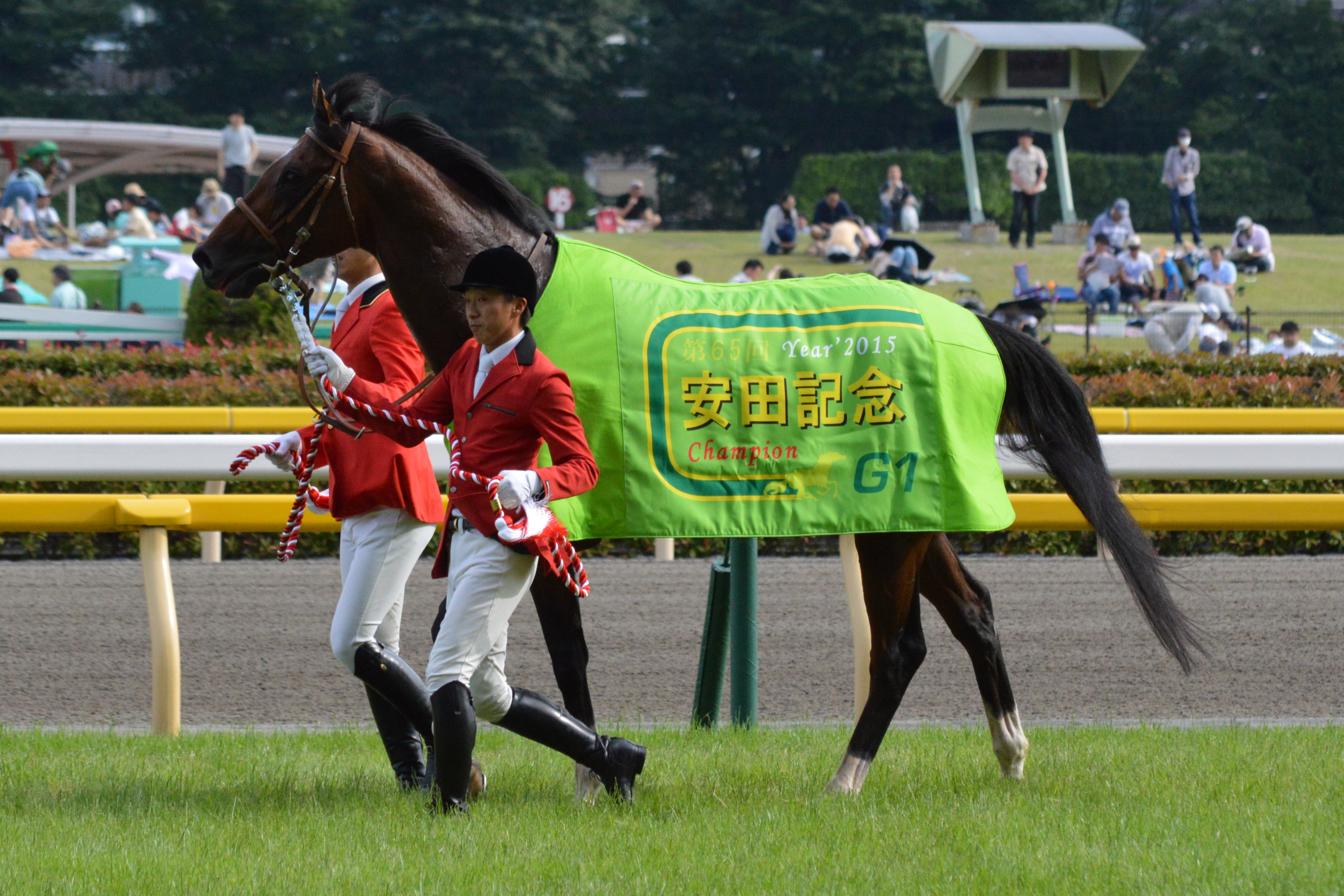
Maurice after winning the 2015 Yasuda Kinen

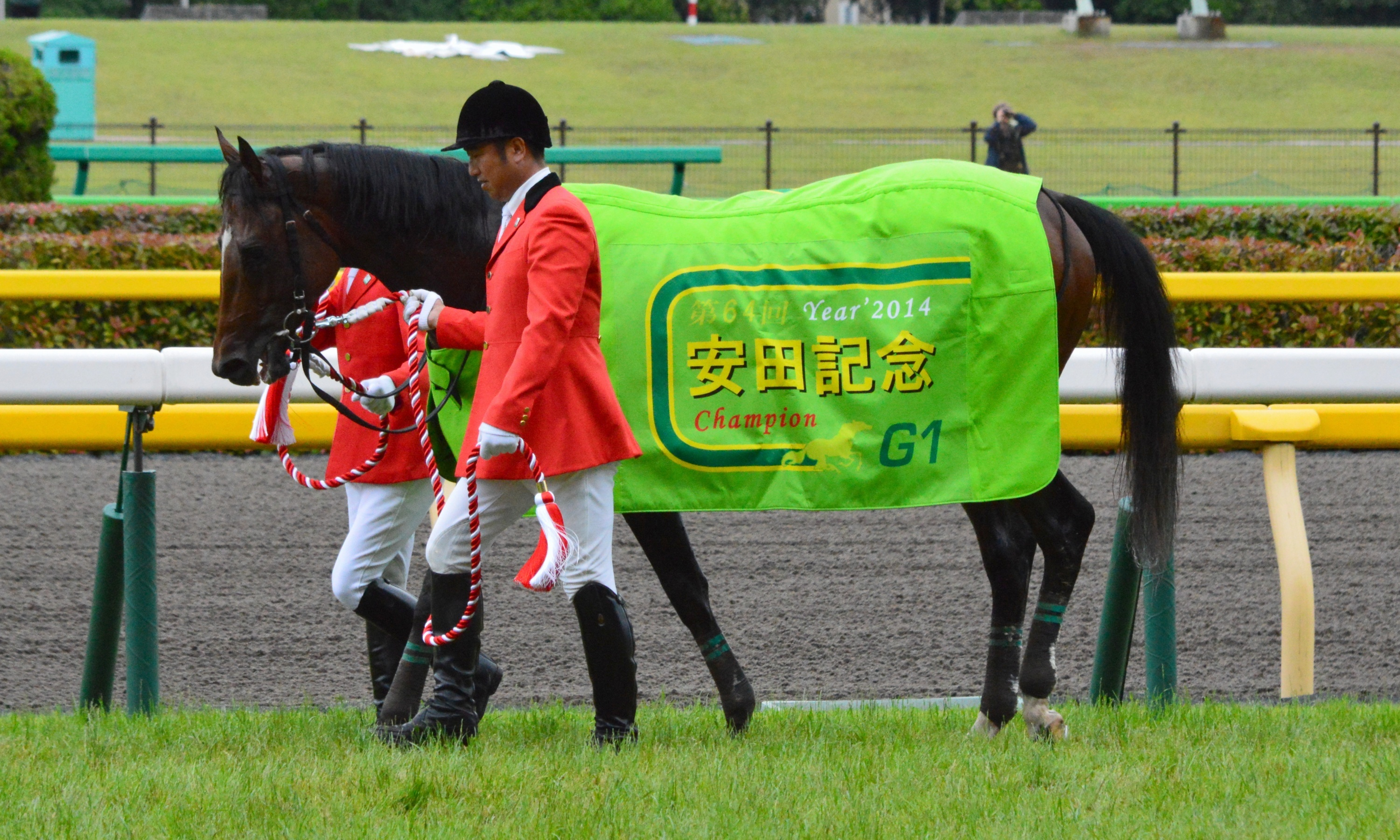
Just A Way after winning the 2014 Yasuda Kinen

== Earlier winners ==
- 1951 - Issei
- 1952 - Swee Sue
- 1953 - Swee Sue
- 1954 - Fuso
- 1955 - Kuri Chikara
- 1956 - Yoshifusa
- 1957 - Hekiraku
- 1958 - Rhapsody
- 1959 - Hishi Masaru
- 1960 - Onward Bell
- 1961 - Homareboshi
- 1962 - Tokon
- 1963 - Yamano O
- 1964 - Shimofusa Homare
- 1965 - Panasonic
- 1966 - Hishi Masahide
- 1967 - Buchan
- 1968 - Shesquay
- 1969 - Hard Way
- 1970 - Mejiro Asama
- 1971 - Harbor Game
- 1972 - Rafale
- 1973 - Haku Hosho
- 1974 - Kyoei Green
- 1975 - Sakura Iwai
- 1976 - Nishiki Ace
- 1977 - Squash Tholon
- 1978 - Nippo King
- 1979 - Royal Shinzan
- 1980 - Blue Hallez
- 1981 - Takeden
- 1982 - Sweet Native
- 1983 - Kiyo Hidaka

== See also ==
- Horse racing in Japan
- List of Japanese flat horse races
