= Ricky P. F. Yiu =

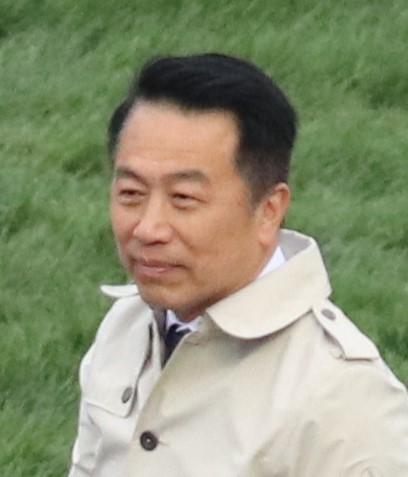
Yiu won the Hong Kong Derby 2023 as a horse trainer with Voyage Bubble on 19 March 2023

Ricky Yiu Poon Fai (born 12 July 1957) is a horse trainer in Hong Kong. He rode 15 winners as a jockey between 1974 and 1981. He received his own training license in 1995/96. In 2010/11 he added 49 winners for a career total of 455. Yiu won the Champion Trainer for the 2019/20 season.

== Significant horses ==
- Fairy King Prawn
- Sacred Kingdom
- Ultra Fantasy
- Amber Sky - 2011/12 Best Griffin
- Voyage Bubble

== Performance ==
Seasons	Total Runners	No. of Wins	No. of 2nds	No. of 3rds	No. of 4ths	Stakes won
2010/2011	487	49	50	49	46	HK$44,956,225
