= Chinese Club Challenge Cup =

Annual handicap horse race in Hong Kong

The Chinese Club Challenge Cup is a Thoroughbred handicap horse race in Hong Kong, run at Sha Tin over a distance of 1400 metres. It takes place each year on New Year's Day and was named after the Chinese Club.

Horses rated 95 and above are qualified to enter this race.

== Winners ==
Year	Winner	Age	Jockey	Trainer
1985	Mystic	4	Y P Chan	Peter Ng Bik-kuen
1986	Winning Bruno	4	M C Tam	Au Kam Hung
1987	Williamsburg	4	Tony Cruz	Lam Hung-fei
1988	Bettabob	4	B Compton	John Moore
1989	Prestige	4	Philip Waldron	Wong Tang-ping
1990	Northern Tide	6	Noel Barker	John Moore
1991	Dashing Dragon	4	Brent Thomson	Brian Kan Ping-chee
1992	Drawing Away	6	Alan Munro	Patrick Biancone
1993	Helene Star	4	Gérald Mossé	Patrick Biancone
1994	Nitrogen	4	Darren Gauci	Lawrie Fownes
1995	Quick Action	4	Basil Marcus	Ivan Allan
1996	Supreme Goliath	4	Alan Munro	Alex Wong Siu-tan
1997	Laser Star	4	K M So	Ricky Yiu Poon-fai
1998	Basic Instinct	4	Jason Weaver	Gary Ng Ting-keung
1999	Best Of The Best	5	Éric Legrix	Wong Tang-ping
2000	Schubert	4	Howard Cheng Yu-tin	David Hayes
2001	Kenwood Melody	5	Wendyll Woods	Lawrie Fownes
2002	Our Class	4	Steven King	Tony Cruz
2003	Grand Delight	5	Shane Dye	John Size
2004	Hidden Dragon	4	Felix Coetzee	Tony Cruz
2005	High Intelligent	4	Shane Dye	John Size
2006	Scintillation	5	Gérald Mossé	Danny Shum Chap-shing
2007	Floral Pegasus	3	Gérald Mossé	Tony Cruz
2008	Pocket Money	6	Felix Coetzee	John Size
2009	Joy And Fun	5	Weichong Marwing	Derek Cruz
2010	Egyptian Ra	8	Matthew Chadwick	Tony Cruz
2011	Little Bridge	4	Zac Purton	Danny Shum Chap-shing
2012	Aashiq	6	Jeff Lloyd	Paul O'Sullivan
2013	Helene Spirit	6	Zac Purton	Caspar Fownes
2014	Sterling City	5	Douglas Whyte	John Moore
2015	Rewarding Hero	6	Neil Callan	John Moore
2016	Multivictory	6	Howard Cheng Yu-tin	Tony Cruz
2017	Blizzard	5	João Moreira	Ricky Yiu Poon-fai
2018	Fifty Fifty	5	Karis Teetan	Peter Ho Leung
2019	Conte	5	João Moreira	John Size
2020	Golden Sixty	4	Vincent Ho Chak-Yiu	Francis Lui Kin-Wai
2021	Champion's Way	5	Karis Teetan	John Size
2022	Healthy Happy	5	Alexis Badel	Frankie Lor Fu-chuen
2023	Lucky Sweynesse	4	Zac Purton	Manfred Man Ka-leung
2024	Taj Dragon	5	Andrea Atzeni	Pierre Ng Pang-chi
2025	Patch Of Theta	5	Karis Teetan	Francis Lui Kin-Wai
2026	Storm Rider	5	Karis Teetan	David Hayes

== See also ==
- List of Hong Kong horse races
