= Jockey Club Cup (Hong Kong) =

The Jockey Club Cup (Hong Kong) is a set weights Group 2 Thoroughbred horse race in Hong Kong, run at Sha Tin over a distance of 2000 metres in November.

The winner, first runner-up and second runner-up would enjoy the privilege of engaging in Hong Kong Cup, which is a Group one race carried out in early December. This race was established in 2002, while named " International Cup Trial". In the 2003/2004 racing season, this race was upgraded to a domestic Group 2 event. The race was promoted to International Group 2 status in 2010. After the seasons, the race was renamed "Jockey Club Cup", which is the name that still in use today. The prize money in season 2011/12 is HK$3,000,000, which was increased to HK$3,875,000 in season 2014/15.

As Hong Kong Jockey Club has not set up any trials for Hong Kong Vase, which is another feature Group one race in Hong Kong International Race Day. Those who have an intention of participating in Hong Kong Vase would take part in this race for the Vase. Dominant, the winner of Hong Kong Vase in 2013, took the exactly same way before savouring the sweet taste of victory in the Vase. On the other hand, although Hong Kong Jockey Club has reserved four quotes for overseas contenders per year since 2009, there are no non-Hong Kong-based horses trying to claim the title by far.

== Winners ==
Year	Winner	Age	Jockey	Trainer	Time
2002	Red Pepper	5	Glyn Schofield	Brian Kan Ping-chee	2:03.90
2003	Elegant Fashion	5	Douglas Whyte	David Hayes	2:01.70
2004	Ain't Here	5	Brett Prebble	David Hayes	2:01.00
2005	Vengeance Of Rain	5	Anthony Delpech	David Ferraris	2:02.70
2006	Hello Pretty	5	Brett Prebble	Tony Cruz	2:01.70
2007	Viva Pataca	5	Darren Beadman	John Moore	2:01.50
2008	Viva Pataca	6	Darren Beadman	John Moore	2:02.41
2009	Collection	4	W C Marwing	John Moore	2:03.85
2010	Irian	4	Brett Prebble	John Moore	2:02.11
2011	Thumbs Up	7	Brett Prebble	Caspar Fownes	2:01.61
2012	California Memory	6	Matthew Chadwick	Tony Cruz	2:01.51
2013	Endowing	4	Tye Angland	John Size	2:00.60
2014	Blazing Speed	5	Neil Callan	Tony Cruz	2:01.71
2015	Military Attack	7	Zac Purton	Caspar Fownes	2:01.84
2016	Secret Weapon	6	Nash Rawiller	Dennis Yip Chor-hong	2:00.92
2017	Werther	6	Tommy Berry	John Moore	2:01.52
2018	Eagle Way	6	Silvestre de Sousa	John Moore	1:59.30
2019	Exultant	5	Zac Purton	Tony Cruz	1:59.77
2020	Furore	6	João Moreira	Tony Cruz	1:59.32
2021	Reliable Team	6	Derek Leung Ka-chun	Frankie Lor Fu-chuen	2:03.86
2022	Romantic Warrior	4	James McDonald	Danny Shum Chap-shing	1:59.23
2023	Straight Arron	5	Vincent Ho Chak-yiu	Caspar Fownes	2:01.84
2024	Romantic Warrior	6	James McDonald	Danny Shum Chap-shing	1:59.70
2025	Romantic Warrior	7	James McDonald	Danny Shum Chap-shing	2:03.72
2026	Winning Wing	6	Jerry Chau Chun-lok	Francis Lui Kin-wai	2:00.82

== See also ==
- List of Hong Kong horse races
