= Exultant (horse) =

Irish-bred Thoroughbred racehorse

- Sire: Teofilo
- Grandsire: Galileo
- Dam: Contrary
- Damsire: Mark of Esteem
- Sex: Gelding
- Foaled: March 24, 2014
- Country: Ireland
- Colour: Bay
- Breeder: Ballygallon Stud
- Owner: Ballygallon Stud; Eddie Wong Ming Chak & Wong Leung Sau Hing
- Trainer: Mick Halford; Tony Cruz
- Jockey: Shane Foley; Zac Purton
- Record: 36: 13-11-6
- Earnings: HK$83,491,900

Major wins
- Hong Kong Vase (2019); Hong Kong Gold Cup (2019); Champions & Chater Cup (2019, 2020); Queen Elizabeth II Cup (2020)

Awards
- Hong Kong Horse of the Year (2020); Hong Kong Champion Stayer (2019, 2020); Lifetime Achievement Award (2021)
- Last updated on 17 February 2026

Exultant (Chinese: 時時精綵; foaled March 24, 2014) is a five time group 1 winning Irish-Bred Thoroughbred racehorse that was raced in both Ireland and Hong Kong. He would run his first season as a three year old in Europe under trainer Mick Halford under the name Irishcorrespondent before being sold to Hong Kong, bought by bloodstock agent John McCormack for a Hong Kong-based client. There, he would be trained by Tony Cruz.

He would be awarded the title of Hong Kong Horse of the Year in 2020 and Champion Stayer in 2019 and 2020, as well as being honored with the Lifetime Achievement Award in 2021 upon his retirement. He would reach an IFHA rating of 120 in July 2010, ranked fourteenth globally.

== Background ==
Exultant is a bay horse with a white star bred in County Kilkenny, Ireland by Ballygallon Stud. He raced in Ireland under the name Irishcorrespondent before being sold to Hong Kong, where he was renamed Exultant.

Sired by the Irish stallion Teofilo, winner of the Dewhurst Stakes, National Stakes, Futurity Stakes, and the Tyros Stakes. Teofilo would go on to sire successful racehorses such as Humidor, Nations Pride, and Without A Fight. His dam Contrary was an Irish mare bred by Ballygallon Stud, racing and winning once in France before retiring to broodmare duties. Exultant is her fourth foal.

== Racing career ==
Originally intended to start as a two year old, Exultant went into pre-training at Curragh Racecourse before being sent to France, catching a virus along the way. This illness would cause him to be sent back to Ireland to recover, causing him to miss his two year old season.

=== 2017–2018: Three Year Old Season ===
Exultant, then known as Irishcorrespondent would make his first start in the Leopardstown Summer Bundle Maiden in April 2017 over a mile, finishing first, three and a half lengths in front of Music Box. He would run his next race at Curragh, winning four and a half lengths ahead of future Group 1 winner Homesman. He would go on to take third behind Churchill and Thunder Snow in the Group One Irish 2,000 Guineas, then fifth behind Benbatl in the Group Three Hampton Court Stakes at Royal Ascot over a mile and two furlongs.

Exultant would be gelded in July 2017 before making his first start in Hong Kong in the class one Panasonic Cup Handicap, finishing fifth behind Western Express under Matthew Chadwick. Pivoting to target the Four-Year-Old Classic Series, he would then place second behind Fifty Fifty in the class one Chevalier Cup Handicap. He would go on to win the class two Long Ke Handicap ahead of Consort under Zac Purton, with Purton becoming his main jockey from then on.

Considered four in January, Exultant would start in the Hong Kong Classic Mile, the first leg of the Four-Year-Old Classic Series, finishing fourth behind Nothingilikemore, going on to place second in the Hong Kong Classic Cup behind Singapore Sling and third in the Hong Kong Derby behind Ping Hai Star. He would next place second in the Kowloon Cricket Club Centenary Cup Handicap behind Prawn Baba, ridden by Brett Prebble. His next win would come in the Group Three Queen Mother Memorial Cup six lengths ahead of Prawn Baba before taking second in the Group One Champions & Chater Cup under Prebble behind Pakistan Star, ending the season with a win in the Group Three Premier Plate handicap a length and a quarter ahead of Gold Mount.

=== 2018–2019: four-year-old Season ===
Exultant would go winless for the first three races of the season before winning the Group One Hong Kong Vase a nose ahead of Lys Gracieux and Eziyra. He would go on to win the Group Three Centenary Vase and the Group One Hong Kong Gold Cup beating Dinozzo and Southern Legend respectively before finishing second in the Queen Elizabeth II Cup behind Win Bright. He would end the season with a win in the Champions & Chater Cup ahead of Rise High and Dark Dream.

=== 2019–2020: five-year-old season ===
Exultant would take third place in the Ladies' Purse behind Southern Legend before winning the Jockey Club Cup, taking his first win of the season one and a fourth lengths ahead of Furore. He would then place third behind Glory Vase and Lucky Lilac in the Hong Kong Vase before winning the Centenary Vase for the second year in a row, one and a half lengths ahead of Glorious Dragon, following with a second to Time Warp in the Hong Kong Gold Cup. He would end the season with wins in the Queen Elizabeth II cup ahead of Furore and his second win in the Champions & Chater Cup ahead of Chefano. He would be crowned Horse of the Year for this season.

=== 2020–2021: six-year-old season ===
Exultant did not win this season, placing second four races in a row before taking third place in the Hong Kong Gold Cup behind Golden Sixty, fifth in the Queen Elizabeth II Cup behind Loves Only You, and third in the Champions & Chater Cup behind Panfield in the last race of his career.

=== Retirement ===
By the time of his retirement, Exultant would become the second highest-ever earner in Hong Kong history at the time, later out-earned by California Spangle, Voyage Bubble, Ka Ying Rising, Golden Sixty, and Romantic Warrior, ranking seventh highest amongst Hong Kong's highest earning racehorses as of February 2026.

His retirement ceremony would be held on the 26th of June, 2021 at the Sha Tin Racecourse Parade Ring. He would return to his birthplace of Ballygallon Stud in Ireland upon his retirement.

== Pedigree ==
Pedigree of Exultant (IRE), bay gelding, 2014
Sire Teofilo (IRE) 2004	Galileo (IRE); 1998	Sadler's Wells (USA); 1981	Northern Dancer (CAN); 1961
Sire Teofilo (IRE) 2004	Galileo (IRE); 1998	Sadler's Wells (USA); 1981	Fairy Bridge (USA); 1975
Sire Teofilo (IRE) 2004	Galileo (IRE); 1998	Urban Sea (USA); 1989	Miswaki (USA); 1978
Sire Teofilo (IRE) 2004	Galileo (IRE); 1998	Urban Sea (USA); 1989	Allegretta (GB); 1978
Sire Teofilo (IRE) 2004	Speirbhean (IRE); 1998	Danehill (USA); 1986	Danzig (USA); 1977
Sire Teofilo (IRE) 2004	Speirbhean (IRE); 1998	Danehill (USA); 1986	Razyana (USA); 1981
Sire Teofilo (IRE) 2004	Speirbhean (IRE); 1998	Saviour (USA); 1987	Majestic Light (USA); 1973
Sire Teofilo (IRE) 2004	Speirbhean (IRE); 1998	Saviour (USA); 1987	Victorian Queen (CAN); 1971
Dam Contrary (IRE) 2007	Mark of Esteem (IRE); 1993	Darshaan (GB); 1981	Shirley Heights (GB); 1975
Dam Contrary (IRE) 2007	Mark of Esteem (IRE); 1993	Darshaan (GB); 1981	Delsy (FR); 1972
Dam Contrary (IRE) 2007	Mark of Esteem (IRE); 1993	Homage (GB); 1989	Adjal (USA); 1984
Dam Contrary (IRE) 2007	Mark of Esteem (IRE); 1993	Homage (GB); 1989	Home Love (USA); 1976
Dam Contrary (IRE) 2007	Crystal Gaze (IRE); 2001	Rainbow Quest (USA); 1981	Blushing Groom (FR); 1974
Dam Contrary (IRE) 2007	Crystal Gaze (IRE); 2001	Rainbow Quest (USA); 1981	I Will Follow (USA); 1975
Dam Contrary (IRE) 2007	Crystal Gaze (IRE); 2001	Jumilla (USA); 1992	El Gran Senor (USA); 1981
Dam Contrary (IRE) 2007	Crystal Gaze (IRE); 2001	Jumilla (USA); 1992	Refill (GB); 1981

- Exultant is 4x5x5x5 inbred to Northern Dancer, meaning that the stallion appears once in the fourth generation of his pedigree and thrice in the fifth.
