= January Cup =

The 'January Cup' is a Group 3 Thoroughbred handicap horse race which takes place annually in January at Happy Valley Racecourse in Hong Kong, run over a distance of 1800 metres. Horses rated 90 and above are qualified to enter this race.

== Winners since 2012 ==
Year	Winner	Age	Jockey	Trainer	Owner	Time
2012	Pure Champion	6	Gérald Mossé	Tony Cruz	Mr & Mrs Eddie Wong & Kameny Wong	1:48.61
2013	Military Attack	5	Weichong Marwing	John Moore	Steven Lo and Canny Leung	1:49.73
2014	Same World	6	João Moreira	John Moore	Jackson So	1:48.70
2015	Pleasure Gains	6	Douglas Whyte	Manfred Man Ka-leung	Mr & Mrs Michael Kao Cheung Chong & Vivian Kao	1:49.39
2016	Flame Hero	6	Derek Leung Ka-chun	Peter Ho-leung	Amy Li Chi Lin, April Tsui & Ben Tsui	1:48.52
2017	Harbour Master	7	Zac Purton	John Moore	Mr & Mrs Chow Kay Yui	1:49.83
2018	Eagle Way	5	Zac Purton	John Moore	Siu Pak Kwan	1:50.14
2019	Simply Brilliant	5	Alexis Badel	Frankie Lor Fu-chuen	Simply Brilliant Syndicate	1:48.83
2020	Doctor Geoff	6	Vincent Ho Chak-yiu	Francis Lui Kin-wai	Huang Kai Wen	1:48.10
2021	Savvy Nine	5	Christophe Soumillon	Douglas Whyte	Julian Hui Chun Hang & Michele Reis	1:48.68
2022	Zebrowski	5	João Moreira	Caspar Fownes	Vision Syndicate	1:48.25
2023	Money Catcher	5	Silvestre De Sousa	Frankie Lor Fu-chuen	The Sunflower Syndicate	1:47.94
2024	Happy Together	5	Alexis Badel	Frankie Lor Fu-chuen	Excellent Ride Syndicate	1:48.29
2025	Helene Feeling	5	Harry Bentley	Danny Shum Chap-shing	Helene Syndicate	1:49.19
2026	Speed Dragon	6	Lyle Hewitson	Francis Lui Kin-wai	Peter Chu Ka Lok	1:48.00

== See also ==
- List of Hong Kong horse races
