= Queen Mother Memorial Cup =

Group 3 Thoroughbred handicap horse race in Hong Kong

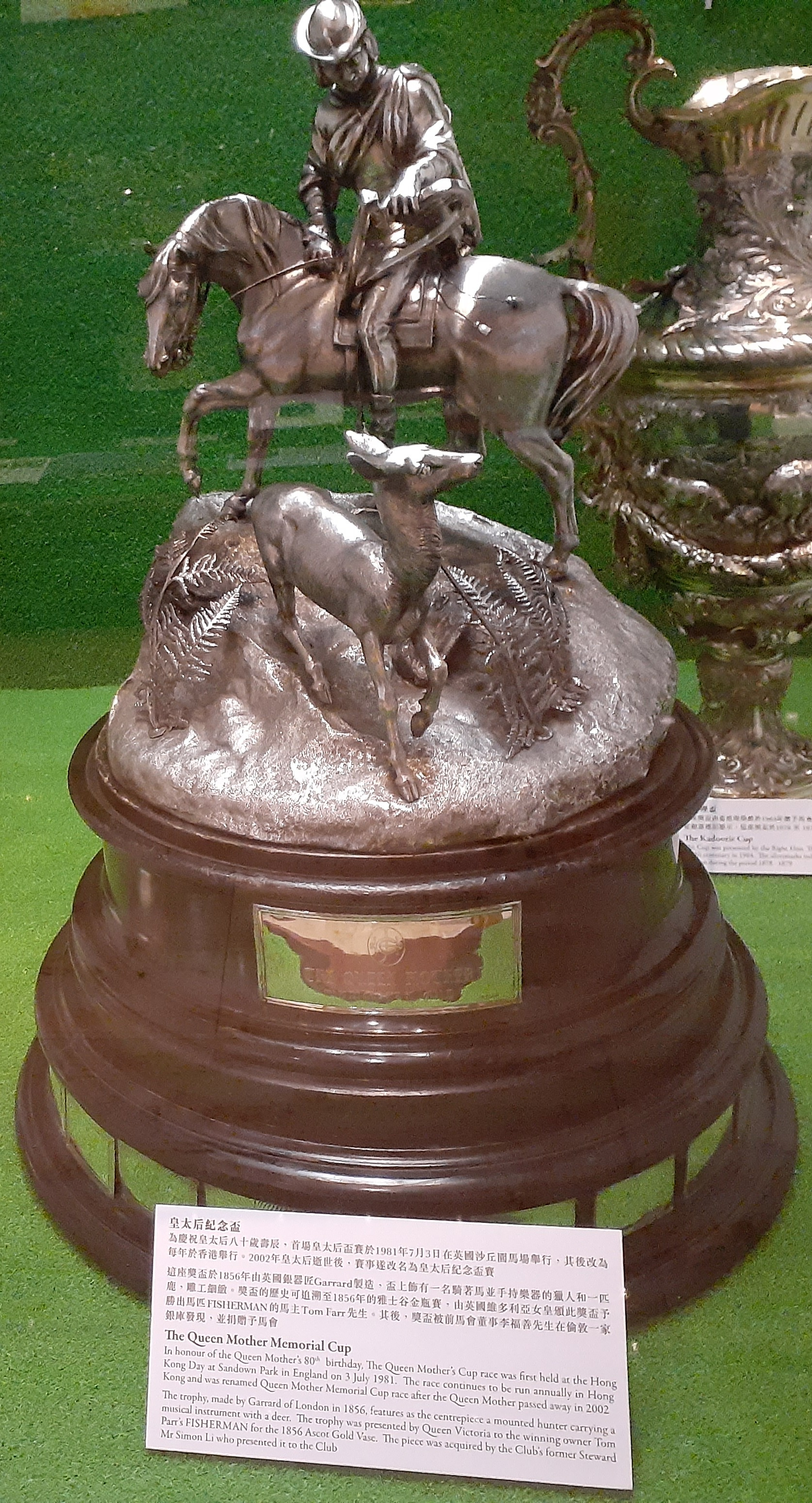
The Queen Mother Memorial Cup trophy on display at the Hong Kong Racing Museum

The Queen Mother Memorial Cup is a Group 3 Thoroughbred handicap horse race in Hong Kong in commemoration of Queen Elizabeth The Queen Mother, run at Sha Tin over 2400 metres in June.

Horses rated 80 and above which have not won a Group 1 or Hong Kong Group 1 race in the season are qualified to enter the race.

== Winners ==
Year	Winner	Age	Jockey	Trainer	Time
1981	Galveston		Willie Carson
1982	Top Champ		Philippe Paquet	M K Tam	2:13.90
1983	Dudley Wood		K S Wong	Alex Wong Siu-tan	2:23.90
1984	Midas Touch		P Young	Alex Wong Siu-tan	2:26.60
1985	Great Speed		Tony Chan Pak-hung	D Kent	2:17.50
1986	Moulton Boy		Peter Leyshan	A Ward	2:19.90
1987	Dudley Wood		Peter Leyshan	Wong Tang-ping	2:22.50
1988	Always Win		Tony Cruz	Lawrie Fownes	2:15.50
1989	Stingray		Geoff Allendorf	John Moore	2:16.70
1990	Reliable Source		Declan Murphy	Peter Ng Bik-kuen	2:20.50
1991	Wonderful World		Dennis Yip Chor-hong	Eddie Lo Kwok-chow	2:16.60
1992	Rancher		Gérald Mossé	Patrick Biancone	2:33.50
1993	Fortune Leader		Basil Marcus	David Hill	2:31.60
1994	Fortune Duke		Lance O'Sullivan	Geoff Lane	2:34.40
1995	Cricket Lord		Lance O'Sullivan	Lawrie Fownes	2:29.80
1996	Mazal	4	John Marshall	David Oughton	2:27.90
1997	Mazal	5	Éric Saint-Martin	David Oughton	2:29.40
1998	Fat Choy Together	5	Willy Kan Wai-yue	Brian Kan Ping-chee	2:31.30
1999	Ho Ho	5	Éric Legrix	Patrick Biancone	2:28.60
2000	Idol	3	Weichong Marwing	Alex Wong Siu-tan	2:30.70
2001	Rainbow And Gold	4	Éric Legrix	Brian Kan Ping-chee	2:30.70
2002	Caracoler	5	Wendyll Woods	David Hayes	2:37.10
2003	Supreme Rabbit	4	Felix Coetzee	Tony Cruz	2:27.80
2004	Industrial Success	4	Douglas Whyte	Dennis Yip Chor-hong	2:30.00
2005	Saturn	5	Robbie Fradd	Caspar Fownes	2:31.20
2006	Dr Well	5	Chris Munce	John Size	2:26.30
2007	Ever Bright	4	Danny Nikolic	Paul O'Sullivan	2:27.80
2008	Ever Bright	5	Brett Prebble	Paul O'Sullivan	2:26.80
2009	Mr Medici	4	Alex Lai Hoi-wing	Peter Ho Leung	2:27.82
2010	Fat Choy Ichiban	5	Howard Cheng Yue-tin	Dennis Yip Chor-hong	2:28.08
2011	Super Pistachio	5	Matthew Chadwick	Tony Cruz	2:30.64
2012	Dominant	4	Douglas Whyte	John Moore	2:27.75
2013	Dominant	5	Zac Purton	John Moore	2:29.98
2014	Bubble Chic	6	Karis Teetan	David Hall	2:33.62
2015	Helene Happy Star	4	Neil Callan	John Moore	2:30.70
2016	Ambitious Champion	6	Chad Schofield	Richard Gibson	2:29.75
2017	Eagle Way	4	João Moreira	John Moore	2:25.48
2018	Exultant	4	Zac Purton	Tony Cruz	2:25.98
2019	Ho Ho Khan	4	Vincent Ho Chak-yiu	David Hall	2:28.06
2020	Chefano	5	Matthew Chadwick	John Moore	2:27.05
2021	Butterfield	5	Matthew Poon Ming-fai	Danny Shum Chap-shing	2:28.14
2022	Senor Toba	4	João Moreira	Caspar Fownes	2:33.16
2023	Straight Arron	4	Vincent Ho Chak-yiu	Caspar Fownes	2:30.72
2024	La City Blanche	5	Matthew Chadwick	Tony Cruz	2:25.46
2025	Bundle Award	4	Zac Purton	John Size	2:29.72
2026	Romantic Thor	5	Matthew Poon Ming-fai	Danny Shum Chap-shing	2:30.76

== See also ==
- List of Hong Kong horse races
