= National Day Cup =

Horse race

The National Day Cup is a Group 3 Thoroughbred handicap horse race in Hong Kong, run at Sha Tin over 1000 metres. It takes place every year on 1 October, Hong Kong National Day. Originally run over 1400 metres, it replaced the Sha Tin Sprint Trophy in 2014, with the Celebration Cup a new race over 1400 metres. It is one of only two Group races run over 1000 metres in Hong Kong each year, along with January's Bauhinia Sprint Trophy.

== Winners ==
Year	Winner	Age	Jockey	Trainer	Time
1999	Score	5	Glen Boss	S T Wong	1:48.20
2000	Bumper Storm	6	Eddy Lai Wai -ming	David Hill	1:22.00
2001	Fairy King Prawn	6	Weichong Marwing	Ivan Allan	1:21.30
2002	Jeune King Prawn	5	Weichong Marwing	Ivan Allan	1:21.90
2003	Prime Witness	7	Howard Cheng Yu-tin	David Hayes	1:22.30
2004	Town Of Fionn	4	Glyn Schofield	Danny Shum Chap-shing	1:21.80
2005	Fokine	4	Howard Cheng Yu-tin	Tony Cruz	1:21.80
2006	Flaming Lamborgini	5	Howard Cheng Yu-tin	Danny Shum Chap-shing	1:20.40
2007	Tiber	7	Howard Cheng Yu-tin	John Moore	1:20.70
2008	Fellowship	6	Douglas Whyte	Paul O’Sullivan	1:21.23
2009	Egyptian Ra	8	Matthew Chadwick	Tony Cruz	1:21.65
2010	Lucky Nine	3	Brett Prebble	Caspar Fownes	1:20.43
2011	Ambitious Dragon	5	Douglas Whyte	Tony Millard	1:21.50
2012	Packing OK	6	Olivier Doleuze	John Moore	1:20.71
2013	Gold-Fun	4	Olivier Doleuze	Richard Gibson	1:20.73
2014	Bundle Of Joy	5	Vincent Ho Chak-yiu	David Hall	0:55.38
2015	Not Listenin'tome	5	Neil Callan	John Moore	0:55.90
2016	Amazing Kids	5	Brett Prebble	John Size	0:56.19
2017	Dashing Fellow	6	Vincent Ho Chak-yiu	John Moore	0:56.59
2018	Hot King Prawn	4	Karis Teetan	John Size	0:56.00
2019	Full of Beauty	5	João Moreira	John Size	0:55.16
2020	Computer Patch	4	João Moreira	Tony Cruz	0:55.84
2021	Super Wealthy	6	Alexis Badel	David Hayes	0:54.96
2022	Super Wealthy	7	Zac Purton	David Hayes	0:56.05
2023	Stoltz	6	Zac Purton	Francis Lui Kin-wai	0:55.91
2024	Beauty Waves	4	Alexis Badel	Pierre Ng Pang-chi	0:55.72
2025	Fast Network	5	Alexis Badel	Dennis Yip Chor-hong	0:55.64

== See also ==
- List of Hong Kong horse races
