= Ladies' Purse =

The Ladies' Purse is a Group 3 Thoroughbred handicap horse race in Hong Kong, run at Sha Tin over 1800 metres in October.

It is one of the oldest-established races in Hong Kong, after which a gold coin in a wallet will be presented to the winning jockey, owner and trainer by a renowned lady.

== Winners ==
Year	Winner	Age	Jockey	Trainer	Time
1981	Sea Coral		Brian Andrews	Arthur Ward\
1982	Sporting Chance		Gary Moore	George Moore
1983	Rice Bowl		Brian Rouse	Gordon Smyth
1984	Sky Inn		Philippe Paquet	T C Cheng
1985	Rondo King		C H Lau	Arthur Ward
1985	Sky Bound		David Brosnan	Lawrie Fownes
1987	Pastime		N Williams	John Moore
1987	Tim’S Billion		Danny Brereton	David Oughton
1988	Jetso		Philip Waldron	H M Cheung
1990	Fire Wind		Wendyll Woods	Lawrie Fownes
1990	Celestial Park		Jackie Tse	Lawrie Fownes
1991	Let It Ride		Danny Brereton	Geoff Lane
1992	Noble Dancer		Gérald Mossé	Patrick Biancone
1994	Crown Commander		Gérald Mossé	Lawrie Fownes
1994	Miss Piggy		H K Yim	T P Wong
1995	Deauville		Éric Legrix	Patrick Biancone
1996	China Cruise		Wendyll Woods	Lawrie Fownes
1997	Forest Spring		Robbie Fradd	Patrick Biancone
1998	Multi-Star		Glen Boss	Ricky Yiu Poon-fai
1999	Made To Figure		Douglas Whyte	David Oughton
2000	Peak Power	4	Éric Saint-Martin	David Hill
2001	Prime Witness		Dwayne Dunn	David Hayes
2002	Housemaster		Weichong Marwing	Ivan Allan
2003	Cheerful Fortune	4	Craig Williams	Andy Leung Ting-wah
2004	Russian Pearl		Felix Coetzee	Tony Cruz
2005	Willie Detroy		Felix Coetzee	Tony Cruz	1:47.80
2006	Hello Pretty		Brett Prebble	Tony Cruz	1:47.60
2007	Viva Macau	4	Darren Beadman	John Moore	1:48.50
2008	Viva Macau	5	Zac Purton	John Moore	1:47.58
2009	Iron Fist		Gregory Cheyne	Tony Millard	1:48.58
2010	Vaugirard	5	Brett Prebble	David Hall	1:47.52
2011	Jacobee	4	Tim Clark	John Moore	1:48.65
2012	Packing Whiz	4	Brett Prebble	John Moore	1:47.42
2013	Endowing	4	Tye Angland	John Size	1.46.46
2014	Packing Llaregyb	4	Mirco Demuro	Andreas Schütz	1:47.31
2015	Top Act	5	Richard Fourie	Tony Millard	1:47.06
2016	Horse Of Fortune	6	Karis Teetan	Tony Millard	1:47.17
2017	Nassa	5	Chad Schofield	Tony Millard	1:45.41
2018	Time Warp	6	Zac Purton	Tony Cruz	1:47.23
2019	Southern Legend	7	Alberto Sanna	Caspar Fownes	1:45.25
2020	Furore	6	João Moreira	Tony Cruz	1:45.91
2021	Tourbillon Diamond	5	Alexis Badel	Danny Shum Chap-shing	1:46.02
2022	Money Catcher	5	Silvestre de Sousa	Frankie Lor Fu-chuen	1:46.34
2023	Encountered	4	Derek Leung Ka-chun	Manfred Man Ka-leung	1:47.40
2024	Ensued	4	Karis Teetan	John Size	1:46.41
2025	Encountered	6	Karis Teetan	Brett Crawford	1:47.35
2026	Speed Dragon	7	Jerry Chau Chun-lok	Francis Lui Kin-wai	1:47.84

== See also ==
- List of Hong Kong horse races
