= Premier Cup (Hong Kong) =

The Premier Cup is a Group 3 Thoroughbred handicap horse race in Hong Kong, run at Sha Tin over 1400 metres in June.

Horses rated 95 and above are qualified to enter the race.

== Records ==
Most successful horse (2 wins):

- Able One – 2010, 2012

Leading jockey (3 wins):

- Zac Purton – Able One (2008), Beauty Joy (2022), Beauty Eternal (2023)

Leading trainer (4 wins):

- John Moore – Able One (2008 & 2010), Sterling City (2013), Secret Sham (2015)
- John Size – Sichuan Success (2011), Sun Jewellery (2016), Thewizardofoz (2017), Beauty Eternal (2023)

== Winners ==
Year	Winner	Age	Jockey	Trainer	Time
2007	Egyptian Ra	5	Shane Dye	David Hall	1:20.60
2008	Able One	5	Zac Purton	John Moore	1:21.50
2009	Joy And Fun	5	Brett Doyle	Derek Cruz	1:21.68
2010	Able One	7	Darren Beadman	John Moore	1:21.74
2011	Sichuan Success	4	Douglas Whyte	John Size	1:20.76
2012	Aashiq	6	Mark Du Plessis	Paul O'Sullivan	1:21.75
2013	Sterling City	4	Tommy Berry	John Moore	1:20.72
2014	Helene Spirit	7	Andreas Suborics	Caspar Fownes	1:21.01
2015	Secret Sham	5	Nash Rawiller	John Moore	1:21.46
2016	Sun Jewellery	4	João Moreira	John Size	1:21.61
2017	Thewizardofoz	5	João Moreira	John Size	1:20.86
2018	California Whip	5	Karis Teetan	Tony Cruz	1:20.57
2019	Flying Thunder	4	Grant van Niekirk	Frankie Lor Fu-chuen	1:21.16
2020	Jolly Banner	8	Matthew Poon Ming-fai	Ricky Yiu Poon-fai	1:20.89
2021	Sky Field	4	Blake Shinn	Caspar Fownes	1:20.55
2022	Beauty Joy	5	Zac Purton	Tony Cruz	1:21.55
2023	Beauty Eternal	4	Zac Purton	John Size	1:22.26
2024	Mugen	5	Karis Teetan	Pierre Ng Pang-Chi	1:21.77
2025	Copartner Prance	5	Keagan de Melo	Francis Lui Kin-wai	1:21.15
2026	Little Paradise	4	Zac Purton	Jimmy Ting Koon-ho	1:20.38

== See also ==
- List of Hong Kong horse races
