= Military Attack =

Irish-bred Thoroughbred racehorse

- Sire: Oratorio
- Grandsire: Danehill
- Dam: Almaaseh
- Damsire: Dancing Brave
- Sex: Gelding
- Foaled: 4 March 2008
- Country: Ireland
- Colour: Bay
- Breeder: P E Banahan
- Owner: Gary & Linnet Woodward; Mr & Mrs Steven Lo Kit Sing
- Trainer: John Hills; John Moore; Caspar Fownes
- Record: 29: 9-4-3
- Earnings: HKD$50,651,025

Major wins
- January Cup (2013); Hong Kong Gold Cup (2013, 2014); Premier Plate (2013); Queen Elizabeth II Cup (2013); Singapore Airlines International Cup (2013); Oriental Watch Sha Tin Trophy (2014)

Awards
- Hong Kong Horse of the Year (2013); Hong Kong Most Popular Horse of the Year (2013); Hong Kong Champion Middle-distance Horse (2013)

Military Attack (Chinese: 軍事出擊, originally named Rave) (foaled 4 March 2008) is an Irish-bred, Hong Kong trained Thoroughbred racehorse. Unraced as a two-year-old, he showed promising form in Britain in 2011 before being sold to race in Hong Kong. He continued to show useful but unexceptional form before emerging as a dominant middle-distance performer in the early part of 2013, winning the January Cup, Hong Kong Gold Cup, Premier Plate, Queen Elizabeth II Cup and Singapore Airlines International Cup. In July 2013 at the Hong Kong Jockey Club Champion Awards, he won three awards including the title of Hong Kong Horse of the Year.

== Background ==
Military Attack is a bay gelding with a white coronet on his left hind foot, bred in Ireland by P E Banahan at the Moortown Stud in County Meath. He was from the second crop of foals sired by Oratorio, an Irish racehorse best known for his wins in the Eclipse Stakes and the Irish Champion Stakes in 2005. His dam Almaaseh was a daughter of the Irish 1000 Guineas winner Al Bahathri, making her a half-sister of the 2000 Guineas winner Haafhd.

As a yearling the colt was consigned by the Moortown Stud to the Goff's sale where he was bought for €40,000 by a partnership involving the trainer John Hills. The colt was named Rave and was trained by Hills at Lambourn in Berkshire.

== Racing career ==
=== 2011: three-year-old season ===
Rave was beaten in his first two races in the spring of 2011 before recording his first success in a one-mile maiden race at Newmarket Racecourse on 28 May. After finishing second at Ayr Racecourse, Rave won two one mile handicap races at Ascot Racecourse in July.

After his final British race Rave was sold privately and was exported to race in Hong Kong where he was trained by John Moore. He was gelded and renamed Military Attack. Military Attack usually races in a red hood and a black shadow roll.

=== 2011/2102: four-year-old season ===
Military Track did not run until February 2012 when he won his Hong Kong debut. He then finished sixth, beaten less than two lengths, behind Fay Fay in the Hong Kong Derby at Sha Tin Racecourse. Three month later he started favourite for a handicap at Happy Valley Racecourse but was beaten in a three-way photo finish by Happy Guys and Pure Champion.

=== 2012/2013: five-year-old season ===
In the early part of the 2012/2013 season, Military Attack showed promise when finishing fourth to Ambitious Dragon over one mile and fifth to California Memory in the Hong Kong Cup. In early 2013 he recorded his first Group race win in the January Cup and was moved up in class and distance in February for the Group One Hong Kong Gold Cup over ten furlongs. Ridden by Zac Purton he won by two and a half lengths and a neck from Pure Champion and Xtension with the favourite California Memory unplaced. Military Attack's finishing speed was decisive, as he covered the last two furlong in 21.85 seconds.

After winning the Group Three Premier Plate he was moved back up to Group One class for the Audemars Piguet Queen Elizabeth II Cup. With Purton riding Ambitious Dragon, Military Attack was partnered by the 22-year-old Australian Tommy Berry who had never ridden in Hong Kong before and started at odds of 10.5/1. The race attracted an international field, including Eishin Flash (winner of the Japanese Derby and Tenno Sho) from Japan, Sajjhaa (winner of the Dubai Duty Free Stakes) from Dubai and two runners from South Africa. Military Attack took the lead approaching the final furlong and drew away in the closing stages and won by one and three-quarter lengths from California Memory.

On 19 May Military Attack was sent to Singapore to contest the Singapore Airlines International Cup over 10 furlongs at the left-handed Kranji Racecourse. He started at odds of 2.4/1 against a field which included runners from Singapore Dubai, the United Kingdom and Germany. Zac Purton settled the Hong Kong challenger before making ground on the inside and taking the lead one and half furlongs from the finish. Military Attack went clear of the field and won easing down by three and a quarter lengths from his stable companion Dan Excel, the winner of the Champions Mile.

=== 2013/2014: six-year-old season ===
Military Attack began his six-year-old season in the Sha Tin Trophy, a one-mile handicap race on 27 October. Carrying top weight of 133 pounds in a field which included California Memory, Xtension, Akeed Mofeed and Pure Champion and finished sixth, beaten just over three lengths by the favourite Gold-Fun. Three weeks later he started 7/5 favourite for the Jockey Club Cup, a major trial race for the Hong Kong Cup. He finished third to Endowing and Akeed Mofeed, both of whom were carrying five pounds less than the favourite. In the Hong Kong Cup on 8 December he started the 9/4 favourite, but despite finishing strongly he finished fourth of the twelve runners behind Akeed Mofeed, Tokei Halo and Cirrus des Aigles.

In January, Military Attack finished fourth behind Blazing Speed, Dan Excel and Helene Spirit in the Hong Kong Stewards' Cup. On 23 February the gelding faced Akeed Mofeed, Blazing Speed and Dan Excel in the Hong Kong Gold Cup in which he was ridden for the first time by João Moreira. Starting second favourite behind Akeed Mofeed, he took the lead inside the final furlong and accelerated clear to win by three lengths from Dan Excel. Military Attack was then sent to the United Arab Emirates to represent Hong Kong in the 2014 Dubai World Cup. He was made the 3/1 favourite but was never in contention and finished tenth of the sixteen runners behind African Story. He returned to Hong Kong in April and attempted to repeat his 2013 success in the Queen Elizabeth II Cup. He took the lead inside the final furlong but was overtaken in the closing stages and beaten a neck by his four-year-old stable companion Designs On Rome. In the following month he started 4/5 favourite for the 2014 edition of the Singapore Airlines International Cup but finished third behind Dan Excel and the French-trained Smoking Sun.

=== 2014/2015: seven-year-old season ===
Before the start of the 2014/2015 Hong Kong season, Military Attack was transferred to the table of Caspar Fownes. On his first appearance for his new trainer, Military Attack contested the Oriental Watch Sha Tin Trophy over one mile on 26 October. Starting a 13.5/1 outsider he won by a short head from Gold-Fun with Ambitious Dragon three quarters of a length away in third. The unplaced horses included Blazing Speed, Designs On Rome and California Memory.

== Assessment and honours ==
On 7 July 2013, Military Attack was named Hong Kong Horse of the Year and Hong Kong Champion Middle-distance Horse at the Hong Kong Jockey Club Champion Awards. He also won the title of Hong Kong Most Popular Horse of the Year, winning a public poll with 53,986 votes from California Memory (21,686) and Ambitious Dragon (20,865).

On 14 July 2013, Military was rated the seventh-best racehorse in the world in the World Thoroughbred Rankings and the best in the world over ten furlongs on turf.

== Pedigree ==
Pedigree of Military Attack (IRE), bay gelding, 2008
Sire Oratorio (IRE) 2002	Danehill (USA); 1986	Danzig	Northern Dancer
Sire Oratorio (IRE) 2002	Danehill (USA); 1986	Danzig	Pas de Nom
Sire Oratorio (IRE) 2002	Danehill (USA); 1986	Razyana	His Majesty
Sire Oratorio (IRE) 2002	Danehill (USA); 1986	Razyana	Spring Adieu
Sire Oratorio (IRE) 2002	Mahrah (USA); 1987	Vaguely Noble	Vienna
Sire Oratorio (IRE) 2002	Mahrah (USA); 1987	Vaguely Noble	Noble Lassie
Sire Oratorio (IRE) 2002	Mahrah (USA); 1987	Montage	Alydar
Sire Oratorio (IRE) 2002	Mahrah (USA); 1987	Montage	Katonka
Dam Almaaseh (IRE) 1988	Dancing Brave (USA); 1983	Lyphard	Northern Dancer
Dam Almaaseh (IRE) 1988	Dancing Brave (USA); 1983	Lyphard	Goofed
Dam Almaaseh (IRE) 1988	Dancing Brave (USA); 1983	Navajo Princess	Drone
Dam Almaaseh (IRE) 1988	Dancing Brave (USA); 1983	Navajo Princess	Olmec
Dam Almaaseh (IRE) 1988	Al Bahathri (USA); 1982	Blushing Groom	Red God
Dam Almaaseh (IRE) 1988	Al Bahathri (USA); 1982	Blushing Groom	Runaway Bride
Dam Almaaseh (IRE) 1988	Al Bahathri (USA); 1982	Chain Store	Nodouble
Dam Almaaseh (IRE) 1988	Al Bahathri (USA); 1982	Chain Store	General Store (Family: 9-e)
