= Centenary Vase =

The Centenary Vase is a Group 3 Thoroughbred horse race in Hong Kong, run at Sha Tin over a distance of 1800 metres in February. Horses rated 90 and above are qualified to enter this race.

== Winners ==
Year	Winner	Age	Jockey	Trainer	Trainer
2012	Packing Ok	5	Darren Beadman	John Moore	1:49.13
2013	Pure Champion	6	Gérald Mossé	Tony Cruz	1:47.32
2014	Akeed Mofeed	5	Douglas Whyte	Richard Gibson	1:46.82
2015	Designs On Rome	5	João Moreira	John Moore	1:47.26
2016	Secret Weapon	6	Douglas Whyte	Dennis Yip Chor-hong	1:47.21
2017	Supreme Profit	6	Chad Schofield	Danny Shum Chap-shing	1:47.04
2018	Dinozzo	5	João Moreira	John Size	1:48.74
2019	Exultant	5	Hugh Bowman	Tony Cruz	1:45.68
2020	Exultant	6	Zac Purton	Tony Cruz	1:46.01
2021	Glorious Dragon	6	Matthew Poon Ming-fai	Francis Lui Kin-wai	1:46.01
2022	Zabrowski	5	Matthew Poon Ming-fai	Caspar Fownes	1:46.63
2023	Senor Toba	5	Hugh Bowman	Caspar Fownes	1:48.37
2024	Nimble Nimbus	6	Andrea Atzeni	Ricky Yiu Poon-fai	1:47.40
2025	Chancheng Glory	5	Hugh Bowman	Francis Lui Kin-wai	1:46.67
2026	Numbers	4	Derek Leung Ka-chun	Frankie Lor Fu-chuen	1:46.36

== See also ==
- List of Hong Kong horse races
