= Hong Kong Champion Griffin =

The Hong Kong Champion Griffin is an honour given in Hong Kong Thoroughbred horse racing. It is awarded annually by the Hong Kong Jockey Club (HKJC). A Griffin is a horse of two or three years of age which has been imported to Hong Kong without previously racing.

The honour is part of the Hong Kong Jockey Club Champion Awards and is awarded at the end of the Hong Kong season in July.

== Winners ==
Year	Horse	Age	Bred	Trainer	Owner
1998/1999	Kingston Treasure	3	NZ	Gary T. K. Ng	Kingston Town Syndicate
1999/2000	Fibber	3	AUS	Andy T. W. Leung	Billy Woo Pak Yuen
2000/2001	Lifeline Express	3	AUS	Anthony T Millard	Eddy Fong Ching
2001/2002	Able Choice	3	AUS	John Moore	Dr & Mrs Cornel Li Fook Kwan
2002/2003	Silent Witness	3	AUS	Anthony S. Cruz	Arthur Antonio da Silva, Betty da Silva, Antonio Marcus da Silva & Teresa Marie da Silva
2003/2004	Great Win	3	AUS	David A. Hayes	Lam Man Chan
2004/2005	Good Ba Ba	3	USA	Alex Y O Wong; Andreas Schütz; Derek Cruz; Michael Chang	John Yuen Se Kit
2005/2006	Floral Pegasus	3	AUS	Anthony S. Cruz	Jacky Chan Cheung Ming and Mr & Mrs Sammy Chan Cheong Yuk
2006/2007	Joy and Fun	3	NZ	Derek Cruz	Mr & Mrs Johnny Wong Chun Nam
2007/2008	Ichiban	3	AUS	John Size	The Hon Ronald Arculli
2008/2009	Royal Flush	3	IRE	Anthony T. Millard	Michael N Smith
2009/2010	Entrapment	3	AUS	John Size	Benson Lo Tak Wing
2010/2011	Bear Hero	2	AUS	David Ferraris	Peter P C Fan, Dr Michael Mok Hing Hung & Montgomery Ho Shun Wah
2011/2012	Amber Sky	2	AUS	Ricky P. F. Yiu	Hung Kam Po
2012/2013	All You Wish	3	NZ	Dennis Yip	Carmen Chan Wing Yee & Chan Fut Yan
2013/2014	Bullish Smart	3	GER	Anthony S. Cruz	Wong Wing Keung
2014/2015	Thewizardofoz	3	AUS	John Size	Martin Siu Kim Sun
2015/2016	Mr Stunning	3	AUS	John Size	Maurice Koo Win Chong
2016/2017	Premiere	3	AUS	John Moore	DTFU Principal Syndicate
2017/2018	Pick Number One	3	NZ	Danny Shum	Yu Mo Man
2018/2019	Champion's Way	3	AUS	John Size	Dr & Mrs Arthur Leung, Elaine Leung and Angela Leung
2019/2020	Good Luck Friend	3	NZ	Ricky P. F. Yiu	Siu Chak Wai & Siu Wing Kin
2020/2021	Fantastic Treasure	3	AUS	David A. Hayes	Ken Leung Woon Kin & Leung Kwun
2021/2022	Lucky Sweynesse	3	NZ	Manfred K. L. Man	Cheng Ming Leung, Cheng Yu Tung, Cheng Mei Mei & Cheng Yu Wai
2022/2023	Howdeepisyourlove	3	NZ	John Size	Lo Profile Syndicate
2023/2024	Ka Ying Rising	3	NZ	David A. Hayes	Ka Ying Syndicate
2024/2025	Sky Jewellery	3	AUS	John Size	Tung Moon Fai
