= Peter Wu =

Peter Wu may refer to:

- Peter Wu Guosheng (1768–1814), Chinese Catholic martyr saint
- Peter Wu Junwei (1963–2022), Chinese Catholic bishop

== See also ==
- Peter Wing (吳榮添; 1914–2007), Canadian politician
- Peter Woo (吳光正; born 1946), Hong Kong billionaire businessman
- Peter B. K. Ng (伍碧權; born 1947), Hong Kong horse trainer
- Peter Ng (disambiguation)
