= The Chinese Club =

Private members' club in Hong Kong

- Formation: 1897 (129 years ago)
- Founders: Tse Tsan-tai
- Founded at: Wyndham Street, Central
- Type: Gentlemen's club
- Purpose: A gentlemen's social club for Chinese merchants in Hong Kong
- Location: Chinese Club Building, 21–22 Connaught Road Central, Central
- Members: Historically Chinese and Eurasian merchants, and comprador
- Website: https://www.chineseclub.hk/

The Chinese Club (Chinese: 華商會所) is a private members' club in Central, Hong Kong. When it was first founded in 1897, its members were exclusively Chinese (including Eurasian), many of whom served as compradors in Western mercantile firms.

The Chinese Club Challenge Cup, named after the club, is a Thoroughbred handicap horse race in Hong Kong, run at Sha Tin. It takes place each year on New Year's Day and is one of the Group 3 (G3) races hosted by the Hong Kong Jockey Club.

== History ==
The Chinese Club was established in 1897 by Tse Tsan-tai), an Australian-born social and political reformer, merchandiser and reporter, whose stated vow was to overthrow the Qing dynasty by force. He co-founded South China Morning Post (SCMP) with Alfred Cunningham, in 1903. At the time the club was founded, Chinese (or part Chinese) men were barred from joining the prestigious, whites-only Hong Kong Club, irrespective of their social or business standing in the community.

Tse, together with Cheung Tsoi, Luk King-fo and Leung Lan-fan, decided to found a parallel club for Chinese to meet and socialise, and to raise funds from wealthy local businessmen for the revolutionary cause. At the time, Tse knew many local business leaders who were sympathetic to the cause, such as Robert Ho Tung.

Ho Tung became the club's first chairman, the effect of which was to project a softer, less revolutionary image in the minds of the Hong Kong Police, thereby reducing the likelihood of a raid by authorities.

In the reception hall of the club, there is a photograph of Sun Yat-sen, credited with leading the 1911 Revolution and overthrowing the Qing dynasty. After attending a cocktail reception held at the club in 1913, Sun personally signed the photograph and presented it as a gift. This shows that the history of the club is linked with Sun, revered by both the Republic of China, which designates him "Father of the Nation," and the People's Republic of China, which honors him as the "Forerunner of the Revolution."

Originally located on Wyndham Street, the club moved to Queen's Road. From the 1920s until 1964, it was housed on the top floor of the Bank of Canton Building at 6 Des Voeux Road Central (opposite Prince's Building). The club moved into its own premises in 1967.

== Membership ==
Originally, the membership was open to "any Chinese man" (this included Eurasians). Although membership is now open to all people of Chinese origin, each applicant of good character must be nominated by one club member and seconded by another. Application forms are available only through members.

== The Chinese Club Building ==
The Clubhouse building at 21–22 Connaught Road Central opened on 1 February 1967.

The club created a building fund in 1927. Two adjacent three-storey buildings were purchased on 30 November 1940. One building was sold during the Japanese occupation to pay off outstanding debts.

In the 1960s, construction of a neighbouring building compromised the pilings underneath the club's building, forcing the Government to declare it as condemned. The club then built a new 17-storey Clubhouse and sold the basement and first three floors of the building to pay off the construction mortgages.

The club currently owns 12 floors of the Chinese Club Building. The 8th to the 15th floors house the club's facilities, of which the 11th and 13th floors are member exclusive.

== Horse Racing ==
The Chinese Club Challenge Cup is held on 1 January each year in the Sha Tin Racecourse, and was first held on 21 February 1905 in the city. The club’s chairman presents the trophy to the winning jockey, trainer, and owner.

Winning horses include Little Bridge, Golden Sixty, Lucky Sweynesse, etc.
