= Gold-Fun =

Irish-bred Thoroughbred racehorse

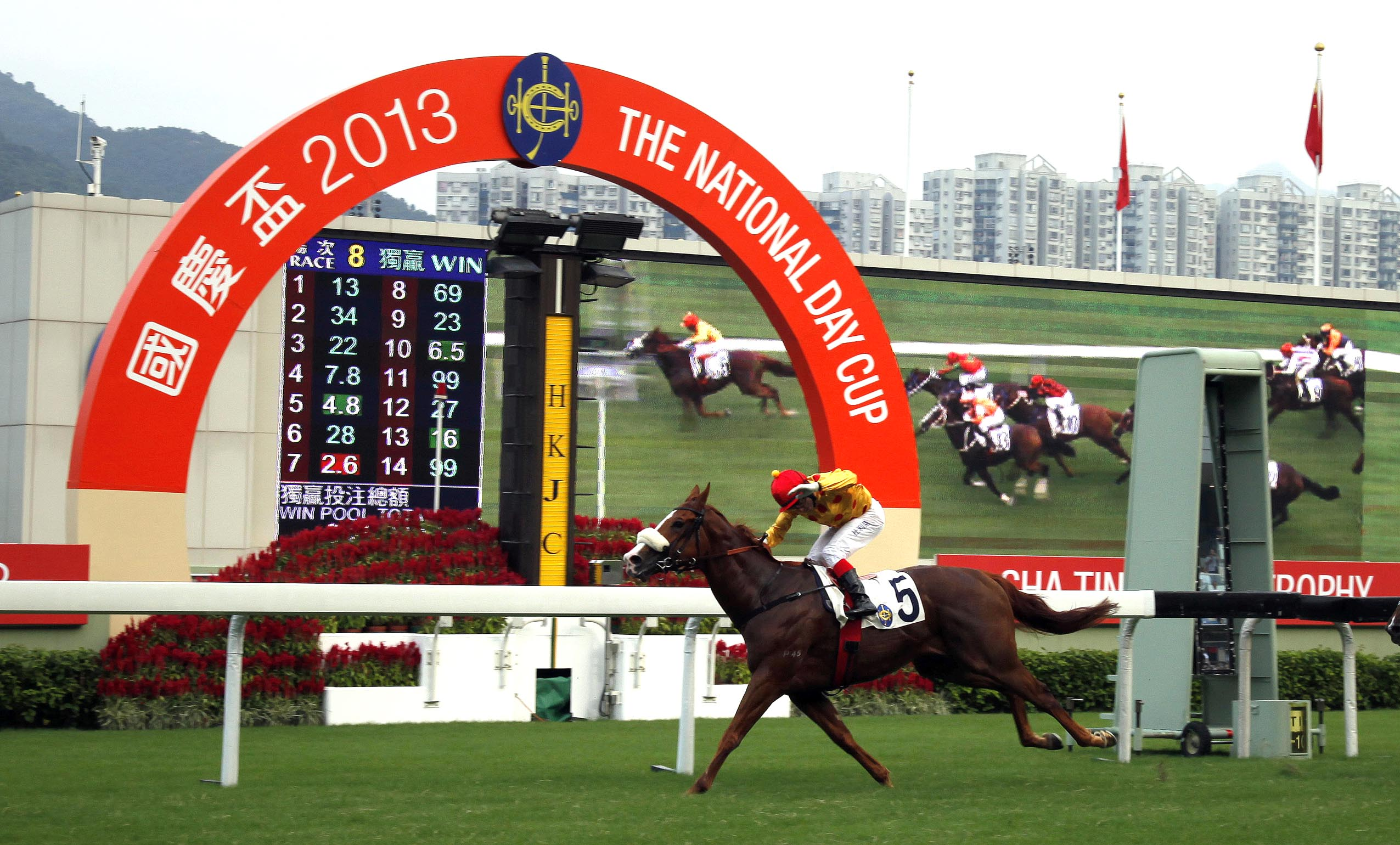
- Sire: Le Vie Dei Colori
- Dam: Goodwood March
- Damsire: Foxhound
- Sex: Gelding
- Foaled: 17 January 2009
- Country: Ireland
- Colour: Chestnut
- Owner: Pan Sutong (Hong Kong)
- Trainer: G M Lyons (Ireland); Richard Gibson (Hong Kong)
- Record: 31: 11-10-2
- Earnings: €5,559,889; HK$47,644,750

Major wins
- Hong Kong Classic Mile (2013)

Awards
- Hong Kong Champion Miler (2013/14)
- Last updated on June 28, 2016

Gold-Fun (大運財, formerly known as Strada Colorato 17 January 2009 – 7 August 2016) was an Irish-bred Thoroughbred racehorse trained in Hong Kong since 2012. He is notable for winning the Hong Kong Classic Mile 2013, National Day Cup 2013 (HKG3–1400m), the HKG2 Oriental Watch Sha Tin Trophy, the HKG1 Queen's Silver Jubilee Cup 2014 and the Celebration Cup 2014.

== Background ==
Born on 17 January 2009 in Ireland, Gold-Fun was sired by Le Vie Dei Colori, a fourteen-time winner including the champion of Premio Vittorio Di Capua (GI) of Italy.

== Racing career ==
During his time in Ireland, Gold-Fun won a race and finished 2nd in another.

Gold-Fun acquired his first Class 3 1600m champion in his second race in Hong Kong in December 2012, thanks to his quick adaptation to environment. His consistent improvement led him to the championship of a Class 2 1600m race on the first day of 2013 and to the championship of the Hong Kong Classic Mile 2013 nineteen days later. He is also the 2nd runner-up of BMW Hong Kong Derby 2013, losing only by a neck to the champion Akeed Mofeed.

On 1 October 2013, he was crowned champion of the National Day Cup 2013. Not long after that victory, he won the HKG2 Oriental Watch Sha Tin Trophy at Sha Tin racecourse on 27 October 2013. Gold-Fun continued his victory by winning the G2 BOCHK Wealth Management Jockey Club Mile on 17 November. Gold-Fun was the 1st runner-up of the G1 LONGINES Hong Kong Mile on 8 December 2013, losing by three-quarters of a length to the champion Glorious Days. Gold-Fun stamped his class on the HKG1 Queen's Silver Jubilee Cup (1400m) at Sha Tin racecourse on 16 March 2014, with a commanding half-length victory over the consistently gallant Dan Excel.

Gold-Fun had defied a 130lbs burden and a troubled stretch run to land the spoils in the 1400m contest from a star-studded field of rivals, and claimed the trophy of the Celebration Cup held on 5 October 2014. On 15 February 2015, Gold-Fun gained his first victory at a distance short of 1400m at HKG1 1200M The Chairman's Sprint Prize, winning a short-head from Aerovelocity. Gold-Fun continued his victory by winning the G2 BOCHK Wealth Management Jockey Club Sprint from Not Listenin’tome and Peniaphobia. On 18 June 2016, Gold-Fun ran second in the 1200m G1 Diamond Jubilee Stakes at Royal Ascot, losing narrowly by a neck to the champion Twilight Son. In the Prix Maurice de Gheest at Deauville Racecourse on 7 August he was in third place when he fell 75 metres from the finish and sustained fatal injuries.

== Racing record ==
Date	Racecourse	Distance	Race Class	Name of Race	Actual Weight	Jockey	Place	Finishing Time	Length Behind Winner	Champion(1st Runner-up)
04/08/2011	Ireland	Good – 1400M		7f. Flat Maiden 1st	129	K. Latham	2/13	1.32.23	5	Learn
21/04/2012	Ireland	Good to Yielding – 1600M		1m. Flat Maiden 1st	131	G Carroll	1/20	1.42.87	shd	(Lucciola)
18/11/2012	Sha Tin	Turf – 1400M		Class 3 – Lion Rock Handicap	129	O. Doleuze	5/14	1.23.02	3-1/2	Shahjee
16/12/2012	Sha Tin	Turf – 1600M		Class 3 – Luk Wu Handicap	125	D. Whyte	1/14	1.35.86	2	(Jolly Victor)
01/01/2013	Sha Tin	Turf – 1600M		Class 2 – Tai Mo Shan Handicap	116	D. Whyte	1/14	1.35.48	1/2	(Endowing)
20/01/2013	Sha Tin	Turf – 1600M	Hong Kong Group One	The Hong Kong Classic Mile	126	D. Whyte	1/14	1.34.27	N	(Garlic Boy)
17/02/2013	Sha Tin	Turf – 1800M	Hong Kong Group One	The Hong Kong Classic Cup	126	D. Whyte	4/14	1.49.11	1-1/4	It Has To Be You
17/03/2013	Sha Tin	Turf – 2000M	Hong Kong Group 1	The BMW Hong Kong Derby 2013	126	Olivier Doleuze	3/13	2.01.94	1/2	Akeed Mofeed
05/05/2013	Sha Tin	Turf – 1600M	Group One	The Champions Mile	126	O. Doleuze	5/9	1.33.95	3-1/4	Dan Excel
01/10/2013	Sha Tin	Turf – 1400M	Hong Kong Group Three	The National Day Cup (Handicap)	124	O. Doleuze	1/14	1.20.73	1-3/4	(Blazing Speed)
27/10/2013	Sha Tin	Turf – 1600M	Hong Kong Group Two	The Oriental Watch Sha Tin Trophy (Handicap)	123	O. Doleuze	1/12	1.34.05	1/2	(Helene Spirit)
17/11/2013	Sha Tin	Turf – 1600M	Group Two	The BOCHK Wealth Management Jockey Club Mile	123	O. Doleuze	1/9	1.33.89	SH	(Helene Spirit)
8/12/2013	Sha Tin	Turf – 1600M	Group One	The Longines Hong Kong Mile	126	O. Doleuze	2/14	1.33.75	3/4	Glorious Days
19/01/2014	Sha Tin	Turf – 1600M	Hong Kong Group One	The Stewards' Cup	126	O. Doleuze	6/11	1.34.24	2	Blazing Speed
16/03/2014	Sha Tin	Turf – 1400M	Hong Kong Group One	The Queen's Silver Jubilee Cup	126	D. Whyte	1/11	1.21.85	1/2	(Dan Excel)
04/05/2014	Sha Tin	Turf – 1600M	Group One	The Champions Mile	126	D. Whyte	5/14	1.35.05	6	Variety Club
06/10/2014	Sha Tin	Turf – 1400M	Hong Kong Group Three	The Celebration Cup (Handicap)	130	D. Whyte	1/12	1.21.44	3/4	(Super Lifeline)
26/10/2014	Sha Tin	Turf – 1600M	Hong Kong Group Two	The Oriental Watch Sha Tin Trophy (Handicap)	133	D. Whyte	2/14	1.34.39	SH	Military Attack
23/11/2014	Sha Tin	Turf – 1600M	Group Two	The BOCHK Wealth Management Jockey Club Mile	128	D. Whyte	2/10	1.33.80	2-1/4	Able Friend
14/12/2014	Sha Tin	Turf – 1600M	Group One	The Longines Hong Kong Mile	126	D. Whyte	2/10	1.34.17	4-1/4	Able Friend
25/01/2015	Sha Tin	Turf – 1600M	Group One	The Steward's Cup	126	D. Whyte	6/9	1.34.05	3-1/2	Able Friend
15/02/2015	Sha Tin	Turf – 1200M	Hong Kong Group One	The Chairman's Sprint Prize	126	Christophe Soumillon	1/12	1.08.79	SH	(Aerovelocity)
15/03/2015	Sha Tin	Turf – 1400M	Group One	The Queen's Silver Jubilee Cup	126	C. Soumillon	3/11	1.21.57	3	Able Friend
26/04/2015	Sha Tin	Turf – 1200M	HKG2	The Sprint Cup	128	Olivier Peslier	2/10	1.08.58	1-1/4	Dundonnell
25/10/2015	Sha Tin	Turf – 1200M	HKG2	The Premier Bowl (Handicap)	127	D. Whyte	2/14	1.08.44	1/2	Able Friend
21/11/2015	Sha Tin	Turf – 1200M	G2	The BOCHK Wealth Management Jockey Club Sprint	128	C. Soumillon	1/11	1.08.31	1-1/4	(Peniaphobia)
13/12/2015	Sha Tin	Turf – 1200M	G1	The Longines Hong Kong Sprint	126	C. Soumillon	2/13	1.08.82	1/2	Peniaphobia
31/01/2016	Sha Tin	Turf – 1200M	HKG1	The Centenary Sprint Cup	126	C. Soumillon	2/12	1.08.58	1-1/2	Aerovelocity
28/02/2016	Sha Tin	Turf – 1400M	G1	The Queen's Silver Jubilee Cup	126	C. Soumillon	4/9	1.21.50	2-1/4	Contentment
01/05/2016	Sha Tin	Turf – 1200M	G1	The Chairman's Sprint Prize	126	O. Peslier	4/14	1.09.07	2-1/4	Chautauqua
18/06/2016	Ascot	Turf – 1200M	G1	Diamond Jubilee Stakes	129	C. Soumillon	2/9	1.13.7	1/2	Twilight Son
