= Peter Ng =

Peter Ng may refer to:

- Peter Huang (黃文雄, born 1937), Taiwanese activist for democratization and human rights
- Peter B. K. Ng (Peter B. K. Ng, born 1947), horse trainer in Hong Kong
- Peter Ng (tong member), member of the Joe Boys and perpetrator of the Golden Dragon massacre in San Francisco Chinatown
- Peter Kee Lin Ng, marine biologist at NUS
- Peter Ng Kok Song (born 1948), Singaporean investor and presidential candidate in the 2023 Singaporean presidential election
