= Premier Plate =

Horse race in Hong Kong

The Premier Plate is a Group 3 Thoroughbred handicap horse race in Hong Kong, run at Sha Tin over 1800 metres in June.

Horses rated 90 and above are qualified to enter the race.

== Records ==
Leading jockey (4 wins):

- Zac Purton – Military Attack (2013), Exultant (2018), Southern Legend (2021), Tuchel (2023)

Leading trainer (3 wins):

- Caspar Fownes – Thumbs Up (2012), Rise High (2019), Dances With Dragon (2020)
- John Moore – Military Attack (2013), Harbour Master (2015), Helene Paragon (2016)

== Winners ==
| Year | Winner | Age | Jockey | Trainer | Time |
| 2006 | Beethoven | 6 | Brett Prebble | David Hall | 1:48.20 |
| 2007 | Sir Ernesto | 5 | Felix Coetzee | Derek Cruz | 1:47.60 |
| 2008 | Bullish Cash | 5 | Brett Prebble | Tony Cruz | 1:46.30 |
| 2009 | Jamesina | 5 | Douglas Whyte | David Ferraris | 1:48.57 |
| 2010 | Mr Medici | 5 | Ben So Tik-hung | Peter Ho Leung | 1:47.39 |
| 2011 | Sapelli | 5 | Eddy Lai Wai-ming | John Size | 1:47.27 |
| 2012 | Thumbs Up | 7 | Brett Prebble | Caspar Fownes | 1:47.43 |
| 2013 | Military Attack | 5 | Zac Purton | John Moore | 1:49.98 |
| 2014 | Bubble Chic | 6 | Karis Teetan | David Hall | 1:49.30 |
| 2015 | Harbour Master | 5 | João Moreira | John Moore | 1:47.15 |
| 2016 | Helene Paragon | 4 | João Moreira | John Moore | 1:45.83 |
| 2017 | Horse of Fortune | 6 | Callan Murray | Tony Millard | 1:48.09 |
| 2018 | Exultant | 4 | Zac Purton | Tony Cruz | 1:46.09 |
| 2019 | Rise High | 5 | Vincent Ho Chak-yiu | Caspar Fownes | 1:46.87 |
| 2020 | Dances With Dragon | 6 | Keith Yeung Ming-lun | Caspar Fownes | 1:45.84 |
| 2021 | Southern Legend | 8 | Zac Purton | Caspar Fownes | 1:46.30 |
| 2022 | Tourbillon Diamond | 5 | Alexis Badel | Danny Shum Chap-shing | 1:48.27 |
| 2023 | Tuchel | 4 | Zac Purton | John Size | 1:48.92 |
| 2024 | Galaxy Patch | 4 | Vincent Ho Chak-yiu | Pierre Ng Pang-chi | 1:48.64 |
| 2025 | Beauty Joy | 8 | Brenton Avdulla | Tony Cruz | 1:46.91 |
| 2026 | Beauty Joy | 9 | João Moreira | Tony Cruz | 1:47.96 |

== See also ==
- List of Hong Kong horse races
