= Jeffrey Lloyd =

Australian jockey

Jeff Lloyd (born 1 September 1961) is a horse racing jockey currently based in Australia.

Lloyd has ridden more than 5500 winners during his international career. He rode briefly in Hong Kong during the 1993/1994 racing season, then again in 2009-2012. In 2011 he won the Hong Kong International Mile. Lloyd has ridden winners in South Africa, Hong Kong, Singapore, and Australia, and has also ridden in the United Kingdom, Germany, Dubai, Macau, Mauritius, and New Zealand.

Lloyd holds the record for riding 3 Group One winners on a day, and has ridden 7 winners in a meeting on 4 occasions. He broke the Queensland Metropolitan and State records in the 2016/2017 racing season, and won the Australian Metropolitan Jockey premiership. He won the Queensland Jockey premiership three years in a row (2015/16, 2016/17 and 2017/18), and has won 94 races at the Group One level, hundreds of Group 2 and Group 3 races, and jockey premierships in South Africa, Mauritius and Australia. Lloyd is the oldest jockey in history to win a Jockey State premiership.

Lloyd suffered a well-documented ischemic stroke in March 2014, and made a remarkable comeback in the saddle 14 months later.

Family - Jockey sons Jaden and Zac are riding with success currently in Queensland

== Performance ==
Seasons	Total Rides	No. of Wins	No. of 2nds	No. of 3rds	No. of 4ths	Stakes won
2010/2011	453	35	33	38	44	HK$35,496,225
