= Able One =

New Zealand-bred racehorse

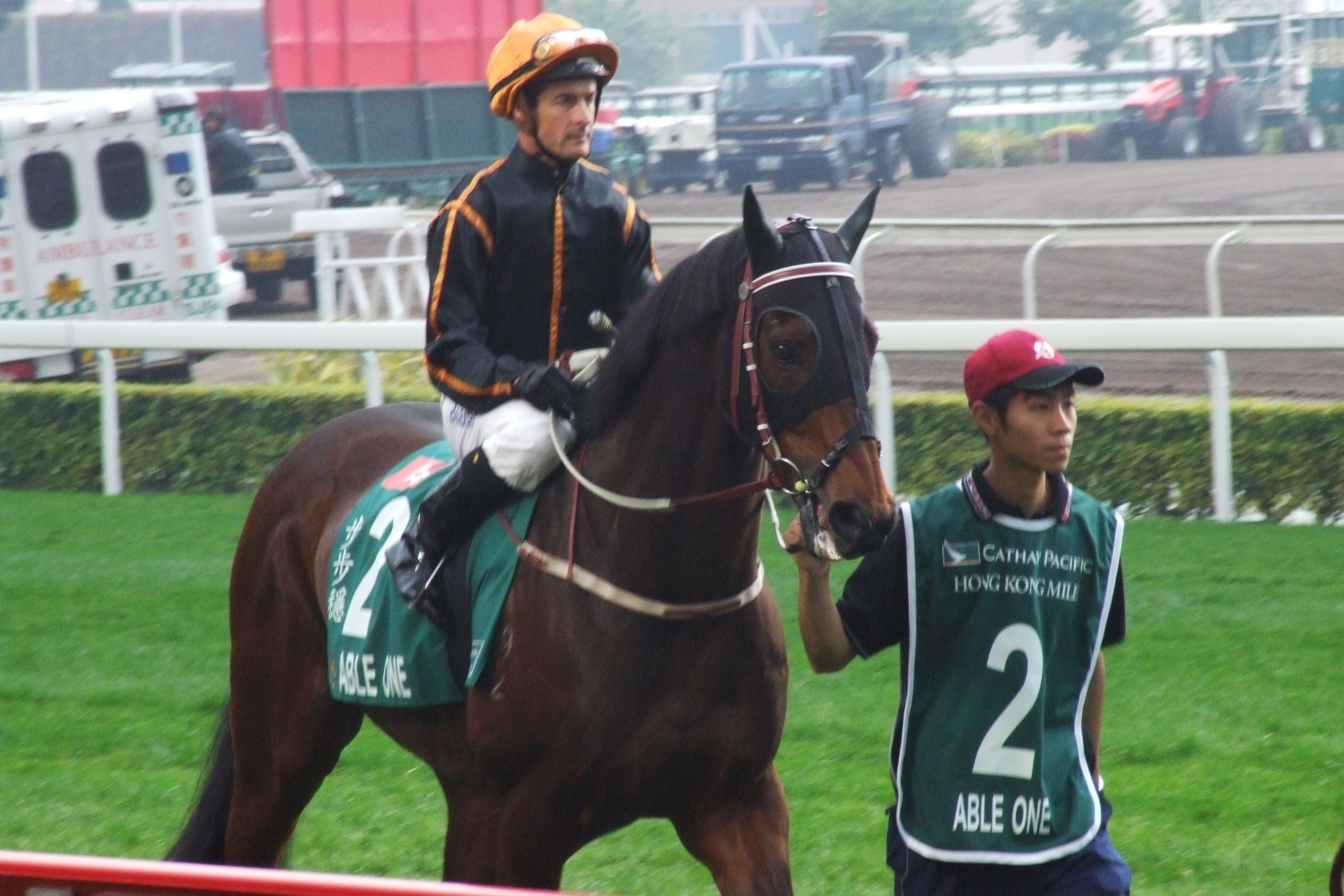
- Sire: Cape Cross
- Grandsire: Green Desert
- Dam: Gardenia
- Damsire: Danehill
- Sex: Gelding
- Foaled: 1 November 2002
- Country: New Zealand
- Colour: Bay
- Breeder: Sir Partick & Lady Hogan
- Owner: Dr & Mrs Cornel Li Fook Kwan
- Trainer: John Moore
- Record: 44:10-4-2
- Earnings: HK$37,755,000

Major wins
- Champions Mile (2007, 2010); Premier Cup (2008, 2010); Chairman's Trophy (2010); Jockey Club Mile (2010); Hong Kong Mile (2011)

Awards
- Hong Kong Champion Miler (2010)

Able One (Chinese: 步步穩; foaled 1 November 2002) is a New Zealand–bred Hong Kong–based Thoroughbred racehorse.

He raced from 2006 to 2012. In the 2009–2010 season, Able One won the HKG2 Chairman's Trophy before following up in the Champions Mile. Able One was one of the nominees of Hong Kong Horse of the Year that year.

== Background ==
Able One is a plain bay gelding bred by Sir Patrick Hogan and Lady Justine Hogan. He was sold at Karaka as a yearling before being resold by Phoenix Park at the Karaka Ready to Run sale at two, purchased by Paul Beamish for NZ$270,000.

He was sired by Cape Cross, an Irish stallion whose wins included the Lockinge Stakes, the Queen Anne Stakes, and the Celebration Mile. Other progeny of Cape Cross include Sea The Stars, Golden Horn, and Ouija Board.

His dam, Gardenia, was an unraced New Zealand based mare by Danehill (horse).

== Pedigree ==
Pedigree of Able One (NZ), brown gelding, 2002
Sire Cape Cross (IRE) 1994	Green Desert (USA); 1983	Danzig (USA)	Northern Dancer (CAN)
Sire Cape Cross (IRE) 1994	Green Desert (USA); 1983	Danzig (USA)	Pas De Nom (USA)
Sire Cape Cross (IRE) 1994	Green Desert (USA); 1983	Foreign Courier (USA)	Sir Ivor (USA)
Sire Cape Cross (IRE) 1994	Green Desert (USA); 1983	Foreign Courier (USA)	Courtly Dee (USA)
Sire Cape Cross (IRE) 1994	Park Appeal (IRE); 1982	Ahonoora (GB)	Lorenzaccio (GB)
Sire Cape Cross (IRE) 1994	Park Appeal (IRE); 1982	Ahonoora (GB)	Helen Nichols (GB)
Sire Cape Cross (IRE) 1994	Park Appeal (IRE); 1982	Balidaress (IRE)	Balidar (IRE)
Sire Cape Cross (IRE) 1994	Park Appeal (IRE); 1982	Balidaress (IRE)	Innocence (GB)
Dam Gardenia (NZ) 1995	Danehill (USA); 1986	Danzig (USA)	Northern Dancer (CAN)
Dam Gardenia (NZ) 1995	Danehill (USA); 1986	Danzig (USA)	Pas De Nom (USA)
Dam Gardenia (NZ) 1995	Danehill (USA); 1986	Razyana (USA)	His Majesty (USA)
Dam Gardenia (NZ) 1995	Danehill (USA); 1986	Razyana (USA)	Spring Adieu (CAN)
Dam Gardenia (NZ) 1995	Cladagh (AUS); 1990	Sir Tristram (IRE)	Sir Ivor (USA)
Dam Gardenia (NZ) 1995	Cladagh (AUS); 1990	Sir Tristram (IRE)	Isolt (USA)
Dam Gardenia (NZ) 1995	Cladagh (AUS); 1990	A Little Love (USA)	J. O. Tobin (USA)
Dam Gardenia (NZ) 1995	Cladagh (AUS); 1990	A Little Love (USA)	Little Happiness (USA)

- Able One is inbred 3 × 3 to Danzig, meaning that this stallion appears twice in the third generation of his pedigree. He is also inbred 4 x 4 to Sir Ivor.
