= Gary T. K. Ng =

Gary T. K. Ng (born 6 December 1952), is a horse trainer. He has been training in Hong Kong since 1990/91. In 2010/11 he trained 15 winners which pushed his career total to 417.

== Significant horses ==
- Sweet Sanette

== Performance ==
Seasons	Total Runners	No. of Wins	No. of 2nds	No. of 3rds	No. of 4ths	Stakes won
2010/2011	320	15	15	27	16	HK$11,863,525
