= Andy T. W. Leung =

Andy T. W. Leung (born 26 June 1948), is a horse trainer. He worked as an assistant trainer before being granted a full permit to train in Hong Kong starting in 1995/96. He had 17 victories in 2012/13, at the end of which season he had 403.

== Performance ==
Seasons	Total Runners	No. of Wins	No. of 2nds	No. of 3rds	No. of 4ths	Stakes won
2012/2013	230	17	14	12	16	HK$9,362,950

== See also ==
- Hong Kong Jockey Club
