= Derek K C Leung =

Hong Kong jockey

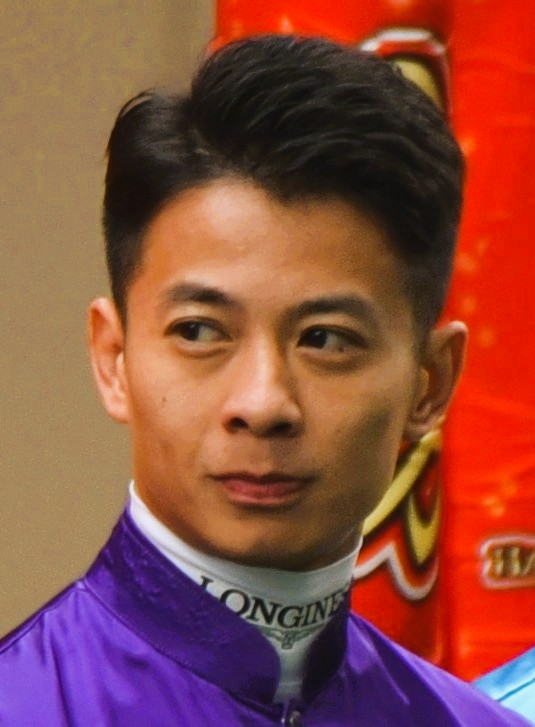
Leung in February 2026

Derek K C Leung (born 30 July 1988) is a horse racing jockey. He won the Asian Young Guns Challenge 2010 in Kranji, Singapore. He rode as an apprentice jockey until claiming his 70th win on board Star Of Fame on 1 June 2011. He is licensed as a jockey in Hong Kong for the 2014-2015 season.

== Major wins ==
- Premier Bowl - Inspiration (2009), Wishful Thinker (2020)
- Hong Kong Mile - Beauty Generation (2017)
- Hong Kong Classic Cup - Mission Tycoon (2019)
- Jockey Club Cup - Reliable Team (2021)

== Performance ==
Seasons	Total Rides	No. of Wins	No. of 2nds	No. of 3rds	No. of 4ths	Stakes won
2008/2009	386	28	34	26	35	HK$22,124,450
2009/2010	391	25	27	35	36	HK$23,965,312
2010/2011	477	25	30	37	42	HK$22,946,150
2011/2012	509	25	34	37	45	HK$25,058,937
2012/2013	456	15	30	35	28	HK$17,951,450
2013/2014	500	18	25	30	32	HK$18,682,375
2014/2015	459	26	32	35	27	HK$26,191,250
2015/2016	505	33	24	36	41	HK$36,131,482
2016/2017	464	25	36	25	29	HK$31,101,392
2017/2018	553	37	38	44	41	HK$60,011,150
2018/2019	501	26	32	42	37	HK$43,362,175
2019/2020	562	29	21	36	50	HK$37,146,565
2020/2021	609	39	41	42	52	HK$55,686,250
2021/2022	587	48	36	48	47	HK$68,965,250
2022/2023	581	36	33	38	39	HK$58,790,570
2023/2024	489	25	31	32	30	HK$51,021,650
2024/2025	447	36	38	35	39	HK$57,231,450
