= Howard Y T Cheng =

Hong Kong jockey

Howard Y T Cheng (born 18 Jul 1981) was a champion apprentice jockey in Hong Kong horse-racing in 1999/2000 and 2000/2001. He scored 40 wins in 2010/11, placing sixth in the championship table and bringing his career aggregate to 347. His one win in 2013/14 took his career tally of Hong Kong wins to 408.

== Major wins ==
- HKG3 Premier Bowl - Cerise Cherry (2011)

== Performance ==
Seasons	Total Rides	No. of Wins	No. of 2nds	No. of 3rds	No. of 4ths	Stakes won
2010/2011	539	40	36	39	30	HK$31,472,350
