= Manfred K. L. Man =

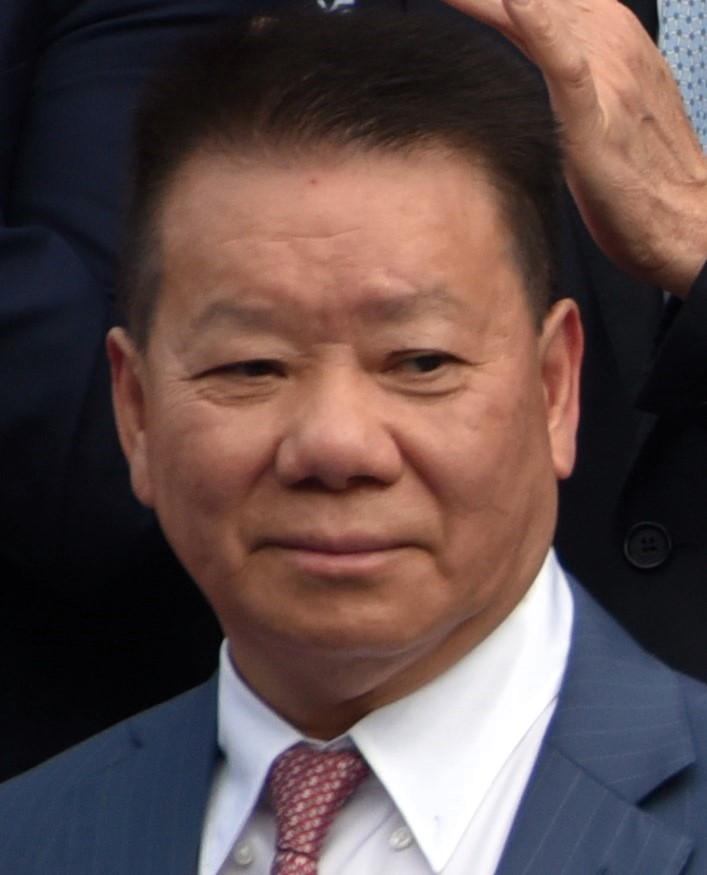
Man won the Hong Kong Sprint 2023 as a horse trainer with Lucky Sweynesse on 10 December 2023

Manfred K. L. Man (Chinese: 文家良; born July 18, 1957) was a jockey between 1976 and 1977. He began training horses in 2001. Man won 35 races in the 2010/11 season for an overall total of 262.

== Significant horses ==
- London China Town
- Tai Sing Yeh

== Performance ==
Seasons	Total Runners	No. of Wins	No. of 2nds	No. of 3rds	No. of 4ths	Stakes won
2010/2011	435	35	34	29	38	HK$28,195,200
