= Dennis C. H. Yip =

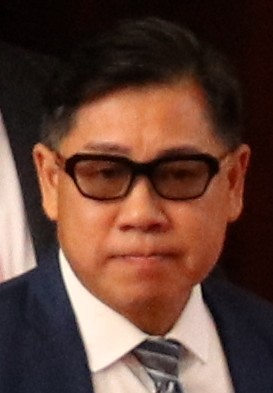
Yip in 2025

Dennis Yip Chor-hong (born 28 Jul 1967) rode a total of 59 winners when he was a jockey between 1984 and 1993. In 2002-03, he became a licensed trainer. Yip trained over 30 winners in every year of his nine-year training career, landing 41 winners in 2010/11 for an overall total of 368.

== Performance ==
Seasons	Total Runners	No. of Wins	No. of 2nds	No. of 3rds	No. of 4ths	Stakes won
2010/2011	581	41	60	47	38	HK$35,455,395
