= Peter B. K. Ng =

Hong Kong racehorse trainer

Peter B. K. Ng (born 27 August 1947) is currently the longest serving horse trainer in Hong Kong. He takes out his own licence in 1983/84. He trained 17 winners in 2010/11 for an overall total of 402.

== Significant horses ==
- Mystic
- Quicken Away
- Reliable Source

== Performance ==
Seasons	Total Runners	No. of Wins	No. of 2nds	No. of 3rds	No. of 4ths	Stakes won
2010/2011	217	17	22	16	17	HK$10,970,575
