= Matthew Chadwick =

Hong Kong jockey

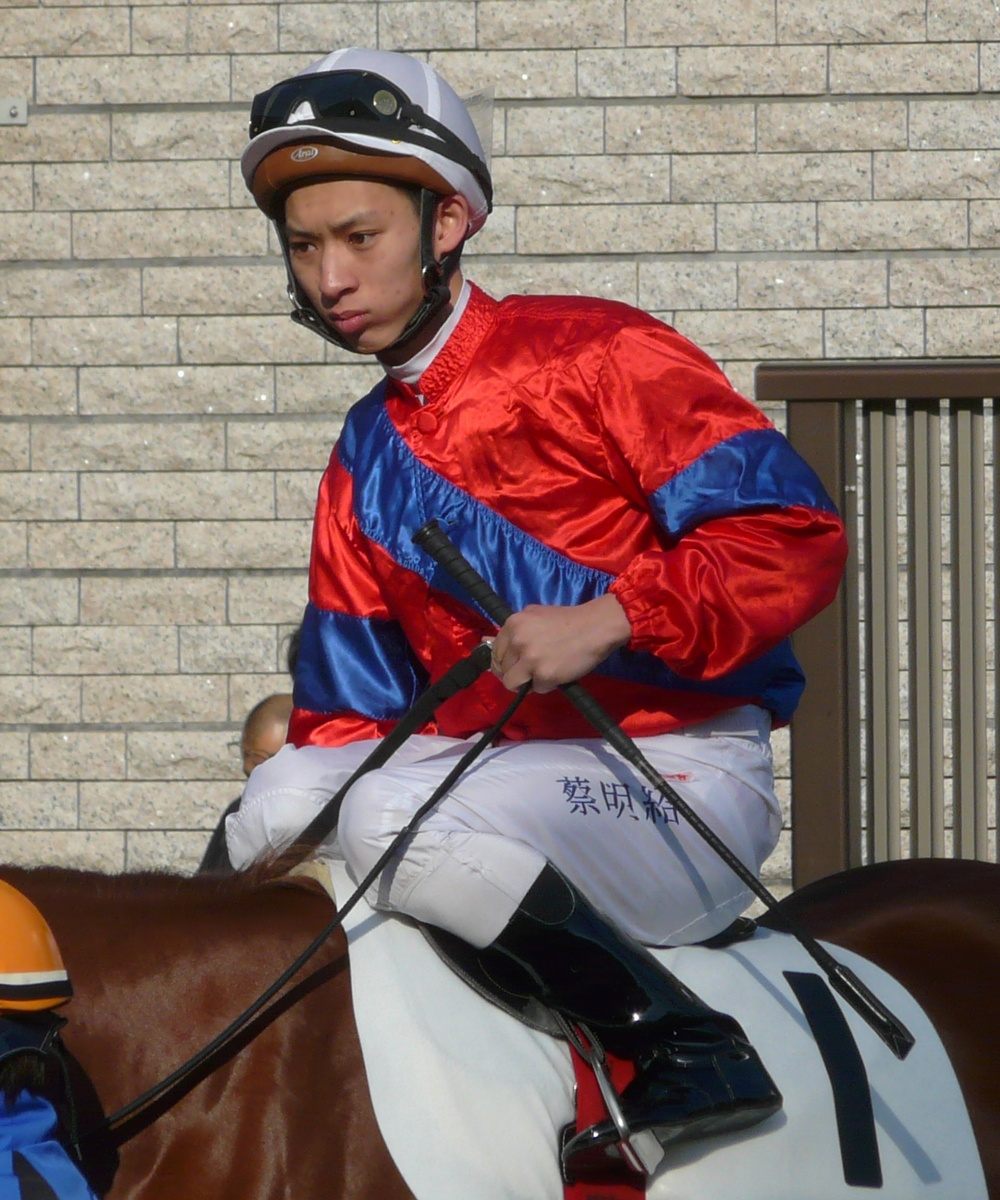
Matthew Chadwick

Matthew Chadwick (born 12 Jul 1990) is a horse racing jockey in Hong Kong. He was champion apprentice in 2008/09. He ranked fourth in the jockeys' premiership in 2009/10 although he became a fully fledged jockey in mid season. By the end of 2010/11, Chadwick had had 134 wins. He notched his 250th win in Hong Kong with Majestic Anthem on 26 December 2013 and rode his first Hong Kong four-timer at Sha Tin on 22 June 2014.

== Significant horses ==
- Egyptian Ra
- California Memory

== Performance ==
Seasons	Total Rides	No. of Wins	No. of 2nds	No. of 3rds	No. of 4ths	Stakes won
2008/2009	281	43	33	26	31	HK$30,907,500
2009/2010	485	48	38	40	46	HK$41,717,487
2010/2011	438	43	28	41	37	HK$41,449,875
2011/2012	491	44	46	48	31	HK$52,380,337
2012/2013	484	57	41	40	39	HK$69,928,500
2013/2014	494	38	35	34	43	HK$37,834,875
2014/2015	386	16	33	20	34	HK$23,983,962
2015/2016	285	12	17	17	22	HK$17,407,000
2016/2017	302	9	21	22	22	HK$18,403,225
2017/2018	386	19	32	20	35	HK$28,801,650
2018/2019	482	22	38	44	35	HK$35,920,975
2019/2020	510	24	41	42	33	HK$48,535,922.50
2020/2021	458	31	24	35	41	HK$49,846,000
2021/2022	628	55	55	53	64	HK$87,606,100
2022/2023	557	43	44	45	37	HK$68,452,657.50
2023/2024	518	26	43	41	41	HK$49,008,750
2024/2025	576	35	41	51	38	HK$63,578,738
