= Sha Tin Racecourse =

Racecourse in Hong Kong

Coordinates: 22°23′58″N 114°12′24″E

Sha Tin Racecourse 沙田馬場
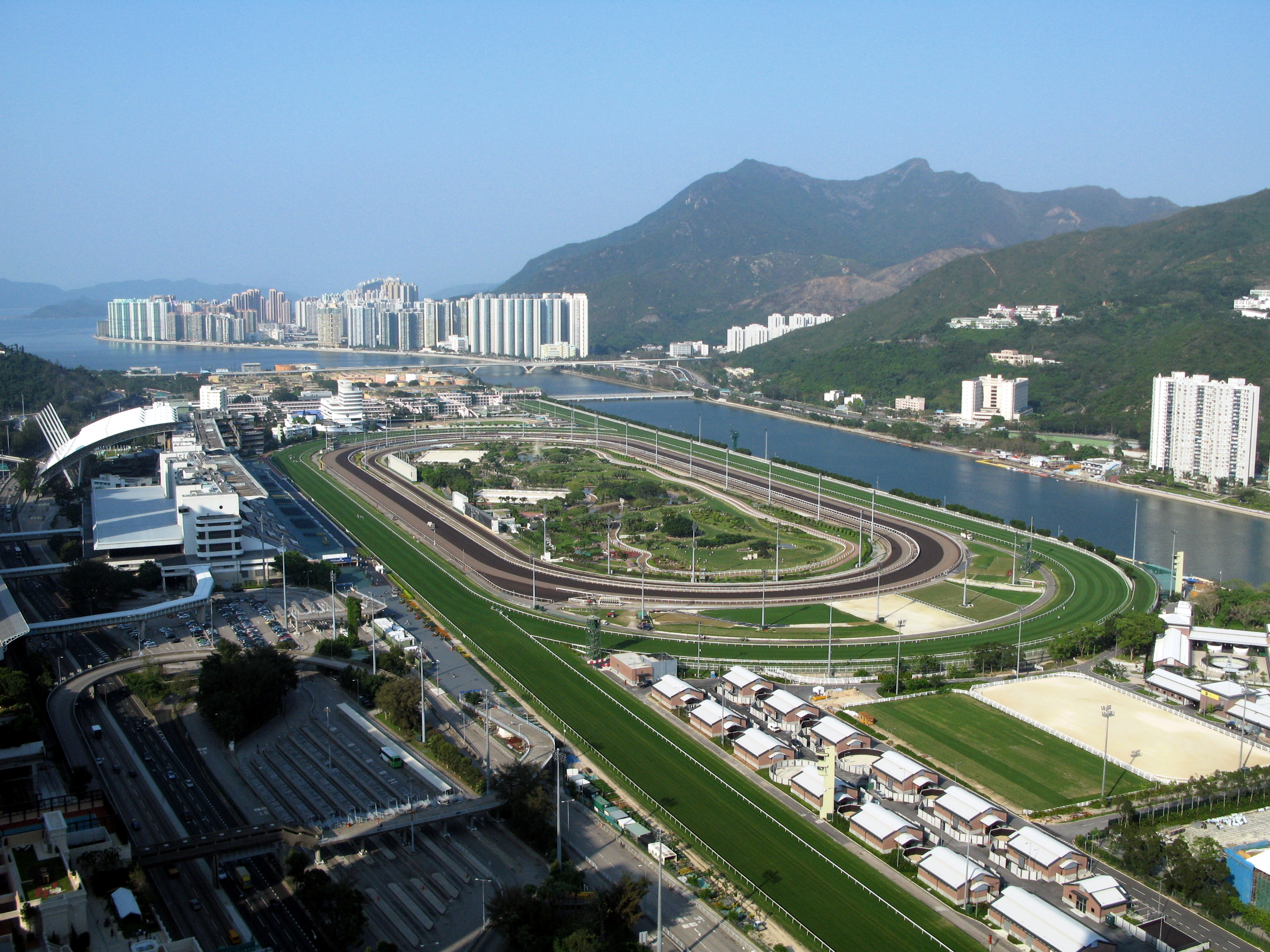
- Overview of Sha Tin Racecourse
- Interactive map of Sha Tin Racecourse 沙田馬場
- Location: Sha Tin District, Hong Kong
- Owned by: Hong Kong Jockey Club
- Date opened: 7 October 1978; 47 years ago
- Capacity: 85,000
- Course type: Thoroughbred
- Notable races: Group One races: Hong Kong Derby; Queen Elizabeth II Cup; Champions Mile; Hong Kong International Races; Hong Kong Triple Crown

Sha Tin Racecourse
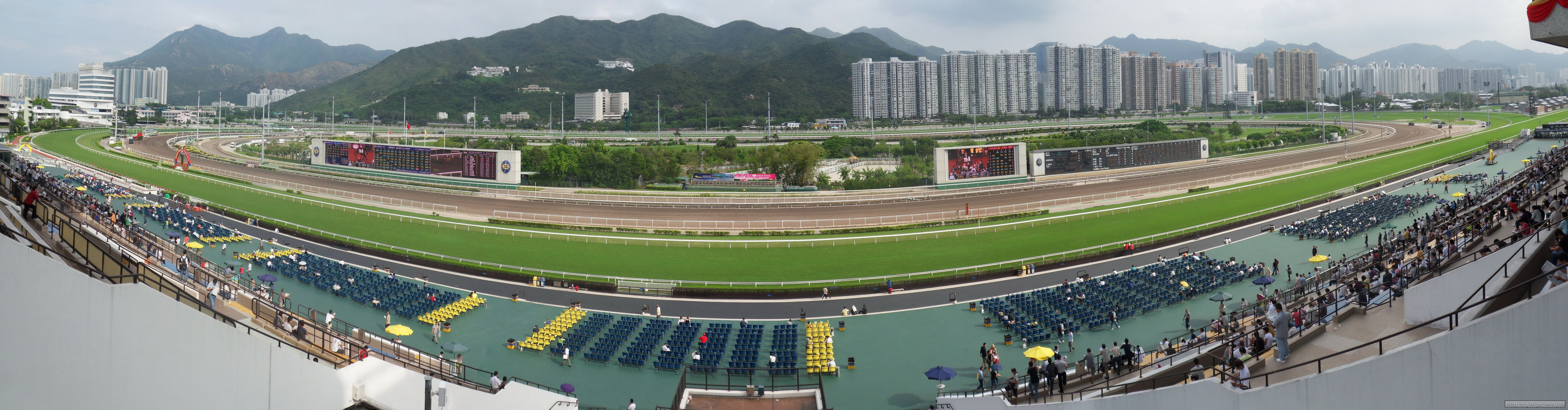
- Southeast Panorama over the Sha Tin horse race course in October 2009
- Traditional Chinese: 沙田馬場
- Simplified Chinese: 沙田马场
Transcriptions
Standard Mandarin
- Hanyu Pinyin: Shātián Mǎchǎng
- Yale Romanization: Shātyán mǎchǎng
- IPA: [ʂátʰjɛ̌n màʈʂʰàŋ]
Yue: Cantonese
- Yale Romanization: Sā tìhn máh cheùhng
- Jyutping: Saa1 tin4 maa5 coeng4
- IPA: [sáː tʰɪ̏n ma̬ː tsʰœ̏ŋ]

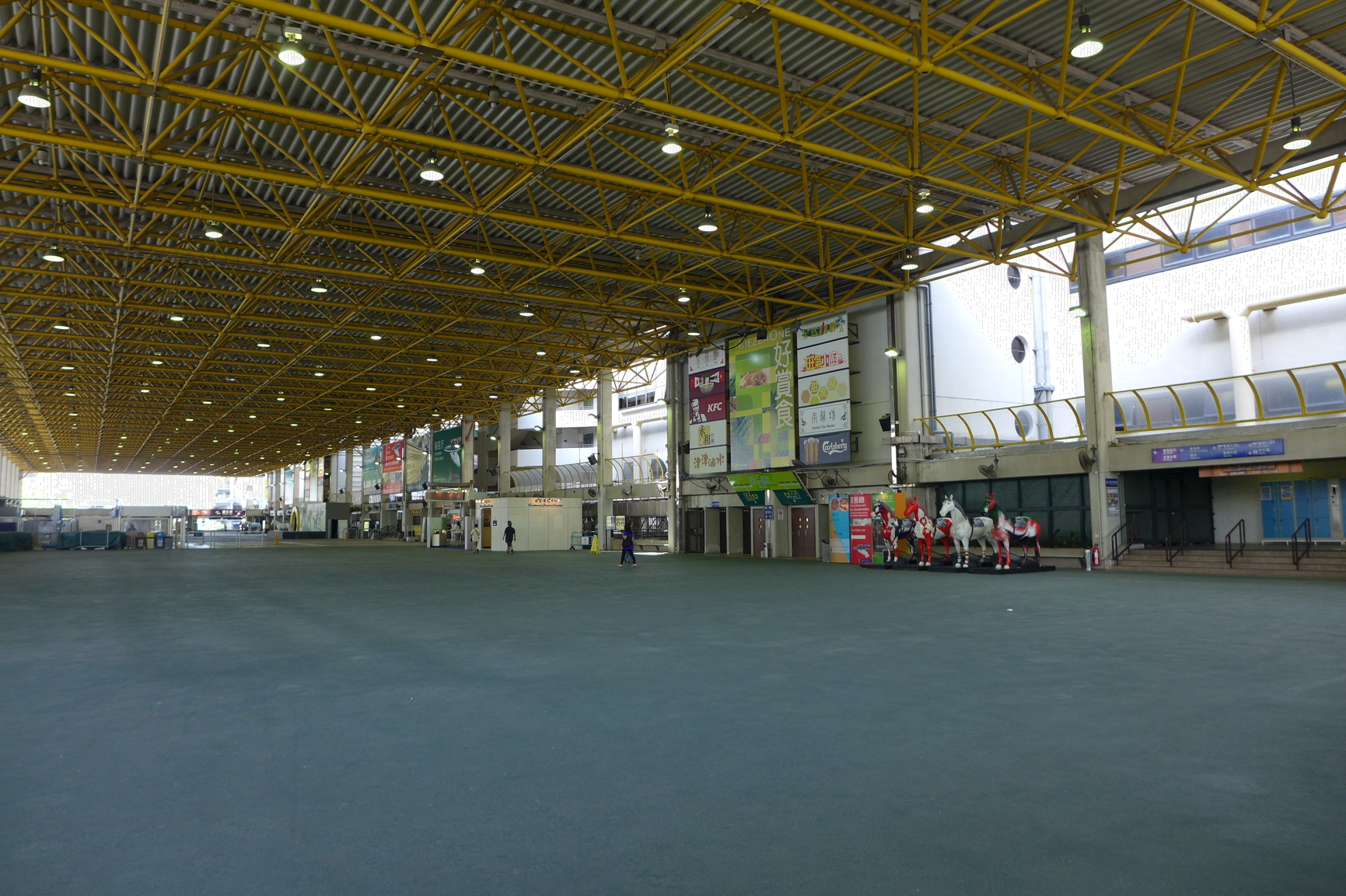
Racecourse Concourse

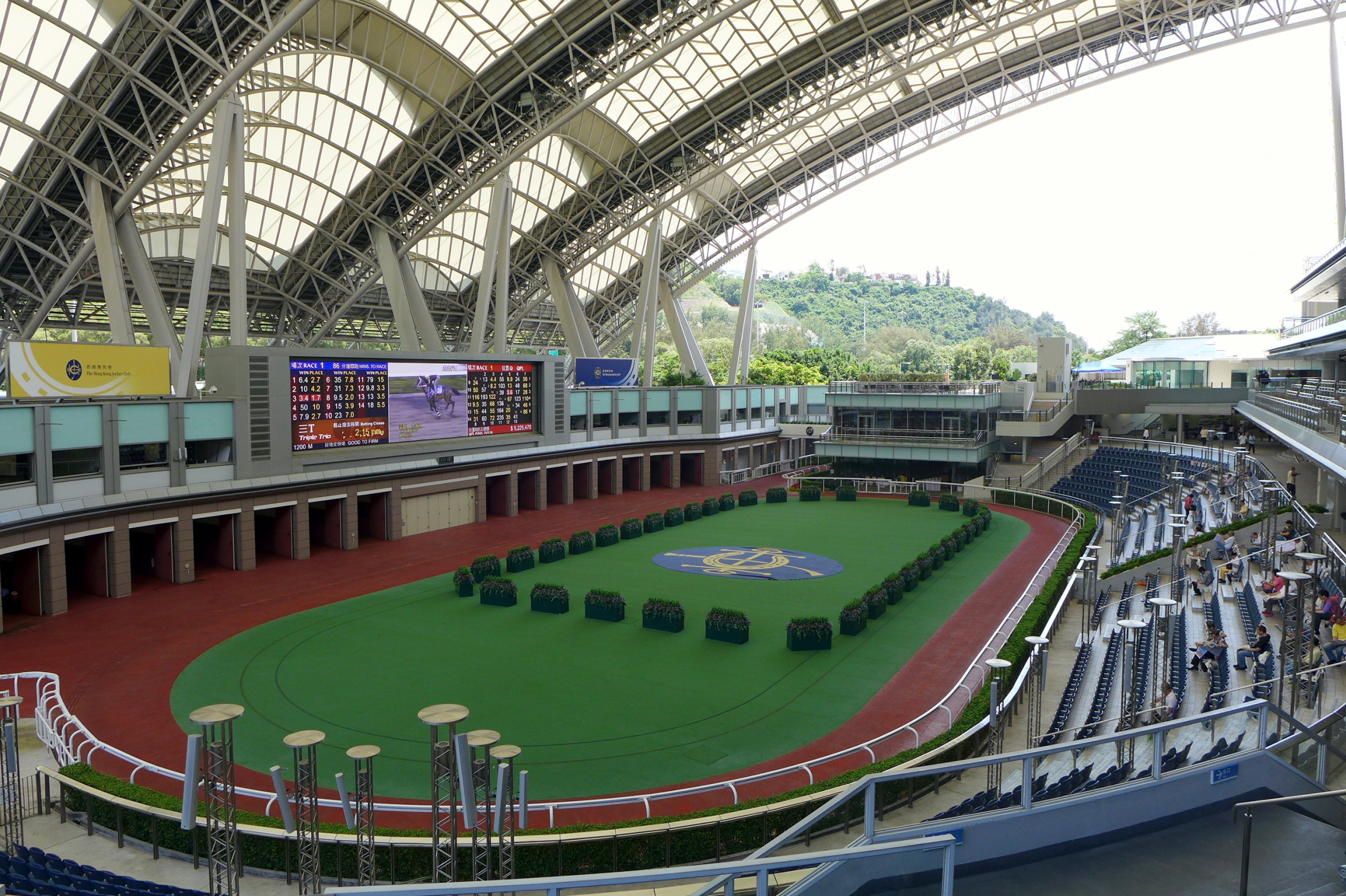
Covered Parade Ring

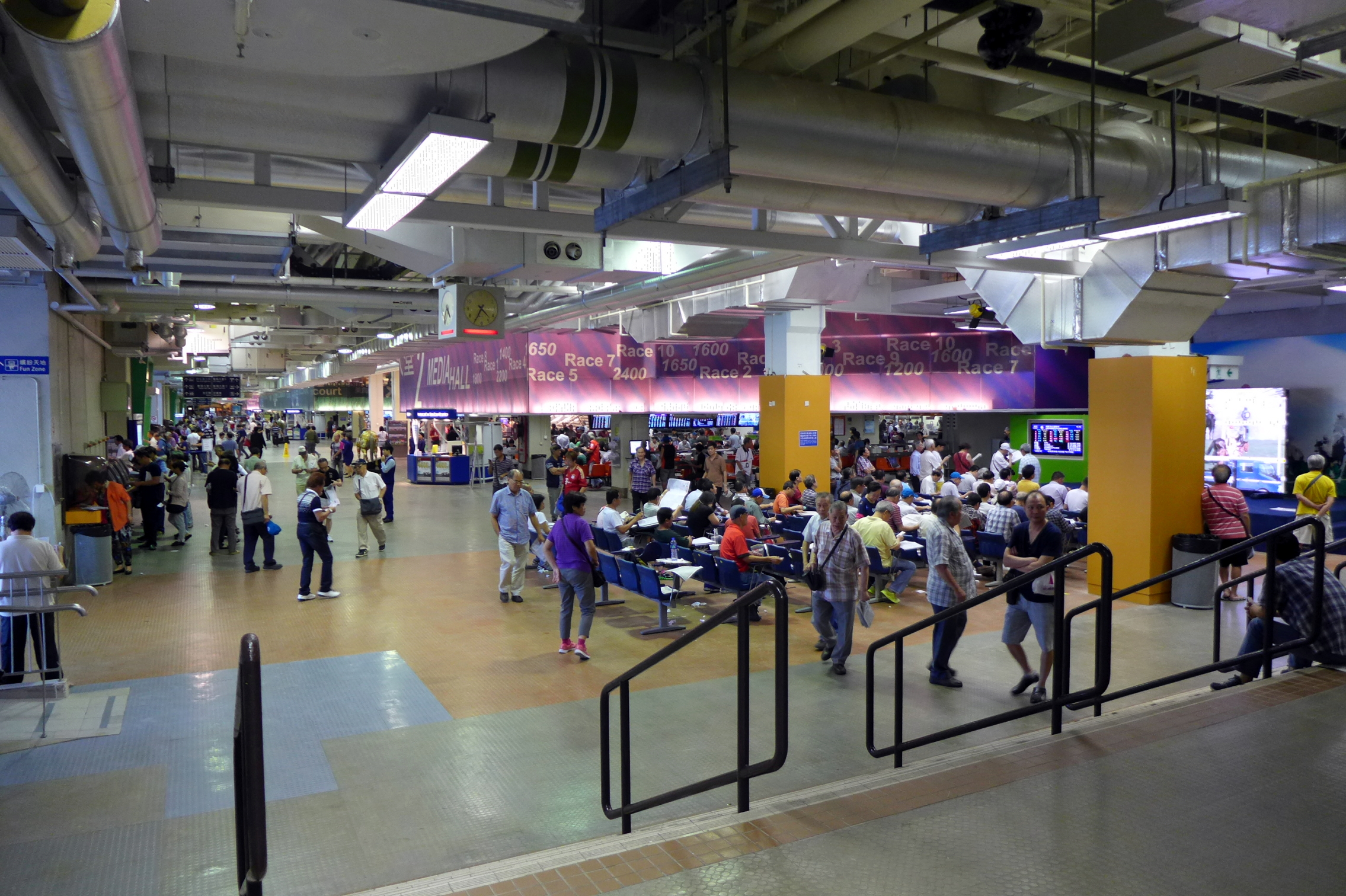
Public Betting Hall at Level 1

Sha Tin Racecourse is one of the two racecourses for horse racing in Hong Kong. It is located in Sha Tin in the New Territories. It is managed by Hong Kong Jockey Club.

Penfold Park is encircled by the track, and the Hong Kong Sports Institute is located immediately south of the property.

== History ==
The racecourse was built in 1978 (under the administration of Sir David Akers-Jones, the then-Secretary for the New Territories) on reclaimed land and is the larger of the two tracks in Hong Kong.

The course has 474 races per season including:

- Hong Kong Cup
- Hong Kong Mile
- Hong Kong Sprint
- Hong Kong Vase
- Centenary Sprint Cup
- Hong Kong Stewards' Cup
- Queen's Silver Jubilee Cup
- Hong Kong Gold Cup
- Hong Kong Derby
- Queen Elizabeth II Cup
- Champions Mile
- Chairman's Sprint Prize
- Hong Kong Champions & Chater Cup

On 9 September 2007, the Sha Tin track opened for the 2007 season with an opening day record of about 60,000. Chief Secretary Henry Tang struck the ceremonial gong. The Hong Kong Jockey Club collected US$106 million in bets (the highest since 2001). Children of horse owners were admitted amid protest of local anti-gambling groups. Sunny Power, booted by Howard Cheng won in the 1,200 metre dash.

== Features ==
Originally built with a 35,000-capacity grandstand, it now has two grandstands with a total capacity of 85,000. It also has 20 stables for a capacity of 1,260 horses.

Other features include:

- Equine Hospital
- Racing Laboratory
- Equine Swimming Pool
- Riverside Gallop

Track Specifications:

- Turf
  - Straight: 430 metres (470 yd)
  - Circumference: 1.899 kilometres (1.180 mi)
- All-Weather Track (Dirt)
  - Straight: 380 metres (420 yd)
  - Circumference: 1.560 kilometres (0.969 mi)

== Major races ==
Group One

- Hong Kong International Races (December)
  - Hong Kong Cup - 2000m
  - Hong Kong Mile - 1600m
  - Hong Kong Sprint - 1200m
  - Hong Kong Vase - 2400m
- Hong Kong Triple Crown
  - Hong Kong Stewards' Cup - 1600m (January)
  - Hong Kong Gold Cup - 2000m (February)
  - Hong Kong Champions & Chater Cup - 2400m (May)
- Centenary Sprint Cup - 1200m (January)
- Queen's Silver Jubilee Cup - 1400m (February)
- Queen Elizabeth II Cup - 2000m (April)
- Champions Mile - 1600m (April)
- Chairman's Sprint Prize - 1200m (April)

Group Two

- Premier Bowl - 1200m (October)
- Sha Tin Trophy - 1600m (October)
- Jockey Club Day (November)
  - Jockey Club Cup (Hong Kong) - 2000m
  - Jockey Club Mile - 1600m
  - Jockey Club Sprint - 1200m
- Chairman's Trophy - 1600m (April)
- Sprint Cup - 1200m (April)

Group Three

- Celebration Cup - 1400m (October)
- National Day Cup - 1000m (October)
- Ladies' Purse - 1800m (November)
- Chinese Club Challenge Cup - 1400m (January)
- Bauhinia Sprint Trophy - 1000m (January)
- Centenary Vase - 1600m (February)
- Queen Mother Memorial Cup - 2400m (May)
- Sha Tin Vase - 1200m (May)
- Lion Rock Trophy - 1600m (May)
- Premier Cup - 1400m (June)
- Premier Plate - 1800m (June)

Listed Race

- Four-year-old Series (4YO Classic Series)
  - Hong Kong Classic Mile - 1600m (January)
  - Hong Kong Classic Cup - 1800m (February)
  - Hong Kong Derby - 2000m (March; since 1979)

== Transport ==
The racecourse is served by Racecourse station of the Mass Transit Railway (MTR). The station is only used on racing days. There are also several bus routes. One of the racecourse bus routes, KMB 872, had a deadly bus crash.

== See also ==
- Happy Valley Racecourse
