= Frankie Lor =

Hong Kong horse racing trainer and jockey

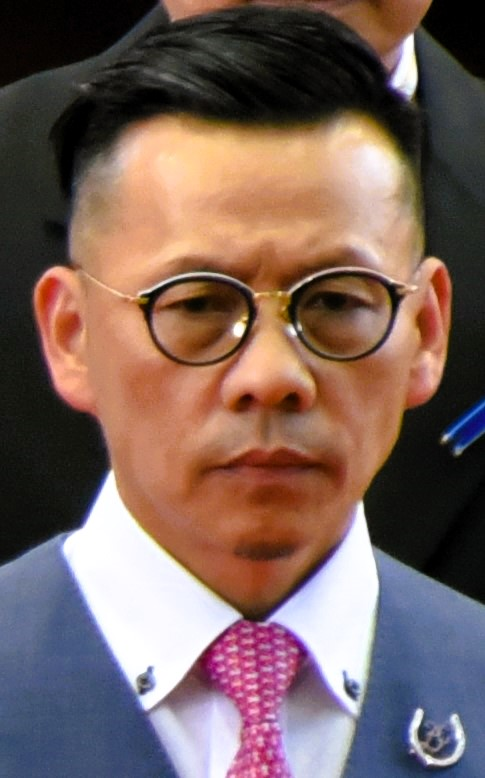
Lor in 2023

Frankie Lor Fu-chuen (Chinese: 羅富全) is a Hong Kong horse racing trainer and former jockey.

== Career ==
=== As jockey ===
Lor began his racing career as a jockey. He won 27 races between 1981 and 1995. He became work rider and later assistant to various trainers, among them John Moore and John Size.

=== As Trainer ===
Frankie Lor got his licence as a trainer in 2017. The end of his first training season (2017–2018) saw him in second place in the trainer's championship. At 17 March 2019, Lor won the Hong Kong Derby with Furore and so became the first Chinese trainer to win the Derby since 2001.
