= João Moreira (jockey) =

Brazilian jockey

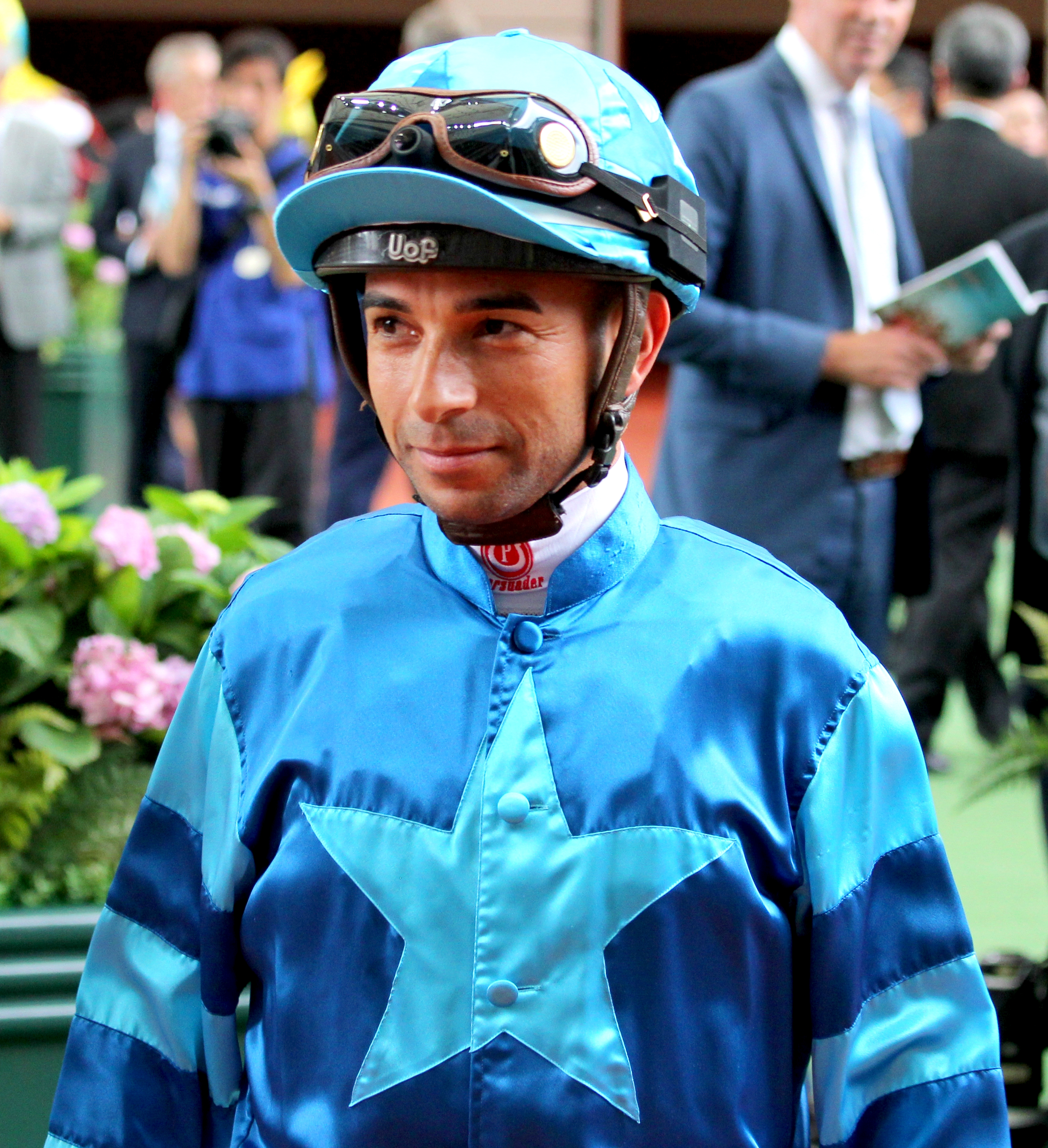
- Moreira in 2023

Personal information
- Nicknames: Magic Man, Fantasma
- Born: September 26, 1983 (age 43) Curitiba, Brazil
- Occupation: Jockey

Horse racing career
- Sport: Horse racing
- Career wins: over 1200

Significant horses
- Able Friend, Brazen Beau, Rapper Dragon,

João Moreira (born September 26, 1983), is a Brazilian jockey with extensive experience riding in Singapore, Hong Kong, Australia, and Japan. In 2017, Andrew Harding of the Hong Kong Jockey Club described him by saying, "You would have to say he was one of Brazil's greatest sporting exports. Joao is becoming to global racing what Pele or Ronaldo are to football."

== Early years ==
João Henrique Almansa Moreira grew up in Curitiba, Brazil in the poor neighborhood of Pinhais. He was the youngest of eight children. His family was very poor, and his father died of stomach cancer when Moreira was seven. They lived in a small shack, and at one point he got a job as a stablehand. He was first recruited by a gang when he was eight, and he associated with gangs until he was 14, when his older brother helped him get out of that world, finding him a job at a furniture factory. Moreira explained in 2017, "I tell young people that I stumbled when I was that young, I got in with this crowd, but thank goodness I have someone who came into my life and showed me the way out." After becoming successful as a jockey, Moreira bought his widowed mother a house.

He loved horses from an early age and was also fascinated by the underground world of two-horse match races in the area where he lived. Moreira said in a 2016 interview, "I was pretty wild when I was young and I used to jump out the window late at night and go to the neighbour's farm and ride their horses. During the night the owners of the horses were sleeping so that was the only time I could ride them. If I hadn't done that, I never would have fallen in love with horses and who knows what I would be doing today?" When he gained admittance to the jockeys' academy in Sao Paulo, Brazil, he left Curitiba and began riding professionally. During his training at the academy, he lacked 2 of the required 6 wins in the first 6 months in order to continue at the school. In the final weekend before the deadline, he narrowly won the required races, keeping his spot in the school. At age 16, he sought out the mentorship of Brazilian trainer Ivan Quintana, marking a turning point in his development as a jockey.

Moreira developed a distinctive riding style, using a slightly longer stirrup and shorter rein that requires him to crouch lower on the horse while riding. Some consider it the key to his success.

== Career ==
Moreira began his career in the 2005/06 season in Brazil as an apprentice jockey.

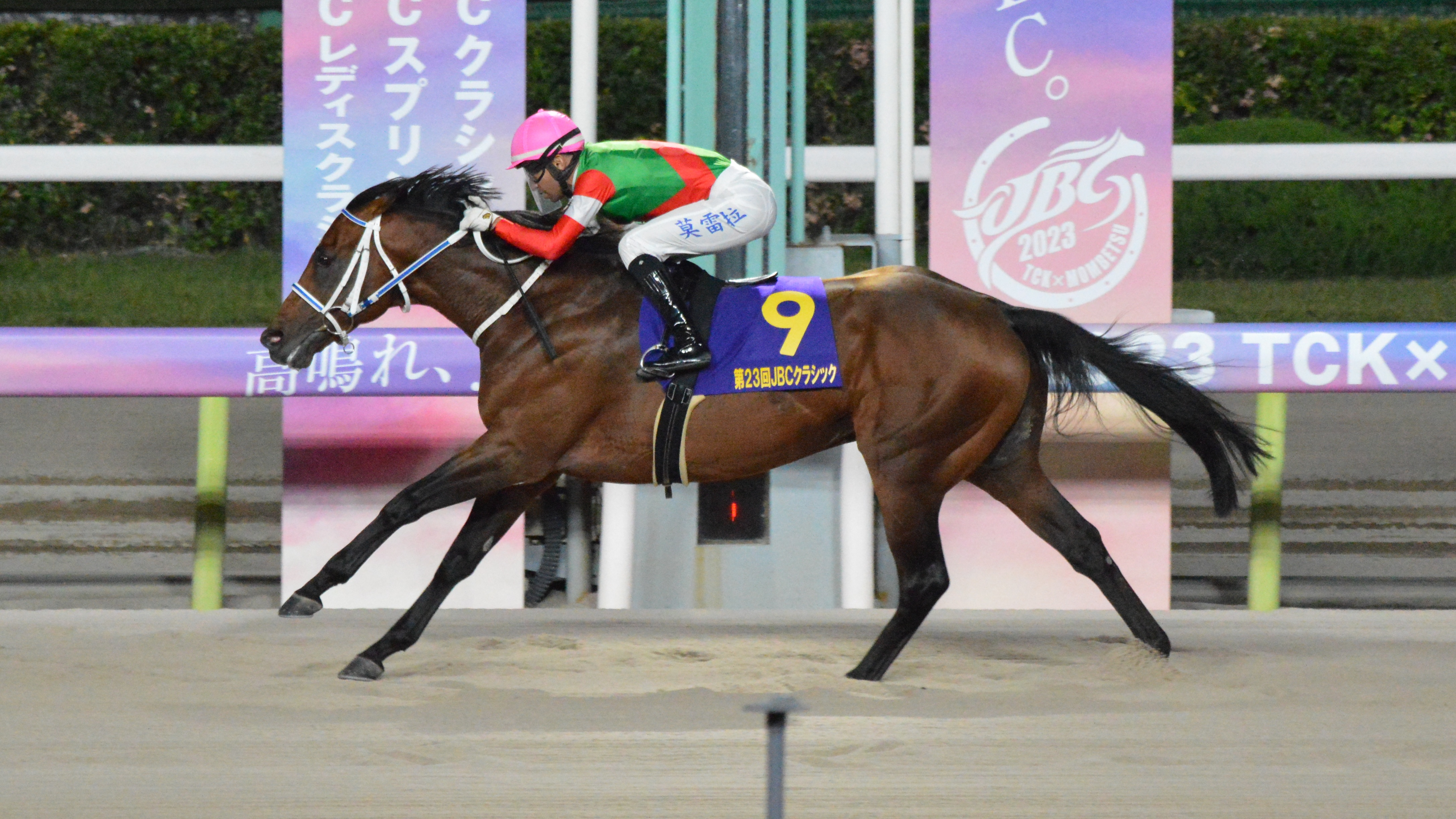
Moreira riding in Japan in 2023

During his early career years in Singapore, he was given his nickname "Magic Man" by the track announcer Craig Evans because of Moreira's ability to get horses to perform far better than expected. He is also known as "Fantasma" or "Fantasma de Cidade Jardim" ("Ghost of Cidade Jardim") in Brazil.

He has had at least three eight-win race days in his career. The first was at Hipódromo Cidade Jardim, Sao Paulo, Brazil, in 2008. One of the better-known was eight winners from eight rides on the nine-event card on Friday September 6, 2013, at Kranji race course in Singapore. The third was at Sha Tin Racecourse on March 5, 2017, breaking the previous Hong Kong jockey record of six.

In 2013, a pivotal moment in his career arrived. While riding in Singapore, he was spotted by American trainer Wesley Ward, who suggested he come to the US. About the same time, he received offers to ride in Hong Kong, and decided to go there instead, as he was already based in Asia.

He moved to Hong Kong in October 2013. In 2018, he attempted to move to Japan, but could not obtain a full-time licence to ride there because he could not pass the difficult test on Japanese racing history, rules and general facts. When he rode races in Japan later, he qualified for short-term contracts of up to three months because of his successes elsewhere in the world.

By the end of 2022, Moreira had ridden 1,234 winners, placing him third all-time in career victories in Hong Kong. In November 2022, after a decade of riding in Hong Kong, he announced his retirement due to struggles with both his physical and mental health. He pointed to struggles related to restrictions on jockeys linked to the COVID-19 pandemic and having moved his family back to Brazil. He also had not ridden since September 2022 due to problems with his left hip, with therapy yet to be successful. He relinquished his Hong Kong license in December 2022.

Moreira returned to his home in Curitiba, Brazil. After Brazilian doctors provided successful treatment for his hip injury, he began riding races again. He rode in Australia for about six weeks in early 2023, then returned to Brazil, winning 131 races, including the 2023 Grande Premio Brasil. He returned to Australia again later in the year. Moreira has been named the Champion Jockey in Brazil four times, in 2006/07, 2007/08, 2022/23, and 2023/24.

He then came to Japan and qualified to ride there for three months during the 2024 season. He then returned to Australia in September, 2024. Moreira has also ridden in Saudi Arabia, and Dubai.

In 2014, he was described as "one of the greatest jockeys in the world," but was not well known in the United States. He spent a very brief time in the US, riding a total of 17 races at Arlington Park, Calder Race Course, Gulfstream Park and at Churchill Downs in 2013, winning two. He returned to Kentucky in 2025, where he rode for the first time in the Kentucky Derby in 2025 at age 41 aboard Fukuryu Stakes winner Luxor Cafe.

As of 2025, he lives in Curitiba with his family. He takes short contracts in Japan and Australia, and when there are major races, flies to Hong Kong, Dubai, Saudi Arabia, and elsewhere.

== Major wins ==
United Arab Emirates

- Dubai Golden Shaheen - (1) - Sterling City (2014)
- Al Quoz Sprint - (1) - Amber Sky (2014)
- Dubai Turf - (1) - Vivlos (2017)

Australia

- Champagne Stakes - (1) - Militarize (2023)
- Coolmore Classic - (1) - Brazen Beau (2014)
- Golden Rose Stakes - (1) - Militarize (2023)
- Newmarket Handicap - (1) - Brazen Beau (2015)
- Oakleigh Plate - (1) - Sheidel (2017)
- Sires' Produce Stakes - (1) - Militarize (2023)
- Underwood Stakes - (1) - Buckaroo (2024)

Hong Kong

- Hong Kong Mile - (1) - Able Friend (2014)
- Hong Kong Cup - (1) - Designs on Rome (2014)
- Hong Kong Sprint - (2) - Peniaphobia (2015), Beat The Clock (2019)
- Hong Kong Vase - (3) - Satono Crown (2016), Glory Vase (2019, 2021)
- Champions Mile - (2) - Able Friend (2015), Maurice (2016)
- Hong Kong Derby - (2) - Rapper Dragon (2017), Sky Darci (2021)
- Hong Kong Stewards' Cup - (2) - Able Friend (2015), Waikuku (2020)
- Hong Kong Gold Cup - (3) - Military Attack (2014), Designs on Rome (2015), Time Warp (2020)
- Hong Kong Classic Mile - (2) - Able Friend (2014), Rapper Dragon (2017)
- Hong Kong Classic Cup - (1) - Rapper Dragon (2017)
- Centenary Sprint Cup - (4) - Amber Sky (2014), Beat The Clock (2019, 2020), Hot King Prawn (2021)
- Chairman's Sprint Prize - (1) - Beat The Clock (2019)
- Queen Elizabeth II Cup - (1) - Neorealism (2017)
- Queen's Silver Jubilee Cup - (2) - Able Friend (2015), Waikuku (2021)

Japan

- Queen Elizabeth II Commemorative Cup - (1) - Lys Gracieux (2018)
- Oka Sho - (2) - Stellenbosch (2024), Embroidery (2025)
- Satsuki Sho - (1) - Museum Mile (2025)
- Takamatsunomiya Kinen - (1) - Satono Reve (2025)
- Fukuryu Stakes - (1) - Luxor Cafe (2025)

Argentina

- Gran Premio Nacional - (1) - Eu Também (2006)
- Gran Premio Carlos Pellegrini - (1) - Obataye (2025)

Brazil

- Grande Prêmio Brasil - (2) - Raptor's (2023), Obataye (2024)
- Gran Premio Latinoamericano - (1) - Obataye (2025)
- Grande Prêmio Roberto e Nelson Seabra - (1) - Kenlova (2023)
- Grande Prêmio Estado do Rio de Janeiro - (1) - Monanfan (2024)
- Grande Prêmio Francisco Eduardo e Linneo Eduardo de Paula Machado - (1) - Quantify (2023)
- Grande Prêmio Diana - (2) - Bubbly Jane (2008), Presente (2009)
- Grande Prêmio Henrique de Toledo Lara - (2) - Bubbly Jane (2008), Taylor do Iguassu (2026)
- Grande Prêmio Ipiranga - (1) - Star do Iguassu (2025)
- Grande Prêmio Jockey Club de São Paulo - (1) - Talento do Iguassu (2026)
- Grande Prêmio Presidente da República - (1) - Uigur (2008)
- Grande Prêmio OSAF - (2) - Kenlova (2023), Biarritz (2024)
- Grande Prêmio Juliano Martins - (1) - Fígaro (2023)
- Grande Prêmio Matias Machline - (2) - Obataye (2025), Summer do Iguassu (2026)
- Grande Prêmio Margarida Polak Lara - (1) - Special do Iguassu (2025)
- Grande Prêmio ABCPCC - (1) - Oriana do Iguassu (2023)

Uruguay

- Gran Premio Ciudad de Montevideo - (1) - Pacholli (2024)
- Gran Premio José Pedro Ramirez - (1) - Native Extreme (2026)

== Performance at the Hong Kong Jockey Club ==
Seasons	Total Rides	No. of Wins	No. of 2nds	No. of 3rds	No. of 4ths	Stakes won
2013/2014	478	97	71	59	51	HK$99,347,312
2014/2015	595	145	89	64	71	HK$173,715,365
2015/2016	664	168	105	101	61	HK$178,829,947
2016/2017	711	170	104	84	78	HK$207,249,728
2017/2018	660	134	98	76	74	HK$162,786,520
2018/2019	495	90	75	54	45	HK$132,239,825
2019/2020	719	138	123	91	68	HK$206,911,365.50
2020/2021	742	157	103	93	76	HK$215,300,250
2021/2022	694	132	103	69	76	HK$182,602,240

== Personal life ==
Moreira is married to Taciana, who is also from Brazil. The couple have three children: one son named Miguel, another named Murilo and a daughter named Marina.

Outside of horse racing, Moreira is a passionate fan of football. During his time riding in Hong Kong, he frequently attended Hong Kong Premier League matches and was known as an avid football enthusiast.
