= Turf Club =

Turf Club may refer to:

- Turf Club (gentlemen's club), a club in London, UK
- Turf Club, Gauteng, a suburb of Johannesburg, South Africa
- Turf Club (Saint Paul), a live music venue and restaurant in Saint Paul, Minnesota, U.S.
- Turf Club (New Jersey), a live music venue in Asbury Park, New Jersey

== Horse racing clubs ==
- Penang Turf Club in Penang, Malaysia
- Perak Turf Club in Perak, Malaysia
- Pony Turf Club, a regulating body in the United Kingdom from 1923 to the early 1950s
- Royal Calcutta Turf Club
- Royal Western India Turf Club, Mumbai
- Selangor Turf Club in Selangor, Malaysia
- Singapore Turf Club
- Turf Club (Ireland), regulatory body for horse racing in Ireland

=== Australia ===
- Australian Turf Club, Sydney
- Gold Coast Turf Club, Surfers Paradise, Queensland
- Lismore Turf Club, Lismore, New South Wales
- Melbourne Racing Club
- Queensland Turf Club, Ascot, Queensland
- Sydney Turf Club
- Western Australian Turf Club, Perth
