= Turves =

Turves may be:

- the plural of turf
- Turves, Cambridgeshire, a village in England

== See also ==
- Turves Green, an area in Birmingham, England
