= Penang Turf Club =

Defunct race track in the Malaysian state of Penang

- Kelab Lumba Kuda Pulau Pinang
- The Penang Turf Club logo consists of interlaced red letter P, white letter T and blue letter C, with the letter C resembles a horse shoe.
- Abbreviation: PTC, KLKPP
- Established: 1864
- Type: Nonprofit
- Legal status: Corporate trust
- Headquarters: Batu Gantong Road, George Town, Penang, Malaysia
- Region served: Penang
- Official language: English (main)
- President: Ong Eng Khuan
- General Manager and Secretary: Leow Khin Ming
- Financial Controller: Ang Kar Boo
- Assistant Secretary: Goh Su Yen
- Affiliations: Malayan Racing Association (1896–2025)
- Website: www.penangturfclub.com

Batu Gantong Racecourse
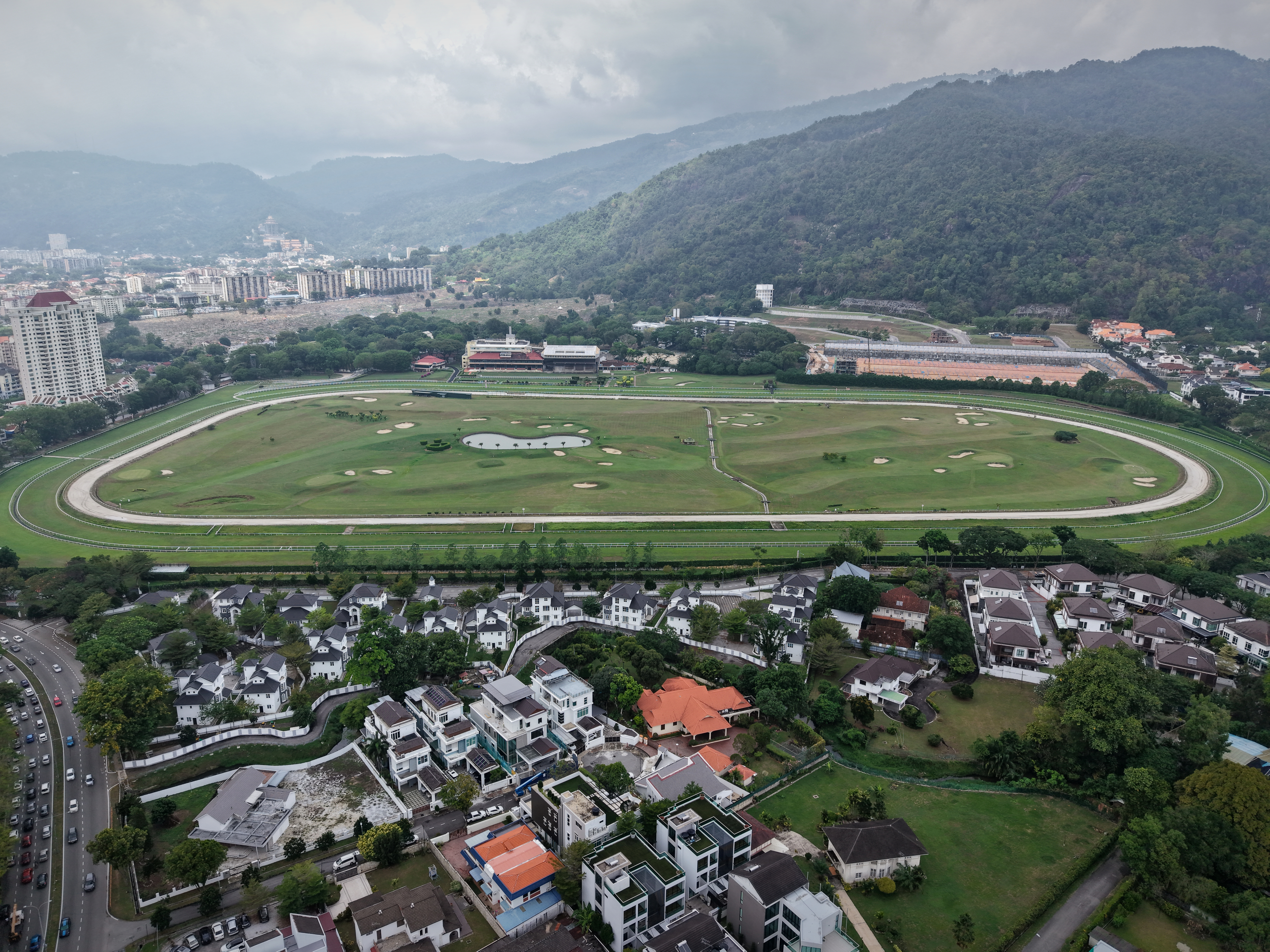
- An aerial view of the Racecourse two months prior to its closure.
- Interactive map of Batu Gantong Racecourse
- Location: George Town, Malaysia
- Coordinates: 5.4178°N 100.2994°E
- Owned by: Penang Turf Club
- Date opened: 1939; 87 years ago
- Date closed: 2025; 1 year ago
- Capacity: 14,000
- Race type: Flat racing

The Penang Turf Club (abbrev. PTC or KLKPP) is one of the three horse racing institutes in Malaysia alongside the Selangor and Perak turf clubs. Established in 1864, it currently owns a now-closed horse racing track near Batu Gantong Road in George Town within the Malaysian state of Penang. The race track has a three-storey grandstand with a capacity of 14,000. In addition to its primary function as a venue for horse racing, the 118.1-acre (47.8 ha) race track includes a nine-hole golf course.

In 2024, members of the PTC approved a resolution to dissolve the club within two years and list the race track for sale. The venue held its last horse race end of May in the following year.

== History ==
Founded in 1864, the PTC was the second oldest horse racing club in British Malaya, following the Singapore Sporting Club which was established in 1842. David Wardlow Brown was the club's first president.

The PTC originally received a land grant — provided free of charge by the Straits Settlements government — at Macalister Road for its first race track. The race track, measuring nearly 1,621.8 yd (1,483.0 m), was located at the site of what is now St. George's Girls' School. The PTC also maintained an office within the Government Offices at Weld Quay.

The original race track on Macalister Road incorporated a section designated for a golf course. The first structures of the track were constructed from wood and attap. In 1900, new grandstands were added to the race track. From 1912 to 1928, it was considered the most modern race track in Malaya.

In 1935, the PTC acquired the present-day 230-acre (93 ha) site at Batu Gantong. The race track was relocated to the Batu Gantong site by 1939. Horse racing continued to be permitted during the Japanese occupation, allowing the PTC to survive World War II unscathed.

The 230-acre (93 ha) site comprises the 118.1-acre (47.8 ha) race track, which has a grandstand with a capacity of 14,000 and includes a nine-hole golf course, as well as six other land parcels surrounding the race track.

=== Dissolution ===
In 2002, the PTC entered into an agreement with local property developer Abad Naluri for the sale of the race track. Abad Naluri had planned to build the RM25 billion Penang Global City Centre (PGCC), envisioned as a mixed-use development with commercial and residential components. Public opposition to the project contributed to Pakatan Rakyat (predecessor to the present-day Pakatan Harapan coalition) seizing power from the incumbent Barisan Nasional in the 2008 state election. The PGCC project was eventually scrapped.

In 2011, Berjaya Corporation acquired 23 acres (9.3 ha) from the PTC to develop the low-density residential neighbourhoods of Kensington Gardens and Jesselton Courtyard. As interest in horse racing declined and financial difficulties mounted following the COVID-19 pandemic, in an extraordinary general meeting (EGM) on 10 June 2024, members of the PTC voted to dissolve the club and list the race track for sale. At the time, the land and its associated properties were valued between RM2 billion and RM3 billion. However, by the end of 2024, the club received no qualifying bids, prompting plans to subdivide the land into smaller parcels to attract more potential buyers.

The last horse race at the PTC was held on 31 May 2025. Following the closure of the PTC, the Perak Turf Club and Selangor Turf Club are the only operational turf clubs within Malaysia.

== Facilities ==
At the time of its closure, the Penang Turf Club premises consists of the following facilities:

- 9 hole golf courses in the middle of the track established in 1948 made of cow grass fairways and rough Serangoon greens.
- VIP and Corporate Private Boxes at level 2 OM Enclosure and level 3 New Building.
- The Turf Club Museum at the Ground Floor of the main building.
- Taman Jesselton Club Bungalows at the Periphery of the Racecourse and foot of the Penang Hill (6 land parcels).

== Organisation ==
A pre-dissolution committee was set up as part of Penang Turf Club's closure plan before its official shutdown.

- President: Dato Ong Eng Khuan
- General Manager and Secretary: Mr Leow Khin Ming
- Financial Controller: Mr Ang Kar Boo
- Assistant Club Secretary: Ms Goh Su Yen
- Committee Members:
  - Dr. H'ng Peng Kiat
  - Mr. Jeffrey Lee Chin Wah
  - Mr. Lee Kean Teong
  - Mr. Saw Lip Thong
  - Dato' Seri Teh Choon Beng
  - Ir Rudy Lee Beng Liang
  - Ms. Teoh Mei Shean

== Major races ==
As much as three major races were held at the Batu Gantong Racecourse prior to its 2025 closure.

- Yang di-Pertua Negeri Gold Cup
- Penang Sprint Trophy
- Malaysian Magic Millions Classic

== See also ==
- Sport in Malaysia
