= King's Plate (South Africa) =

Grade 1 horse race in South Africa

The King's Plate (known as the Queen's Plate during the reigns of Queen Victoria and Queen Elizabeth II) is an annual Grade I horse race at Kenilworth Racecourse in Cape Town, South Africa that has been run since 1861, and is one of South Africa's premier horse races. Currently sponsored by the South African vintner L'Ormarins, it was branded the L'Ormarins Queen's Plate from 2005 to 2022, and the L'Ormarins King's Plate since 2022. Traditionally named in honour of the British monarch, it reverted to the "King's Plate" name as a result of the accession of King Charles III in September 2022.

The race was first run, as the Queen's Plate, in April 1861 in honour of Queen Victoria after she donated a silver plate and 500 sovereigns to the South African Turf Club.

The winner of the race earns a berth in the Breeders' Cup Mile.

It is customary for the British high commissioner to South Africa to attend the race and read out a message of good wishes from the British monarch.

== See also ==
- List of South African flat horse races
