= Sentinel (horse) =

South African-bred Thoroughbred racehorse

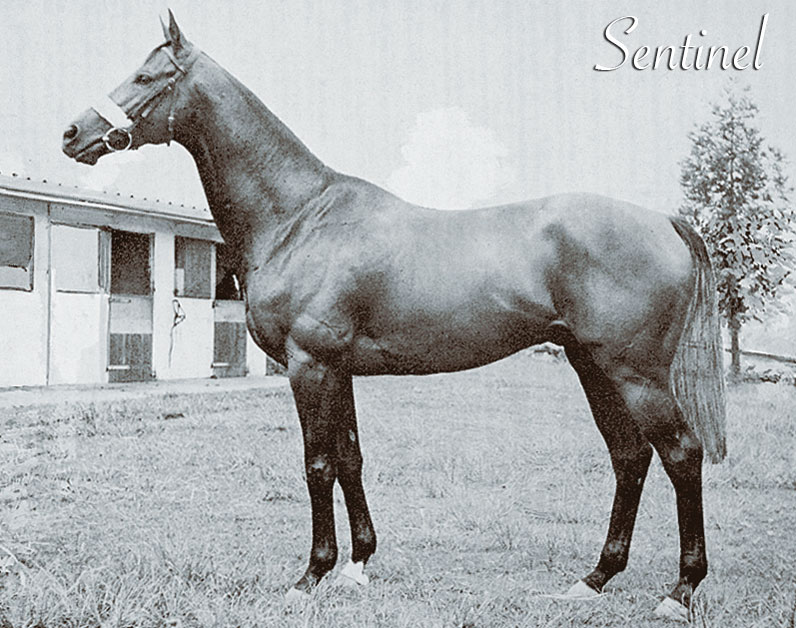
- t
- Sire: No Reprieve
- Grandsire: Court Martial
- Dam: Winters Eve
- Damsire: Wilwyn
- Sex: Stallion
- Foaled: 1968
- Country: South Africa
- Colour: Bay
- Breeder: Hartford Stud, South Africa
- Owner: A. R. & G. A. Ellis
- Trainer: Joe Joseph
- Record: 56: 29-13-5
- Earnings: R207 990

Major wins
- Natal Breeders Stakes (1971); African Breeders Stakes (1971); Natal Guineas (1971); Clairwood Christmas Handicap (1971); Cape of Good Hope Guineas (1972); Rupert Ellis Brown Plate (1972); South African Guineas (1972); Clairwood Champion Stakes (1972, 1973); Hawaii Stakes (1972); Gordon Kirkpatrick Memorial Handicap (1973); Cape Flying Championship (1973, 1974, 1975); Concord Stakes (1973); Drill Hall Stakes (1973); Newbury Chairmans Stakes (1973); Woolavington Cup (1973, 1975); Stewards Cup (1973); Transvaal Champion Stakes (1973); Keith Hepburn Champion St (1973); Fairview Autumn Stakes (1974, 1975); Joseph Dorfman Memorial Handicap (1974); National Sprint (1974)

Honours
- Sentinel Stakes (1000m) Greyville; Champion Sprinter South Africa 1972/73, 1973/74, 1974/75

Sentinel (foaled 1968) was a Champion South African bred Thoroughbred racehorse. He was bred and raced by the Ellis family from Hartford Stud (now part of Summerhill Stud) in Kwazulu Natal and trained by Joe Joseph. He raced from 2 to 6 (1971-1975) years of age. He won 29 and placed in 18 of his 56 starts and earned R207 990. He won a record 26 stakes races and was placed in another 17 stakes races. He won from 1000m to 1600m and won the Cape Flying Championship (now Grade 1) over 1000m in three successive years (1973–75).

== Background ==
Sentinel raced widely in his racing career, winning at 8 different racecourses in four different provinces of South Africa. He was born in the same crop that produced two of the best racehorses to run in South Africa, In Full Flight and Elevation. In Full Flight was the champion of the 1968 crop and won 16 of his 20 starts. Elevation won 14 of his 34 starts, placed in 18 and established an earnings record at the time (1974)Action Racing Online - Sign in. The 1968 crop also produced the outstanding stayer Numerator which won 18 races from 1200m to 3200m and placed 23 times. Sentinel was ridden by many jockeys in his 56 starts, including South African and British Champion jockey Michael Roberts and Champion Italian jockey Gianfranco Dettori, the father of Champion British jockey Lanfranco (Frankie) Dettori. He stood 17 hands and weighed 600 kg (~1300 lb).

== Racing career ==
Sentinel made his debut on 13 February 1971 and had his 56th and last start on 19 July 1975. He struck a purple patch between May 1973 to March 1974 and won ten of his thirteen starts and placed in the other three. He won three Cape Flying Championships (now Grade 1) over 1000m at Milnerton; raced four Woolavington Cups over 1400m at Clairwood, in which he won two and placed second in two; raced in three consecutive Drill Hall Stakes' over 1400m at Greyville, winning once and placing twice. He won two Guineas at three dead heating in the Cape of Good Hope Guineas at Milnerton and winning the South African Guineas at Greyville both over 1600m. Over sprint distances (1000m to 1400m) from 1972 to 1975 he raced 20 times winning 13 and placing in 7.

| Age | Starts | Wins | 2nds | 3rds |
|---|---|---|---|---|
| At 2 | 8 | 3 | 2 | 0 |
| At 3 | 15 | 8 | 5 | 1 |
| At 4 | 13 | 8 | 1 | 2 |
| At 5 | 10 | 5 | 5 | 0 |
| At 6 | 10 | 5 | 0 | 2 |
| | 56 | 29 | 13 | 5 |

== Honours ==
Although there were no official awards in South Africa at the time he raced he was widely acknowledged to have been Champion Sprinter over three seasons from 4-6 (1972/73-1974/75). He holds the record for the most number of stakes victories in South Africa - 26. Clairwood Racecourse named a race in his honour in 2012, the Sentinel Stakes, raced over 1000m. Since the closure of Clairwood Racecourse in 2014, it started being run at Scottsville.

== Stud and retirement ==
Sentinel was retired to stud at Hartford, but proved to be low on fertility. Seven of his progeny made it to the racecourse and only one failed to register a win. The best was the filly, Protectress, who ran second in the 1979 South African Oaks. He lived out his days as a galloping companion and lead horse for the Hartford foals.

== Record wins controversy ==
Sentinel was thought to be the record holder of the most wins by a South African racehorse at one time. However several horses won more races with Commando (44) and Darius (41) the two leaders and both gaining their wins in the period before 1946. Since 1946, Screech Owl (32) and Hear The Drums (34), have recorded more wins than Sentinel. No horse racing in South Africa is thought to have won more recognised stakes races (26) than Sentinel.
