= Turf (disambiguation) =

Turf may refer to:

== General ==
- Grass, either natural or artificial, including:
  - Sod, the surface layer of ground consisting of a mat of grass and grass roots, sometimes used as a construction material
  - Lawn, an area of grass maintained for decorative or recreational use
- Peat, used for fuel
- Vertisol, a type of soil, notably dark in color

== Sports ==
- Sports turf, grass surface for race tracks and athletic fields
- Golf course turf and other manicured sporting greens
- Horse racing, a colloquialism, but also a race held on a track surfaced with sports turf
- Turf Club (disambiguation), various racing institutions

== Places ==
- Turf Hotel, a public house at the Racecourse Ground in Wrexham, Wales
- Turf Moor, a football stadium in Burnley, Lancashire, England
- Turf Paradise Race Course, in Phoenix, Arizona, US
- Turf Tavern, a public house in Oxford, England

== Other uses ==
- Turf (video game), a location based real-time game for smartphones
- TURF analysis (total unduplicated reach and frequency), a statistical method
- Turf (Image Comics), a comic book from Image Comics written by Jonathan Ross, with art by Tommy Lee Edwards
- Turf (cigarette), a 1950s East German brand
- "Turf", a storyline in Batman: Legends of the Dark Knight
- Turf (film), a 2013 French film

== See also ==
- Turf can also denote an area that is being under someone's control, as in turf war (conflict)
- Astroturfing
- Artificial turf
- AstroTurf
- Poly-Turf
- 土地 (disambiguation)
