= Malayan Racing Association =

Governing body for horse racing in Malaysia and Singapore

- Persatuan Lumba Kuda Malaya
- The silhouette of a Jockey riding a horse as the official logo of MRA.
- Abbreviation: MRA, PLKM
- Established: 7 January 1896
- Type: Nonprofit
- Legal status: Corporate trust
- Headquarters: Seri Kembangan, Selangor, Malaysia
- Region served: Peninsular Malaysia; Singapore (Formerly)
- Members: 2 member organisations (excluding 2 former)
- Official language: English (main)
- Executive President: Chin Tong Leong
- Secretary: Lim Cheng Im Rosalind
- Chief Handicapper: Jarry Chong Kok Heng
- Affiliations: Asian Racing Federation (Asia, since 2001); International Federation of Horseracing Authorities (World, since 1993)
- Website: www.malayanracing.com

Malayan Racing Association (MRA or PLKM) is a federation of two currently-active Horse Racing Institutions in Peninsular Malaysia - Perak Turf Club and Selangor Turf Club as well as two former members - Penang Turf Club and Singapore Turf Club. Founded in 1896 as the Straits Racing Association (SRA) to regulate horse racing in Singapore and Malaya, the organisation got its present name in 1961. The association's area of jurisdiction makes it unique as the only racing authority in the world to regulate racing in two different countries.

At its peak, the Association is managed by a committee comprising three to four delegates nominated by each of the four associated Clubs, making it a total of 13 members. Today, there are only three delegates from each of the two remaining clubs.

== History ==
To regulate horse racing bets at the four turf clubs in both nations, the Federal Government of Malaysia enacted the Racing (Totalisator Board) Act on 27 March 1961, which simultaneously established the Totalisator Board of Malaysia as an agency under the governance of the Ministry of Finance. Under the act, each of the member turf clubs are required to elect two members to the Board.

The computerisation of the totalisator system in Malaysia began in 1976, transforming manual horse race betting into automated digital processes. This digital shift modernised operations across the Malayan Racing Association (MRA) circuit, and is followed by the computerisation of the sell-pay system in 1979, telephone betting in 1982 and the betting system in 1987.

In 1983, Closed-circuit television coverage was introduced to all turf clubs under MRA administration.

In 1988, Malayan Racing Association introduced the MRA Cup, an annual tournament jointly sponsored and hosted by the four turf clubs in Malaysia and Singapore on a rotation basis, with the Ipoh-based Perak Turf Club as the first host. Meanwhile in Singapore, Tote Board was established to govern Singapore Turf Club.

On 14 March 1991, the Ministry of Finance decided that the Totalisator Board will no longer directly involve in horse betting, but act as the Regulating Agency. So effective 31 August 1991, all horse racing and betting activities fall under the responsibility of the respective turf clubs and their agencies Usaha Tegas Sdn Bhd/Pan Malaysian Pools Sdn Bhd under Section 16 of the Racing Act 1961.

In 2005, the annual award ceremony MRA Awards Night was introduced to recognise the achievements of horse owners, trainers, jockeys and thoroughbreds.

On 9 August 2011, Jana Pendidikan Malaysia Sdn Bhd (JPM) bought the entire market shares of Pan Malaysian Pools Sdn Bhd from Tanjong Plc/Usaha Tegas Sdn Bhd. And on 5 October 2012, Pan Malaysian Pools Sdn Bhd issued a Notice of Renunciation as Board Agent for Racing Totalisator Operation. So effective 4 April 2013, Pan Malaysian Pools Sdn Bhd ceased operations as the Racing Totalisator Agent, following which the role was assumed by three Malaysian Turf Clubs independently.

In 2015, Malayan Racing Association announced the cancellation of MRA Cup and MRA Awards Night.

With the closure of Singapore Turf Club on 5 October 2024 and the Penang Turf Club on 31 May 2025 (the former due to declining spectatorship and demand of land for housing and other projects; and the latter due to dwindling interest in horse racing and financial difficulties), MRA's scope of focus is now limited to the entire Peninsular Malaysia through the remaining Turf Clubs in Perak and Selangor.

== Executive committee ==
Perak Turf Club

- John Lim Ewe Chuan
- Velluppillai Williams Balasingam
- Soo Lai Kwok

Selangor Turf Club

- Richard Cham Hak Lim
- Clement Chew Kuan Hock
- Mahendran Ponnia

MRA Officials

- Chin Tong Leong - Executive President
- Lim Cheng Im Rosalind - Secretary
- Jarry Chong Kok Heng - Chief Handicapper
- Deanthan Moodley - Chief Stipendiary Steward, Selangor Turf Club (SLTC)
- Salmee Hidayu Binti Alias - Accountant

== Members ==
=== Active members ===
- Perak Turf Club (Established 1895)
- Selangor Turf Club (Established 1896)

=== Former members ===
- Penang Turf Club (Established 1864; Defunct 2025)
- Singapore Turf Club (Established 1842; Defunct 2024)

== Racecourses ==
=== Active Racecourses ===
- Ipoh Racecourse
- Seri Kembangan Racecourse

=== Defunct Racecourses ===
- Ampang Road Racecourse
- Batu Gantong Racecourse
- Bukit Timah Race Course
- Farrer Park Field
- Kranji Racecourse
- Macalister Road Racecourse
- Taiping Racecourse

== Notable races ==
=== Active races ===
Perak Turf Club

- Charity Cup
- Perak Coronation Cup
- Perak Derby
- Sultan Gold Vase

Selangor Turf Club

- Piala Emas Sultan Selangor
- Selangor Gold Cup
- Sports Toto Supreme Challenge
- Tunku Gold Cup

=== Defunct races ===
Malayan Racing Association

- MRA Cup

Penang Turf Club

- Yang di-Pertua Negeri Gold Cup
- Penang Sprint Trophy
- Malaysian Magic Millions Classic

Selangor Turf Club

- Astro Wah Lai Toi Vase

Singapore Turf Club

- EW Barker Trophy
- Kranji Mile
- Lion City Cup
- Queen Elizabeth II Cup
- Raffles Cup
- Singapore Derby
- Singapore Gold Cup
- KrisFlyer International Sprint
- Patrons' Bowl
- Pesta Sukan Cup
- Singapore Airlines International Cup
- Singapore Classic
- Singapore St Leger
