= History of the Royal Malaysia Police =

The Royal Malaysia Police trace their existence to the Malacca Sultanate in the 1400s and developed through administration by the Portuguese, the Dutch, modernization by the British beginning in the early 1800s, and the era of Malaysian independence.

== Malacca Sultanate ==
The police system began in the Malacca Sultanate. Police responsibilities were combined with military duties. The sultan was the absolute authority: judge, religious leader, commander of the military and interpreter of the law. The sultanate's legal code was known as Undang-Undang Melaka.

The bendahara was second in command, after the sultan. He was the sultan's advisor, chief administrator, and sometimes a warlord. Bendahara Paduka Raja Tun Perak was the sultanate's best-known bendahara.

The Temenggung was responsible for maintaining security and peace statewide, including in the palace grounds. His tasks were arresting criminals, building prisons and imposing sentences.

Village chiefs, representatives of the sultan, were tasked with tax collection, law enforcement and public safety. The traditional police systems changed when the sultanate was conquered by the Portuguese, led by Afonso de Albuquerque, on 10 August 1511.

== Dutch rule ==
Portugal ruled Malacca for over a century. On 14 January 1641, a Dutch fleet conquered it with help from Johor troops in a battle at Aceh. The Dutch ruled Malacca with a combined military and Portuguese system. Its police force, known as Burgher Guard, was formed as the European population increased; the lower ranks were made up of Malaccans. Head villagers continued their duties as they did in the Malacca Sultanate under Dutch rule.

== British rule ==
When the British took over Malacca in 1795 (while Sumatera's Bangkahulu province remained under Dutch rule), William Farquhar was elected as the British military governor and the Dutch officers remained in their positions. The Malacca justice council was allowed to function as a magistrate and continue the Burgher Guard police duties.

== Penang ==
William Farquhar, the resident of Malacca from 1803 to 1818

On 11 August 1786, Francis Light came to Penang Island and named it Prince of Wales Island. The population of Penang at that time was small and mostly Malay fishermen. Three years later, its population had increased to 10,000 through immigration. Light felt a need for a police force; he pleaded his case to his superiors in India, but it was not well-received. His superiors later promoted him to superintendent, and instructed him to work alone.

In 1787, several riots occurred in Penang. European sailors were involved, and two Siamese were killed. Light wrote to East India Company governor Lord Cornwallis in India asking for legislation and a police force, but this request was also rejected. In 1792, he appointed community leaders for the Malays, the Chinese and the South Indians to act as magistrates in minor cases; other cases were presented to the superintendent. Each leader had five assistants. Although police responsibilities included water supply, registration of births, fire prevention and jail duty, their primary job was to uphold the law.

Europeans were not subject to local laws; when a European was involved in a 1793 murder case, Light had no jurisdiction; he again unsuccessfully asked the English East India Company director for a unified police force. He died on 21 October 1794, and was replaced by Forbes Ross Macdonald in 1796. Colonel Arthur Wellesley stopped at Penang during his journey to Manila. Noting the public-safety situation in Penang, he urged the Europeans to appoint a magistrate. On 19 April 1800, George Leith arrived in Penang as the new lieutenant-general. Four months later, John Dicken was appointed magistrate.

In early 1804, William Farquhar arrived in Penang to replace Leith as lieutenant-general. At the time, the police force was ineffective. The following year, the Penang administration was reshuffled; a governor was appointed, and a council established. On 25 March 1807, a charter was accepted; Penang established a court and a better police force, based on the charter.

== Sarawak ==
In Sarawak, there was the Sarawak Rangers and the Sarawak Constabulary.

== North Borneo ==
In North Borneo, later the Crown Colony of North Borneo, there was the North Borneo Police Force.

== Straits Settlements ==
The British East India Company acquired Singapore in 1819. Although Singapore progressed rapidly, Malacca and Penang did not. The three British colonies in Malaya were united in 1826, with Penang its administrative centre. In 1830, the Straits Settlements were governed by Resident Robert Fullerton; each province was governed by a deputy resident. Two years later, the Straits Settlements were united under a governor; the administrative centre moved to Singapore. The deputy residents were appointed resident counselors.

The 1867 move of the Straits Settlements from India to the British government, important to the history of Malaya, did not immediately affect the Straits Settlements ppolice. The Police Force Ordinance, amended in 1871, was operative from 1872 until the arrival of the Japanese; all police forces in the Straits Settlements were combined to form the Straits Settlements Police Force, controlled by an Inspector General of Police in Singapore. The police forces of Penang, Malacca, and Singapore were led by a superintendent, who acted as the chief police officer. The first Inspector General of the Straits was Charles Bushe Plunket.

== Federated Malay States ==
The British resident system was established in the Malaya states in 1874, pioneered by Perak. In 1895, four Federated Malay States were merged into a federation.

The federation united all its police forces on 1 July 1896. According to the federation's constitution, the police force, customs, Department of Survey, labour and defence departments were placed under government jurisdiction (headquartered in Kuala Lumpur). Its police force was headed by a commissioner and a chief of police. Although the commissioner was responsible for upper administration and surveillance, the police force was controlled by the Malay Associate States Chief Secretary; according to Section 3 of the Police Force Enactment (1924), "The Superintendent and administration of the Police Force shall be in the hands of the Commissioner and subject to the orders and control of the Chief Secretary".

The first Federated States Police Commissioner was Captain H. C. Syers (superintendent of Selangor), moved the state police headquarters from Klang to Kuala Lumpur. He was followed by Christian Wagner.

Under Syers, the police changed; a blue uniform was introduced. State uniforms were differentiated by the shape of the button and badge. Syers reformed police administration in Perak. At that time the Perak contingent had 842 members, 15 European officers, 472 officers, Sikh and Pathan officers, 14 orderlies and 302 lower-ranking officers and Malay constables. In Selangor there were six European police officers, 32 Pathans and 500 lower-ranking officers and Malay constables. With the establishment of the Malay States Guides under Robert Sandilands Frowd Walker in 1896, the police force was increased to six infantry companies and two artillery companies (900 members).

The Pahang police chief was named Duff, and his team had 245 members. F. W. Talbot led the Negeri Sembilan contingent. There were two inspectors, 56 Sikh officers and 250 low ranks and Malay constables. Around 1902 the police force had 2,160 members, three deputy commissioners, two assistant commissioners, 25 inspectors, two bumiputera officers, 1,961 low-ranking officers and constables, 93 detectives and 14 orderlies. The contingents were armed with Martini-Enfield converted carbines. Police officers were usually recruited from the Indian army. A training centre was established at the Bluff Road compound in October 1903.

To encourage Malays to enlist in the police force, Sultan Alang Iskandar of Perak was appointed assistant commissioner on 1 August 1905. Thirty-seven years later, the training centre was moved to PULAPOL (the Malaysian Police Training Centre).

The Federated Malay States Police increased from 2,138 to 3,241 officers, and the number of Europeans increased from 41 to 72. The chief problem faced at the time was gambling in the Chinese community.

The Police Force Act was passed on 9 January 1924, enumerating the roles and responsibilities of the Federated Malay States Police. The armed police were recognised as a civilian (rather than a military) body in 1934. Malays, Chinese and Indians were recruited, commanded by British officers. After Indian independence, Sikhs and Punjabis enlisted. Their uniform consisted of a songkok, tunic and trousers (similar to a British policeman, but white), with a sarong on top.

During World War II, when Malaya was conquered by the Japanese, the Federated Malay States Police was eliminated. The last police chief, Edward Bagot, fled to Singapore after British defence forces failed to stop the Japanese army advance. When Singapore fell to the Japanese, he was captured. Bagot had written the 15 June 1941 "Report on the Strikes in Selangor", predicting the worst surrender in British military history.

== Imperial Japanese armed forces ==
In 1939, Straits Settlements Police Chief A. H. Dickinson was appointed Civil Security Officer in Malaya. He was responsible for arranging the Malayan defence against Imperial Japanese Army threats.

In Selangor and Negeri Sembilan, special constables and extra police constables strengthened the police force. Police forces in Kedah, Perak and Kelantan were ordered to patrol the border areas between Malaya and Thailand. At that time, anti-British groups stepped up subversive activities. Anti-British campaigns were waged, particularly by two newspapers owned by the Malayan Communist Party: Emancipation News and Vanguard News.

On 9 December 1941, Imperial Japanese forces landed in Kelantan and Terengganu. The Japanese developed a military administration in Malaya. The police force continued to function, but it was used by the Japanese as a means of oppression.

== Malayan Union Police ==
At the end of 1945 and in early 1946, the British tried to establish a Malayan Union which had been planned in London. Despite violent opposition, the union became effective on 1 April 1946 and the Civil Affairs Police Force, Malay Peninsula became the Malayan Union Police Force.

== Malayan Emergency ==
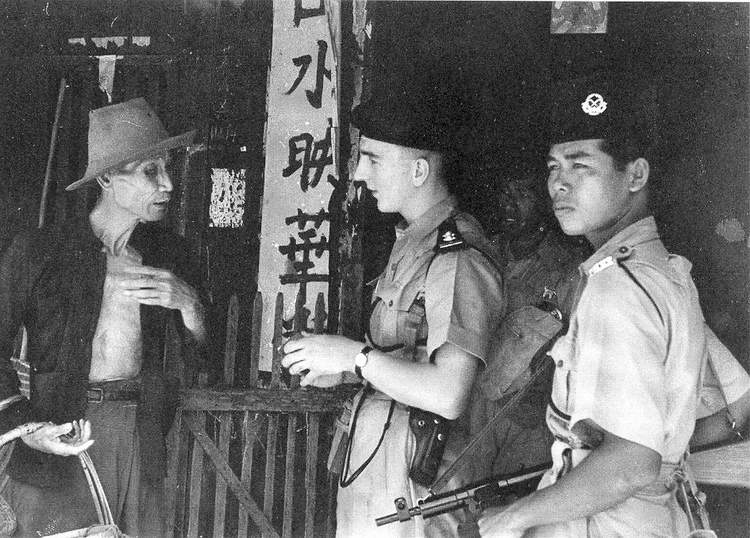
Federation of Malayan Police officers question a civilian during the Malayan Emergency.

The withdrawal of the Imperial Japanese Army at the end of World War II disrupted the Malayan economy. Problems included unemployment, low wages and scarce, expensive food. There was considerable labour unrest, and many strikes occurred from 1946 to 1948. The British administration attempted to quickly repair Malaya's economy, since revenue from Malaya's tin and rubber industries was important to Britain's post-war recovery. Protesters were dealt with by arrest and deportation, and became increasingly militant. On 16 June 1948, three European plantation managers were killed in Sungai Siput, Perak.

The British enacted emergency measures, first in Perak (in response to the Sungai Siput killings) and then nationwide. The Malayan Communist Party and other left-wing parties were outlawed, and the police were authorised to imprison communists (and those suspected of assisting communists) without trial. The initial government strategy was primarily to guard important economic targets, such as mines and plantationes. Harold Rawdon Briggs, the British Army's director of operations in Malaya, developed a strategy known as the Briggs Plan. Its central tenet was that the best way to defeat an insurgency was to cut the insurgents off from their supporters.

The British had 13 infantry battalions in Malaya at the beginning of the emergency, including seven partly-formed Gurkha battalions, three British battalions, two battalions of the Royal Malay Regiment and a British Royal Artillery regiment used as infantry. At all levels of government (national, state and district), military and civil authority was assumed by a committee of military, police and civilian officials. This allowed intelligence from all sources to be rapidly evaluated and disseminated, and permitted the coordination of anti-guerrilla measures.

== Royal title ==
Duli Yang Maha Mulia, Yang di-Pertuan Agong Abdul Rahman of Negeri Sembilan agreed to bestow the title "Royal" on the Federal Malaya Police Force on 24 July 1958, and it became known as the Royal Federation Of Malayan Police. The title was bestowed in appreciation of the role played by the police during the Malayan Emergency. Among those present at the parade by 700 police officers at the Police Training Centre were Deputy Prime Minister and Defence Minister Dato' Abdul Razak Hussin, Police Commissioner W. L. R. Carbonell, Deputy Commissioner C. H. Fenner and Singapore Police Commissioner A. E. G. Bladers. Three other Commonwealth police forces had a "Royal" title: the Royal Canadian Mounted Police, the Royal Ulster Constabulary and the Royal Hong Kong Police Force. According to police records, 1,346 policemen were killed in the line of duty during the emergency; 10,698 communists were killed, 5,972 by the police, who were tasked with combating attempts to establish a communist state by force and violence.

The motto Bersedia Berkhidmat (Ready To Serve) was introduced by Police Commissioner Arthur Young on 15 December 1952. In "Operation Service", Police Commissioner Directive No. 36, 1952, Young stressed the creation of understanding between civilians and police and hoped to counter negative views of the force.
