= International Federation of Horseracing Authorities =

International governing body of horseracing

IFHA
- International Federation of Horseracing Authorities
- Founded: December 23, 1993; 32 years ago
- Founded at: Paris, France
- Type: Sports governing body
- Headquarters: Paris, France
- Members: 60 national authorities
- Chairman: Winfried Engelbrecht-Bresges
- Vice-Chair: Horacio Esposito; Jim Gagliano (Americas); Masayuki Goto (Asia); Henri Pouret (Europe)
- Executive Director: Andrew Harding
- Director: Andrew Chesser; James Ogilvey
- Affiliations: Longines (Long-term partnership); World Organisation for Animal Health; Fédération équestre internationale
- Website: IFHA Online

The International Federation of Horseracing Authorities, also known by its acronym IFHA, is a global authority body for the sport of horseracing. Serving as a more formal body for the International Conference of Horseracing Authorities (ICHA), an annual series of conferences aimed at regulating horseracing, the IFHA was founded in 1993 to oversee matters related to fairness, quality and the rules related to horse breeding, racing and betting. Today IFHA's members are 60 national authorities in 55 countries, and is the only major global organization for horseracing. In addition to regulating the sport, the IFHA is also responsible for assessing the quality of horses and jockeys' performances globally, most notably through the World's Best Racehorse Rankings, an annual report of the best performing racehorses in graded races.

Since 2013, the IFHA has been partnered with Longines, the World Organisation for Animal Health, and the Fédération équestre internationale. It is a founding member of the International Horse Sports Confederation (IHSC).

== History ==
The IFHA's origins begin in 1961. On the eve of the year's Prix de l'Arc de Triomphe, horseracing authorities from Great Britain, the United States of America, Ireland and France agreed to coordinate their rules and actions to establish a more harmonized rules across the world. While this original committee was originally informal, by 1967 the committee's goals had grown popular enough to lead to the creation of the more formal International Conference of Horseracing Authorities in Paris, an annual conference designed to bring the world’s main racing authorities together to discuss and align the sport. To more easily facilitate decisions made at the conferences, the IFHA was formally founded on the IFHA was officially founded on December 23, 1993 in Paris.

On June 16, 2013, the IFHA announced a long term partnership with the Swiss watchmaker company Longines. Longines, who have long had an association with timekeeping for sporting events, have sponsored many racing events and awards associated with the IFHA since.

In July of the same year, the IFHA and the World Organisation for Animal Health (OIE) signed an agreement to coordinate matters related to the health and well-being of racing horses. The IFHA and OIE have hosted several conferences since on the subject of horses' health, including the first workshop in Asia to focus on the safe international transport of sport horses.

Later that year, on 7 November, 2013, the IFHA and Fédération équestre internationale, a global governing body that oversees non-racing equestrian sports, announced a partnership to launch the International Horse Sports Confederation, a not-for-profit organization designed to help better facility communication and cooperation between the two federations.

On October 8, 2024 at the 58th International Conference of Horseracing Authorities, the IFHA announced a new Racing Integrity Handbook, a series of guidelines and principals designed to improve regulations and combat corruption in the sport. The handbook has also been described as a way to promote horseracing's wider achievements against other sports. Alongside this, it announced the creation of the Council on Anti‐Illegal Betting & Related Crime, an expansion of the Asian Racing Foundation's regional council of the same subject.

== Horse rankings ==
One of the more prominent roles the IFHA has is maintaining several annual standing lists related to the quality of horseracing.

In January of every year, the IFHA release the "World's Top 100 Group/Grade 1 Races for 3yos and upwards," a list that rates the strongest Group 1 races in the last few years in terms of the quality of horses partaking. This is compiled using the IFHA’s ratings of the races’ first four placed horses.

The IFHA also maintains a standings table for both horses and jockeys, based on their performance over the previous year. The World's Best Jockey table began in 2014, with ranking being scored via performance in races included in the most recentTop 100 Group/Grade 1 Races list. The World's Best Racehorse Rankings, the current form of which began in 2008, allow for performance from races outside the Top 100 Graded Races list, but takes into account the relative performance and quality of other horses in each race a horse partakes in.

The leading horse and race for the year are presented with an award as part of the annual Longines World Racing Awards ceremony in January. The winning jockey is celebrated in December.

== Objectives ==
The IFHA state objectives for their organization on their website, including:

- Maintaining and amending the International Agreement on Breeding, Racing and Wagering (the IABRW), a voluntary agreement designed to promote fairness of members of affiliates.
- Improving the welfare and safety of both horses and riders, via standardised global racing rules.
- Planning international races, and overseeing the grading procedure for current and new races.
- Maintaining racing integrity via combating anti-illegal betting and doping.
- Certifying IFHA Reference Labs, facilities that specialise in equine drug testing.

While there have been calls since the early 2020s a "Olympic" style or other world event to help boost the awareness and popularity of horseracing, the IFHA have not committed to implementing such an event.

== Membership ==
The IFHA have numerous members of various levels of affiliation.

Main members

Country	Horseracing authority
Algeria	Société Des Courses Hippiques et du Pari Mutuel
Argentina	Jockey Club (Buenos Aires)
Australia	Racing Australia
Austria	Direktorium für Galopprennsport und Vollblutzucht in Österreich
Bahrain	Rashid Equestrian and Horseracing Club
Belgium	Fèdèration Belge des Courses Hippiques ASBL
Brazil	Jockey Club Brasileiro; Jockey Club de São Paulo
Canada	Jockey Club of Canada
Chile	Club Hipigo de Santiago and Valparaiso Sporting Club
Croatia	Croatia Gallop Association
Cyprus	Cyprus Turf Club
Czech Republic	Jockey Club Ceske Republiky
Denmark	Danish Jockey Club
France	France Galop
Germany	Direktorium für Vollblutzucht und Rennen
Great Britain (Note: Does not include Northern Ireland.)	British Horseracing Authority
Greece	Jockey Club of Greece
Hong Kong	Hong Kong Jockey Club
Hungary	Kincsem Nemzeti KFR
India	Turf Authorities of India
Ireland (Note: Includes Northern Ireland.)	Horse Racing Ireland; Irish Horseracing Regulatory Board
Italy	Ministry of Agriculture, Food Sovereignty and Forests (MASAF); General Directorate for Horseracing
Japan	Japan Racing Association; National Association of Racing
South Korea	Korea Racing Authority
Lebanon	SPARCA
Malaysia	Malayan Racing Association
Mauritius	MTC Sports and Leisure Ltd. (MTCSL)
Mexico	Jockey Club Mexicano
Morocco	SOREC
Netherlands	NDR
New Zealand	New Zealand Thoroughbred Racing Inc.
Norway	Galopp
Oman	Oman Horse Racing Club
Pakistan	Jockey Club of Pakistan
Panama	Hipica de Panama S.A.
Peru	Jockey Club del Peru
Philippines	Philippine Racing Commission
Poland	Polski Klub Wyscigow Konnych
Qatar	Racing and Equestrian Club
Romania	Romanian Jockey Club
Saudi Arabia	Jockey Club of Saudi Arabia
Serbia	Serbian Gallop Association
Slovakia	Turf Direktorium für die Slowakei
Slovenia	Slovenian Turf
South Africa	National Horseracing Authority of Southern Africa
Spain	Jockey Club Español
Sweden	Svensk Galopp AB
Switzerland	Galopp Schweiz (IENA)
Thailand	Royal Bangkok Sports Club
Tunisia	Société des Courses de Tunis
Turkey	Jockey Club of Turkey
United Arab Emirates	Emirates Racing Authority
United States	Breeders' Cup / NTRA; Jockey Club (United States)
Uruguay	HRU S.A.
Venezuela	SUNAHIP

Honorary members

Country	Horseracing Authority
Great Britain	Jockey Club (Great Britain)

National and regional organizations members

Country	Horseracing Authority
Asia, Oceania	Asian Racing Federation
Caribbean	Confederación Hipica del Caribe
Europe, Mediterranean	Europe and Mediterranean Horseracing Federation
North America	Association of Racing Commissioners International
South America	Organización Sudamericana de Fomento del Sangre Pura de Carrera

Affiliate members

Country	Horseracing Authority
Mongolia	Federation of Mongolian Horse Racing Sports and Trainers
New Zealand	Racing Integrity Board
Turkmenistan	Turkmen Atlary State Association
United States	1/ST; Horseracing Integrity and Safety Authority; Horseracing Integrity and Welfare Unit
Uruguay	Direccion General de Casinos

Authorities that have signed some of IFHA's International Agreements but are not full members

Country	Horseracing Authority
Barbados	Barbados Turf Club
China	China Stud Book Committee
Dominican Republic	Stud Book Dominicano
Finland	Suomen Hippos
Jamaica	Jamaica Racing Commission
Trinidad and Tobago	Trinidad and Tobago Racing Authority
