= Hear the Drums =

South African-bred Thoroughbred racehorse

Hear The Drums
- Sire: Gold Press
- Grandsire: Seeking The Gold
- Dam: Winning Glory
- Damsire: Gallic League
- Sex: Gelding
- Foaled: 15 October 2002
- Country: South Africa
- Colour: Bay
- Breeder: Summerhill Stud
- Owner: P L Fabricius
- Trainer: Des McLachlan
- Record: 64 : 34-12-1
- Earnings: R1 942 213

Major wins
- Fairview Merchants (2006); East Cape Sprint Cup (LISTED) (2007, 2009, 2010); Speedsters Stakes (2007, 2008, 2009); Cradock Place Stakes (2007, 2008, 2009); Glendore Sprint (2007, 2009, 2010); Arlington Flying Five (2008, 2009)

Awards
- Special Equus Outstanding Achievement Award (2009-10); Champion East Cape Sprinter (2007-08); Champion East Cape Older Male (2007-08)

Hear The Drums (foaled 15 October 2002, died 2016) was a South African bred racehorse. He has the highest number of verified wins (34) for any South Africa bred or raced horse. He was foaled in KwaZulu-Natal, South Africa at the Summerhill Stud. He was trained by Des McLachlan and owned by Peter Fabricius throughout his racing career. He died in 2016.

== Background ==
Hear The Drums passed through three sales rings unsold before he was finally sold to Mr PL Fabricius for R42 000 at the Vintage Ready-To-Run sale in 2005. He was sent to the training yard of Des McLachlan in Port Elizabeth, South Africa. He commenced his racing career on 29 June 2005 at Arlington racecourse in Port Elizabeth. He raced continuously for six years from 2005 through to 2011 after which he retired from racing. His last race was on 4 March 2011 at Fairview racecourse in Port Elizabeth.

== Racing career ==
Hear The Drums ran 64 times between June 2005 and March 2011. He won 34 races in that time and placed 13 times. All of his wins came in Port Elizabeth at either Arlington or Fairview racecourses. In his first three starts he was ridden by jockey Morne Winnaar who would ride him in another 14 races for 17 in total. The jockey who rode him the most was Gerrit Schlechter who partnered him on 21 occasions. Andrew Fortune (6 times), Wayne Agrella (6), MJ Byleveld (2), M van Rensburg (2), Guilermo Figueroa (2), Sihle Cele (1), Mark Khan (1), Eldin Weber (1), Francois Herholdt (1), Brandon Morgenrood (1), Alec Forbes (1) and Anton Marcus (1) partnered him in his remaining races.

In his 64 starts he competed against 234 individual horses, with Glimmering Gold (20 times), Kings Troop (19), Ashtonvale (15), Disappear (15), Mazarette (15), Juan Pabilo (14) and Take A Chance (11), his most frequent opponents. His highest weight impost was 64 kg (141 lbs) and his lowest 50 kg (110 lbs). He ran 31 times over 1000m, twice over 1100m, 23 times over 1200m, three times over 1300m, twice over 1400m and three times over 1600m. He won from 1000m to 1300m. His racing record over 1000m was 31 : 19-8-0 and over 1200m was 23 : 12–3–1. His fastest winning time over 1000m was 56.06s and his fastest time over 1200m was 67.85s. He earned 55 pay-checks in his 64 starts with his highest R78 125. His total earnings were R1 942 213.

He raced at Arlington racecourse 26 times, Fairview racecourse 35 times and Kenilworth racecourse 3 times. He won the East Cape Sprint Cup, a Listed race, three times in 2007, 2009 and 2010. He also won the Speedsters Stakes and the Cradock Place Stakes in three consecutive years from 2007 to 2009. He won the Glendore Sprint three times in 2007, 2009 and 2010. He won the Arlington Flying Five in 2008 and 2009. He contested the Grade 1 Cape Flying Championship at Kenilworth in Cape Town on three occasions, 2008 to 2010. His best finish in that race was a fourth in both 2009 and 2010. These three races were his only starts outside his home base in Port Elizabeth.

He recorded his first win on 15 July 2005 and his last and 34th win on 3 December 2010. He was awarded a Special Equus Outstanding Achievement Award in 2011 for achieving 33 wins in 2010 and breaking a then thought-to-be South African record of wins. He was awarded the East Cape Champion Sprinter and Older Male in 2008/09.

Racing Record
Age	Starts	Wins	2nds	3rds
At 2	2	1	0	0
At 3	14	6	3	1
At 4	10	5	2	0
At 5	13	6	3	0
Ar 6	9	7	1	0
At 7	11	8	1	0
At 8	5	1	2	0
	64	34	12	1

He was retired to his birthplace Summerhill Stud where he was a companion for the studs annual crop of weanlings and yearlings. He died in 2016.

== Record wins controversy ==
Hear The Drums was thought to have set a record number of wins for a South African racehorse when winning his 30th race in January 2010 and passing the then believed record of 29 wins set by Sentinel in the 1970s. However it was then claimed that a horse named Screech Owl had in fact won 32 times in the 1950s in South Africa. Hear The Drums passed the 32 wins mark on 23 July 2010 and eventually retired with 34 wins. It was then claimed that a horse called Darius won 43 races between the period 1912 and 1929. The full race record records of either Screech Owl or Darius have never been published and the sources at this stage remain sketchy other than quotes from the claimants, with no direct sources quoted. Both Sentinel and Hear The Drums records can be checked in the annual South African Racing Calendars as well as from various sources online.
