= Robert Sandilands Frowd Walker =

Colonial administrator, footballer (1850–1917)

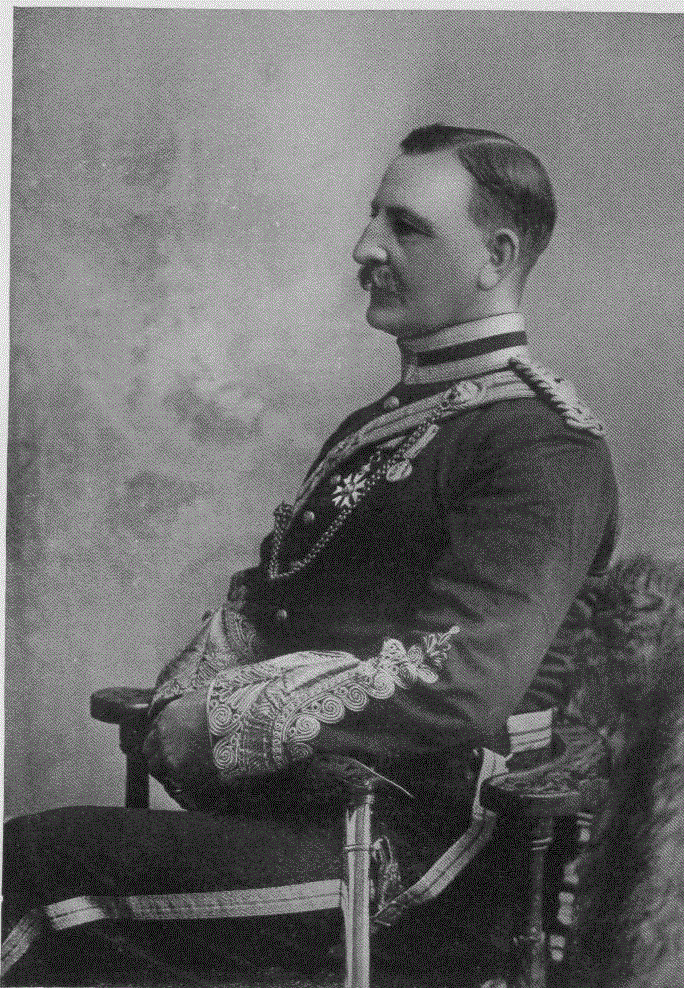
- Born: 13 May 1850; Chester, England
- Died: 16 May 1917 (aged 67) Knockholt, Kent, England
- Service years: 1870–1917
- Rank: Lieutenant-Colonel
- Awards: C.M.G.

Lieutenant-Colonel Robert Sandilands Frowd Walker CMG (13 May 1850 – 16 May 1917), also known as R. S. F. Walker, was a prominent figure in Malaya during the British colonial era in the late 19th century.

During his youth he was an amateur sportsman, and played three times for the English football XI against Scotland, scoring four goals, in the 1870 to 1872 representative matches.

== Early life and education ==
Walker was born in Chestercastle, (in the Great Boughton registration district), in Chester, the son of John and Camilla Walker. He was educated at Brentwood School, Essex before entering the Royal Military College, Sandhurst.

At Sandhurst, he showed himself to be a keen all-round sportsman, representing the college at athletics in 1869 and 1870 in competitions with the Royal Military Academy, Woolwich. He played for the Sandhurst cricket team in 1869, including the match against the Royal Military Academy, Woolwich in May. The following year he was captain of the cricket team. In May 1870, he won the 120 yards hurdles and the pole jump in the annual athletics competition against the Woolwich Academy.

On graduating from Sandhurst in 1870, he was awarded the Sword of Honour which was presented to him by the Duke of Cambridge, who was then Commander-in-Chief. He continued to use the sword throughout his career and had it re-hilted to conform to the 1895 regulations. This sword is probably the one depicted in the statue of Walker that stands outside the Perak Museum at Taiping.

== Football career ==
After leaving Sandhurst, he joined the Clapham Rovers Football Club and was also a member of the Wanderers club. In November 1870, he was selected by C. W. Alcock to represent "England" in the second "pseudo-international" match against a Scottish XI. He scored England's goal in a 1–0 victory; according to the match reports "[following] a well-executed run-down by C.W. Alcock, in conjunction with a final kick from the foot of R.S.F. Walker, enforced the surrender of the Scottish goal" and "barely ten minutes had elapsed before a neat run down by C.W. Alcock, resulted in a goal to the side of England, the final kick which secured the coveted honour for the South being administered by R.S.F. Walker".

The following February, Walker was again England's scorer in a 1–1 draw; the match report included a reference to the Combination Game style of football:

It seemed as if the [Scottish] defence would prove more than equal to the attack, until a well-executed run-down by C.W.Alcock, W.C. Butler and R.S.F. Walker, acting in concert, enabled the last-named of the trio to equalise the score by the accomplishment of a well-merited goal for England.

The match report concludes: "For England, R.S.F. Walker was untiring in his efforts forwards until the close." In November 1871, Walker made his third and final appearance for England. Walker scored both England's goals in a 2–1 victory; the match report describes his goals thus:

So persevering were the attacks of the English, that at last a loud cheer proclaimed the fall of the Scotch citadel to a well-directed shot by Walker.
It appeared as if [England] were likely to have the game entirely in their own hands, as within a very short time a second goal was obtained for England by R.S.F. Walker.

In conclusion, the report describes Walker as "the hero of the English eleven".

He was also selected for the Scotland vs. England rugby international of 1873, although he did not actually play.

== Military career ==
Walker in 1896

In 1870, aged twenty, he joined the 28th (North Gloucestershire) Regiment of Foot; on 28 October 1871, he was gazetted as an Ensign and thence to Lieutenant; he was one of the last ensigns to be gazetted in the British Army. With the 28th Foot, he served in Gibraltar and Malta.

In 1874, he was transferred to Perak, but was then moved first to Hong Kong and then to Singapore where, in 1878, he was aide-de-camp to Sir William Robinson, Governor of the Straits Settlements. In November 1878, he accompanied Robinson to Bangkok for the investiture of King Chulalongkorn as a Knight Grand Cross of the Order of St Michael and St George.

Early in 1879, he entered the service of the Federated Malay States as Acting Commissioner of the Perak Armed Police, and was also the Acting Assistant Resident. By 1884, he was Commandant of the 1st Perak Sikhs with the local rank of Major. Five years later, he was granted the honorary rank of Lieutenant-Colonel whilst employed with the Perak Police Force. In 1902, he was granted the local rank of Lieutenant-Colonel while employed as Commandant of the Malay States Guides.

He acted as Assistant Resident in Perak (1882), Secretary to the Government of Perak (1889), acting British Resident in Selangor (1899) and acting British Resident in Perak (1900).

== Police career ==
=== Perak Sikhs ===
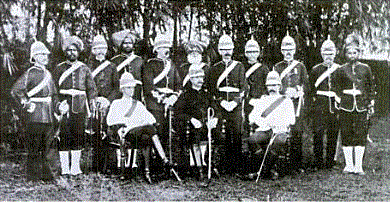
Lt. Col. R.S.F. Walker and the Perak Armed Police at Taiping, 1890

In 1879, Walker took command of the Perak Armed Police from Major Paul Swinburne turning it into a quasi-military force based almost entirely on Sikh and Pathan recruits. In 1884, Walker (now promoted to Major) successfully petitioned for the Perak Armed Police to be allowed to style themselves the "1st Battalion, Perak Sikhs". At this time, the police force had a strength of 650 men, some of whom were sent to Parit Buntar and Telok Anson. Others performed guard duties at the residency in Taiping and maintained law and order in the State of Perak, including a section of cavalry troopers. The force was engaged mainly in dealing with local uprisings, with occasional interventions in labour disputes between Chinese labour gangs and their bosses.

On 29 November 1887, following friction between the Ghee Hin and Hai San secret societies, a brothel skirmish in Papan escalated into a violent clash which became known as the "Papan Riots", the most serious Chinese secret society clash ever to take place in the Kinta district. The riots were quelled by Walker and the Perak Sikhs but flared up again in September 1889. In "a show of force", Walker and the Perak Sikhs, responding to reports received from the acting magistrate, visited the mining areas at Kinta, inspecting the kongsis in which the secret society members lived. The appearance of the feared "Mungkali Kwai" (Sikh Devils) helped prevent any "untoward incidents".

Walker's efforts to quell the riots were praised by the Governor:

[He] has done himself great credit, often working from daybreak to midnight – and he has settled some very difficult disputes between Chinese Towkays and mobs of coolies, with great patience, tact, judgement and decision.

During the mining boom years of the early 1890s, Kinta was hit with a wave of crime, influenced by drinking and gambling. As a result of the breaking down of the secret societies, there was less organised crime but the region was plagued with roving gangs of robbers. Walker complained to his superiors that he could not police the district with a police force of only 196:

Police work in Kinta, as elsewhere, has increased with the population, and the number of men for work does not increase proportionally. New places . . . keep opening out, but although the old places do not die as these spring up, the same number of men are still supposed to be sufficient to efficiently check crime.

In early 1892, a large force from the Perak Sikhs was sent to Pahang to quell an uprising there. Following the suppression of the "Pahang disturbances", Walker was again able to concentrate his attention on the situation in Perak. Following a sudden increase in crime in the Ipoh division in the second half of the year, Walker visited all the main towns, inspecting the mines and meeting the towkays [mine owners] who "cried out for police protection". Walker telegraphed his headquarters in Taiping to request reinforcements and within two months his forces in Ipoh had been strengthened by about 100 men.

Several new police stations were opened with financial assistance from the mine-owners and increased patrols on the Tambun road helped reduce the number of robberies and assaults on the highway, although Walker complained that "it exhausts the resources of any force and the constitution of the men." Referring to the rapid growth of crime in northern Kinta, Walker remarked:

No wonder that the crime has increased, as increase it must, with a mining population of Chinese, a race that knows no repose, that settles only for the moment where money is to be made with the greatest ease, that would rob their best friends if they themselves should have lost their savings at the gaming table.

Crime with such a population as this means progress, and although a check has been given to it by raising the Force to its utmost capacity, at the sacrifice of other parts of the state, strengthening the detective branch, and paying judiciously for information, crime must arise, and as long as a fair number of discoveries are made of crimes most difficult to detect in a country where escape is so easy, and a criminal can with comparative ease conceal himself, it is all that can be expected.

To assist in the fight against crime, Walker recommended that the headquarters of the Kinta police should be moved from Batu Gajah to Ipoh.

I beg very earnestly to request the Government to remove the headquarters of my Department from Batu Gajah to Ipoh. From the latter place the officer commanding can regulate his duties with greater efficiency. Almost any portion of his District could be proceeded to with greater rapidity from Ipoh. His living at Batu Gajah merely means an excessive amount of travelling.

Walker's recommendation was accepted by the Government and the district police headquarters were moved to Ipoh in 1894 at the same time as the headquarters of the Perak Chinese Protectorate were moved from Taiping to Ipoh.

=== Malay States Guides ===
In 1896, following the inauguration of the Federated Malay States, the Perak and Selangor Sikh Police forces were consolidated into the "Malay States Guides" with Lt. Colonel Walker as their first commandant. The Guides were modelled on the Corps of Guides of the North-West Frontier of India.

The Guides consisted of six companies of infantry, a depot company with a field company of 15-pounder breech-loading guns and a mountain company. Each company was under the command of a British officer and was made up of two Sikh officers and 100 non-commissioned officers and men; their total strength was 900 personnel.

At the outbreak of World War I the Malay States Guides were sent to Singapore to reinforce the garrison there. In December 1914 the bulk of the regiment returned to their peacetime cantonment in Taiping but the artillery battery remained in Singapore where they were attached to an Indian Army regiment, the 5th Light Infantry. In February 1915 about half of the 5th LI mutinied and a small number of the MSG detachment were court-martialed and convicted of involvement. The Malay States Guides were subsequently posted to active service in Aden. The regiment was disbanded for reasons of economy in 1919.

== Personality ==
Walker had the reputation of being something of a disciplinarian with a fierce temper, and was known to the local Malays as the "Black Panther". He has been described as "at the best of times very much a martinet" and "a difficult man to work with".

In his "Personalities of Old Malaya", written in 1930, Cyril Baxendale relates an incident involving Walker and Chief Inspector John Symes. During a visit by Frank Swettenham, then the Resident of Perak, to the Police barracks, Swettenham admired a row of trees providing shade to the parade square. On being told by Symes that Walker had ordered the trees to be felled, Swettenham insisted that they should be spared. On a subsequent formal visit attended by Walker, Swettenham was surprised to see that the trees had been cut down. On inquiring why, Symes replied:

"Colonel's Order, Sir," replied Symes.

"Inspector Symes, did you tell Colonel Walker that the Resident gave you orders not to cut down those trees?"

"Yes, Sir."

"What did Colonel Walker say?"

A few moments of hesitation and then Symes sprang to attention and as he raised his hand in formal salute:

"Damn the British Resident, Sir."

== Sport and leisure in Malaya ==
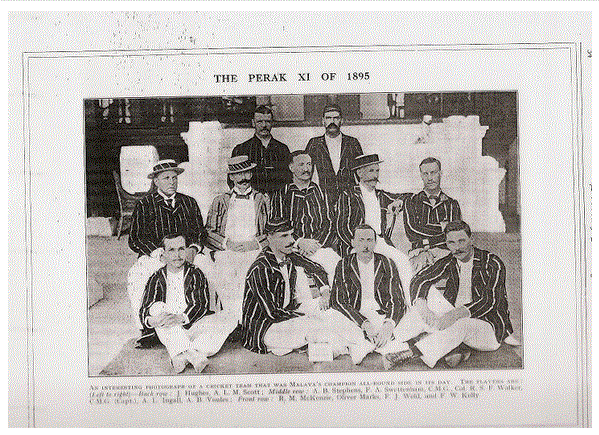
Perak Cricket Team in 1895 including Frank Swettenham (Middle row, 2nd left) and Walker (Middle row, centre)

Walker continued to be involved in all forms of sport throughout his life. Together with Sir Frank Swettenham, Governor of the Straits Settlements, and Mr. E. W. Birch, C.M.G., later British Resident in Perak, he helped introduce cricket to Perak and surrounding areas.

Walker also helped introduce football to the state; he founded a team in Taiping and donated the Ship Challenge Trophy.

He helped found the Perak Club in 1881 which had a playing field used for cricket, football, hockey and tennis. Described as the "father of cricket and football in the [Malay] Peninsula", the club organised the first inter-state matches in Malaya. The Perak Club became the premier social institution of Taiping and the senior club in the Malay States.

Walker was a member of many other sporting, service and social clubs including the Perak Turf Club, the United Service Institute, the Naval and Military Club, the Wellington Club and the Ranelagh Club.

While in Hong Kong in the 1870s, as well as playing cricket he was the stroke in the regimental boat which defeated a team from the United States Ship Kearsarge.

Walker was an avid collector of Malay weapons, brasses, and silver and had what was reputed to be "the finest collection of old china in the peninsula". His collection of Malay stone implements from the Straits Settlements is now in the Pitt Rivers Museum at the University of Oxford.

== Contributions to Malayan society ==
During his time in Perak, Walker made several contributions to local society, many of which still remain.

The esplanade in the town centre was originally the Parade Square and was laid out by Walker in 1890.

In Taiping and nearby Pokok Assam there were roads named for Walker although these have since been renamed as "Jalan Maharajalela" and "Jalan Temenggong" respectively.

=== Taiping Lake Gardens ===
In 1880, Walker conceived the idea of transforming a disused mining site in Taiping into a garden for the benefit of the townspeople. The land was donated to the town by its owner, Mr. Chung Thye Phin, a wealthy tin miner and rubber planter. By 1884, with the help of Walker and his police staff, the Taiping Lake Gardens were complete with grasses, flowers and trees; the 62 hectares site was the first public gardens in Malaya.

=== All Saints' Church, Taiping ===
The history of All Saints' Church, the earliest Anglican church in Malaya, can be traced from 1883 when Walker presided over a meeting to arrange for funds to be collected to pay for the stipend of a clergyman.

== Honours ==
Walker was created a Companion of the Order of St Michael and St George in 1901 "in recognition of his public services".

He was also a Fellow of the Royal Geographical Society, the Royal Zoological Society, the Royal Colonial Society and of the Royal Colonial Institute.

For his work in settling the labour troubles he was presented with a sword by the Chinese community.

He commanded the dismounted colonial troops at the celebrations to mark Queen Victoria's Diamond Jubilee in 1897. He was later given the honour of laying the foundation stone of the Diamond Jubilee Wadda Gurdwara Sahib at Penang on 3 June 1901. After a formal procession from the jetty at Penang Harbour, accompanied by a large body of Sikhs, Walker laid the foundation stone of the new building with a trowel made of solid silver.

== Retirement and death ==
In 1896, he married Mrs. Beatrice Bolton (née Ireland), the widow of Lieut. Colonel Richard Bolton, of the Royal Horse Guards, and eldest daughter of the late Thomas James Ireland, M.P., of Ousden Hall, Suffolk.

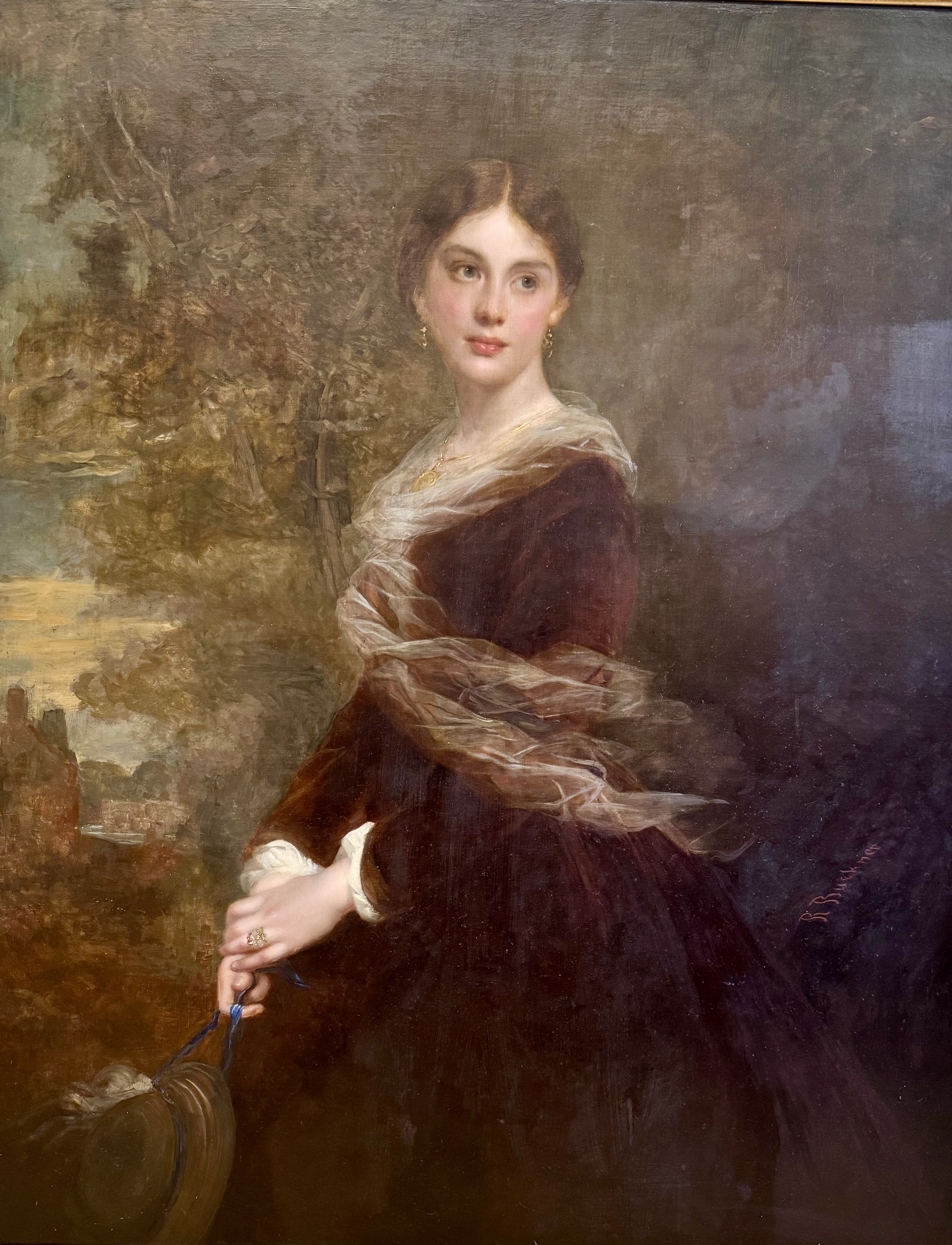
Mrs Beatrice Bolton circa 1869, became Mrs Frowd Walker in 1896

Walker retired in 1910 on the grounds of ill-health; in a private letter he said:

Thirty-two and a half years since I landed in Singapore and knocked the ball about on the old cricket ground. A longish spell, that has passed very quickly, at times very happily. I cannot help feeling I am leaving a splendid little Corps behind me, and only wish it was a Brigade.

On his retirement a bronze statue was erected in his honour in Taiping; it stands today outside the Perak Museum; the sculptor was Charles Leonard Hartwell R.A. (1873–1951). According to the inscription on the sculpture:

This statue was erected by public subscription of the Sultans of Perak and Johore and many personal friends of the principal Chinese Towkays and of the officers and men of the Regiment of Malay State Guides to be a memorial of ROBERT SANDILANDS FROWD WALKER
Companion of the Most Distinguished Order of St. Michael and St. George who retired in 1910 after 31 years in Perak and the Federated Malay States.
For his hospitality and encouragement of all branches of sport and his success in raising the Regiment of Malay States Guides to the highest excellence this statue will serve as a continued remembrance.

After his return to England, Walker lived at Scott's Lodge, Knockholt, Kent. During the First World War, he was appointed as commandant of the internment camp for German and Austrian detainees at Alexandra Palace. According to Baxendale:

he tempered his strict regard for discipline with his usual kindness, and the encouragement he gave to the prisoners to pursue their various trades won their respect and affection.

Walker suffered from a long-term complaint of the inner ear; he died of a heart attack on 16 May 1917, a few days after his 67th birthday. He is one of the oldest soldiers commemorated on the Commonwealth War Graves Commission Debt of Honour database. He was buried at St Katharine's Church, Knockholt.
