= Taiping Clubs =

Sports and recreation clubs in Taiping, Malaysia, during the 1880s

Coordinates: 4.856846°N 100.7436497°E

The Taiping Clubs were sports and recreation clubs that existed in the city of Taiping, Malaysia, during the 1880s. At the time, the city saw significant growth in European as well as Chinese, Indian, Arab, and Indonesian communities, and thus the need for such clubs arose. The following is a non-exhaustive list of these establishments.

== Perak Club (Old Club) ==
The Perak Club was the premier social institution of Taiping and was the senior club in the Malay States. Colonel Robert Sandilands Frowd Walker was in large measure responsible for its formation and development in 1881. Among the early patrons were Sir Hugh Low, formerly British Resident of Perak, William Edward Maxwell, Assistant Resident, and Major Paul Swinburne. The clubhouse was erected by the government, and is still kept in repair by the Public Works Department. In front of the building is a playing field which is used for cricket, football, hockey, and tennis. The athletics section of the club is known as the Cricket and Recreation Club, and was the leading sporting club of the Federated Malay States. It organized the first inter-state matches in Malaya. Many European residents of Larut, Matang, Krian, and Upper Perak were members of the club, and as was usual with most Federated Malay States clubs, ladies were admitted to its privileges gratis.

== New Club ==
The leading social institution in the capital of Perak was the New Club, formed in 1892. Its chief promoters were the late Dr. Shepherd and Messrs. Lefroy, Mais, Gray, and Aylesbury. During the first year of its existence, the clubhouse was sold to the Sultan of Perak, and the present structure, built on a site granted by the Perak Government and H.M. Sultan Sir Idris Shah from plans prepared by Lefroy in 1893, was opened in the following year. The building scheme was financed by the issue of debentures to the value of 10,000 dollars, nearly the whole of which has now been paid off. The clubhouse overlooks the cricket and football grounds and the Taiping Hills. It contains reading, billiard, and card rooms, a large dining room, and five residential chambers. To the rear of the club building there is a croquet ground. The Taiping Golf Club has its headquarters onsite.

== Perak Turf Club ==
The Perak Turf Club was established in 1884; it was the first exclusive turf club ever built in Perak. It was the idea of Sir Frank Swettenham, who was passionate about horse racing. The new race course was located at Waterfall Road, later changed to Race Course Road, near the Lake Gardens. It held ordinary racing in the Federated Malay States — the major tournaments were held at Penang, Selangor, or Singapore. In 1906, it had a membership of about 250. The present course is at Waterfall Road, Taiping, which is 7 furlongs in length. There was an old course, situated about three miles away from Taiping, on which races were run. In 1886, Burma ponies provided most of the racing and the meetings were primarily social functions. The turf club was the only club that attracted people of all classes, especially the Chinese, to mingle around, because of the sweepstakes and lotteries, as gambling was a favourite pastime. Sir E.W. Birch, a racing enthusiast, would travel to distant turf clubs just to join the major tournament, and was crucial to developing racing interest in the area. In 1934, when the importance of Taiping had declined below that of Ipoh, the club was shifted to Ipoh, still bearing the same name.

== Taiping Swimming Club ==
The club was formed in 1914 and shared a building with the New Club. At the beginning, the club's activities were carried out at the waterfall site near the foothill of Maxwell Hill. However, in 1929, a swimming pool was built near the Maxwell Hill to accommodate the growth in membership.

== Perak Golf Club ==
The Perak Golf Club was established in 1894 and housed at the New Club buildings. It claimed to be the first of its kind formed in the Federated Malay States. This nine-hole golf course was reserved exclusively for New Club members. The golf field was originally located near the Taiping Goal.

== Ladies’ Rifle Association ==
The Ladies' Rifle Association was formed in 1903.

== Sources ==
- Swettenham, Sir Frank, British Malaya: An Account of the Origin and Progress of British Influence in Malaya, London, (1955)
- Wright, Arnold, Twentieth Century Impressions of British Malaya, London (1908)
- Keane, Augustus Henry, A Geography of the Malay Peninsula, Indo-China, the Eastern Archipelago, the Philippines, and New Guinea (1892)
- Harrison, C.W., An Illustrated Guide to the Federated Malay States (1910)
- Smith, D. Warres, European Settlements in the Far East (1900)
- Japan. Tetsud-osh-o, An official guide to eastern Asia v.5 1920
- Federated Malay States Railways Pamphlet (1914)
- Eugene Khoo, 2007 A History of Taiping, Malaysia
