= Penang Global City Centre =

General information
- Type: Residential Properties, Leisure
- Location: Penang, Malaysia

Design and construction
- Architect: Asymptote Architecture
- Developer: Abad Naluri, Equine Capital Bhd (MYX: 1147)

The Penang Global City Centre (PGCC) was a proposed project to be located at Penang Turf Club on Penang Island, Malaysia. The developers who proposed PGCC hoped to use 50,000 square metres (540,000 square feet) divided between two five-star hotels, a 75,000 square metres (810,000 square feet) Penang performing arts centre, a 400,000 square metres (4,300,000 square feet) retail complex, 25,000 square metres (270,000 square feet) divided between two office towers, 70,000 square metres (750,000 square feet) of residential properties, a 100,000 square metres (1,100,000 square feet) world-class convention centre, a 1,500 square metres (16,000 square feet) observatory tower, 190,000 square metres (2,000,000 square feet) of parking space, monorail transportation, and a public arena. Following public opposition due to an undemocratic decisionmaking process, no environmental assessment, and concerns about the impact on Penangites, the PGCC plan was blocked.

The PGCC, with an estimated gross development value (GDV) of RM25 billion, was to be sited on a 104 ha plot where the Penang Turf Club currently stands. Abad Naluri bought the land for RM488mil in 2002.

The PGCC was designed by Asymptote Architecture, under leadership of Hani Rashid and Lise Anne Coutur. It was to be built on a 185 hectare plot (1.9 square KM), featuring two iconic towers – each standing 200 meters (660 feet) high. It would have taken at least 15 years to complete.

== Basic Information ==
- Retail Complex: 384.953 m^{2}.
- Convention Center: 95.174 m^{2}.
- Penang Performing Arts Center (PenPAC): 73.950 m^{2}.
- Condominium Towers: 61.718 m^{2}.
- Hotel A and Service Apartments: 23.130 m^{2}.
- Hotel B and Service Apartments: 25.725 m^{2}.
- Offices: 22.530 m^{2}.
- Observatory: 1,256 m^{2}.
- Parking: 183,390 m^{2}.

== Controversy and criticism ==
The development of PGCC was criticised as misleading and lacking in transparency. The controversy ultimately led to the widespread PGCC boycott campaign, and to the plan being put on hold. Petitions, banners and other digital media were launched by the local community to raise awareness of the impact of the PGCC development to the public.

In early September 2007, a few major non-governmental organisations in Penang joined forces to form The PGCC Campaign Group to oppose the development of Penang Global City Centre (PGCC) Project. However, the group is facing a mainstream media blackout. The group identified several issues surrounding the development.

PGCC's developers also have been criticised for not providing details about their claims of a 'zero carbon' rating.

Brochures and official website. produced by the developer only showed two towers. Residential properties with over 37 buildings was not highlighted in any official publication by the developers.

== Response of local authorities ==
The Penang Island Municipal Council and the Penang state government under the previous administration have been reluctant to demand any public accountability or organise public hearings. None of the Penang citizens except for 16 representatives of the Residents Association of Jesselton were invited for a closed door meeting. The Penang State Local Government Committee chairman Datuk Dr Teng Hock Nan rejected the NGOs' proposal for public hearing. He claimed the council had already played its part in accordance with the law. Those present included MPPP president Datuk Zainal Rahim Seman, project developer Equine Capital Bhd executive chairman Datuk Patrick Lim and 16 representatives from the Residents Association of Jesselton.

Following the 13th General Election on 8 March 2008, the new state government led by Pakatan Rakyat announced in September 2008 that the proposed PGCC project has been rejected by the Penang Municipal due to the failure of the developer in submitting the layout plans on time and complying with the council's requirements. This was confirmed by the council president Datuk Zainal Rahim Seman.

== Members of The PGCC Campaign Group ==
PGCC Campaign Group:

- The Consumers Association of Penang
- Sahabat Alam Malaysia
- Aliran
- Penang Heritage Trust
- Citizens for Public Transport
- Malaysian Nature Society
- Tanjung Bungah Residents Association
- Suara Rakyat Malaysia
- Badan Warisan Malaysia
- Jesselton Heights Residents Association
- Friends of Botanic Gardens

== Notable events ==
- 12 September 2007: Launching of the Penang Global City Centre (PGCC) project.
- 15 September 2007: Six Penang-based NGOs came together to issue a joint statement against the development of the PGCC.
- 7 October 2007: Public Forum on Implications of PGCC on Penangites organised by the PGCC Campaign Group held at Dewan Sri Pinang was attended by approximately 350 Penangites.
- 3 September 2008: New state administration under Pakatan Rakyat announced the cancellation of proposed PGCC project.
