= Asian Racing Federation =

- Abbreviation: ARF
- Established: November 2001; 25 years ago
- Type: Nonprofit
- Legal status: Corporate trust
- Headquarters: Happy Valley Racecourse, One Sports Road, Happy Valley, Hong Kong, China
- Coordinates: 22°16′22″N 114°10′56″E
- Region served: Asia
- Members: 28 member organisations
- Official language: English
- Chairman: Winfried Engelbrecht-Bresges (Chief Executive Officer of the Hong Kong Jockey Club)
- Vice-chairmen: Masayuki Goto (Executive Advisor of Japan Racing Association); Mohammad Saeed Al Shehhi (General Manager and Board Member of Emirates Racing Authority)
- Secretary General: Andrew Harding (Executive Director of Racing of the Hong Kong Jockey Club)
- Affiliations: International Federation of Horseracing Authorities
- Website: asianracing.org

The Asian Racing Federation (ARF) is a regional federation comprising 29 national horse racing authorities and racing-related organisations from across Asia, Oceania, Africa and the Middle East.

The ARF is formally linked with the International Federation of Horseracing Authorities (IFHA). Australia, Hong Kong and Japan have permanent seats representing the ARF on the Executive Council of the IFHA, and the ARF also nominates one of two rotational positions on the IFHA Executive Council.

Established on 24 May 1960 as the Asian Racing Conference (ARC) on the initiative of Japan Racing Association Count Todamasa Sakai, President of the Japan Racing Association and Mr U Chit Khine of the Rangoon Turf Club, the ARF was formally established as a permanent organisation at the 28th ARC in November 2001.

The Executive Council meets four times annually and is currently chaired by Winfried Engelbrecht-Bresges GBS JP.

The ARF has a central Secretariat that is based in Hong Kong at the Hong Kong Jockey Club headquarters in Happy Valley.

== Main members ==
Country	Horseracing authority
Australia	Racing Australia
Bahrain	Rashid Equestrian and Horseracing Club
Hong Kong	Hong Kong Jockey Club
India	Turf Authorities of India
Japan	Japan Racing Association
South Korea	Korea Racing Authority
Malaysia	Malayan Racing Association
New Zealand	New Zealand Thoroughbred Racing Inc.
Oman	Oman Horse Racing Club
Pakistan	Jockey Club of Pakistan
Qatar	Racing and Equestrian Club
Saudi Arabia	Jockey Club of Saudi Arabia
South Africa	National Horseracing Authority of Southern Africa
Thailand	Royal Bangkok Sports Club
Turkey	Jockey Club of Turkey
United Arab Emirates	Emirates Racing Authority

=== Associate Members ===
Country	Horseracing authority
China	Chinese Equestrian Association
Mauritius	Gambling Regulatory Authority
Mongolia	Federation of Mongolian Horseracing Sports and Trainers
Philippines	Philippine Racing Commission

=== Affiliate Members ===
Country	Horseracing authority
China	Chinese Horse Industry Association
Indonesia	Indonesian Thoroughbred Association
Japan	National Association of Racing
Kuwait	Hunting and Equestrian Club
Mauritius	MTC Jockey Club
New Zealand	New Zealand Racing Integrity Board
Philippines	Metro Manila Turf Club
Vietnam	Thien Ma Madagui Racing Joint Stock Company

=== Former Members ===
Country	Horseracing authority	Dissolution
Burma (Now Myanmar)	Rangoon Turf Club	2 March 1962 (1962 Burmese coup d'état)
Macau	Macau Jockey Club	1 April 2024

== List of conferences ==
Since 1960, conferences are held among full member associations every approximately 18 months.

Asian Racing Conference
Year	#	Dates	Country	City	Theme	Ref
1960	1st	24–29 May	Japan	Tokyo		
1961	2nd	September	Malaya; Singapore	Singapore		
1963	3rd	April	Australia			
1964	4th	6–15 November	Philippines	Manila		
1966	5th	January	India			
1967	6th	January	Thailand			
1968	7th	January	New Zealand			
1969	8th	March	Japan			
1970	9th	17–28 September	Malaysia; Singapore			
1972	10th	March	Australia			
1973	11th	May	Turkey			
1974	12th	18–25 November	Philippines	Manila		
1976	13th	December	India			
1978	14th	December	Hong Kong			
1980	15th	September	South Korea			
1982	16th	7–15 January	Thailand	Bangkok		
1984	17th	January	New Zealand			
1985	18th	October	Japan			
1987	19th	12–16 March	Malaysia	Kuala Lumpur		
1987	19th	17–22 March	Singapore	Singapore		
1988	20th	18–25 September	Australia	Sydney		
1990	21st	July	Turkey			
1991	22nd	8–15 December	Hong Kong	Hong Kong		
1993	23rd	22–28 February	Philippines	Manila		
1995	24th	23–30 January	India	Hyderabad and Mumbai		
1997	25th	January	South Africa			
1999	26th	January	Macau			
2000	27th	6–7 March	Singapore	Singapore	Racing into the New Millennium	
2000	27th	8–10 March	Malaysia	Penang, Ipoh and Kuala Lumpur	Racing into the New Millennium	
2001	28th	November	Thailand	Bangkok		
2003	29th	1–6 March	New Zealand	Auckland	Playing Our Part in World Racing	
2005	30th	20–27 May	South Korea	Seoul	Asia's United Vision for World Racing	
2007	31st	21–25 January	United Arab Emirates	Dubai	Racing Without Borders	
2008	32nd	9–14 November	Japan	Tokyo	New Horizons for Racing	
2010	33rd	9–15 April	Australia	Sydney	Racing Into the Future	
2012	34th	16–20 July	Turkey	Istanbul	Bridging Worlds!	
2014	35th	5–8 May	Hong Kong	Hong Kong	Customer. Connect. Compete. Create.	
2016	36th	25–28 January	India	Mumbai	Galloping Ahead Globally	
2018	37th	13–18 May	South Korea	Seoul	Innovate, Collaborate, Transform	
2020	38th	18–23 February	South Africa	Cape Town	Unlocking Potential	
2023	39th	14–19 February	Australia	Melbourne	Breaking Barriers	
2024	40th	27 August-1 September	Japan	Sapporo	Be Connected, Stride Together	
2026	41st	9–14 February	Saudi Arabia	Riyadh	Honouring Tradition, Shaping the Future	
2028	42nd		New Zealand	Auckland		
