= Statue of Robert Sandilands Frowd Walker =

Statue in Taiping, Malaysia

Coordinates: 4°51′38″N 100°44′34″E

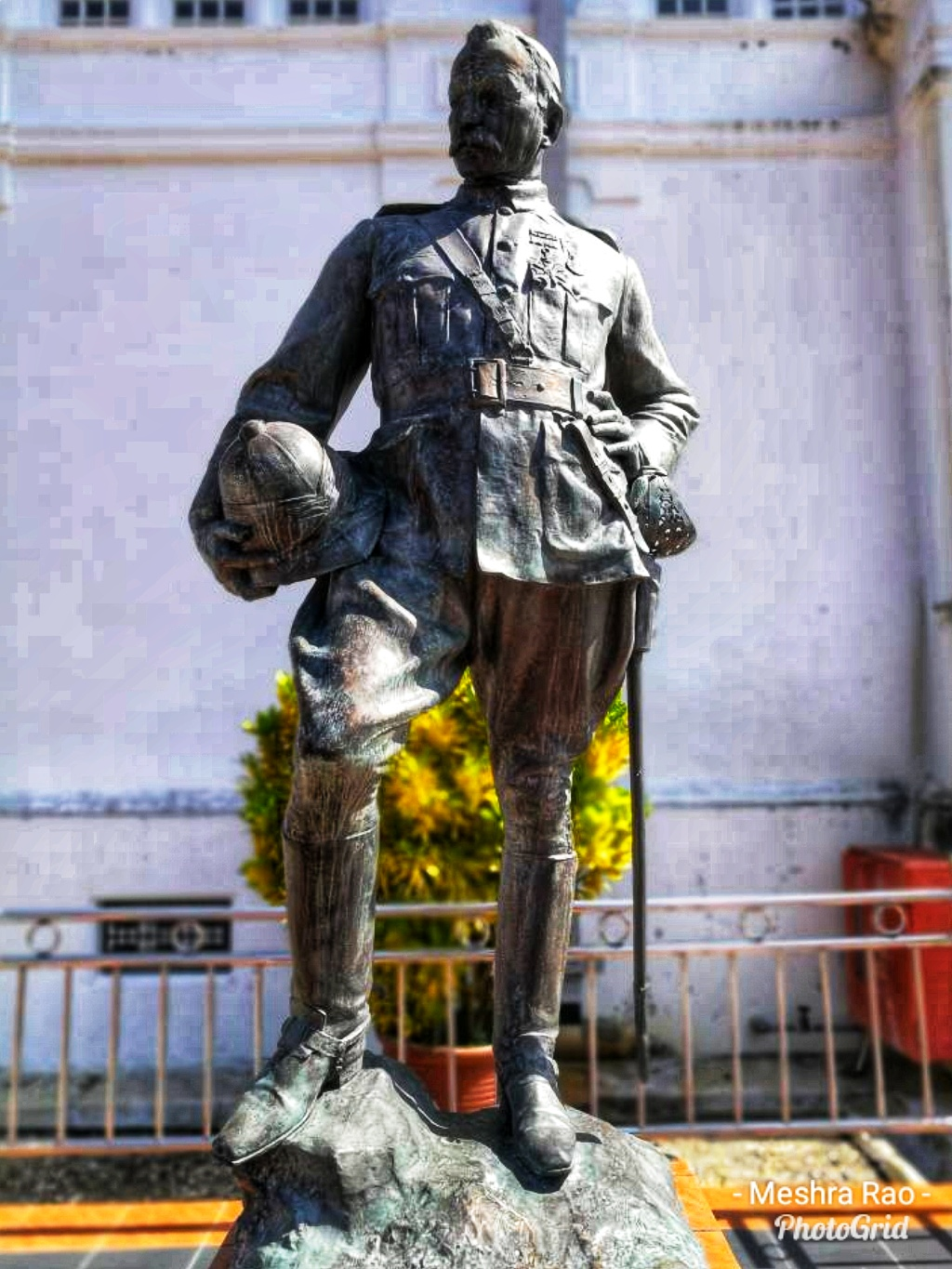
- Artist: Charles Leonard Hartwell
- Year: 1913
- Medium: Bronze statue
- Subject: Robert Sandilands Frowd Walker
- Location: Perak Museum

The statue of Robert Sandilands Frowd Walker CMG (13 May 1850 – 16 May 1917) is situated outside Perak Museum, Jalan Taming Sari, Taiping, Perak, Malaysia.

== History ==
Robert Sandilands Frowd Walker was a British colonial administrator who entered the service of the Federated Malay States in 1879 as acting commissioner of the Perak Armed Police. In 1884 he was appointed commandant of the 1st Perak Sikhs, and in 1896 was employed as commandant of the Malay States Guides, a regiment which he raised and commanded until his retirement in 1910. He was also British Resident, Selangor in 1899, and British Resident, Perak in 1900.

The statue was first suggested by E. W. Birch, British Resident of Perak, in 1909, as a memorial to Walker who had announced his intention to retire the following year after 30 years' service. A memorial fund was established for the purpose, and contributors included the Sultans of Perak and Johor, wealthy Chinese businessmen in Perak, members of the regiment, and his friends and acquaintances.

English sculptor Charles L. Hartwell was commissioned to create the statue and a model of the proposed statue was exhibited in the Royal Academy, London in 1912. Casting was carried out by Messrs. J. W. Singer & Sons, London.

The following year, the statue was erected in Taiping, in the barracks of the Malay State Guides which he had created and commanded, and unveiled on 30 September 1913 by the Sultan of Perak in the presence of the British Resident of Perak, R. G. Watson and members of the regiment. Later, the statue was moved outside the Perak Museum.

== Description ==
The bronze statue shows Walker in the uniform of the regiment of the Malay States Guides wearing the Order of the C.M.G, bareheaded, holding his helmet in his right hand. Two bronze memorial plaques on the pedestal were inscribed with a description of his career, and names of the principal donors.
