= Charles Leonard Hartwell =

English sculptor (1873–1951)

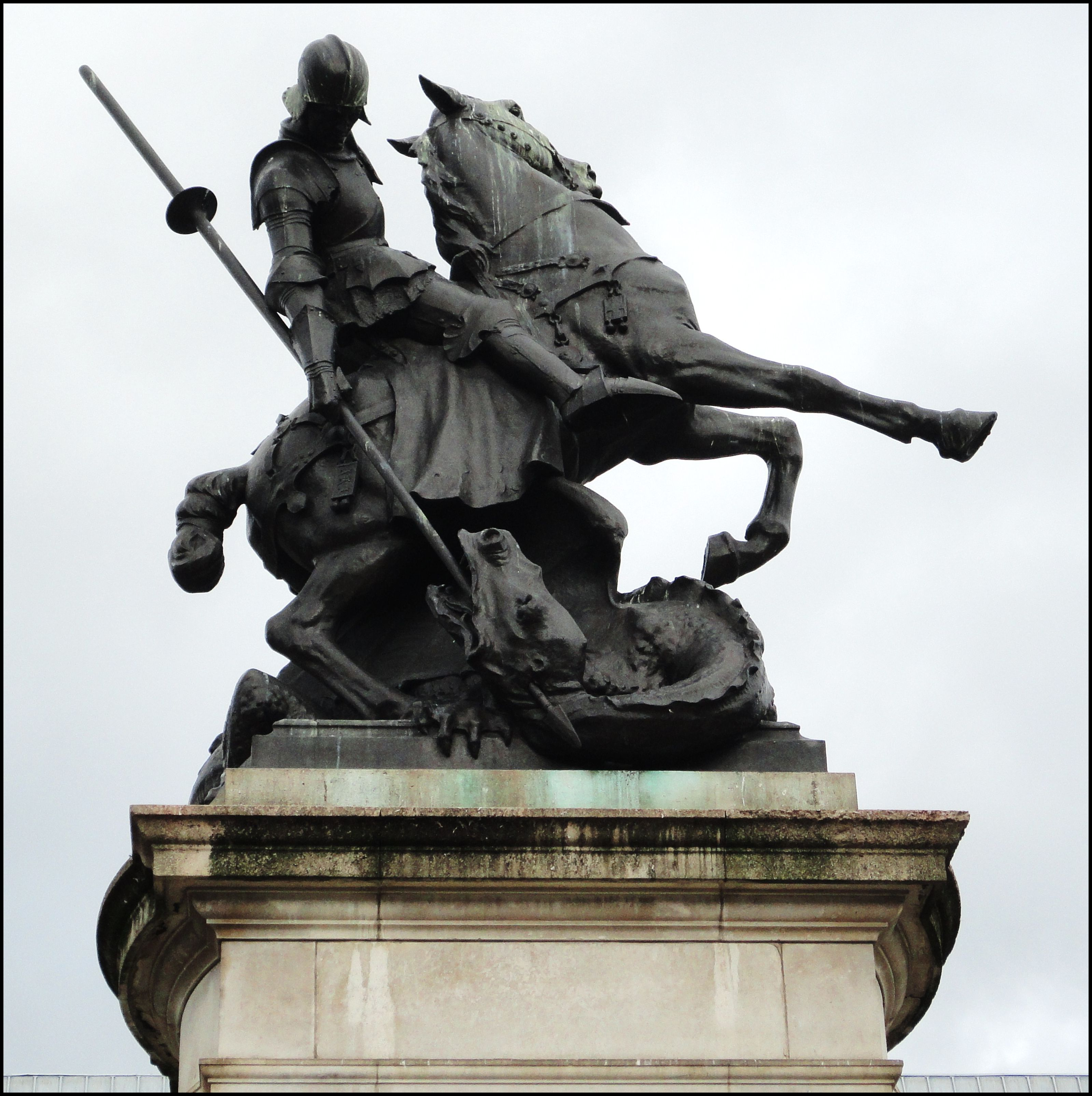
Newcastle version of St George and the Dragon

Charles Leonard Hartwell RA (1 August 1873 – 12 January 1951) was an English sculptor in bronze and marble.

== Life ==
Hartwell was born in Blackheath, London, in 1873. He attended the City and Guilds School in Kennington and won a silver medal for sculpture. From 1896 he attended the Royal Academy Schools and won silver and bronze medals. He also received private tuition from the sculptors Edward Onslow Ford and Hamo Thornycroft. From 1900 he exhibited at the Royal Academy; he was elected Associate of the Royal Academy in 1915 and a Member of the Royal Academy in 1925. In 1929 he won the Royal British Society of Sculptors' silver medal for the sculpture 'The Goatherd's Daughter'. He lived in London and later at Aldwick in West Sussex. He died in 1951.

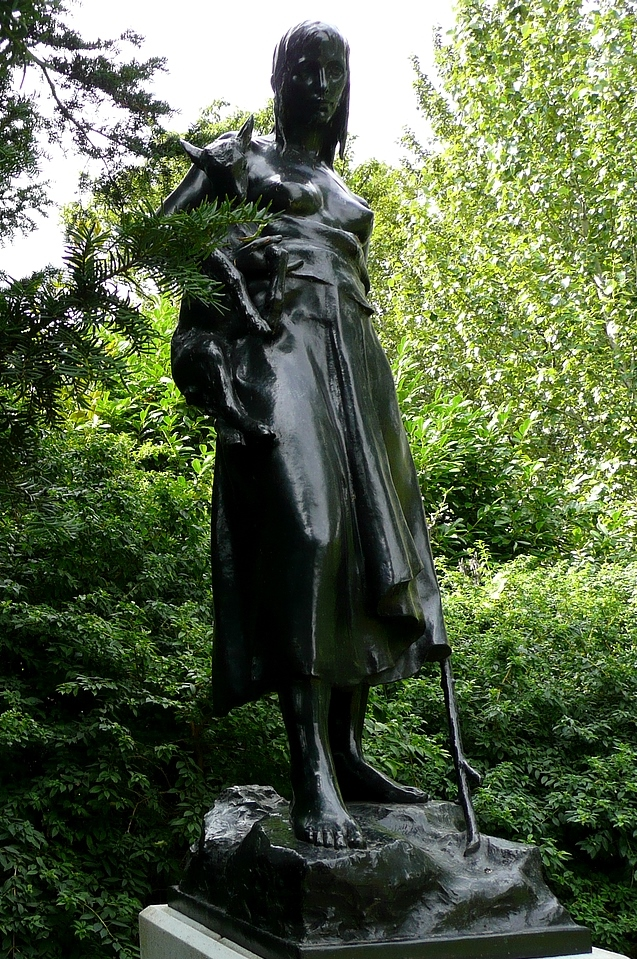
The Goatherd's Daughter, Regent's Park, London

== Works ==
- St Mary-le-bone War Memorial, Lord's Roundabout, St John's Wood, City of Westminster, London NW8: an equestrian St George in the act of dragon-slaying with two relief panels on the stone plinth showing 'Peace' and 'Justice'. Hartwell took on the commission in 1923 after Alfred Drury had withdrawn. Another version at Eldon Square, Newcastle upon Tyne.
- The Goatherd's Daughter, St John's Lodge garden, Regent's Park, London: first exhibited in 1929 and erected on this site in 1931 by the National Council for Animal Welfare, in honour of its founders, Harold and Gertrude Baillie-Weaver.
- Memorial to Admiral Arthur Phillip, Watling Street, London: memorial with bust and reliefs, 1932
- Bronze statue of Robert Sandilands Frowd Walker in Taiping, Perak; it stands today outside the Perak Museum.
- 1904 Bronze Sculpture of a sergeant sounding the charge at Doornkop, Second Boer War "The Bugler" surmounting The Royal Sussex Regiment Memorial, Regency Square Brighton.
