= Selangor Turf Club =

Cricket ground in Serdang, Malaysia

- Kelab Lumba Kuda Selangor
- The club's logo is a yellow horse silhouette within a red oval with yellow outline, that resembles an oval racetrack. The name in Malay - "Kelab Lumba Kuda" is written on top and "Selangor" at the bottom.
- Abbreviation: KLKS, SLTC
- Established: 1896; 130 years ago
- Type: Nonprofit
- Legal status: Corporate trust
- Headquarters: Seri Kembangan, Selangor, Malaysia
- Region served: Selangor
- Official language: English (main)
- Chairman: Tan Sri Richard Chan Hak Lim
- Deputy Chairman: Clement Chew Kuan Hock
- General Manager and Secretary: Kwang Eng Seong
- Affiliations: Malayan Racing Association
- Website: www.selangorturfclub.com

Selangor Turf Club (KLKS or SLTC) is a horse racing Institute with a track and cricket ground located in Seri Kembangan, Serdang, Selangor, Malaysia. It is one of two currently-operating horse-racing Institutes in the country; the other being the Perak Turf Club in Ipoh, Perak.

== History ==
Selangor Turf Club was founded in 1896. For nearly a century, races were conducted at Ampang Road, which is today the site of Petronas Twin Towers, the world's tallest twin skyscrapers.

In 1993, the Club relocated to its present site in Serdang while its previous Ampang Road racecourse made way for the KLCC/Petronas Towers project.

== Sports ground ==
=== Flat racing ground ===
Seri Kembangan Racecourse
- Interactive map of Seri Kembangan Racecourse
- Location: Seri Kembangan, Selangor, Malaysia
- Coordinates: 03°02′44.01″N 101°42′51.83″E
- Owned by: Selangor Turf Club
- Date opened: 1993; 33 years ago
- Capacity: 25,000
- Race type: Flat racing

=== Cricket ground ===
Selangor Turf Club
- Interactive map of Selangor Turf Club

Ground information
- Location: Seri Kembangan, Malaysia
- Country: Malaysia
- Capacity: n/a
- Owner: Selangor Turf Club
- Operator: Selangor Turf Club
- Tenants: Malaysia national cricket team Malaysia women's national cricket team

International information
- First men's T20I: 21 August 2024: Hong Kong v Kuwait
- Last men's T20I: 27 August 2024: Hong Kong v Kuwait
- First women's T20I: 9 August 2018: Malaysia v Singapore
- Last women's T20I: 13 February 2024: Japan v United Arab Emirates
- As of 27 August 2024; Source: Cricinfo

== Triple Crown Series ==
The Selangor Turf Club Triple Crown race series comprises the three Malaysian Group 1 races run at Selangor throughout the year.

1. Tunku Gold Cup (G1) 1200m RM 200,000 (Appox US$51,000)
2. Selangor Gold Cup (G1) 1600m RM 200,000 (Appox US$ 51,000)
3. Piala Emas Sultan Selangor (G1) 2000m RM 400,000 (Appox US$96,000)

However, since its inception in 2003, no horse has won the Triple Crown series. In 2005, Superb Classic trained by Cecil Robert won the first two legs of the series which is as close as any horse has got to winning the Triple Crown. Then, in 2024, Cheval Blanc trained by Frank Maynard won the first and third legs.

== Race tracks ==
The Main Racing Track can cater for distances ranging from 1,200 to 2,400 metres races and 25 metres width and is a left-handed oval-shaped grass track turfed with Zoysia El-Toro turf. The Zoysia El-Toro turf track has a deep-rooted system, which provides a cushion effect for the horses. The track is made up of a profile that incorporates a base drainage layer of gravel perforated by sub-soil pipes with a lower layer of sand and an upper root zone layer. The lower layer helps in the fast drainage of water.

The sand, gravel layer and sub-soil pipes provide a quick and efficient draining of water even during the heavy rainfall. It is very rare to find the Main Racing Track condition going below yielding.

The unique feature of this track is the two elevated bends cambered at an angle of 1 in 11, which enables horses to gallop at full speed into the bend thus gaining momentum before heading for the home straight. This ideal camber has been known to enhance the competitiveness while giving fair opportunity to all the runners regardless of the drawn barrier of the horse.

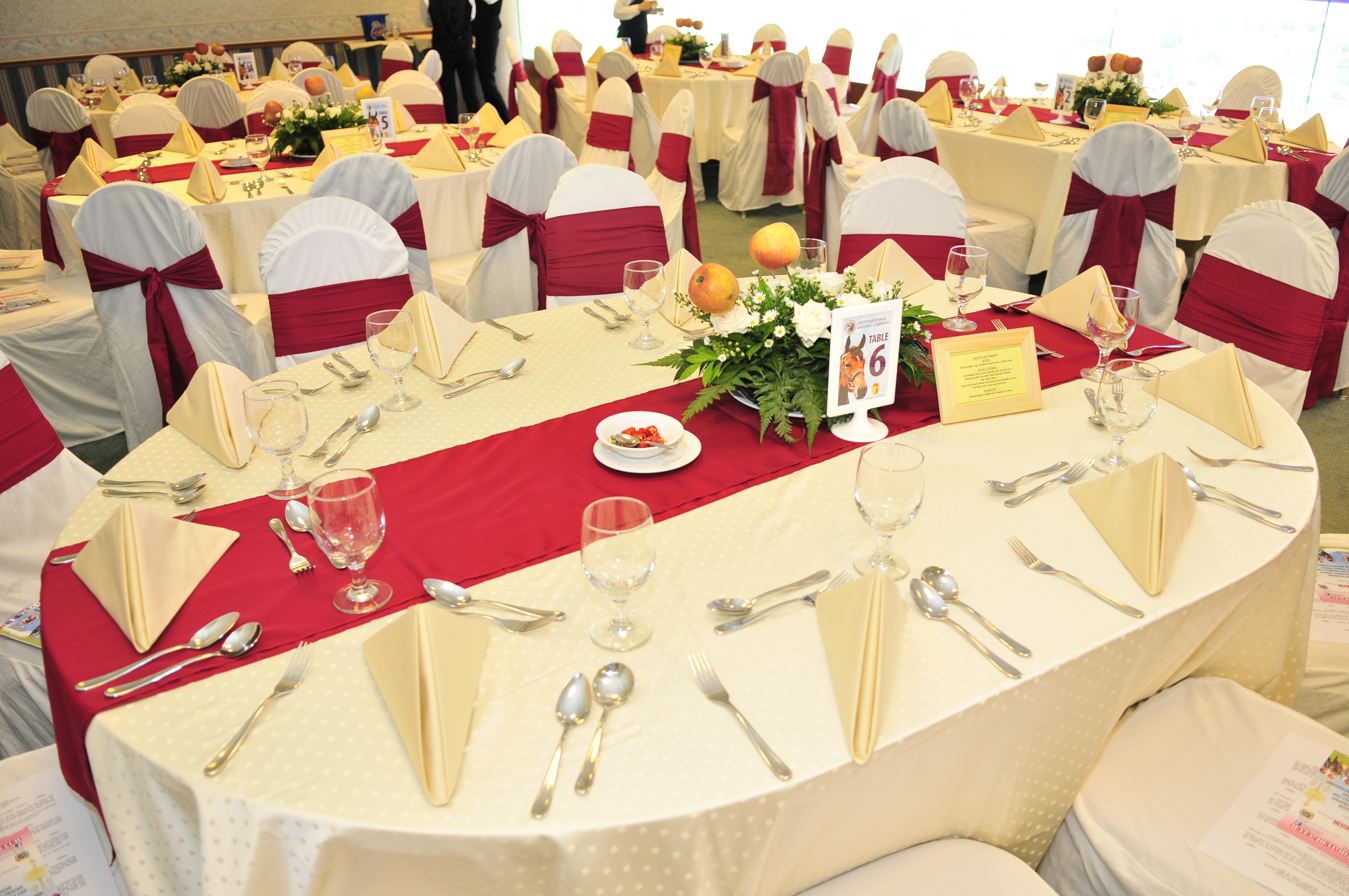
Overlooking the racetrack that comes equipped with advanced audio-visual installations and catering facilities in Selangor Turf Club.

== Location and transport ==
Selangor Turf Club is located in Serdang, just outside the southern border of the Federal Territory of Kuala Lumpur. By car it is accessible via exit 904 of Sungai Besi Expressway, then turn left into Jalan Kuda Emas.

From North–South Expressway Southern Route, Selangor Turf Club is accessible via the second exit (north-bound) after the Sungai Besi toll emptying into Bukit Jalil Highway (FT 217).

The closest railway stations are Serdang Raya Utara MRT station on the Putrajaya line, Sungai Besi LRT station on the Sri Petaling line and Serdang Komuter station on the KTM Komuter Batu Caves-Pulau Sebang line.
