= Turf (cigarette) =

Cigarette brand

Turf was a cigarette brand which was produced during the 1950s in the German Democratic Republic. Turf was sold in 20, 10 and 5-packs. She produced by the traditional "Zigarettenfabrik Jasmatzi", later "VEB Jasmatzi Dresden", which in 1959 merged into the "Vereinigten Zigarettenfabriken Dresden" in Dresden.

== History ==
In 1956, a 20-pack cost 2.00 Deutsche Mark, a 10-pack cost 1.00 mark and a 5-pack cost 50 Pfennig. Turf comes in dark green packaging with a white lettering and white pack with green lettering.

== Slogan ==
A once popular slogan relating to this cigarette brand was "You can see the tombs in the Valley - the smokers of turf and real are." The brand name Turf was also an abbreviation of "Thuringia under Russian thumb" or reinterpreted to "daily under Russian thumb" outside of Thuringia.
