= List of South African flat horse races =

The South African Graded and Black Type races are published each year by the National Horse Racing Authority of South Africa. A number of stakes races also take place which are not graded or granted Black Type and are raced as Non-Black Type races.

== Grade 1 ==
Month	Race	Venue	Age/Sex	Type	Distance	Prize money
December	Gauteng Summer Cup	Turffontein (Turf)	All Horses	Handicap	2000m	R 2 000,000
December	Cape Guineas	Kenilworth (Turf)	3-Year-Olds	Level Weights	1600m	R 1 000,000
December	Cape Fillies Guineas	Kenilworth (Turf)	3-Year-Olds	Level Weights	1600m	R 1 000,000
January	King's Plate formerly Queen's Plate	Kenilworth (Turf)	All Horses	WFA	1600m	R 1 500,000
January	Maine Chance Farms Paddock Stakes	Kenilworth (Turf)	Fillies and Mares	WFA	1800m	R 1 000,000
January	Sun Met	Kenilworth (Turf)	All Horses	WFA	2000m	R 5 000,000
January	Cape Flying Championship	Kenilworth (Turf)	All Horses	WFA	1000m	R 1 000,000
January	Majorca Stakes	Kenilworth (Turf)	Fillies and Mares	WFA	1600m	R 1 000,000
January	Cape Derby	Kenilworth (Turf)	3-Year-Olds	Level Weights	2000m	R 1 000,000
March	South African Classic	Turffontein (Turf)	3-Year-Olds	Level Weights	1800m	R 2 000,000
March	Horse Chestnut Stakes	Turffontein (Turf)	All Horses	WFA	1600m	R 1 000,000
March	South African Fillies Classic	Turffontein (Turf)	3-Year-Old Fillies	Level Weights	1800m	R 1 000,000
April	Empress Club Stakes	Turffontein (Turf)	Fillies and Mares	WFA	1600m	R 1 000,000
April	Premier's Champions Challenge	Turffontein (Turf)	All Horses	Conditions	2000m	R 4 000,000
April	South African Derby	Turffontein (Turf)	3-Year-Olds	Level Weights	2450m	R 2 000,000
April	Computaform Sprint	Turffontein (Turf)	All Horses	WFA	1000m	R 1 000,000
May	Tsogo Sun Sprint	Scottsville	All Horses	Handicap	1200m	R 1 000,000
May	City Of Pietermaritzburg Fillies Sprint	Scottsville	Fillies and Mares	WFA	1200m	R 750,000
May	Gold Medallion	Scottsville	2-Year-Olds	Level Weights	1200m	R 750,000
May	Allan Robertson Championship	Scottsville	2-Year-Old Fillies	Level Weights	1200m	R 750,000
June	Daily News 2000	Greyville (Turf)	3-Year-Olds	Level Weights	2000m	R 2 000,000
June	Woolavington 2000	Greyville (Turf)	3-Year-Old Fillies	Level Weights	2000m	R 1 000,000
June	Gold Challenge	Greyville (Turf)	All Horses	WFA	1600m	R 1 000,000
July	Durban July	Greyville (Turf)	All Horses	Handicap	2200m	R 4 250,000
July	Garden Province Stakes	Greyville (Turf)	Fillies and Mares	WFA	1600m	R 1 000,000
July	Champions Cup	Greyville (Turf)	All Horses	WFA	1800m	R 1 000,000
July	Mercury Sprint	Greyville (Turf)	All Horses	WFA	1200m	R 1 000,000
July	Premiers Champion Stakes	Greyville (Turf)	2-Year-Olds	Level Weights	1600m	R 750,000
July	Thekwini Stakes	Greyville (Turf)	2-Year-Old Fillies	Level Weights	1600m	R 750,000

== Grade 2 ==
Month	Race	Venue	Age/Sex	Type	Distance	Prize money
October	Joburg Spring Challenge	Turffontein (Turf)	All Horses	WFA+Penalties	1450m	ZAR 400,000
October	Joburg Spring F & M Challenge	Turffontein (Turf)	Fillies and Mares	WFA+Penalties	1450m	ZAR 400,000
October	Western Cape Fillies Championship	Kenilworth (Turf)	3-Year-Old Fillies	Conditions	1400m	ZAR 400,000
November	Peermont Emperors Palace Charity Mile	Turffontein (Turf)	All Horses	Handicap	1600m	ZAR 1 000,000
November	Cape Merchants	Kenilworth (Turf)	All Horses	Handicap	1200m	ZAR 400,000
November	Concord Cup	Kenilworth (Turf)	All Horses	Handicap	1600m	ZAR 400,000
November	Dingaans	Turffontein (Turf)	3-Year-Olds	Level Weights	1600m	R 500,000
December	Merchants	Turffontein (Turf)	All Horses	Handicap	1200m	R 450,000
December	Ipi Tombe Challenge	Turffontein (Turf)	Fillies and Mares	Conditions	1600m	R 400,000
December	Green Point Stakes	Kenilworth (Turf)	All Horses	WFA+Penalties	1600m	R 400,000
December	Southern Cross Stakes	Kenilworth (Turf)	Fillies and Mares	WFA+Penalties	1000m	R 400,000
December	Premier Trophy	Kenilworth (Turf)	All Horses	Conditions	1800m	R 400,000
January	Sceptre Stakes	Kenilworth (Turf)	Fillies and Mares	WFA+Penalties	1200m	R 400,000
January	Peninsula Handicap	Kenilworth (Turf)	All Horses	Handicap	1800m	R 400,000
January	Western Cape Stayers	Kenilworth (Turf)	All Horses	Conditions	2800m	R 400,000
February	Diadem Stakes	Kenilworth (Turf)	All Horses	WFA+Penalties	1200m	R 400,000
March	Gauteng Guineas	Turffontein (Turf)	3-Year-Olds	Level Weights	1600m	R 1 000,000
March	Gauteng Fillies Guineas	Turffontein (Turf)	3-Year-Old Fillies	Level Weights	1600m	R 500,000
March	Hawaii Stakes	Turffontein (Turf)	All Horses	Conditions	1400m	R 400,000
April	Senor Santa Stakes	Turffontein (Turf)	All Horses		1200m	R 400,000
April	Colorado King Stakes	Turffontein (Turf)	All Horses	Conditions	2000m	R 400,000
April	South African Nursery	Turffontein (Turf)	2-Year-Olds	Level Weights	1200m	R 1 000,000
April	South African Oaks	Turffontein (Turf)	3-Year-Old Fillies	Level Weights	2450m	R 1 000,000
April	South African Fillies Nursery	Turffontein (Turf)	2-Year-Old Fillies	Level Weights	1200m	R 400,000
April	Gerald Rosenberg Stakes	Turffontein (Turf)	Fillies and Mares	WFA+Penalties	2000m	R 400,000
April	Camellia Stakes	Turffontein (Turf)	Fillies and Mares	Conditions	1200m	R 400,000
May	KZN Guineas	Greyville (Turf)	3-Year-Olds	Level Weights	1600m	R 600,000
May	Drill Hall Stakes	Greyville (Turf)	All Horses	WFA+Penalties	1400m	R 500,000
May	KZN Fillies Guineas	Greyville (Turf)	3-Year-Old Fillies	Level Weights	1600m	R 500,000
May	World Sports Betting 1900	Greyville (Turf)	All Horses	Conditions	1900m	R 500,000
June	Tibouchina Stakes	Greyville (Turf)	Fillies and Mares	WFA+Penalties	1400m	R 400,000
June	Post Merchants	Greyville (Turf)	All Horses	Handicap	1200m	R 400,000
July	Durban Golden Horseshoe	Greyville (Turf)	2-Year-Olds	Level Weights	1400m	R 600,000
July	Golden Slipper	Greyville (Turf)	2-Year-Old Fillies	Level Weights	1400m	R 600,000
July	Gold Bracelet	Greyville (Turf)	Fillies and Mares	WFA+Penalties	2000m	R 400,000

== Grade 3 ==
Month	Race	Venue	Age/Sex	Type	Distance	Prize money
September	Spring Spree Stakes	Turffontein (Turf)	All Horses	Set Weights	1200m	ZAR 250,000
October	Matchem Stakes	Durbanville (Turf)	3/4-Year-Olds	WFA	1400m	ZAR 250,000
October	Diana Stakes	Durbanville (Turf)	3/4-Year-Olds Fil	WFA	1400m	ZAR 250,000
October	Cape Classic	Kenilworth (Turf)	3-Year-Olds	Conditions	1400m	ZAR 250,000
November	Yellowwood Handicap	Turffontein (Turf)	Fillies and Mares	Handicap	1800m	ZAR 250,000
November	Graham Beck Stakes	Turffontein (Turf)	3-Year-Olds	Conditions	1400m	ZAR 250,000
November	Starling Stakes	Turffontein (Turf)	3-Year-Old Fillies	Conditions	1400m	ZAR 250,000
November	Victory Moon Stakes	Turffontein (Turf)*	All Horses	Conditions	1800m	ZAR 400,000
November	Fillies Mile	Turffontein (Turf)	3-Year-Old Fillies	Conditions	1600m	R 275 000
December	Magnolia Handicap	Turffontein (Turf)	Fillies and Mares	Handicap	1200m	R 250,000
December	Cape Summer Stayers Handicap	Kenilworth (Turf)	All Horses	Handicap	2500m	R 250,000
December	Victress Stakes	Kenilworth (Turf)	Fillies and Mares	Conditions	1800m	R 250,000
December	Lebelo Sprint	Turffontein (Turf)	All Horses	Handicap	1000m	R 250,000
December	Flamboyant Stakes	Greyville (Turf)	Fillies and Mares	Conditions	1600m	R 250,000
January	Chairman's Cup	Kenilworth (Turf)	All Horses	Handicap	3200m	R 250,000
January	Politician Stakes	Kenilworth (Turf)	3-Year-Olds	Set Weights	1800m	R 250,000
January	London News Stakes	Turffontein (Turf)	All Horses	Conditions	1800m	R 250,000
February	Tony Ruffel Stakes	Turffontein (Turf)	3-Year-Olds	Conditions	1450m	R 250,000
February	Three Troikas Stakes	Turffontein (Turf)	3-Year-old Fillies	Conditions	1450m	R 250,000
February	Tommy Hotspur Handicap	Turffontein (Turf)	All Horses	Handicap	1000m	R 250,000
February	Vasco Prix Du Cap	Kenilworth (Turf)	Fillies and Mares	Conditions	1400m	R 250,000
March	Acacia Handicap	Turffontein (Turf)	Fillies and Mares	Handicap	1600m	R 250,000
March	Kings Cup	Greyville (Turf)	All Horses	Handicap	1600m	R 250,000
March	Caradoc Gold Cup	Turffontein (Turf)	All Horses	Conditions	2850m	R 250,000
March	Man O' War Sprint	Turffontein (Turf)	3-Year-Olds	Conditions	1100m	R 250,000
March	Protea Stakes	Turffontein (Turf)	2-Year-Olds	Set Weights	1100m	R 200,000
March	Pretty Polly Stakes	Turffontein (Turf)	2-Year-Old Fillies	Set Weights	1100m	R 200,000
April	Sycamore Sprint	Turffontein (Turf)	Fillies and Mares	Handicap	1200m	R 250,000
April	Byerley Turk	Greyville (Polytrack)	3-Year-Olds	Set Weights	1400m	R 250,000
April	Umzimkhulu Stakes	Greyville (Polytrack)	3-Year-Old Fillies	Set Weights	1400m	R 250,000
April	Gold Bowl	Turffontein (Turf)	All Horses	Handicap	3200m	R 500,000
April	Winter Guineas	Kenilworth (Turf)	3-Year-Olds	Level Weights	1600m	R 250,000
April	Poinsettia Stakes	Scottsville	Fillies and Mares	WFA+Penalties	1200m	R 250,000
April	Godolphin Barb Stakes	Scottsville	2-Year-Olds	Set Weights	1100m	R 200,000
April	Strelitzia Stakes	Scottsville	2-Year-Old Fillies	Set Weights	1100m	R 200,000
May	Winter Classic	Kenilworth (Turf)	3-Year-Olds	Level Weights	1800m	R 250,000
June	Lonsdale Stirrup Cup	Greyville (Turf)	All Horses	Handicap	2400m	R 300,000
June	Cup Trial	Greyville (Turf)	All Horses	Handicap	1800m	R 300,000
June	Cape of Good Hope Nursery	Kenilworth (Turf)	2-Year-Olds	Level Weights	1200m	R 200,000
June	Jubilee Handicap	Turffontein (Turf)	All Horses	Handicap	1800m	R 250,000
June	Track And Ball "Derby"	Scottsville	All Horses	WFA+Penalties	2400m	R 300,000
June	Track And Ball "Oaks"	Scottsville	Fillies and Mares	WFA+Penalties	2400m	R 300,000
June	Winter Derby	Kenilworth (Turf)	3-Year-Olds	Level Weights	2400m	R 250,000
July	Gold Vase	Greyville (Turf)	All Horses	Conditions	3000m	R 500,000
July	World Sports Betting 2200	Greyville (Turf)	All Horses	Handicap	2200m	R 500,000
July	Final Fling Stakes	Kenilworth (Turf)	Fillies and Mares	WFA+Penalties	1800m	R 250,000
July	Gold Cup	Greyville (Turf)	All Horses	Handicap	3200m	R 1 250,000
July	Umkhomazi Stakes	Greyville (Turf)	2-Year-Olds	Set Weights	1200m	R 300,000
July	The Debutante	Greyville (Turf)	2-Year-Old Fillies	Set Weights	1200m	R 300,000
July	Champagne Stakes	Kenilworth (Turf)	Fillies and Mares	WFA+Penalties	1200m	R 250,000

== Listed ==
Month	Race	Venue	Age/Sex	Type	Distance	Prize money
August	Jockey Club Stakes	Fairview (Turf)	Fillies and Mares	Conditions	2000m	ZAR 150,000
September	Sophomore Sprint	Durbanville (Turf)	3-Year-Olds	Set Weights	1200m	ZAR 150,000
September	Settlers Trophy	Durbanville (Turf)	All Horses	Handicap	2400m	ZAR 150,000
October	Michaelmas Handicap	Greyville (Turf)	All Horses	Handicap	1900m	ZAR 150,000
October	Racing Association Stakes	Fairview (Turf)	3-Year-Olds	Set Weights	1600m	ZAR 150,000
October	Algoa Cup	Fairview (Turf)	All Horses	Handicap	2000m	ZAR 350,000
November	Golden Loom Handicap	Turffontein (Turf)	All Horses	Handicap	1000m	ZAR 150,000
November	Java Handicap	Turffontein (Turf)	All Horses	Handicap	2400m	ZAR 150,000
November	KZN Guineas Trial	Scottsville	3-Year-Olds	Set Weights	1600m	ZAR 150,000
November	Laisserfaire Stakes	Kenilworth (Turf)	Fillies and Mares	Handicap	1100m	ZAR 150,000
November	Woolavington Handicap	Kenilworth (Turf)	All Horses	Handicap	2400m	ZAR 150,000
November	Gardenia Stakes	Turffontein (Turf)*	Fillies and Mares	Conditions	1000m	ZAR 150,000
December	Racing Association Handicap	Turffontein (Turf)	All Horses	Handicap	3200m	R 250,000
December	Secretariat Stakes	Turffontein (Turf)	3-Year-Olds	Handicap	1400m	R 150,000
December	Memorial Mile	Fairview (Turf)	All Horses	WFA	1600m	R 150,000
December	Southeaster Sprint	Kenilworth (Turf)	All Horses	Handicap	1100m	R 150,000
December	Christmas Handicap	Greyville (Turf)	All Horses	Handicap	1600m	R 250,000
January	Lady's Bracelet	Fairview (Turf)	Fillies and Mares	WFA	1600m	R 150,000
January	Jamaica Handicap	Kenilworth (Turf)	Fillies and Mares	Handicap	2000m	R 150,000
January	Sea Cottage Stakes	Turffontein (Turf)	3-Year-Olds	Conditions	1800m	R 150,000
January	Swallow Stakes	Turffontein (Turf)	3-Year-Old Fillies	Conditions	1200m	R 150,000
January	Michael Roberts Handicap	Scottsville	All Horses	Handicap	1800m	R 150,000
January	Summer Juvenile Stakes	Kenilworth (Turf)	2-Year-Olds	Set Weights	1000m	R 150,000
February	Wolf Power 1600	Turffontein (Turf)	All Horses	Handicap	1600m	R 150,000
February	Lady's Pendant	Fairview (Turf)	Fillies and Mares	Conditions	1200m	R 150,000
February	Kenilworth Cup	Kenilworth (Turf)	All Horses	Handicap	3200m	R 150,000
February	Jet Master Stakes	Kenilworth (Turf)	All Horses	Conditions	1600m	R 150,000
March	Ibhayi Stakes	Fairview (Turf)	3-Year-Olds	Set Weights	1400m	R 150,000
March	Aquanaut Handicap	Turffontein (Turf)	All Horses	Handicap	2400m	R 150,000
March	Breeders Guineas	Fairview (Turf)	3-Year-Old Fillies	Level Weights	1600m	R 150,000
March	Bauhinia Handicap	Turffontein (Turf)	Fillies and Mares	Handicap	1000m	R 150,000
March	Storm Bird Stakes	Turffontein (Turf)	2-Year-Olds	Set Weights	1000m	R 150,000
March	Ruffian Stakes	Turffontein (Turf)	2-Year-Old Fillies	Set Weights	1000m	R 150,000
March	Drum Star Handicap	Turffontein (Turf)	All Horses	Handicap	1800m	R 150,000
March	East Cape Fillies Nursery	Fairview (Turf)	2-Year-Old Fillies	Level Weights	1200m	R 150,000
March	East Cape Sprint Cup	Fairview (Turf)	All Horses	WFA	1200m	R 150,000
March	East Cape Guineas	Fairview (Turf)	3-Year-Olds	Level Weights	1600m	R 150,000
March	Jacaranda Handicap	Turffontein (Turf)	Fillies and Mares	Handicap	1800m	R 250,000
March	KwaZulu-Natal Stakes	Scottsville	Fillies and Mares	Conditions	1000m	R 150,000
April	Derby Trial	Turffontein (Turf)	3-Year-Olds	Handicap	2000m	R 150,000
April	Oaks Trial	Turffontein (Turf)	3-Year-Old Fillies	Handicap	2000m	R 150,000
April	East Cape Oaks	Fairview (Turf)	3-Year-Old Fillies	Level Weights	2000m	R 150,000
April	Spook Express Handicap	Turffontein (Turf)	Fillies and Mares	Handicap	2400m	R 150,000
April	The Sledgehammer	Scottsville	All Horses	Conditions	1750m	R 150,000
April	The Scarlet Lady	Scottsville	Fillies and Mares	Conditions	1750m	R 150,000
April	East Cape Nursery	Fairview (Turf)	2-Year-Olds	Level Weights	1200m	R 150,000
April	Sweet Chestnut Stakes	Kenilworth (Turf)	3-Year-Old Fillies	Level Weights	1400m	R 150,000
April	In Full Flight Handicap	Scottsville	All Horses	Handicap	1100m	R 150,000
May	Somerset 1200	Kenilworth (Turf)	2-Year-Olds	Set Weights	1200m	R 125 000
May	Perfect Promise Sprint	Kenilworth (Turf)	2-Year-Old Fillies	Set Weights	1200m	R 125 000
May	East Cape Derby	Fairview (Turf)	3-Year-Olds	Level Weights	2400m	R 350,000
May	Dahlia Plate	Fairview (Turf)	2-Year-Olds	Set Weights	1200m	R 150,000
May	East Coast Cup	Fairview (Turf)	Fillies and Mares	Handicap	2000m	R 150,000
May	Syringa Handicap	Turffontein (Turf)	Fillies and Mares	Handicap	1600m	R 150,000
May	Glenlair Trophy	Fairview (Turf)	All Horses	Handicap	3200m	R 150,000
May	Olympic Duel Stakes	Kenilworth (Turf)	Fillies and Mares	Handicap	1200m	R 150,000
May	Stormsvlei Mile	Kenilworth (Turf)	3-Year-Old Fillies	Level Weights	1600m	R 150,000
May	Milkwood Stakes	Fairview (Turf)	Fillies and Mares	Handicap	1000m	R 150,000
June	Lady's Slipper Stakes	Fairview (Turf)	2-Year-Old Fillies	Level Weights	1400m	R 150,000
June	Gatecrasher Stakes	Greyville (Polytrack)	2-Year-Olds	Set Weights	1400m	R 150,000
June	Devon Air Stakes	Greyville (Polytrack)	2-Year-Old Fillies	Set Weights	1400m	R 150,000
June	Kenilworth Fillies Nursery	Kenilworth (Turf)	2-Year-Old Fillies	Level Weights	1200m	R 200,000
June	Port Elizabeth Gold Cup	Fairview (Turf)	All Horses	Handicap	3600m	R 150,000
June	East Cape Breeders Stakes	Fairview (Turf)	Fillies and Mares	Conditions	1200m	R 150,000
June	Langerman	Kenilworth (Turf)	2-Year-Olds	Level Weights	1500m	R 200,000
June	Ladies Mile	Kenilworth (Turf)	Fillies and Mares	Set Weights	1600m	R 150,000
June	Winter Oaks	Kenilworth (Turf)	3-Year-Old Fillies	Level Weights	2200m	R 150,000
June	Iridescence Stakes	Kenilworth (Turf)	2-Year-Old Fillies	Level Weights	1500m	R 125 000
July	Champion Juvenile Cup	Fairview (Turf)	2-Year-Olds	Level Weights	1400m	R 200,000
July	Thukela Handicap	Greyville (Polytrack)	All Horses	Handicap	1600m	R 150,000
July	East Cape Paddock Stakes	Fairview (Turf)	Fillies and Mares	Conditions	1600m	R 150,000
July	Off to Stud Stakes	Greyville (Turf)	4-Year-Old+F&M	Conditions	1600m	R 150,000
July	Umngeni Handicap	Greyville (Polytrack)	All Horses	Handicap	1000m	R 150,000
July	The Darley Arabian	Greyville (Polytrack)	3-Year-Olds	Set Weights	1600m	R 150,000

== Non-Black Type ==
Month	Race	Venue	Age/Sex	Type	Distance	Prize Money
August	Wedgewood Handicap	Fairview (Turf)	Fillies and Mares	Handicap	2400m	ZAR 110,000
August	RA Flamingo Mile	Flamingo Park (Sand)	All Horses	Handicap	1600m	ZAR 200,000
August	World Sports Betting Sprint	Flamingo Park (Sand)	All Horses	Handicap	1000m	ZAR 135 000
August	RA Diamond Stakes	Flamingo Park (Sand)	All Horses	Handicap	2200m	ZAR 110,000
August	Speedsters Stakes	Fairview (Turf)	All Horses	Handicap	1000m	ZAR 110,000
August	Founders Trophy	Fairview (Polytrack)	All Horses	Handicap	1600m	ZAR 110,000
September	The Ladies Stakes	Turffontein (Turf)	Fillies and Mares	Set Weights	1200m	ZAR 125 000
September	Walmer Handicap	Fairview (Polytrack)	Fillies and Mares	Handicap	1800m	ZAR 110,000
September	Fairview 1800	Fairview (Polytrack)	All Horses	Conditions	1800m	ZAR 110,000
September	The Grand Heritage	Vaal (Turf)	All Horses	Conditions	1475m	ZAR 750,000
September	Heritage Consolation Handicap	Vaal (Turf)	All Horses	Handicap	1475m	ZAR 250,000
September	Heritage 1200 Handicap	Vaal (Turf)	All Horses	Handicap	1200m	ZAR 150,000
September	Heritage 1200 F & M Handicap	Vaal (Turf)	Fillies and Mares	Handicap	1200m	ZAR 150,000
September	Sophomore 1000	Vaal (Turf)	3-Year-Olds	Conditions	1000m	ZAR 135 000
October	KZN Fillies Guineas Trial	Greyville (Turf)	3-Year-Old Fillies	Set Weights	1600m	ZAR 130,000
October	Cradock Place Stakes	Fairview (Turf)	All Horses	Conditions	1200m	ZAR 110,000
November	Emperor's Palace Ready to Run Cup (CTS)	Turffontein (Turf)	3-Year-Olds	Level Weights	1400m	ZAR 500,000
November	Cape Mile	Kenilworth (Turf)	All Horses	Conditions	1600m	ZAR 150,000
November	November Stakes (Poly)	Fairview (Polytrack)	All Horses	Conditions	1400m	ZAR 110,000
November	Ready to Run Stakes	Kenilworth (Turf)	3-Year-Olds	Level Weights	1400m	ZAR 2 500,000
November	Glendore Sprint	Fairview (Polytrack)	All Horses	Conditions	1000m	R 110,000
December	KZN Summer Challenge 1200	Scottsville	All Horses	Handicap	1200m	R 200,000
December	KZN Summer Challenge 1600	Scottsville	All Horses	Handicap	1600m	R 200,000
December	KZN Summer Challenge 2000	Scottsville	All Horses	Handicap	2000m	R 200,000
December	Need For Speed Sprint	Kenilworth (Turf)	3-Year-Olds	Conditions	1000m	R 150,000
December	River Indigo Handicap	Greyville (Turf)	Fillies and Mares	Handicap	1400m	R 130,000
January	African Holly Handicap	Scottsville	All Horses	Handicap	1000m	R 130,000
January	Flamingo Park Sprint	Flamingo Park (Sand)	All Horses	Handicap	1200m	R 110,000
January	Aloe Handicap (Poly)	Fairview (Polytrack)	3-Year-Old Fillies	Handicap	1300m	R 110,000
January	Fairview Merchants	Fairview (Turf)	All Horses	Handicap	1200m	R 110,000
January	The CTS 1200	Kenilworth (Turf)	3-Year-Olds	Level Weights	1200m	5 000,000
January	The CTS 1600	Kenilworth (Turf)	3-Year-Olds	Level Weights	1600m	5 000,000
January	Kuda Sprint	Kenilworth (Turf)	2-Year-Olds	Level Weights	1200m	350,000
January	Marula Sprint	Scottsville	All Horses	Conditions	1200m	R 130,000
February	Fairview Mile	Fairview (Turf)	All Horses	Conditions	1600m	R 110,000
February	Allez France Stakes	Turffontein (Turf)	Fillies and Mares	Conditions	2200m	R 135 000
February	Kimberley 1400	Flamingo Park (Sand)	All Horses	Handicap	1400m	R 110,000
February	umThombothi Stakes	Scottsville	All Horses	Conditions	2000m	R 130,000
February	Fever Tree Handicap	Scottsville	All Horses	Handicap	1400m	R 130,000
March	Flamingo Park Handicap	Flamingo Park (Sand)	All Horses	Handicap	1800m	R 110,000
March	Gold Rush Sprint	Turffontein (Turf)	3-Year-Olds	Handicap	1100m	R 150,000
March	Sun Chariot Handicap	Turffontein (Turf)	Fillies and Mares	Handicap	2400m	R 135 000
March	Egoli Mile	Turffontein (Turf)	3-Year-Olds	Handicap	1600m	R 135 000
March	Lakeside Handicap	Fairview (Turf)	All Horses	Handicap	2400m	R 110,000
March	EC P oly Challenge	Fairview (Polytrack)	All Horses	Conditions	1200m	R 110,000
March	Sentinel Stakes	Scottsville	2-Year-Olds	Set Weights	1000m	R 150,000
April	Northern Cape Stayers Handicap	Flamingo Park (Sand)	All Horses	Handicap	2200m	R 110,000
April	EC Poly Challenge	Fairview (Polytrack)	All Horses	Conditions	1400m	R 110,000
April	Fairview Flying Five	Fairview (Turf)	All Horses	Conditions	1000m	R 110,000
April	Highland Night Cup	Scottsville	All Horses	Conditions	2400m	R 130,000
May	EC Poly Challenge	Fairview (Polytrack)	All Horses	Conditions	1600m	R 110,000
May	Kimberley Classic	Flamingo Park (Sand)	3-Year-Olds	Handicap	1600m	R 110,000
May	Fairview 1400	Fairview (Turf)	All Horses	Conditions	1400m	R 110,000
June	Durban Dash (Poly)	Greyville (Polytrack)	3-Year-Olds	Conditions	1100m	R 150,000
June	KZN Winter Challenge 1200	Greyville (Polytrack)	All Horses	Handicap	1200m	R 200,000
June	KZN Winter Challenge 1600	Greyville (Polytrack)	All Horses	Handicap	1600m	R 200,000
June	KZN Winter Challenge 2000	Greyville (Polytrack)	All Horses	Handicap	2000m	R 200,000
June	KZN Breeders Million Mile	Greyville (Polytrack)	3-Year-Olds+	Conditions	1600m	R 1 000,000
June	KZN Breeders 1200 (Poly)	Greyville (Polytrack)	All Horses	Conditions	1200m	R 200,000
June	KZN Breeders 1200 F&M (Poly)	Greyville (Polytrack)	Fillies and Mares	Conditions	1200m	R 200,000
June	KZN Breeders 1600 (Poly)	Greyville (Polytrack)	All Horses	Conditions	1600m	R 200,000
June	KZN Breeders 1600 F&M (Poly)	Greyville (Polytrack)	Fillies and Mares	Conditions	1600m	R 200,000
June	KZN Breeders 1900 (Poly)	Greyville (Polytrack)	All Horses	Conditions	1900m	R 200,000
June	KZN Breeders Juvenile Plate (Poly)	Greyville (Polytrack)	2-Year-Olds	Conditions	1200m	R 200,000
June	KZN Breeders Fillies Juvenile Plate (Poly)	Greyville (Polytrack)	2-Year-Old Fillies	Conditions	1200m	R 200,000
July	Ethekwini Sprint	Greyville (Polytrack)	3-Year-Olds	Conditions	1200m	R 130,000
July	KZN Yearling Sale Million	Greyville (Polytrack)	2-Year-Olds	Level Weights	1300m	R 1 000,000
July	Queen Palm Stakes	Greyville (Polytrack)	Fillies and Mares	Conditions	2400m	R 150,000
July	Kimberley Nursery	Flamingo Park (Sand)	2-Year-Olds	Set Weights	1400m	R 110,000
July	Friendly City Stakes	Fairview (Turf)	All Horses	Conditions	1800m	R 110,000
