= Perak Coronation Cup =

- Class: Malayan Classic
- Location: Perak Turf Club; Ipoh, Perak, Malaysia
- Inaugurated: 1985
- Race type: Thoroughbred - Flat racing
- Website: The Perak Turf Club

Race information
- Distance: 1600 meters (1 mile or 8 furlongs)
- Surface: Turf
- Track: Left-handed
- Qualification: Three-year-olds & up
- Weight: Weight-for-age
- Purse: RM700,000

The Perak Coronation Cup is a Malaysian Thoroughbred horse race run annually since 1985 at the Perak Turf Club racecourse in Ipoh, Perak. Held during the third week of November, the 1600 meter (1 mile or 8 furlongs) race on turf is open to horses age three and older. Due to repairs to the racecourse, the 1997 race had to be run at a distance of 1800 meters.

The Coronation Cup was inaugurated in 1985 to commemorate the installation of Azlan Shah as the Sultan of Perak.

== Milestones ==
W. K. Seow won the Coronation Cup as a jockey in 1987 then ten years later as a trainer.

In 2000, Catherine Treymane became the first female jockey to win the race.

== Records ==
Speed record:

- 1:34.7 - King's Seal (1993)

Most wins:

- 2 - Confluence (2002, 2003)
- 2 - Golden Ace † (2005, 2006)
- 2 - Speed Baby (2010, 2012)

Most wins by an owner:

- 3 - Confidence Stable (1996, 2002, 2003)

Most wins by a jockey:

- 4 - Azhar Ismail (1990, 1991, 1998, 2012)
- 4 - J De Souza (2013, 2014, 2018, 2023)

Most wins by a trainer:

- 3 - Francis Nathan (1996, 2002, 2003)

== Winners ==
Year	Winner	Jockey	Trainer	Owner	Time
2025	Good Star	R. Shafiq	T. Mahadi	Omniarch	1:41.2
2024	Mega Gems	A.K. Lim	W.C. Lim	MG Stable	1:34.9
2023	Good Fight	J De Souza	S. Dunderdale	Pavitra Gallop	1:38.7
2022	Elite Remarkable	K.C. Tham	V. Sivan	Leong Mee Fong	1:37.8
2019	Sacred Empire	C.K. Khaw	F. Maynard	Raffles Racing Stable	1:42.7
2018	Ready To Rock	J De Souza	R. Lines	Premier Racing Stable	1:37.6
2017	Tilsworth Freddie	W.K. Yan	P. Lee	Ho Ho Ho Stable	1:39.4
2016	Truson	Lou Ho	S. Cook	Buffalo No 2 Stable	1:38.0
2014	Good Baby	J De Souza	C. C. Ooi	Golden Knight Stable	1:39.0
2013	Taichi Master	J De Souza	R. Lines	Tivic Stable	1:36.1
2012	Speed Baby	Azhar Ismail	K. Coetzee	Super Singh Stable	1:40.6
2011	Fox Command	H. S. Gill	B. T. Lim	Fox Chase Stable	1:39.3
2010	Speed Baby	J. Lim	K. Coetzee	Super Singh Stable	1:37.7
2009	Kiko's Return	Benny Woodworth	B. T. Lim	Ong Stable	1:43.3
2008	Triple Luck	Chan Cheok Fong	Simon Liew	Mdm Kong Sau Leng	1:40.0
2007	Free Spirit	Saimee Jumaat	Chong Keng Leong	Lucky Nine Stable	1:37.3
2006	Golden Ace †	Ronald Woodworth	Prakhash Pereira	Luckily Stable	1:40.7
2005	Golden Ace †	Leong Yoon Fei	Prakhash Pereira	Prakhash Pereira	1:41.3
2004	Flying Diamond	Grant Cooksley	John McGillivray	LT Stable	1:42.9
2003	Confluence	Oscar Chavez	Francis Nathan	Confidence Stable	1:47.6
2002	Confluence	Saimee Jumaat	Francis Nathan	Confidence Stable	1:41.4
2001	Baby Tycoon	Benny Woodworth	K Velu	L H Chan	1:43.1
2000	Ballistic	Catherine Treymane	Tan Soo Beng	Index Link Stable	1:40.3
1999	Golconda	Saimee Jumaat	Chong Keng Leong	Sunshine Eight Stable	1:42.6
1998	Rosebery	Azhar Ismail	Michael Kent	Rosebery Stable	1:38.6
1997	Fire Phoenix II	Saifudin Ismail	W. K . Seow	Mylee Stable	1:48.7
1996	Confidence V	Sofhan Latif	Francis Nathan	Confidence Stable	1:42.1
1995	Exciting Review	P. K. Yeap	Donald Baertschiger	Review Stable	1:42.0
1994	The Best In Town	Grant Cooksley	Donald Baertschiger	The Best In Town Stable	1:42.1
1993	King's Seal	SY Leong	Ahmad Samad	Perfectum Stable	1:34.7
1992	Winning Touch	Gavin Eades	J Ho	T & T Stable	1:36.2
1991	Dynamite Trio	Azhar Ismail	J Kok	Cavalier Stable	1:40.4
1990	Sombre Legend	Azhar Ismail	J Ho	Kua Si Hoo	1:43.7
1989	World Court	P. K. Yeap	Malcolm Thwaites	Easy Stable	1:35.7
1988	Elcarim	Gary Grylls	M Ho	Elcarim Stable	1:35.7
1987	He's Dawan	W. K. Seow	Malcolm Thwaites	He's Dawan Stable	1:42.0
1986	Deer Hunter	Khuang Liang Oo	John Rodgers	BLDG Stable	1:41.7
1985	Big Chief	Declan Murphy	Ivan W. Allan	Dato Amar et al.	1:41.2

- † Bred in Australia, Golden Ace was originally named Foreign Footsteps.
- There was no race in 2015, 2020, 2021
