= Turf Club, Gauteng =

Turf Club
- Location within Gauteng Location within South Africa
- Coordinates: 26.248°S 28.032°E
- Country: South Africa
- Province: Gauteng
- Municipality: City of Johannesburg
- Main Place: Johannesburg
- Established: 1923

Area
  - Total: 0.19 km^{2} (0.073 sq mi)

Population (2011)
  - Total: 1,862
  - Density: 9,800/km^{2} (25,000/sq mi)

Racial makeup (2011)
  - Black African: 74.9%
  - Coloured: 6.2%
  - Indian/Asian: 1.7%
  - White: 15.8%
  - Other: 1.3%

First languages (2011)
  - English: 22.1%
  - Zulu: 19.9%
  - Afrikaans: 13.8%
  - Xhosa: 12.5%
  - Other: 31.8%
- Time zone: UTC+2 (SAST)
- Postal code (street): 2190

Turf Club is a suburb of Johannesburg, South Africa. It is a small suburb south of the Johannesburg CBD and located next to the suburb of Turffontein. It is located in Region F of the City of Johannesburg Metropolitan Municipality.

== History ==
Prior to the discovery of gold on the Witwatersrand in 1886, the suburb lay on land on one of the original farms called Turffontein. It became a suburb in 1923 and its name originates from the nearby Turffontein Racecourse.
