= Perak Turf Club =

Horse racing facility in Ipoh, Perak, Malaysia

- Kelab Lumba Kuda Perak
- The logo is an abbreviation of the Turf Club name in Malay – KLKP. The black letters K, L and K superimpose in the middle of a green letter P, which resembles a Turf Track.
- Abbreviation: KLKP, PRTC
- Established: 1884
- Type: Nonprofit
- Legal status: Corporate trust
- Headquarters: Jalan Raja Di Hilir, Ipoh, Perak, Malaysia
- Region served: Perak
- Official language: English (main)
- Chairman: John Lim Ewe Khuan
- Deputy Chairman: Velluppillai Williams Balasingam
- Chief Executive Officer: Tan Kah Soon
- General Manager and Secretary: Lai Hah Wan
- Affiliations: Malayan Racing Association
- Website: www.perakturfclub.my

Ipoh Racecourse
- Interactive map of Ipoh Racecourse
- Location: Ipoh, Perak, Malaysia
- Coordinates: 4°35′25.69″N 101°6′12.41″E
- Owned by: Perak Turf Club
- Date opened: 1913; 113 years ago
- Capacity: 5,000
- Race type: Flat racing

Perak Turf Club (PRTC or KLKP) is the major Thoroughbred horse racing institute in Ipoh, Perak, Malaysia. The Club is a affiliated with the Malayan Racing Association. The Perak Turf Club was established in 1884; it was the first exclusive turf club ever built in Perak. The establishment of the Perak Turf Club at Taiping was the idea of Sir Frank Swettenham, who was passionate about horse racing. The new race course was located at Waterfall Road, later changed to Race Course Road, near the Lake Gardens. It held ordinary racing in the Federated Malay States—the major tournaments held at Penang, Selangor or Singapore. In 1906, it had a membership of about 250. The present course is at Waterfall Road, Taiping, which is 7 furlongs in length. There was an old course, situated about three miles away from Taiping, at which the current races were then run. In 1886, Burma ponies provided most of the racing and the meetings were primarily social functions. The turf club was the only club that attracted people of all classes, especially the Chinese, to mingle around, because of the sweepstakes and lotteries, as they preferred to gamble as their favourite pastime. Sir E.W. Birch, a racing enthusiast, would travel to distant Turf Clubs just to join the major tournament, and was crucial to developing racing interest in the area. In 1913, when the importance of Taiping had declined below that of Ipoh, the club was shifted to Ipoh, still bearing the same name.

The Club's major annual races are:

- Perak Coronation Cup
- Perak Derby
- Sultan Gold Vase

== See also ==
- Taiping Clubs
