= List of Non-EPC countries' horse races =

This is a list of countries within Europe which are not part of the European Pattern Committee. All of the following races are classified within of their respective racing district, with international races recognised in bold.

== Austria ==
Month	Race Name	Racecourse	Local Grade	Dist. (m)	Age/Sex
September	Österreichisches Galopper-Derby (Austrian Derby)	Ebreichsdorf	AUT Listed	2200	3yo c&f
September	St. Leger	Freudenau	AUT Grade III	2800	3yo +

== Belgium ==
Month	Race Name	Racecourse	Local Grade	Dist. (m)	Age/Sex
July	Prijs Prince Rose	Ostend	BEL Listed	2100	4yo +
December	Open de Mons	Mons	BEL Listed	1500	3yo +

The Open de Mons is run over an all-weather track at Mons.

== Czech Republic ==
Month	Race Name	Racecourse	Local Grade	Dist. (m)	Age/Sex
May	Jarní cena klisen (Czech 1000 Guineas)	Prague	CZE Listed	1600	3yo f
May	Velká jarní cena (Czech 2000 Guineas)	Prague	CZE Listed	1600	3yo
June	České Derby	Prague	CZE Grade 3	2400	3yo
July	České Oaks	Most	CZE Listed	2400	3yo f
August	Český St. Leger	Prague	CZE Listed	2800	3yo
September	Velká cena ceského Turfu	Prague	CZE Listed	2400	3yo +
September	Velká cena Prahy	Prague	CZE Listed	1600	3yo +
September	Cena Zimní královny	Karlovy Vary	CZE Listed	1600	2yo f
October	Cena zimního favorita	Prague	CZE Listed	1600	2yo

== Hungary ==
Month	Race Name	Racecourse	Local Grade	Dist. (m)	Age/Sex
May	Batthyány-Hunyady Díj	Budapest	HUN Grade 2	1600	3yo +
May	Hazafi Díj (Hungarian 1000 Guineas)	Budapest	HUN Grade 2	1600	3yo f
May	Nemzeti Díj (Hungarian 2000 Guineas)	Budapest	HUN Grade 2	1600	3yo c&f
May	Millenniumi Díj	Budapest	HUN Grade 1	1800	3yo +
June	Alagi Díj	Budapest	HUN Grade 2	2000	3yo c&f
July	Magyar Derby (Hungarian Derby)	Budapest	HUN Grade 1	2400	3yo c&f
August	Magyar Kancadíj	Budapest	HUN Grade 2	2400	3yo f
August	Kozma Ferenc Emlékverseny	Budapest	HUN Grade 2	1200	3yo +
August	Kisbér Díj	Budapest	HUN Grade 2	2000	3yo +
September	Kincsem Díj	Budapest	HUN Grade 1	2400	3yo +
September	Imperiál Díj	Budapest	HUN Grade 2	1600	3yo +
September	Overdose Díj	Budapest	HUN Grade 2	1000	3yo +
September	Kovács Mihály Emlékverseny (3yo Grand Prix)	Budapest	HUN Grade 2	2400	3yo
September	Gróf Károlyi Gyula Emlékverseny	Budapest	HUN Grade 3	1300	2yo f
September	Gróf Széchenyi István Emlékverseny	Budapest	HUN Grade 2	2400	3yo+ f
October	Szent László Díj	Budapest	HUN Grade 2	1400	2yo c&f
October	Magyar St. Leger	Budapest	HUN Grade 2	2800	3yo c&f
October	Kállai Pál Emlékverseny (Budapesti Díj)	Budapest	HUN Grade 3	1400	2yo +
October	Kétévesek Kritériuma	Budapest	HUN Grade 3	1600	2yo c&f
October	Lovaregyleti Díj	Budapest	HUN Grade 2	2800	3yo +

== Spain ==
Month	Race Name	Racecourse	Local Grade	Dist. (m)	Age/Sex
April	Gran Premio Valderas/Poule de Potrancas	Madrid	SPA Category A	1600	3yo f
April	Gran Premio Cimera/Poule de Potros	Madrid	SPA Category A	1600	3yo c
April	Gran Premio Duque de Alburquerque	Madrid	SPA Category A	2000	4yo +
May	Gran Premio Nacional	Madrid	SPA Category A	2200	3yo
May	Gran Premio Beamonte/Oaks Español	Madrid	SPA Category A	2400	3yo f
May/June	Gran Premio Villapadierna/Derby Español	Madrid	SPA Category A	2400	3yo
June	Gran Premio Claudio Carudel	Madrid	SPA Category A	1600	3yo +
June	Gran Premio de Madrid	Madrid	Listed	2500	3yo +
August	Gran Premio Hotel Maria Cristina (formerly Kutxa)	San Sebastián	SPA Category A	2200	3yo+ f
August	Copa de Oro de San Sebastián	San Sebastián	Listed	2400	3yo +
August	Gran Premio Gobierno Vasco	San Sebastián	SPA Category A	1600	3yo +
August	Critérium Internacional de San Sebastián	San Sebastián	SPA Category A	1500	2yo
September	Gran Premio San Sebastián	San Sebastián	SPA Category A	2800	3yo +
September	Gran Premio Subasta ACPSIE (Conditions Race)	Madrid	SPA Category A	1400	2yo
September	Gran Premio Ricardo Ruiz Benítez de Lugo	Madrid	SPA Category A	2200	3yo+ f
October	Gran Premio de La Hispanidad	Madrid	SPA Category A	1600	3yo+
October	Gran Critérium	Madrid	SPA Category A	1600	2yo
October	Gran Premio Memorial Duque de Toledo	Madrid	Listed	2400	3yo+
Oct/Nov	Gran Premio Román Martín	Madrid	SPA Category A	1600	3yo+ f
November	Gran Premio Aniversario Reapertura de La Zarzuela	Madrid	SPA Category A	2000	3yo+
November	Gran Premio Antonio Blasco	Madrid	SPA Category A	1400	3yo+
November	Gran Premio Villamejor (St Leger)	Madrid	SPA Category A	2800	3yo
December	Gran Critérium Ciudad de Dos Hermanas	Dos Hermanas	SPA Category A	1600	2yo
