= Prague-Velká Chuchle Racecourse =

Horse racetrack

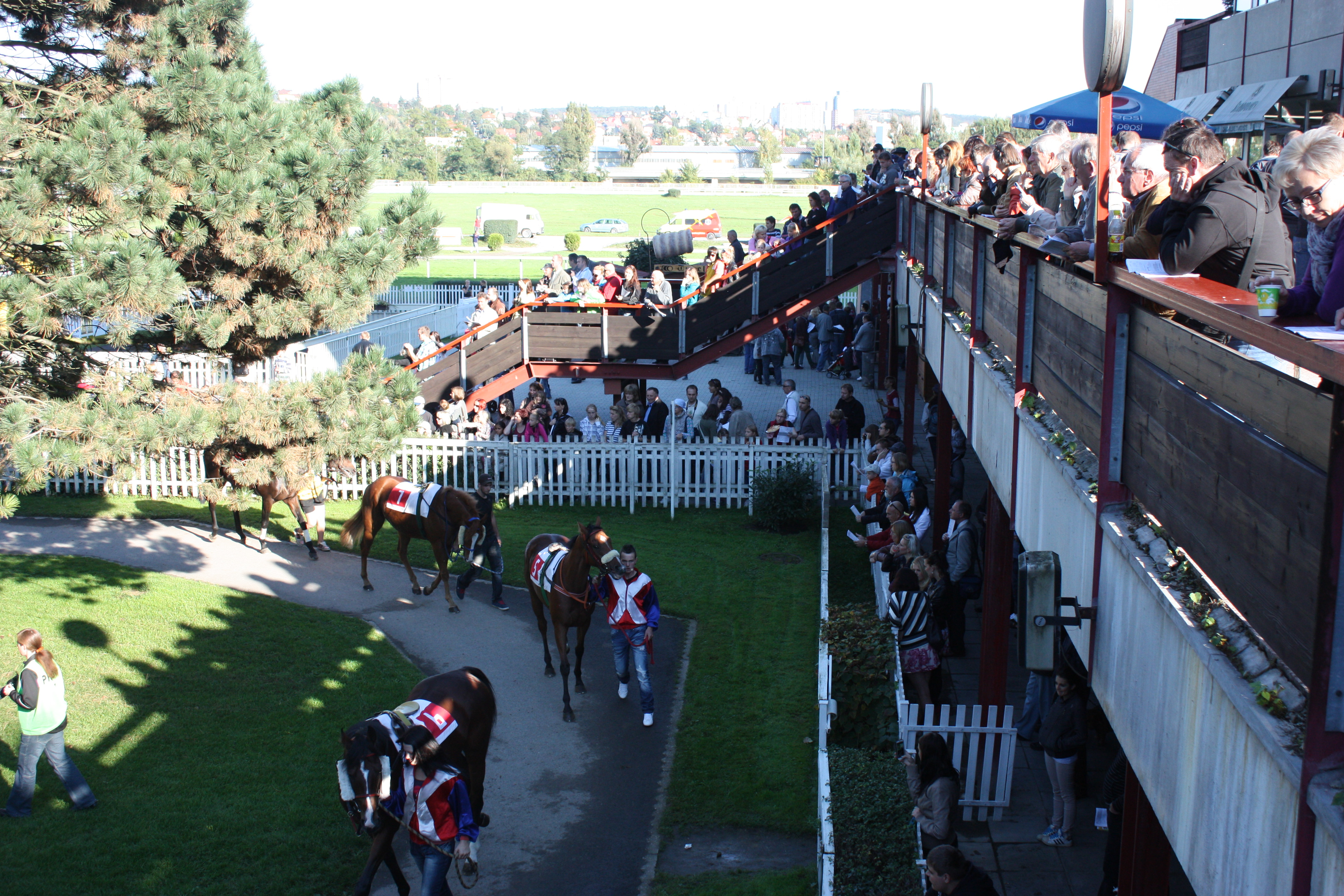
- The winner's paddock at Velká Chuchle
- Interactive map of Prague-Velká Chuchle Racecourse
- Location: Radotínská 69, 159 00, Prague 5
- Coordinates: 50°0′33″N 14°23′22″E
- Owned by: TMM, s.r.o.
- Operated by: TMM, s.r.o.
- Date opened: 26 September 1906
- Race type: Canter racing, Harness racing
- Notable races: Czech Derby, Czech St Leger, Czech 2000 Guineas
- Attendance: 2,500–5,000 (average)

The Prague-Velká Chuchle Racecourse is a racetrack in Velká Chuchle district of Prague, Czech Republic It is a racetrack where canter and harness horse racing is held. Races are held there from April to mid-November. The track measures 2180m in length.

== General information ==
Coat of arms of the Velká Chuchle district, which include horseshoes

The Praha-Velká Chuchle racetrack is the center of premier horse racing in the Czech Republic. It hosts more races than any other Czech racecourse, and its hosted races include the three most prestigious flat races in the country; the Czech Derby, the Czech St Leger, and the Czech 2000 Guineas. These three races make up the Czech Triple Crown of flat racing, which only seven horses have accomplished in the history of the Czech Republic. The latest, as of 2009, to have done so is the Polish thoroughbred Age of Jape.

== History ==
=== 1906–1937 ===
The Böhmischer Rennverein, a Czech horse racing club, campaigned to set up a new horse racecourse in the Prague area. The club was very prestigious; its members included the Archduke Karl Franz Josef, the Governor Earl Karl Coudenhove, and the Lord Mayor of Prague, Karel Groš.

This track was located at the Prague Indalidovna, and racing began there from the 1860s. A track was shortly later set up at Císařská louka (lit. 'imperial meadow'). Kincsem, widely recognized as one of the most successful horses of all time, won three times at this racetrack. However, the 1890s brought flooding that destroyed the track. After the river was regulated to reduce risk of flooding, racing at Císarská louka ended when the area of the island it was located on decreased.

A racetrack at Karlovy Vary was opened in 1899, but it was decided by the Rennverein that this was not near enough to Prague, which was the desired centre of racing in the Czech Republic.

Funded by the Rennverein, the construction of a very modern racetrack began in 1899 on land rented at Velká Chuchle. On 28 September 1906, the track was unveiled. The very first horse to win at the track was the mare Vision, ridden by her owner, veterinarian Francis Bartosch, during the Opening Stakes.

The racetrack was made popular by the various famous jockeys of the time that participated there. These included the Velká Pardubická winners Slinn (1901), Buckenham (1899, 1900, 1904) and Ultirck Rosák (1902, 1903). The racetrack hosted important English racing personalities such as trainer John Reeves and jockey Walter Earl, the presence of which brought importance to Prague, given that the capital city was at that time Vienna.

Although the press raved of the opening day at Velká Chuchle, the track remained relatively unknown. Indeed, the only race of great importance held there between 1906 and 1914 was the annual Velká pražská steeplechase.

On 13 May 1911, racetrack engineer Jan Kašpar landed his airplane Blériot XI on the racetrack. This was the first ever long-hail flight between Pardubice and Prague. This was an event that helped put the racetrack on the map.

The First World War marked the first time that operations at the racecourse were abandoned, and remains the only time for this to happen. The track itself was so devastated that there was little indication that any post-war regeneration of racing would occur.

On 28 March 1919, a meeting of ex-Böhmischer Rennverein members and other racing enthusiasts were organized at the hotel Saský dvůr, in Prague. There, they founded the Czechoslovak Jockey Club, which adopted the control of the horse racing community of the newly established Czechoslovak Republic.

On 15 March 1920, the first races of the season were held during a 6-day Spring meeting. There, horses owned by the most influential and powerful people in the horse racing community, from the most successful stables, raced. The main race, a 1600m event with 20,000 crowns of prize money, was won by the four-year-old Kongo, ridden by Kerész and owned by Oskar Kunz, in a time of 1 minute and 42 seconds.

Following the success of the Spring meeting, the event was repeated in August and later again in Autumn. Eighty foreign horses were transferred to Czech stables, and many foreigners visited the racetrack, enticed by the strong exchange rates of their currencies against the crown.

Starting in 1927, various forms of modern technology were implemented at the racecourse. First, electric lighting was installed in the entire grandstand and the weighing room. Then, in 1930, the Australian starting machine, which had made its way into all American and Australian racetracks, made its debut at Velká Chuchle.

In this year, Jaroslav Houra won the jockey's championship and two years later, at 19, he won the Czechoslovak Derby, remaining to this day the youngest jockey to ever win this title.

In 1931, the Czechoslovak Derby was hosted on 17 May, and it had clearly become the most significant flat racing day of the year, drawing the spectatorship of even the president of the Czechoslovak Republic. In 1937, the Czechoslovak Jockey Club rented the entire grounds until 1948.

=== 1938–1979 ===
The 1939 season began with a 50% increase in funding, and new horses being imported form the west. An otherwise optimistic start to the season was interrupted by the Munich Accord, and The Czechoslovak Derby was renamed the Bohemian-Moravian Derby, and from 1940 onwards the Bohemian-Moravian Blue Band. The Nazi's was a reign of terror; Jews were banned from entering the racecourse and were prevented from owning stables. Germans also took leading positions at the jockey club and the Nazis systematically eliminated Czechs from positions of power.

However, racing at Velká Chuchle did continue. Several horses were very successful throughout the years of the war. These included Simonel, the third winner of the Bohemian-Moravian Blue Band, and Cyklon, who ran 86 times in Prague, Karlovy Vary, and Vienna throughout his career. Cyklon won a total of 1,076,500 crowns of prize money between the ages of 2 and 8.

In 1942, the chestnut stallion Lionel took the racetrack at Velká Chuchle by storm. He won 25 races out of 36 during his 5-year career. His career winnings totaled 1,393,600 crowns, 5 times more than his purchase price as a yearling.

From May 1945, firefights sprang up between the Prague Uprising and the retreating German soldiers at Velká Chuchle and other surrounding villages. On 7 May, German troops occupied Velká Chuchle, and some of the 200 horses kept there were transported to municipal stables. On 9 May, when Prague was finally celebrating its liberation, Germans troops shot at a munitions train at Velká Chuchle station, which caught fire and set the surrounding area and the wooden stables alight. Three horses died, including the beloved Cyklon.

Private stables began to be nationalized in 1949 and soon after private horse auctions were suspended. The Ministry of Agriculture set up an organization tasked with distributing yearlings to several state-owned stables.

In 1950, in the aftermath of the Second World War, Czechoslovak stables fell under federal control, and private bookmakers vanished. Furthermore, racing was subsidized federally. With these changes, the Czechoslovak Jockey Club was disbanded, as the Ministry of Agriculture established the Czechoslovak Racing Institution to take up the Club’s former responsibilities organizing horse racing. After merely three years of existence, the Racing Institution was replaced by Státní závodište, a different racing organization. This organization would regulate flat racing in the Czechoslovak Republic for the next thirty-seven years. These changes did little to affect Velká Chuchle, as top horses were still being produced, ridden and trained by top professionals.

The 1950s say two excellent horses dominate Velká Chuchle; Symbol and Masis, both Derby winners. Aside from horses, Velká Chuchle profited from individuals, namely trainers Jaroslav Houra, Josef Celler, Karel Truhlář, and František Huleš. The elite jockey Karel Havelka dominated the races, and his foreign rivals had to prepare to compete with his riding style.

In 1955, Masis won the Czechoslovak Derby at Velká Chuchle, setting a new record time.

Albeit the first live telecast from Velká Chuchle being on 3 June 1962, Velká Chuchle was losing its position as the site of premier flat racing in Central Europe. There may have been several reasons for this. First, leading professionals began to leave Velká Chuchle, new jockeys and trainers did not have any international experience, the racing facilities had not been cared properly for, and were beginning to be in a bad state, and breeding and training methods were deteriorating in quality. Furthermore, other socialist countries, more populous than Czechoslovakia, such as the Soviet Union, had growing flat racing centers, pushing out Velká Chuchle. In 1965, things had begun to go better for Czechoslovak racing, with Myjavan from Motešice coming within one tenth of a second of Masis' record.

=== 1971–2003 ===
In 1972, an exceptional event transpired at Velká Chuchle. First the first time in its history, the Czechoslovak Derby was won by a woman. Indeed, the chestnut Crapom, ridden by Miloslava Hermansdorferová, won by a record distance of ten lengths. It may even have been possible fofr Hermansdorferová to be the first Derby winner in the world, but she broke her leg in 1969, and could only watch as her horse won the Derby with a different jockey. Unfortunately for Velká Chuchle's history, Ina Schwarzkächel won the Dutch Derby in 1970, robbing Hermansdorferová of this honor.

The 1970s were a decade filled with significant events for Velka Chuchle. First, on 8 April 1973, starting boxes were used for the first time at Velká Chucle. Then, in 1975, the renowned writer Dick Francis visited the racetrack. The 1975 Derby was significant because it was won for the fifth time by Josef Šach, who was already 55 years old.

In 1978, a series of successes of the trainer František Vítek and the jockey Vlastimil Smolík began. Smolík won the flat riders' championship 13 years in a row, which brought the time during which he rode to be dubbed the Age of Smolík. while Vítek's horses won for fourteen years in a row, with the exception of in 1986.

On 26 May 1976, the stallion Masis was put to sleep, and, one year later, La Legion gave birth to his foal at Napajedla. The foal was named Latina, and she was ridden by Smolík, becoming his sixth Derby winning horse.

The 1985 Czechoslovak Derby was the last race to be spectated from the old stands. Shortly after the Derby, the old stands were torn down, and construction of the current grandstand began.

The Velvet Revolution of 1989 brought with it new socioeconomic conditions to be adapted to by the racetrack. The state of racing had always been an indicator of the nation's progress. For example, the racetrack, which had never lacked for funding under the communist regime, now saw itself at a lack of money. Thus, the financials behind the improvement of the racecourse became problematic. It was therefore difficult to predict future developments as the funding was not always available.

While the new grandstand was being built at Velká Chuchle, racing transferred to West Bohemian racecourse at Karlovy Vary. At the beginning of the 1991 season, racing returned to Velká Chuchle, and, in the same year, Vlastimil Smolík won the Czechoslovak Derby for the sixth time, riding Lykeion, setting a new record.

In May of the 1991 season, the financial situation turned dire: the racecourse was in debt and stopped functioning. The organization of horse racing at Velká Chuchle turned over to the Association of Professional Trainers, Riders and Grooms, who, thankfully, secured funding from the Fund to Rescue Horse Racing. The Union of Czechoslovak Flat Racing organized the second half of the 1991 season. Plans to privatize some operations at the racecourse were elaborated, but the Ministry of Agriculture made an inspection of the racecourse, and after finding it in a desolate state questioned who would seek to privatize such a racecourse.

Velká Chuchle's well kept records allowed it access to European racing organizations and authorities without any problems. The victory of the French-bred Ajanta at the first classic race in the new Czech Republic demonstrated that the purchases of quality horses from Western European auctions would play a significant role in racing at Velká Chuchle in the next years.

By 1995, the organizer of racing at Velká Chucle had become insolvent, and the management of Czech flat racing took the decision to transfer racing from Velká Chuchle to racecourses elsewhere in the Czech Republic. The Czech Derby was hosted at Karlovy Vary, and its winner, Regulus, the last Czech-bred horse to win the Derby, won by a record 15 lengths.

In Autumn of 1995, racing returned to Velká Chuchle. The troubles plaguing the racecourse since the fall of the Berlin Wall had been solved one by one.

In 1996, Skanska adopted control of racing at Velká Chuchle, providing a guarantee of stability.

Famous South African jockey Michael Roberts visited the track for the 1997 Czech Derby, and rode two winners.

In November 2001, the Jockey Club of the Czech Republic, the highest racing authority in the country, with support from various investors, bought the facilities at the Velka Chuchle racecourse. A daughter company, TMM (Turf Management and Marketing), was established, and has been organizing racing at the Prague-Velká Chuchle Racecourse since.

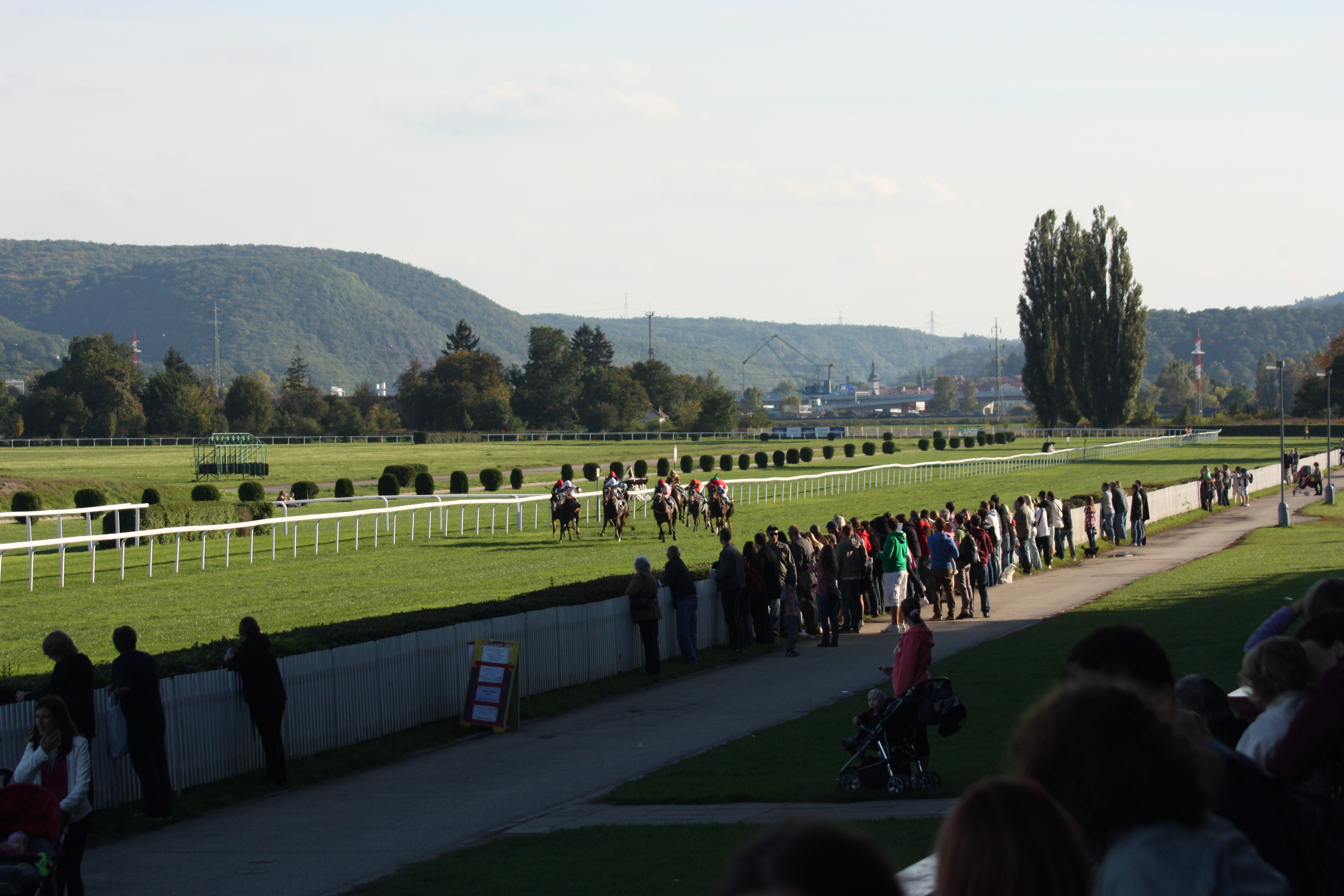
A recent flat race at Velká Chuchle

==== 2002 Floods ====
In the week starting 12 August, extensive flooding of the Vltava and Berounka rivers wreaked havoc at the racecourse. Having survived smaller floods, two world wars, and stables fires, the racecourse was accustomed to, and prepared for, such natural and manmade disasters. However, the flooding of 2002 outdid all previous disasters in the damage that it caused to the racecourse. Fortunately, all horses kept at the racecourse were able to be safely transported to several other racecourses. When the water level fell, the exact extent of the damages to the racecourse appeared for the first time, and unfortunately exceeded even the most pessimistic expectations. For the 2002 race season to proceed, all scheduled races had to have been moved to other racecourses in the Czech Republic. The main racing authority in the country, the Czech Jockey Club, had to be relocated from its offices in the grandstand of the racecourse to other offices.

In Spring of 2003, the racecourse was reopened.

=== 2013 Floods ===
In June 2013, the racecourse was again completely submerged in muddy water from predominantly the Berounka, which runs into the Vltava near the racecourse. Again, all horses were safely transported off the premises before the track was flooded. The flood was not as destructive as the 2002 one was, but the track was nonetheless rendered useless for several months. Reconstructions began, and the first race, a trotters race, was held on 28 July. The Czech St Leger, an important flat race, was delayed by merely one week, impressive considering the extent of the damages. Furthermore, the Czech Derby, the most significant Czech flat race of the year, was hastily relocated to the Most racecourse.

== General Information & Statistics ==
The racecourse has a capacity for 4000 seated, 10000 standing and 800 VIPs. There is complete internal television circuit, including production studio, BOSE surround sound systems in VIP lounges, lighting and projection equipment for the racetrack, Direct Internet connection - 8 x 2Mb, with wifi projection equipment, and IPTV (internet television) channel on television for the subscribed 10 000 people.

== Other Events Held at the Racecourse ==
The track has been used for events other than horse racing. Events held at the racecourse include country music festivals, rock music festivals, children's days, and carnivals. Furthermore, the facilities are available to companies to host their corporate events, include teambuilding and training.

During the winter months, when no horse racing is being held, the racecourse is transformed into a ski park for cross-country skiing, called Ski Park Velká Chuchle.

== Transport ==
The grandstand of the racecourse is located 2 minutes by foot from Praha-Velká Chuchle train station. The station is located 5 minutes by train from Praha Smichov station. Buses are available for transport to and from the racecourse.

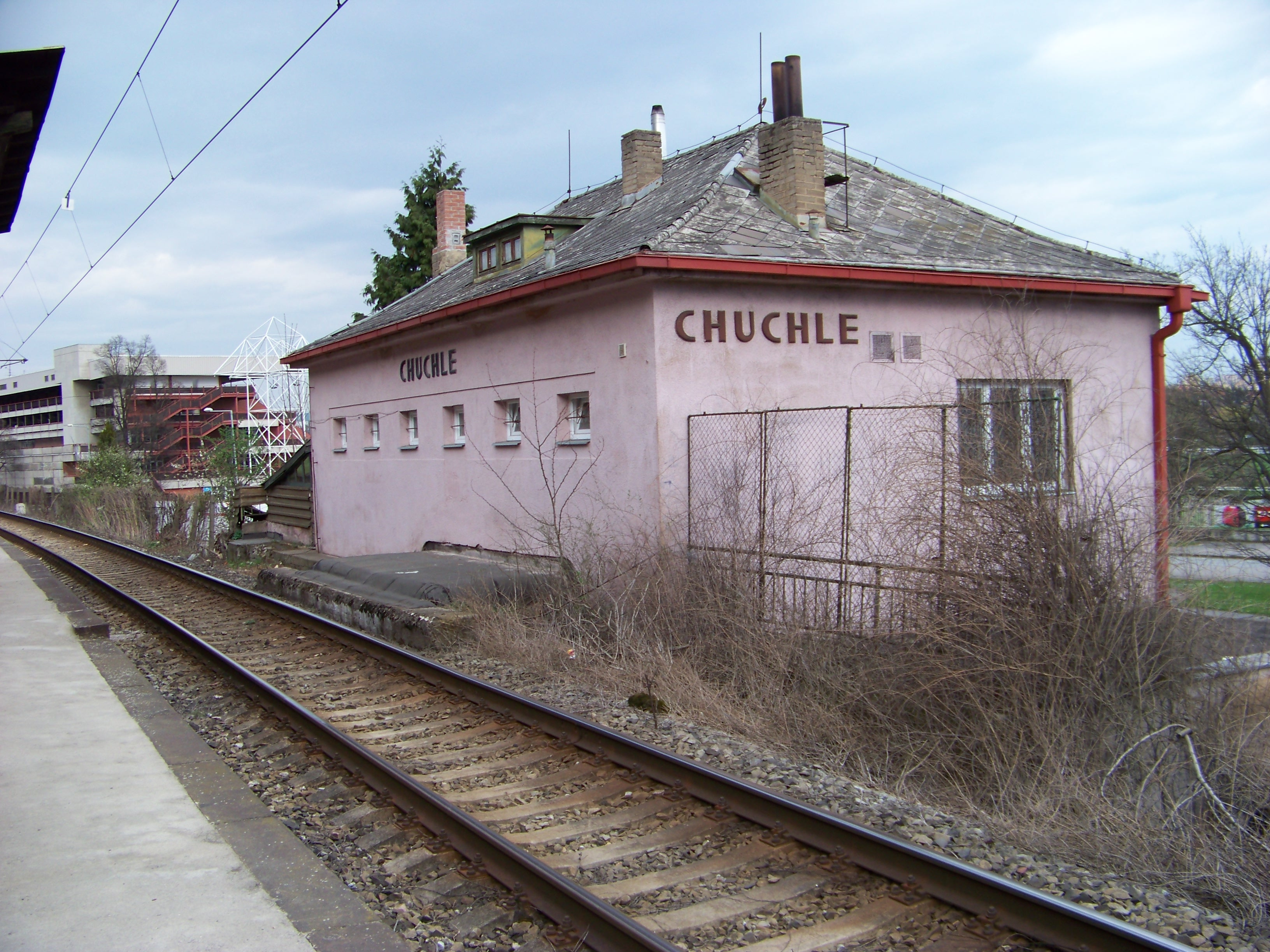
Praha-Velká Chuchle Station, with the racecourse visible in the background, showing the closeness of the two

== Season Schedule ==
All race days are on Sunday, from April to October. From April-September, they start at 14h00. In October, to account for an earlier sunset, the race day begins at 13h00.

April

- First Sunday - Gomba Handicap
- Second Sunday - Velká dubnová cena (April Stakes)
- Third Sunday - The British Racing Day
- Fourth Sunday - Jaroslav Mašek Memorial

May

- First Sunday - Jarní cena klisen (Czech 1000 Guineas)
- Second Sunday - Velka jarní cena (Czech 2000 Guineas)
- Third Sunday - Velká květnová cena (May Stakes)
- Fourth Sunday - Jarní handicap (Spring Handicap)

June

- First Sunday - Velká červnová cena (June Stakes)
- Second Sunday - Červnovy pohár (June Cup)
- Third Sunday - no raceday
- Fourth Sunday - Czech Derby

August

- Last Sunday - Czech St Leger

September

- First Sunday - Zářijová cena (September Stakes)
- Second Sunday - Zlatý pohár (Gold Cup)
- Third Sunday - Autumn Racing Festival
- Fourth Sunday - Svatováclavská cena (St. Wenceslas Stakes)
- Last Sunday - Dr. Gersch Memorial

October

- First Sunday - Harry Petrlik Memorial
- Second Sunday - no raceday
- Third Sunday - Cena zimního favorita (Winter Favourite Stakes)
- Fourth Sunday - Cena prezidenta republiky (President of the Czech Republic Stakes)
