= Kincsem Park =

Horse racing venue in Hungary

Coordinates: 47°29′54.88″N 19°7′24.48″E

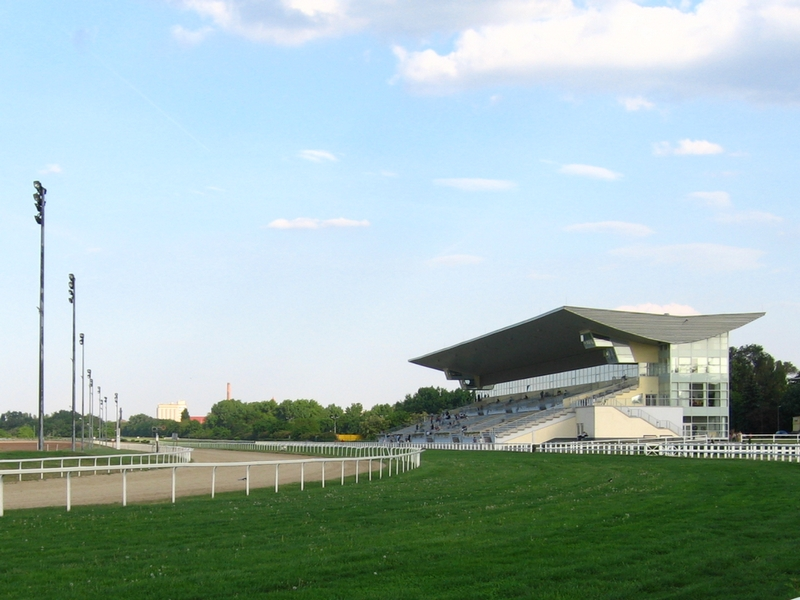

Kincsem Park is a major horse racing venue in Budapest, Hungary. The 84-hectare park, named after the racehorse Kincsem, can accommodate thoroughbred racing and harness racing, and can also be configured as a concert venue. Although the track experienced a drop in attendance in recent years, it has enjoyed new popularity among racing fans due to the success of Hungarian racehorse Overdose. In August 2009, Madonna performed in front of a sold-out crowd of 41,000 fans as a part of her Sticky & Sweet Tour.

== Gallery ==
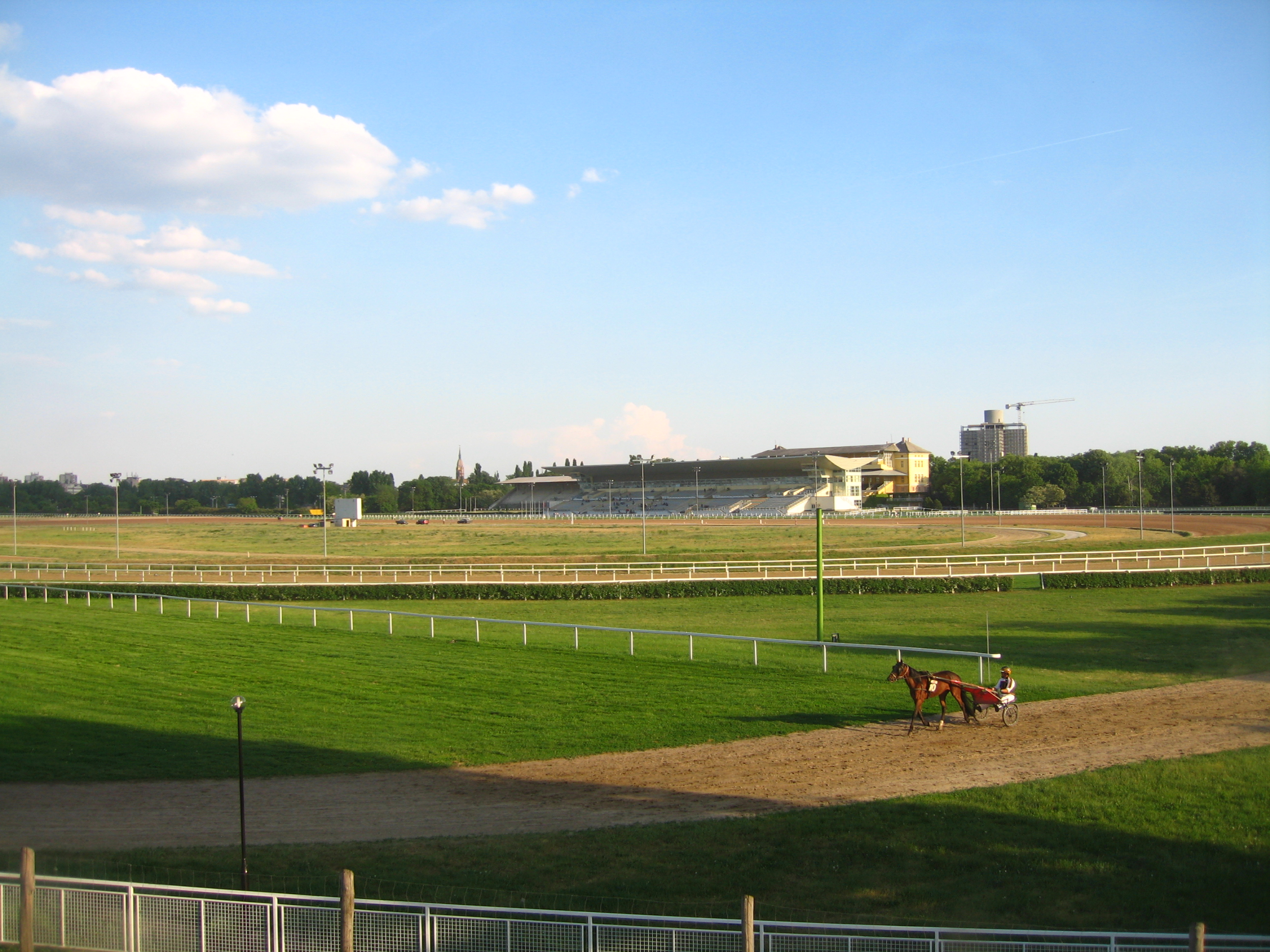
Kincsem Park

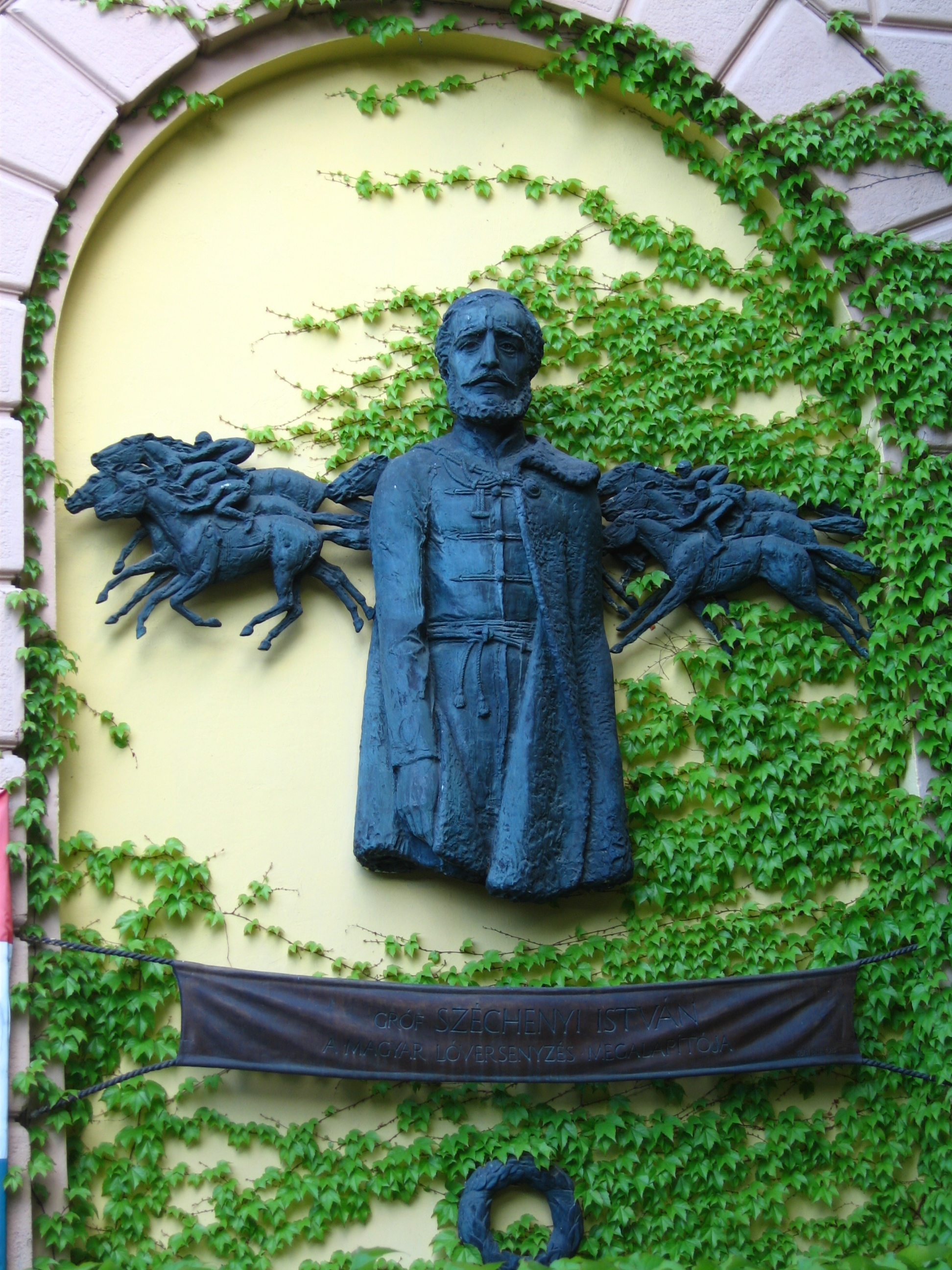
Count István Széchenyi the founder of Hungarian horse racing

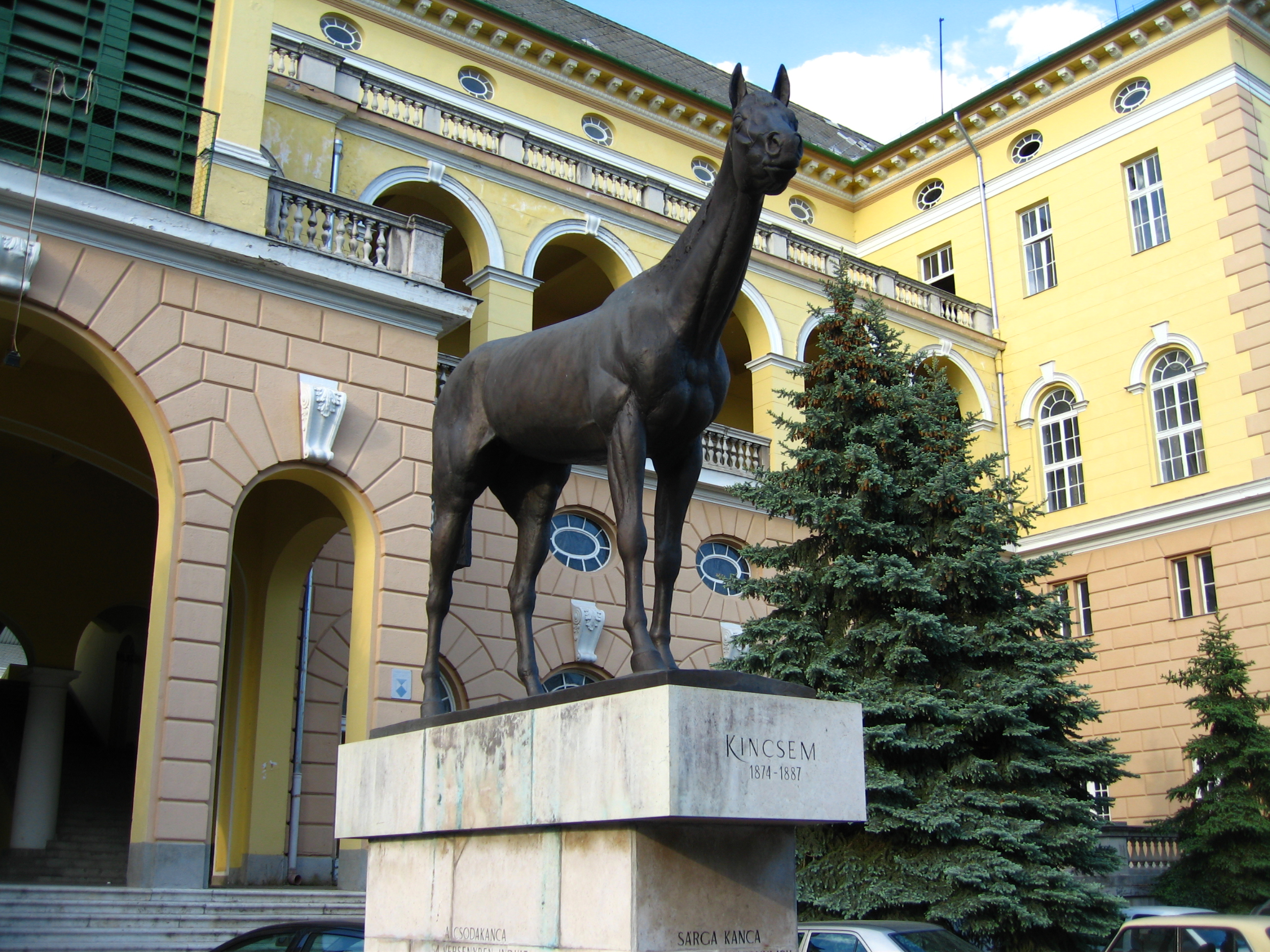
Statue of Kincsem

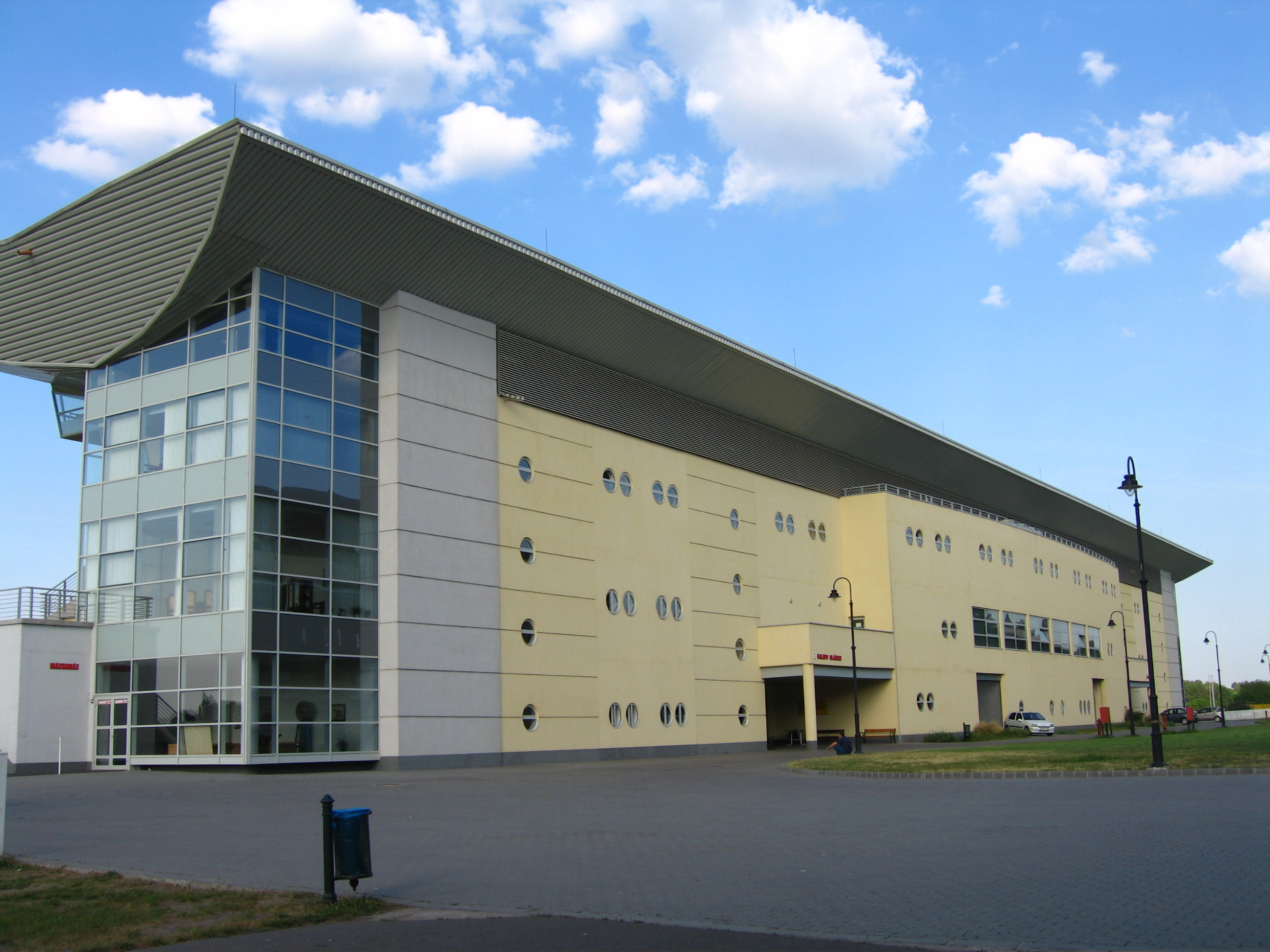
Kincsem Park new building

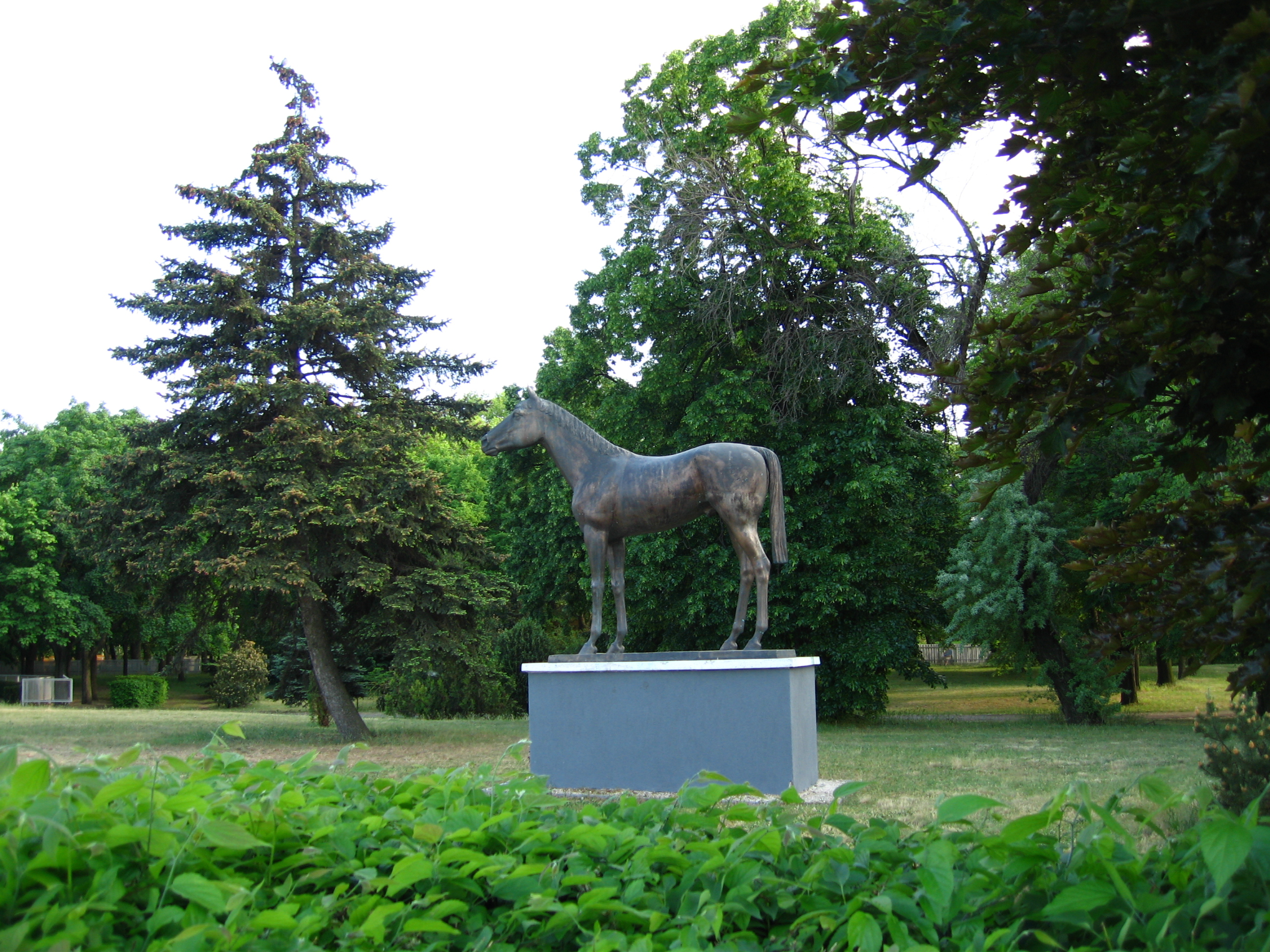
Statue of Imperial

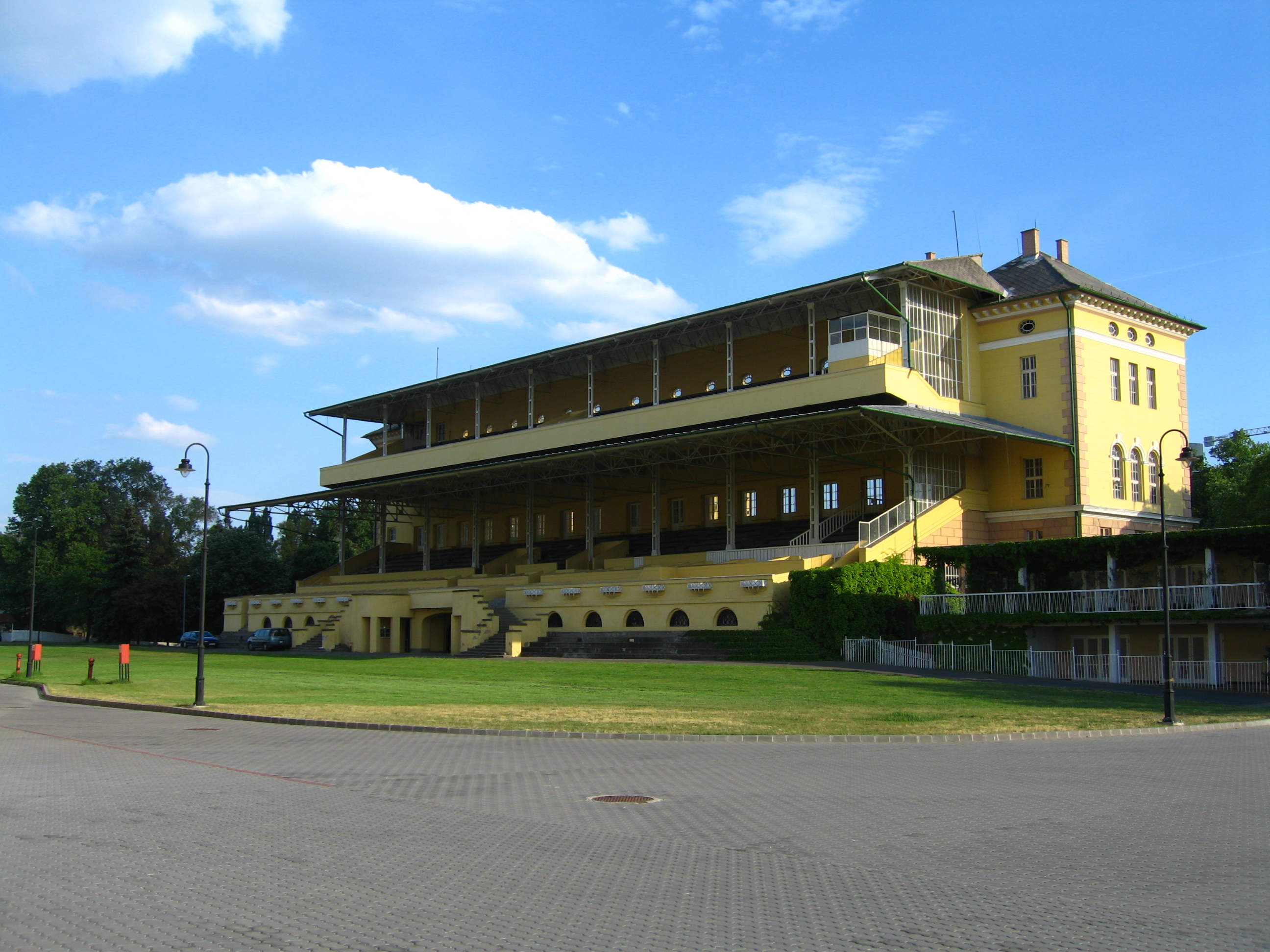
Kincsem Park old building

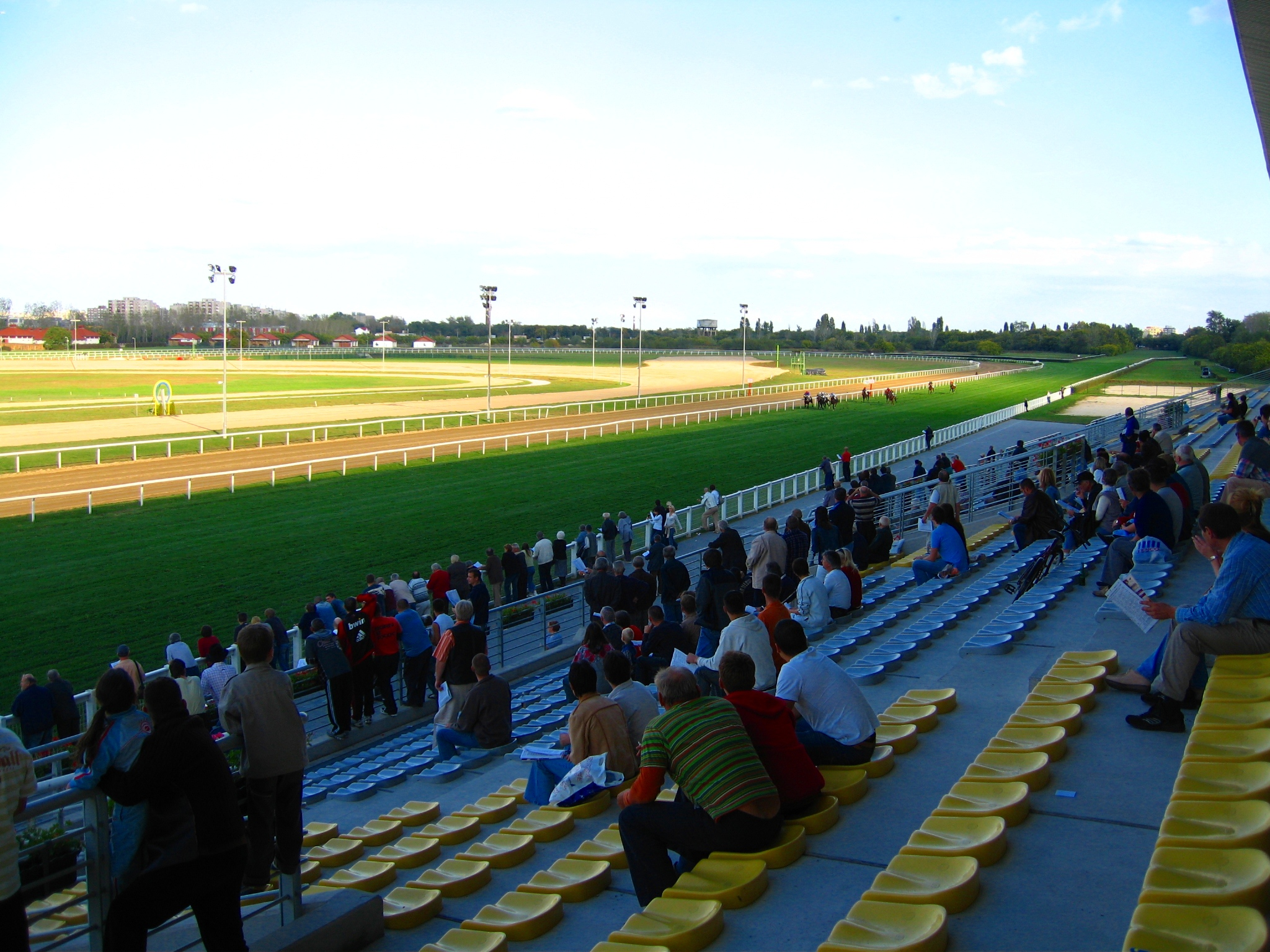

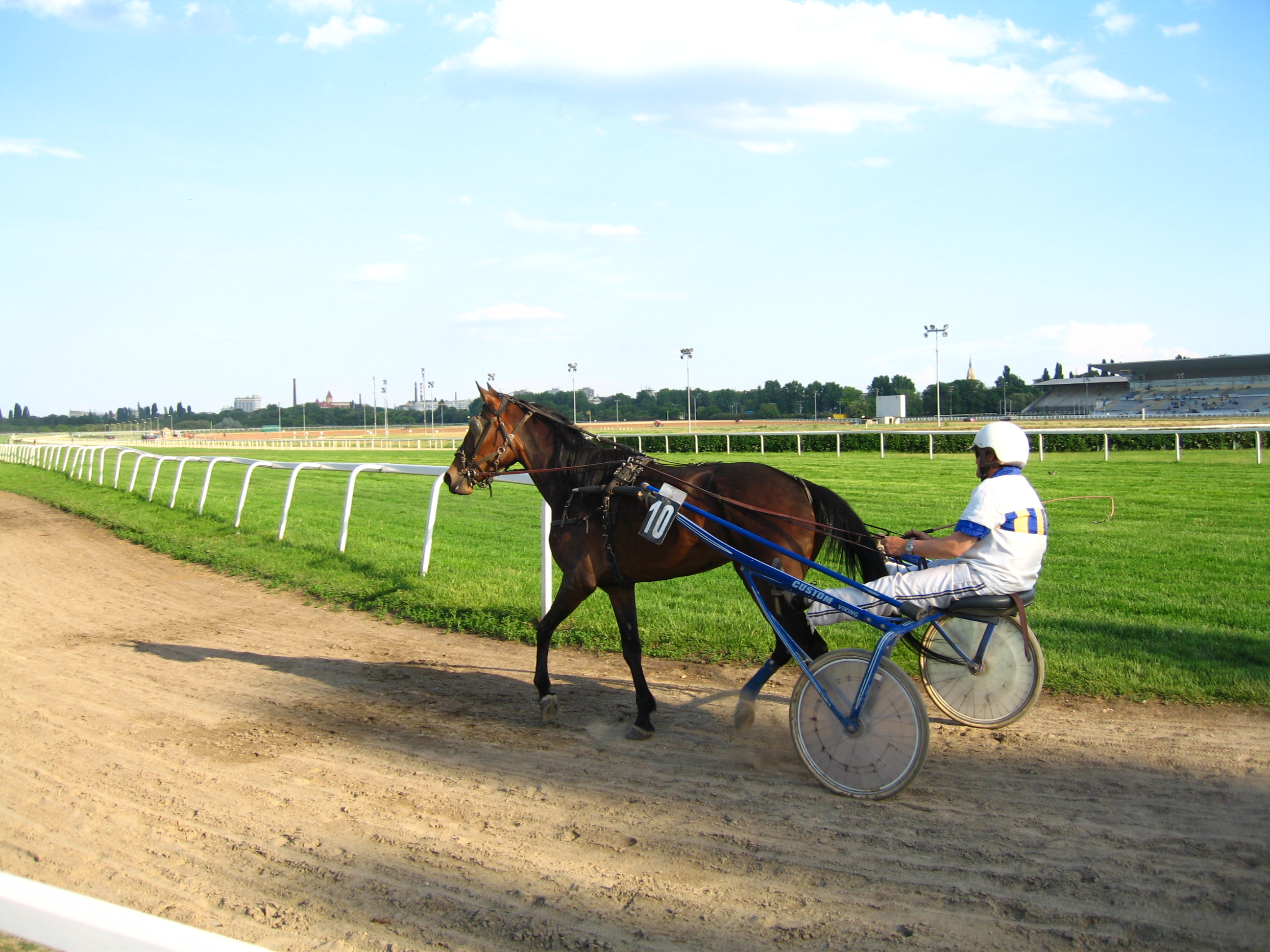

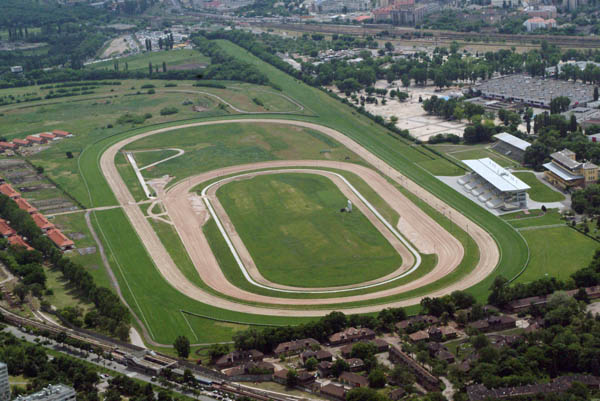

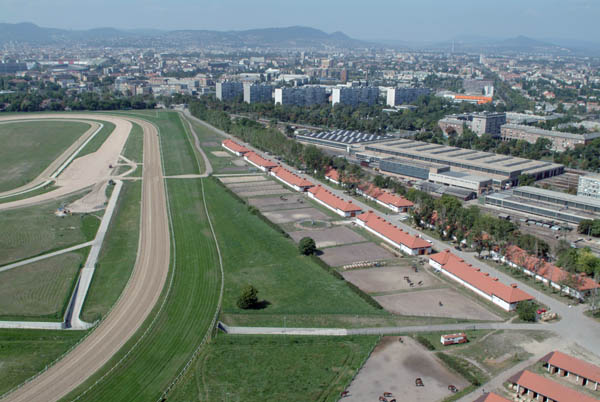

== Notable races ==
Thoroughbred races

- Káposztásmegyeri Prix
- Hazafi Prix
- Batthyány Prix
- Hunyady Prix
- Nemzeti Prix
- Millenniumi Prix
- Alagi Prix
- Magyar Kanca Prix
- Magyar Derby
- Kozma Ferenc Memorial Race
- Szent István Prix
- Kincsem Prix
- Imperiál Prix
- Gróf Károlyi Gyula Memorial Race
- Gróf Széchenyi István Memorial Race
- Magyar St. Leger
- Szent László Prix
- Budapesti Prix
- Kállai Pál Memorial Race
- Kétévesek Kritériuma
- Lovaregyleti Prix

Harness races

- Tavaszi Handicap
- Bródy János Memorial Race
- Pulay Kornél Memorial Race
- Májusi Grand Prix
- Ferge László Memorial Race
- Nemzeti Prix
- Négyévesek Grand Prix
- Lovasélet Sprinter Cup
- Kanca Prix
- Szalay János Memorial Race
- Dr. Vecseklőy József Memorial Race
- Derby Kísérleti Race
- F.V.M. Prix
- Magyar Ügetőderby
- Pannónia Prix
- Szent István Prix
- Marschall József Memorial Race
- Hungária Prix
- Őszi Kanca Prix
- Kétévesek Grand Prix
- Köztársásági Prix
- Őszi Kísérleti Race
- Ménesek Prix
- Baka Handicap
