= Kincsem =

Hungarian Thoroughbred racehorse

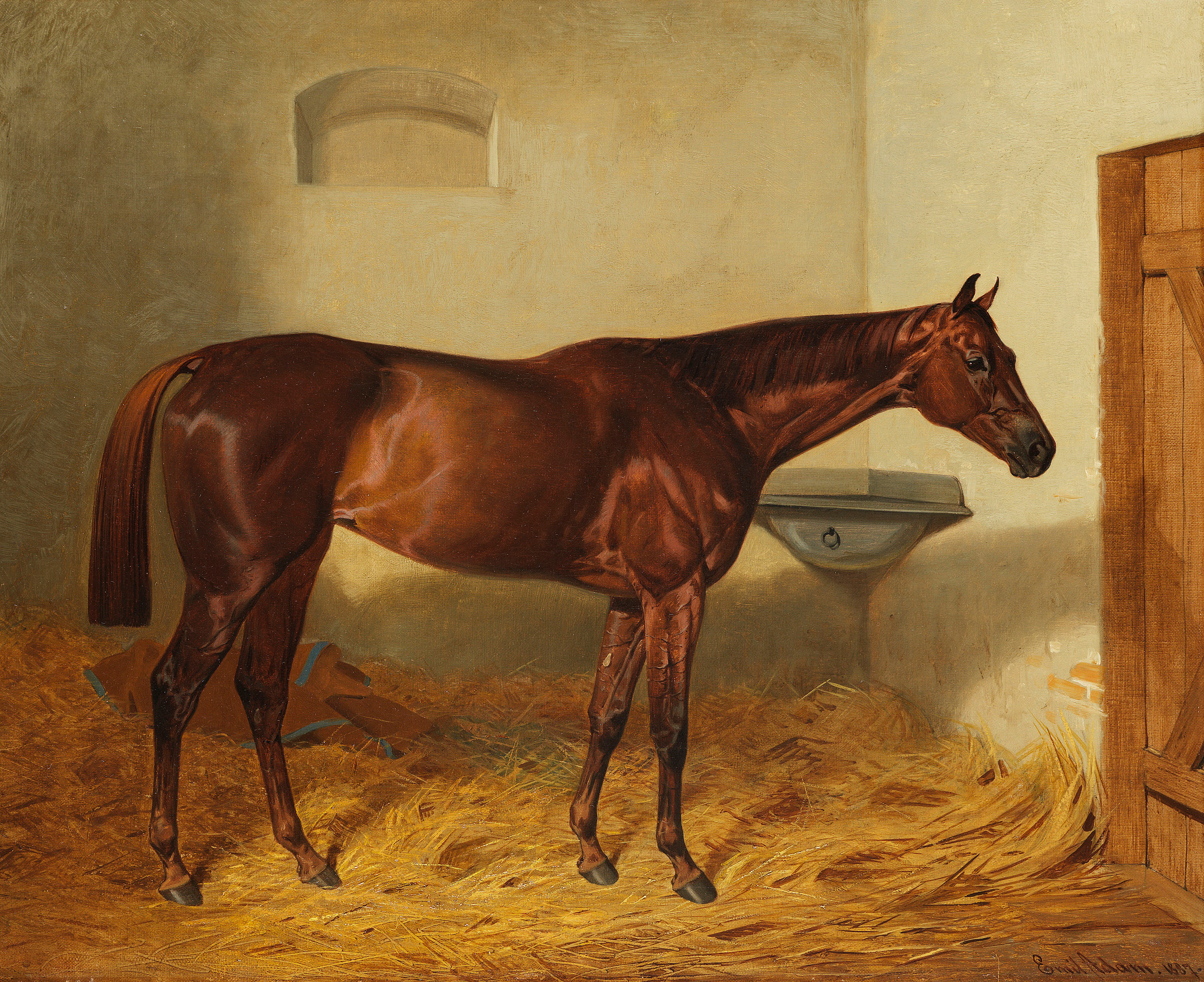
- Kincsem painted by Emil Adam in 1887, from a print.
- Sire: Cambuscan (GB)
- Grandsire: Newminster
- Dam: Water Nymph
- Damsire: Cotswold (GB)
- Sex: Filly
- Foaled: March 17, 1874
- Died: March 16, 1887
- Country: Hungary (As Austria-Hungary)
- Colour: Liver chestnut
- Breeder: Ernő Blaskovich
- Owner: Ernő Blaskovich
- Trainer: Robert Hesp
- Record: 54: 54–0–0
- Earnings: ƒ199,754.50 = €2.56 millions in 2020

Major wins
- Hungarian Two Thousand Guineas (1877); Hungarian One Thousand Guineas (1877); Hungarian Autumn Oaks (1877, 1878, 1879); Hungarian St. Leger (1877); Austrian Derby (1877); Austrian Kaiserpreis (1877); Grosser Preis von Hanover (1877); Grosser Preis von Baden (1877, 1878, 1879); Staatspreis Erster Classe (1878); Goodwood Cup (1878); Grand Prix de Deauville (1878)

Honours
- Kincsem Park in Budapest, Hungary; Kincsem Museum, Budapest, Hungary; Kincsem Horse Park, Tápiószentmárton, Hungary; Kincsem Hotel, Kisbér, Hungary; Kincsem Farm, Archer, Florida; Life-sized statue at Kincsem Park, Budapest

Kincsem (Hungarian pronunciation: [ˈkint͡ʃɛm]; Hungarian for "My Precious" or "My Treasure"; March 17, 1874 – March 16, 1887) was a Hungarian Thoroughbred racehorse who has the longest undefeated record of any racehorse after winning all of her 54 races. The next closest in this regard is Black Caviar, who won all her 25 races. Foaled in Kisbér, Hungary in 1874, Kincsem is a national icon and widely considered one of the top racehorses of the 19th century.

Over four seasons, Kincsem won against female and male competitors at various race tracks across Europe, including multiple Classic race victories in the Austro-Hungarian Empire. She raced frequently in Germany, winning the Grosser Preis von Baden three times. In her four-year-old campaign, she traveled to England to win the Goodwood Cup, then won the Grand Prix de Deauville in France. In total, Kincsem defeated 85 different horses who had won over 400 races. She defeated 17 classic winners, including four consecutive Deutsches Derby winners (Double Zero, Pirat, Oroszvár, Künstlerin), three consecutive Prei der Diana winners (Chére Amie, Altona, Illona), a Poule d'Essai winner (Fontainebleau), Prix de Diane winner (Mondaine), etc...

As a broodmare, Kincsem produced just five foals, four of whom survived. Nevertheless, two of her foals became Classic winners and her daughters also proved to be outstanding broodmares. Her line has had a lasting influence on the breed, with modern descendants including English Classic winners Polygamy and Camelot.

== Background ==
Kincsem was bred at the stud of Ernő Blaskovich at Tápiószentmárton, in The Hungarian part of the Austro-Hungarian Empire. Her sire, Cambuscan, was bred by Queen Victoria and in 1864 went on to win the July Stakes and place in the St. Leger Stakes. He was sold to Hungarian interests and was brought to stand at the Hungarian National Stud in the Kisbér District in 1873. Cambuscan was by Newminster, while his dam, The Arrow, was by Slane. Kincsem was out of the Hungarian mare Waternymph, a daughter of the English horse Cotswold. Kincsem's third dam, Seaweed was also by Slane, making Kincsem inbred to him in the third and fourth generations (3x4).

At that time, there were thieves in Hungary called betyars who stole cattle and horses. One night they tried to steal horses from an open summer stable of Blaskovich that had only a crossbar through the door. They made a noise, so stable staff chased them away and the horses, including Waternymph, were saved. This legend was later distorted and attributed to Kincsem, who in the new version was allegedly stolen by wandering Gypsies and later returned to her owner.

Another distorted legend says that Kincsem was once offered for sale as part of a package deal with six other yearlings for 7000 gulden but she were rejected by the buyer, Baron Alex Orczy. In fact, according to a newspaper article about the auction, Kincsem was not on the list. Blaskovich later wrote that he didn't want to sell her because she had an unusually long, easy galloping stride and he loved her very much for her calm and very affectionate nature. In November 1875, Blaskovich sent her to Göd, seventy kilometers away, where trainer Robert Hesp opened a new stable that year. Kincsem arrived there “on the hoof” and the journey took two days. Englishman Robert Hesp trained her throughout her career and she was ridden by other Englishmen Elijah Madden (42 wins), Archie Wainwright (9 wins) and Tom Busby (3 wins).

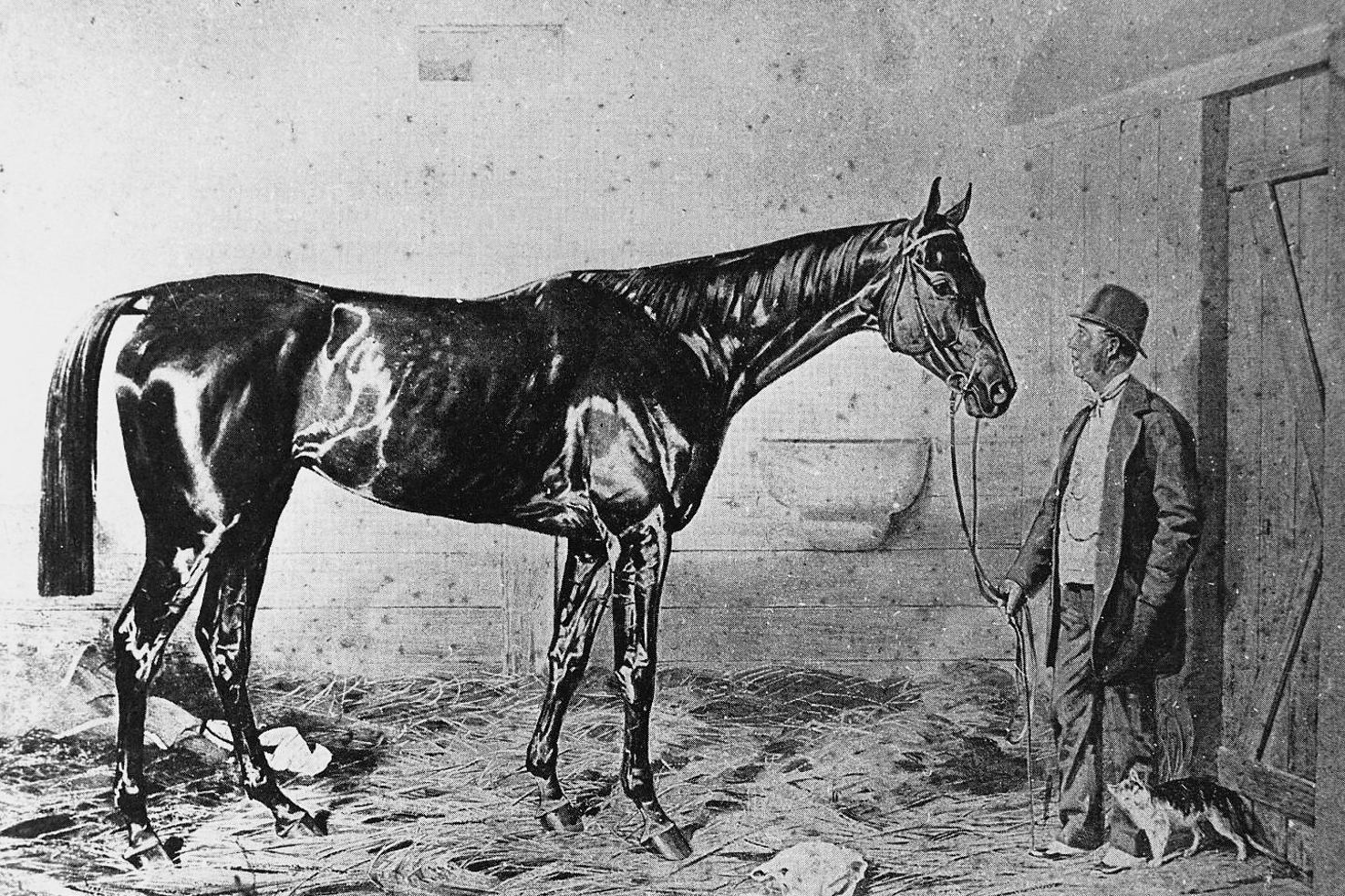
Kincsem with cat and either her trainer Robert Hesp or groom Frankie Kincsem

Kincsem was a liver chestnut without any white markings who stood 16.1 hands (65 inches, 165 cm) high at maturity. Several descriptions were written during her life. The first was written even before her first race, in the spring of 1876, when the editors of the racing newspaper Sportblatt visited the leading stables and described Kincsem as the best two-year-old in Austria-Hungary. Sportblatt from 8 April 1876: "The chestnut mare by Cambuscan from the Waternymph looks most like a racehorse. She is over and over full of quality, long and deep, stands on dry, strong, flawless legs and shows herself to great advantage in a fast gallop. We think we are not mistaken in expressing the view that [she] is destined to play an excellent role on the racetrack." During her stay in England, newspapers described her movement as admirable - long, flat, spacious, and it was said that there was no horse with a better stride at Newmarket. A few weeks later in France, a journalist under the pseudonym Freemann wrote in the newspaper Le Jockey: "It is rare to see a more complete type of racehorse than Kincsem, when she appeared on the track with her tall figure, magnificent lines, excellence, strength, lightness, with a figure as perfect as a gallop, and we understood why Captain Matchell, one of the greatest connoisseurs in the world, offered £10,000 to her owner, who refused it." Another journalist, Robert Milton, wrote in Le Figaro: "Mr. Blaskovich's mare is the most beautiful I have ever seen in my life. All the breeders admire her and her victory was met with great applause." Nevertheless, American novelist Brainerd Kellogg Beckwith (not a contemporary of Kincsem) wrote his own description in his 1967 book "Step and Go Together": "She was as long as a boat and as lean as a hungry leopard ... she had a U-neck and mule ears ... she was lazy, gangly, shiftless ... she was a daisy-eating, scenery-loving, sleepy-eyed and slightly pot-bellied hussy."...

Kincsem was noted for her quirky personality, though some details may have become exaggerated over time. For example, a legend claims that she always traveled with a cat and might not move if separated from it. A painting shows her with a cat that some sources name Csalogány (nightingale). Contemporary sources make no mention of the cat but many articles of Sportblatt refer to her traveling with a horse named Csalogany. During Kincsem's extensive travels, all her hay and grain came from Blaskovich's stud farm (then an unusual arrangement), and she refused to eat anything else. She was also particular about the quality of the water she drank. On one occasion at Baden-Baden, the water ran out and she refused to drink for two days until a suitable substitute was found at what was subsequently known as Kincsem's Well.

== Racing career ==
=== 1876: Two-year-old season ===
Another legend, used in the Hungarian movie Kincsem, speculates that Kincsem started her career in Germany because Blaskovich was ashamed of her, but the real reason was a summer break on Austrian and Hungarian racetracks. During the three-month break, Austrian and Hungarian stables traveled to German racetracks with their best horses, particularly the two-year-olds who did not have races in Austria-Hungary until September. Trainer Robert Hesp traveled to the Berlin with some of his horses and the first to start was Csalogany, who won easily at odds of 3–2. Kincsem made her debut three days later on 21 June and beat three German horses by 4 lengths as the 1/3 odds-on favourite.

The next stop was Hannover, where on 1 July Csalogany won the Zukunfts-Rennen by 1 length in front of the Austro-Hungarian colt Hamburg. On the next day, Kincsem won the Vergleichspreis also by 1 length with Hamburg in second. Third was a three-year-old, Double Zero, who would later win the Deutsches Derby. On 3 July, Csalogany added another victory and the expedition continued to Hamburg. On 9 July, Kincsem won the Hamburger Criterium by 1 1/2 lengths ahead of the German filly Adelaide and colt Hamburg. Csalogany ran two races in three days in Hamburg, winning the Vergleichs-Rennen ahead of the filly Little Luder. She was subsequently beaten by the great four-year-old colt Basnas in Pokal and got a break.

Kincsem added three more victories in Germany, beating the Austro-Hungarian colt Blücher by 1 1/2 lengths at the Royal Meeting in Bad Doberan and German filly Regimentstochter by 10 lengths in a match race in the Louisa Rennen in Frankfurt. Her sixth victory came on 31 August in the Zukunfts-Rennen (Zukunftspreis that time) in Baden Baden, where she beat her stablemate Criterium by 2 lengths.

The stable then returned to Hungary for the fall campaign. On 2 October, Kincsem showed her best two-year-old form when beating Little Luder in the Polgárok dija in Sopron by a huge margin. The Hungarian horseracing newspaper Vadász- és Versenylap reported that she won by 15 to 20 lengths. A description of Kincsem was published after the race in Sportblatt: "Despite the fact that this two-year-old filly measures 16 hands (64 inches, 163 cm), all her limbs are built perfectly proportionally and impress with their regularity and colossal strength, in which the durability peculiar to the filly ad oculos is demonstrated."

In her next start on 15 October, she met stablemate Csalogany in the Kétévesek versenye in Budapest. Elijah Madden, who had ridden both fillies before, chose to ride Kincsem. The field of ten was the biggest ever faced by Kincsem. Vadász- és Versenylap reported that Kincsem and Csalogany left the rest the field behind and fought from halfway head to head, with Kincsem holding off Csalogany by half a length. Little Luder was third. This race is associated with the legend that Kincsem had bad starts. The source of the legend was jockey Robert Smart, who told a story 34 years later that the horses were standing at the starting line but Kincsem stood behind them and grazing. According to Smart, the starter ignored her, let down the flag and she lost 40 meters. Smart probably mistook either the horse or the race involved, because the original race reports never described the bad starts of Kincsem, and the report from this particular race says: "An excellent start, after which the field goes in a bunch...".

On 22 October, Kincsem stepped up in distance from sprints and won the Kladruber Preis at 1600m in Vienna, beating colts Der Landgraf and Hamburg by 5 lengths. She finished her two-year-old campaign on 29 October by winning the Kladruber Criterium at 1400m in Prague, cantering home 1 1/2 lengths in front of Criterium.

Kincsem finished the year with ten victories from ten starts. She and Csalogany were the best two-year-old fillies of Austria-Hungary by earnings. The form of Csalogany subsequently fell and she subsequently won only one race, while traveling with Kincsem as a stable friend and lead horse for training. She was with Kincsem in Newmarket and in Goodwood when she prepared for the Goodwood Cup in 1878, and her Newmarket workouts with Kincsem were reported in Vadász- és Versenylap.

=== 1877: three-year-old season ===
Over the winter, Kincsem was made the even-money favourite for the Nemzeti Dij (Hungarian 2000 Guineas) ahead of Csalogany, and was the 2/1 favourite for the Austrian Derby. She was not entered in the Deutsches Derby, in which the 6/1 favourite was Blücher, who had finished second behind her in the Erinnerungsrennen in Doberan.

Both the "world wonder fillies" of trainer Hesp opened the season on 27 April in Bratislava. In the Trial Stakes (Austro-Hungarian 2000 Guineas), Kincsem set the pace and beat Blücher "hands down" by one length in field of eight horses. However, Csalogany shockingly disappointed that day when she finished third behind Pfeil in the Staatspreis (State Prize) at odds of 2/10. Csalogany lost again two days later and both fillies went to Budapest.

A week later, Kincsem won two races in three days. The Nemzeti Dij and Hazafi Dij were recognized as the Hungarian equivalent of 2000 Guineas and 1000 Guineas respectively, but were restricted races at that time to Hungarian-bred horses. In the Nemzeti dij on 6 May, Camillo set the pace, followed by Kincsem and Csalogany. At the halfway point, Kincsem moved to the front, and continued to draw away. She won as she willed ahead of Camillo and Csalogany. The final margin was not disclosed in any available sources from 1877 but the final time has been published - 1:47 for 1600 metres. In the Hazafi dij on 8 May, Kincsem had a fair start but waited behind opponents in a bunched field of six. Halfway through the race, she moved to the front with Bimbo, and then pulled ahead to win easily by 1 1/2 lengths in a time of 1:45 with Csalogany unplaced.

After the meeting in Pest, Kincsem along with 11 of Hesp's other horses went to the Derby meeting in Vienna. In the Preis des Jockey-Club (Austrian Derby) on 21 May, her main rival would be Tallós, a colt that had finished second in the Criterion Stakes at Newmarket. He was owned by Alexander Baltazzi, who had won the previous year's Epsom Derby with Kisber. At the start, Tallós lost several lengths but soon moved close to Kincsem, who waited in third place behind Premier Coup and Pfeil. Before the last turn, Blücher moved to the lead but Kincsem responded. In the 700-meter long straight, Kincsem set a strong pace to the last 200 meters, then cantered home. Her jockey Madden reportedly had the reins in one hand and was patting her with the other. Tallós was second by two lengths, three lengths ahead of Pfeil and Blücher in a field of eight runners, according to the Viennese newspaper Sportblatt. The Budapest racing bulletin Vadász és Versenylap reported that she won by 10 lengths and that was the biggest discrepancy in her race reports.

Three days later on 24 May, Kincsem dropped back in distance to a mile in the Trial Stakes. She was not herself and Madden had to use the spurs to beat stablemate Vsecko-jedno by 2 lengths. (Note: there were multiple races called Trial Stakes at the time. This particular race was for horses aged three and up, not a classic race. The Austrian equivalent of the 2000 Guineas was the May Trial Stakes in Pressburg, moved to Vienna in 1879. Others Trial Stakes disappear or were renamed.) Just three days later, Kincsem returned to form in the Kaiserpreis over two miles. While carrying 50 kg, she set the pace and won by 10 lengths ahead of her older stablemate Hirnok (69 kg). She ended the spring season with 6 victories in 30 days.

From Vienna, the Austro-Hungarian stables traveled on their usual summer journey through German racecourses. In Berlin, Blaskovich's two-year-old Bolygo won the Erstes Criterium, the same race as Kincsem won the previous year. The stable then moved to Hannover, where horses trained by Hesp won four races. Kincsem was entered in the featured race, the Grosser Preis von Hannover, run on 24 June over a distance of 3000 meters. She beat the great Austro-Hungarian mare Konotoppa by 6 lengths with Derby winner Double Zero third in a field of five runners.

Next stop was Hamburg. Kincsem was not entered in the Deutsches Derby (supplementary entries were not allowed at that time), but in the Renard Rennen on 9 July, she beat the Derby winner Pirat by four lengths with Konotoppa far behind. To the credit of Pirat, he ran against the fresh Kincsem the day after a hard battle with Tallos in Derby.

Kincsem was given a rest then returned on 3 September for her first start in the Grosser Preis von Baden over a distance of 3200 metres (roughly 2 miles). The field of three contained no German horses that year, but instead featured another duel between Kincsem and Konotoppa. After a few changes in the lead, Kincsem won unchallenged by three lengths ahead of Konotoppa. Third and last was French horse Mambrin in the colours of Hungarian owner Tassilo Festetics. Five days later, Kincsem demonstrated her class again in the Wäldchens-Preis in Frankfurt. Although heavily eased, she beat Pfeil by 10 lengths, with the sole German runner Schnellläufer 25 lengths behind. Pfeil won 10 races that year and was beaten only twice, finishing third to Kincsem and Tallos in the Austrian Derby and second to Kincsem in Wäldchens-Preis.

Back in Austria-Hungary, Kincsem ran seven races on four racetracks in 25 days. In 19th century racing, prize money was for the two places only with big difference between the winner and runner-up. Walkovers were common because there was no reason to run for second place against big stars. Kincsem earned six victories by walkover and also won a couple of races cantering against her stablemates, who did not challenge her, just running to take the second-place money. She picked up easy money in the Alamidij (City Prize) in Oedenburg (Sopron) on 29 September where she beat her sole opponent, stablemate Prince Gregoire, by three lengths. The next day, she entered a race of the same name and the result was stated as a "compromise", meaning Kincsem cantering for the agreed victory over her stablemate Blankenese.

In Pest, Kincsem entered the St Leger on 7 October over a distance of 2800 meters. In a field of seven, the early pacemaker opened up a lead of 30 lengths, while Kincsem rated at the head of the trailing pack. In the last turn, she went to the lead and won by 10 lengths ahead of Prince Giles The First. Two days later, Kincsem entered the Kanczadij, now known as the Hungarian Oaks but at that time a race for fillies and mares age three and up. Kincsem was assigned a weight of 60.5 kilograms (133 lb). She again followed a long-margin leader in second place and won easily, beating her old rival Konotoppa by three lengths.

On 14 October, Kincsem returned to Vienna, where she won the Freudenauer Preis by walkover. She then travelled to Prague for the Kaiserpreis on 21 October at a distance of 2400 metres. She met Prince Giles The First for the second time and beat him by a length, leading all the way. Two day later, she won another Kaiserpreis by walkover. She ended the season with 17 victories, having won at distances from 1600 metres to 3200 metres.

After the 1877 season, British racing journalist Mr. Langley from the Morning Post delivered a challenge in the name of Mr. John Fiennes, who owned the Epsom Oaks winner Placida. As Placida was better at distances from 6 furlongs (1.2 km) to a mile, Fiennes suggested a match over 3/4 miles in the spring of 1878 at either Ascot or Goodwood. Blaskovich accepted the challenge but altered the conditions, suggesting a match for a purse of 50,000 - 500,000 florins (roughly equivalent to €600,000 to €6 million in 2020), at a distance from 2400m to 2800m, held halfway between the two home bases, in either Frankfurt or Baden-Baden. The match was widely discussed in the newspapers in the winter but Fiennes refused the conditions, explaining that he did not want to travel outside England with Placida.

=== 1878: four-year-old season ===
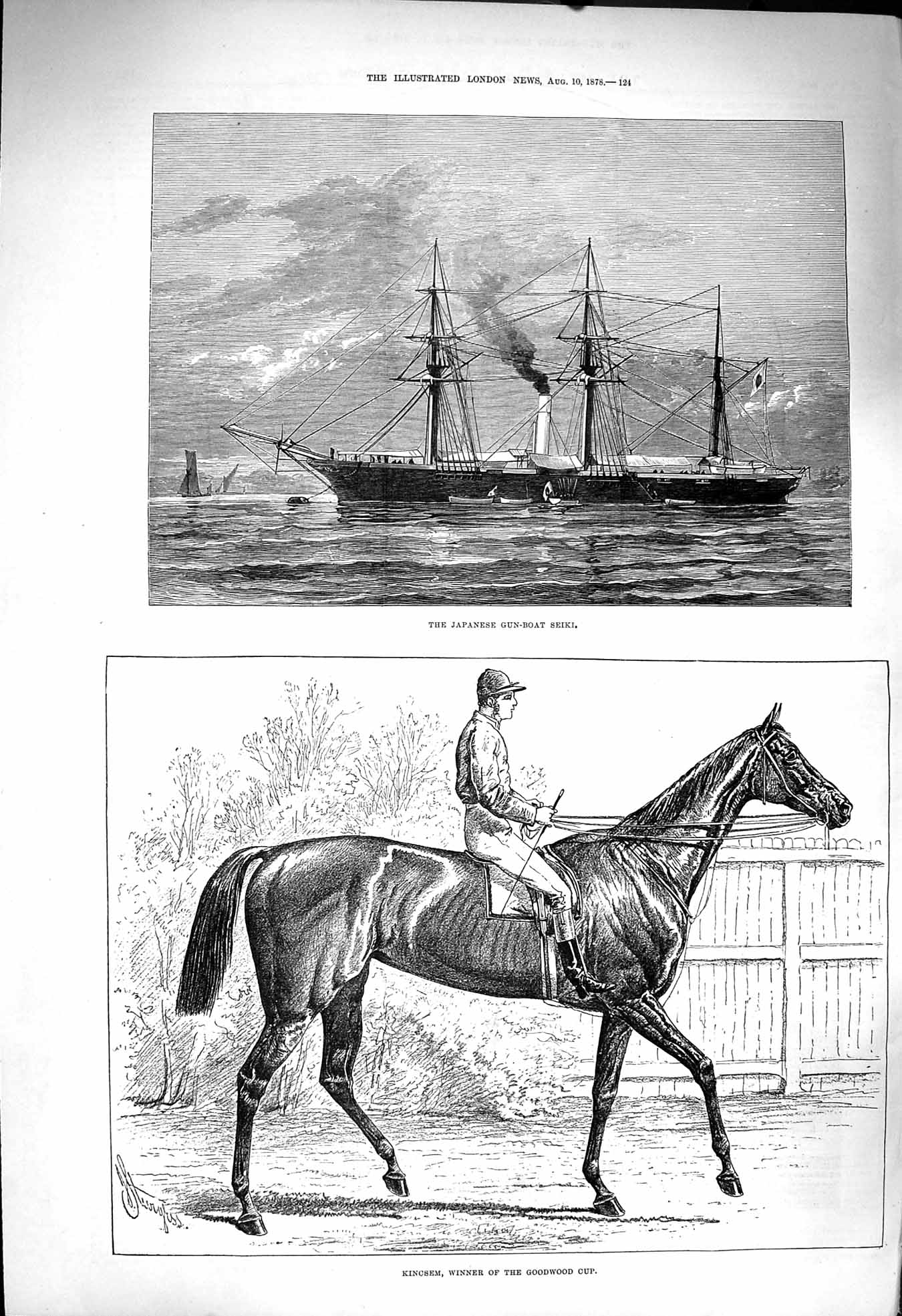
Kincsem's victory in the Goodwood Cup was covered by the Illustrated London News

In the spring, the form of previously undistinguished three-year-old horses can improve dramatically, which posed problems for Kincsem in her first two starts of the season, in the two cheapest races she ran that year. In the Eröffnungsrennen on Easter Monday 22 April, Kincsem looked to have little competition in a field of five runners on paper form. However, the three-year-old Wild Rover stayed on strongly under 53.5 kg and Madden had to ride hard until Kincsem, under 65.5 kg, broke his resistance 50 meters before the finish and won by two lengths. Wild Rover had been unplaced at two but developed into one of the best three-year-old horses of 1878 with five victories and four second-place finishes.

Another up-and-coming three-year-old colt met Kincsem three days later in the Praterpreis over 2000 meters, where she set the early pace under 67.5 kg. Count Henckel's Oroszvar under 54.5 kg challenged her in the straight and come close, but Madden pushed Kincsem home three lengths ahead of the colt, who later won the Trial Stakes (A-H 2000 Guineas), Union Rennen, Deutsches Derby and Renard Rennen.

On the way back from Vienna, Kincsem made a stop in Bratislava, where she met Count Henckel's Prince Giles The First for the third time. In a match race in the Államdij over 2400 meters, Kincsem set a moderate pace, easily repulsed a short attack of Prince Giles The First, and won by 5 lengths while giving him a 5 kg advantage.

On 14 May, Kincsem met Prince Giles The First again in Budapest, in the Allamdij over two miles. The three-year-old filly Gondolat set the pace under 46 kg and led by 30-40 lengths ahead of Kincsem (67 kg), followed by Prince Giles (62.5 kg). At the halfway point, Kincsem made her move and easily went by Gondolat. Turning into the stretch, she led by five lengths and cantered home 5 to 6 lengths ahead of Prince Giles The First. Two days later, Kincsem beat Prince Giles The First for the fifth time. In a match race in the Kisbéri dij over 2000 metres, Kincsem set a slow pace under 69.5 kg, then increased the pace after half a mile. Prince Giles the First under 65 kg could barely hold her and Kincsem won "as she willed" by two lengths.

In the Allamdij over 2400 metres on 19 May, Count Henckel sent former champion mare Konotoppa against Kincsem in a field that also included the best three-year-old filly Altona, who like Kincsem was trained by Hesp. Kincsem (69.4 kg) took the early lead setting a slow pace, then Altona (51 kg) took over as the pace picked up. In the last turn, Kincsem struck and beat her stablemate by a couple of lengths. A further 4 to 5 lengths behind was Konotoppa (66.5 kg), who was reported in foal and went to Henckel's stud Hugo Telep in Oroszvar (Rusovce) after the race.

In the Austrian Derby on 26 May, Kincsem's half-brother Outrigger (Ostreger x Waternymph) was defeated by a head. That same day, Kincsem won the Staatspreis over 2800 meters, beating the nearest of three rivals easily by a length. On 28 May, she repeated last year's victory in the Trial Stakes over a mile, beating Prince Giles The First for the sixth time, in this case by 10 lengths while giving him a 6.5 kg advantage. On 30 May, she repeated her victory in the two mile Staatspreis, cantering home five lengths ahead of two rivals.

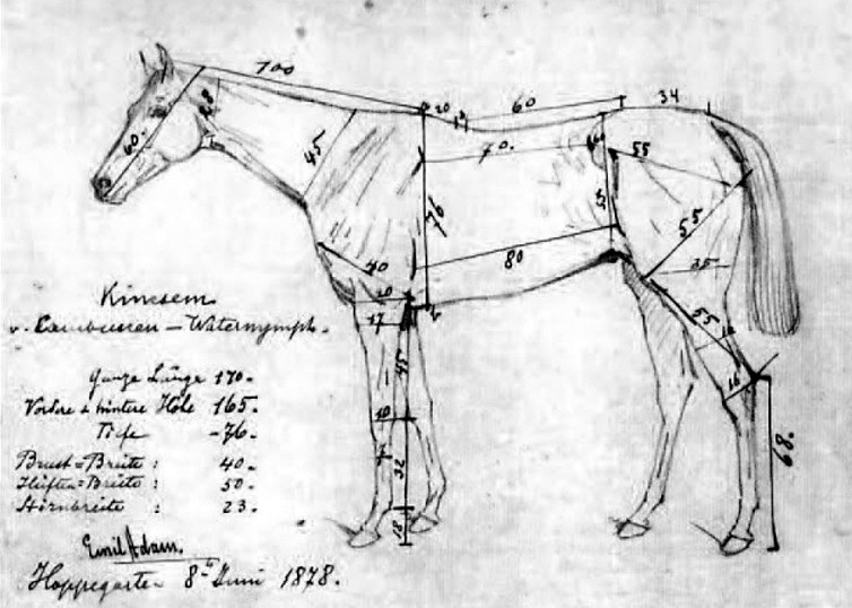
Kincsem's measurements by Emil Adam

That concluded the spring part of her campaign, in which Kincsem won nine races in a span of 39 days at distances from 1600 to 3200 meters at the three main Austro-Hungarian racetracks. Directly from Vienna, the Austro-Hungarian stables went to Berlin. Count Henckel won four races there, including the Union Rennen, in which Oroszvar beat the best German three-year-old Vitus, and Hesp's Altona won the Stutenrennen (Preis der Diana). Kincsem did not race in Germany as she was now targeting the Goodwood Cup in England. While in Berlin though, she was measured by the famous painter Emil Adam, who then created a rare drawing signed 8 June 1878 in Hoppegarten. Her basic measurements were described as body length 170 cm, total height 165 cm (of which the chest measured 76 cm), width of chest 40 cm and width of hips 50 cm.

Ten days later in Hannover, Altona was beaten by a head in the Grosser Preis von Hannover and Hesp's stable continued to the Derby meeting in Hamburg. At this point, Kincsem with her stable friend Csalogány sailed to England. The Hungarian racing bulletin Vadász- és Versenylap cited turfwriter "Vigilant" from the newspaper Sportsmann, who wrote: "Kincsem last Sunday (June 30) sailed across the channel to England, in very nice quiet weather and in the evening she was with Mr. Daley in Newmarket; and on Monday morning she took a morning walk with her stablemate."

After Altona won the Hansa-Rennen in Hamburg, jockey Elijah Madden went to Newmarket, where he rode Kincsem in workouts. One of the reports said that Kincsem and Csalogany were in good health and could be seen walking every day on the Newmarket lawn, and galloping every other day from two to 2 1/2 miles. However, the English papers were no longer as sympathetic towards Kincsem and there was some unfavourable talk. One report speculated that the air, food and water in England were having an adverse effect on Kincsem's form, and noted that Csalogany was no longer a good lead horse because she could not force Kincsem to the required speeds during their gallops. The subsequent explanation was that they didn't have good drinking water in Newmarket. Hesp solved the problem by boiling the water, then cooled it and gave it to Kincsem. This story is probably the basis of the legend that Kincsem drank only water from their home and traveled with her own water supply, which is rather unrealistic due to the enormous amount of the water that they would have to carry by train on several months' journeys.

In mid-July, the racing stables and studs around Newmarket were affected by an epidemic so Hesp was forced to leave the area. The Duke of Richmond, owner of the Goodwood House next to Goodwood racetrack, accommodated the Hungarian expedition for the last 14 days before the Goodwood Cup.

There were originally 17 horses entered in the Goodwood Cup, held on 1 August over 2 1/2 miles (4000 m). This had reduced to five by raceday, and then Ascot Gold Cup winner Verneuil and Lord Clive were withdrawn at noon. Kincsem went off at odds at 3/1, the sole race in her career where she was not an odds-on favorite. She won by two lengths over 5/4 favourite Pageant, winner of the Brighton and Chester Cups, and subsequently the Doncaster Cup. Lady Goligthly, winner of the Yorkshire Oaks, Nassau Stakes and Park Hill Stakes in the previous year, was far behind under Fred Archer at odds of 2/1. The Austrian and Hungarian newspapers enthusiastically reported about another easy victory of the "Wonder Mare", but English turfwriters were shocked by the ride of Madden, well known as hard whip rider in Austria-Hungary and Germany. The newspaper Press wrote: "The race was run at a slow pace, which was not increased much till three-quarters of a mile from home, when Lord Falmouth's mare was beaten, and it looked a thousand to one on Pageant, the Hungarian mare being beaten and being ridden hard – shamefully so, in fact, and Madden must surely have been apprenticed to a butcher. He has, I believe, ridden the mare in nearly all her races, and the only wonder to me is that there is anything of her left, as she was spur marked from shoulder to tail; however he kept at it, and, catching Pageant a hundred yards from home, won in a canter."

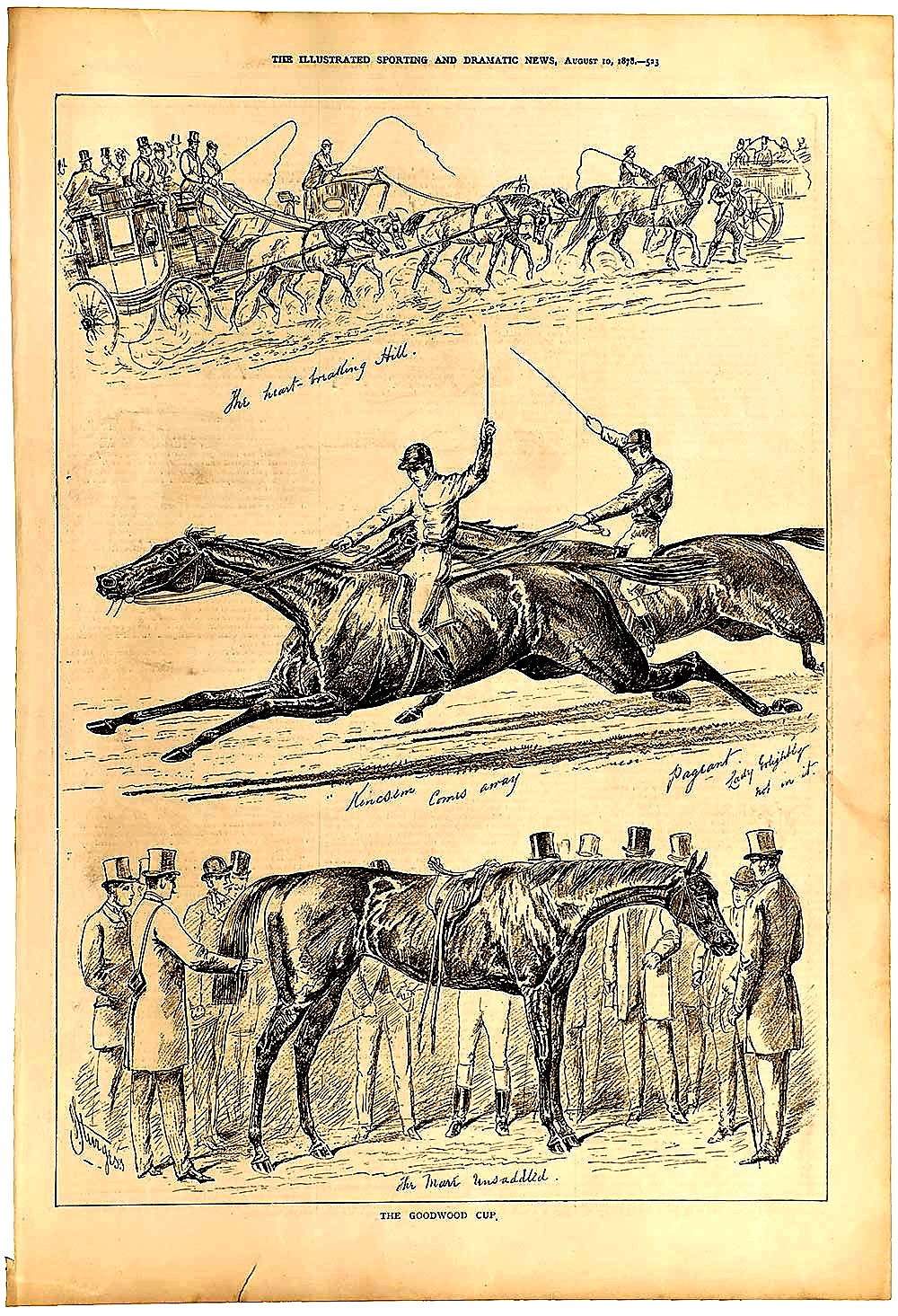
Goodwood Cup 1878 in The Illustrated Sporting & Dramatic News

The Illustrated Sporting & Dramatic News published a picture of the fight between Kincsem and Pageant alongside a picture of spectators viewing Kincsem's injuries after the race. Turfwriter "Skylark" wrote: "How she won is now a matter of history, but how she might have won with Cannon or Archer up it is most difficult to conjecture, Madden riding her in rather butcher-like fashion after she had the race well in hand." English reports later came to Austria-Hungary and the satirical magazine Kikeriki published a cartoon showing a donkey watching the torture of Kincsem with the caption, 'Oh how happy I am that I am not a talent!'

Francis Cavaliero reported that he was asked from several quarters whether the mare was for sale and with the consent of her owner asked for the sum of £20,000, whispering "she is not for sale".

The Goodwood meeting was a great one for Hungarian thoroughbred breeding. A day before the Goodwood Cup, a two-year-old own brother to Tallos named Galantha was a close third behind Rayon d'Or in the Levante Stakes, and on the day of the Goodwood Cup, a two-year-old colt (subsequently named Molecomb) by Cambuscan out of Honey Bee won the Molecomb Stakes under Fred Archer at odds 100/15. The winning prizes in the Goodwood Cup and Molecomb Stakes were £480 and £1,125, converted to 4,800 and 11,250 florins, but Austro-Hungarian and German owners and spectators won much more on bets. Vadász- és Versenylap reported that Tassilo Festetics, Béla Zichy and the Grand Duke of Hesse won 150,000 florins each, while Blaskovich won 30,000, Cavaliero 20,000 and Elijah Madden 10,000. Together they netted 510,000 florins which was equivalent to about €6.5 million in 2020.

The team of Kincsem had avoided the French railways on their way to England through Germany and did so as well on their way to Deauville. Kincsem almost certainly sailed from Portsmouth, which is about 15 miles (24 km) from her Goodwood stable, to Le Havre, about 10 miles (16 km) as the crow flies to Deauville. Vadász- és Versenylap published a short message that on 4 August Kincsem made her way to France and ended up in Havre to await her duty in Deauville. The same report said that a match against Epsom Derby and St. Leger winner Silvio, offered by Lord Falmouth in Goodwood, would not take place.

In the Grand Prix de Deauville over 2400 meters on 18 August, Kincsem's main rival was Fontainebleau, winner of the Poule d'Essai des Poulains. The pace was set by Ellevion, a stablemate of Fontainebleau, but Kincsem used him as her own pacemaker, following him at the front of the pack. On the backstretch, she went to the lead and only Fontainebleau could keep her pace. Kincsem held off his drive and won a half length having the advantage of 3 kg. Four lengths behind followed Gift (subsequent winner of the Grand Prix de Vichy), Mondaine (winner of the Prix de Diane and Grand Prix de Vichy) and Vinaigrette (previous winner of the Grand Prix de Deauville) in a strong field of 8 runners.

On the way from Deauville to Baden-Baden, Kincsem and Csalogany had to use the French railways, which at the time were badly designed with lines focused to Paris. Hesp later reported that Kincsem's form in Deauville was about 10 pounds (in terms of ratings) below her top form from Goodwood and fell even more during the protracted railway journey when Kincsem could not do her daily working routine.

There was persistent rain before the Baden-Baden meeting in 1878 and on 3 September, the day of the Grosser Preis von Baden over 3200 meters, the area was hit by heavy rain. Vadász- és Versenylap said that the racetrack looked like a country road in spring. Five runners went to the start, with Kincsem going off as the 1/8 favourite against her old rival Prince Giles The First at 8/1. He was at his top form, having just smashed heavy favourite Vitus in Doberan. Other starters were Altona at 25/1, the sole German runner Purple at 40/1, and Vsecko-Jedno with no bets because his owner declared he was only running to try a muddy track before starting in the next race. Vsecko-Jedno was pulled up shortly after the start and Purple set the pace, followed by Altona, Prince Giles and Kincsem. In front of the stands, Prince Giles and Kincsem moved to second and third place. On the opposite side of the track, the pace increased and Altona was beaten. Purple led into the straight where Prince Giles struck, followed by Kincsem three-quarters of a lengths behind. Jockeys Tom Busby and Elijah Madden were working hard, with Kincsem closing inch by inch on a muddy track while carrying an extra 7 kg. Both horses reached the finish together. Purple was 25 lengths behind and Altona was pulled up.

At the time, there were several options to determine the winner in case of dead heat – a deciding heat, the agreement of the owners, or a draw. Blaskovich and Henckel decided to run a second heat, in which many backers turned to Prince Giles The First, a powerfully built colt with a significant weight advantage. Nonetheless, bets were 7/4 in favour of Kincsem. They ran head to head through the first half of the race, and Kincsem looked to have gained the upper hand on the far side. However, a dog then jumped out of the bushes and tried to catch Kincsem. Both horses were scared and only started to calm on the turn, where Busby on Prince Giles The First took advantage of the situation and went to the lead on the inside. Kincsem, ridden hard by whip and spurs, fought back, closing more and more. She caught up with him with 200 meters to go and won "deadly tired" by five lengths.

Nineteenth century Thoroughbreds were tough but Kincsem was exhausted. Hesp canceled her program in Frankfurt and send her to the Vienesse racetrack Freudenau to rest before races in nearby Sopron. Kincsem's rivals went to Frankfurt. Altona was a close third in the Wäldchens-Preis, Purple was fourth in Frankfurter Handicap under top weight and Prince Giles The First won the Ehrenpreis. Then Altona was quickly shipped to Hungary, where she won five races in a short time span: on 13 September she won over 2400 meters in Debrecen, on 15 September over 3200 meters, on 20 September over 3212 meters in Cluj, on 22 September over 4824 meters, and on 28 September over 2400 meters in Sopron.

Kincsem returned to racing on 29 September in the Allamdij in Sopron, where she won by "compromise" with Lőrincz and on 20 October in Budapest, she won the Ritterdij by walkover. However, on 22 October in the Kanczadij over 2400 meters, she met her stablemate Altona. This time it was not a predetermined result and for the first time since her two-year-old campaign against Csalogany, her invincibility was threatened by a stablemate. The owner of Altona, János Sztáray, engaged top jockey Tom Busby, who had been beaten by Kincsem many times on Henckel's horses Prince Giles The First, Konotoppa, Blücher and Oroszvar. Kincsem with Madden (67.5 kg) set a strong pace challenged by the three-year-old Altona (58.5 kg). In the straight, they fought head to head until the 200 meter pole where Kincsem finally broke the resistance of Altona. She won by half a length and went for a well deserved winter break with 15 victories that year.

=== 1879: five-year-old season ===
After the 1878 season, Kincsem's stable friend Csalogany went to the stud and become a successful broodmare, producing 10 winners from 10 foals, including Hungarian and Austrian Oaks winner Csalfa. Madden, who had ridden Kincsem in all 42 of her victories to date and who had been champion jockey in Austria-Hungary from 1876 to 1878, left Hesp's stable. After 17 years in Austria-Hungary, Madden went to Germany, to the stable of Prince Hohenlohe-Oehringen.

Kincsem's new jockey arrived in Vienna from England in the spring of 1879, a 23-year-old jockey Archie Wainwright. On 28 April, he rode Kincsem for the first time in a much anticipated race against Tallos, who not met her since finishing second in the 1877 Derby. With three victories in 1878, Tallos was regarded as the clear second-best horse in Austrian-Hungary, despite an unsuccessful trip to England where he faded to fifth in the Cambridgeshire Handicap and was unplaced in the Lincolnshire Handicap, when Isonomy lands the famous gamble. He came into the race against Kincsem with two straight victories in 1879. Vadász- és Versenylap reported that Kincsem was much calmer than her two restless opponents and looked good but not "fit", having had only three or four true workouts before the race. A strong pace was set by three-year-old lightweight Myrtle from Hesp's stable, followed by Kincsem four lengths behind, then Tallos. On halfway, Kincsem moved forward. Tallos made an effort to match the move but Kincsem under 72 kg quickly built up a 10 length lead before turning into the short straight. She cantered home 8 to 10 lengths ahead of Tallos (73.5 kg) "in the midst of the cracking joy of the audience".

Next week in Budapest, Kincsem did not find an opponent in the Gróf Károlyi dij over 3600 meters and won by walkover. On 6 May over 3200 meters, she won by two lengths, beating Austrian Derby and Hungarian St Leger winner Nil Desperandum with her former jockey Madden up. On 8 May, she won by two lengths over 2400 metres, beating the up-and-coming three-year-old Harry Hall, later winner of Hungarian St Leger, giving him the advantage of 24 kg (53 pounds). Unplaced in the field of five runners was Prince Giles The First, who then met Kincsem again on 18 May in Vienna, where he was beaten by 10 lengths over 2800 meters. and 20 May in tenth and final race against Kincsem he was last, being beaten by Kincsem and her pacemaker over 3200 m

The stables then moved to Germany, where the Austro-Hungarian horses won all the major races at the Berlin meeting. Count Henckel's Picklock and Ilona won the Union-Rennen and Stutenrennen (Preis der Diana), and Kincsem won the Silberner Schild Sr. Majestät des Kaisers over 2400 meters. She was not disturbed by a great storm and led all the way, easy beating her stablemate Altona by two lengths with the sole German runner Vitus 20 lengths behind. A great fan of Kincsem, German Emperor Wilhelm I, regardless of the rain and lightning came down from the stand to take a close look at the "Wonder Mare".

The foray in Germany was interrupted in Hannover on the way to the Hamburger Derby meeting. Henckel's horses fell sick, while both Kincsem and Altona refused to drink. Kincsem was shipped home to Göd along with Blaskovich's Purdé, who had been the favourite for the Deutsches Derby but was injured in a workout fall.

After a long break, Kincsem returned to the track on 25 August in Frankfurt, where she rounded the number of victories to 50 in the race supported by her great fan, the Grand Duke of Hesse. Under jockey Wainwright, she led all the way over 2800 meters and won in a canter by four lengths ahead of leading German three-year-old colt Blue Gown, hard ridden by Madden.

A week later, she defended her previous two victories in the Grosser Preis von Baden over 3200 meters, but before that there was an affair with her jockey. Wainwright has been seen shaking hands and talking to a man from a rival stable shortly before the race and Hesp became suspicious that the jockey was bribed. Despite the protests of Wainwright, Hesp replaced him and gave an opportunity to Henckel's skilled jockey Tom Busby, who had been beaten by Kincsem in 32 races before, 17 times as the runner-up. Kincsem under 64.5 kg was the sole Austro-Hungarian raider against Derby winning three-year-old filly Künstlerin from the stable of Prince Hohenlohe-Oehringen, carrying only 51 kg and ridden by Madden. Other runners were Hessenpreis (55.5 kg), the full sister to Tallos, and Rococo (59.5 kg), both sold to German owners from Austro-Hungarian stables. Rococo set a very slow pace on soft ground and the race was turned into a sprint in the stretch, which was against a staying Kincsem. Nonetheless, she held up with the pace and went to the lead after Busby went to the whip. She won by three quarters of a length ahead of Künstlerin, with Hessenpreis a half a length behind in third and Rococo three lengths further back. The finish looked dramatic but Busby reported that he had the result under control and did not need to ask Kincsem for more.

Returning to Hungary, Kincsem won the Államdij in Sopron under Wainwright by walkover after withdrawn of Harry Hall and Prince Giles The First, then won the Ritterdij in Budapest by walkover under Busby. Her final start was in the Kanczadij, where she with Busby up smashed German Oaks winner Ilona by 10 lengths, despite giving her advantage of 14.5 kg (32 pounds).

=== 1880: six-year-old season ===
In January 1880, Vadász- és Versenylap published a short message stating that Kincsem would stay in training as a six-year-old. A later message said that her new jockey would be Tom Osborne. The April issue reported that the Kincsem was as good as ever, having become a bit wider. She had been seen galloping with such ease as before and her legs were as clean as ever. According to the article, she was to run in Budapest and Vienna in May and then travel to Germany and France. That year Kincsem's own brother Szent Marton arrived at Hesp's stable but he proved a disappointment. He was unraced at two, was injured at three in a spring workout, and from two starts on the flat, he gained only one second-place finish and 415 florins in earnings. He was renamed as Marczi and won five small races over hurdles.

Kincsem was supposed to start the season on 2 May in Bratislava but was withdrawn. Two weeks later, a report was published that she had been kicked by a stablemate. Although the bruise healed, Blaskovich decided to retire her. Kincsem went to the National Stud in Kisber and on 26 May, she was covered by Verneuil.

=== Race record ===
Win	Date	Track	Distance (Note: Distances are shown in meters, even for races such as the Goodwood Cup that were actually run in furlongs. For an approximate conversion from meters to furlongs, divide by 200. For example, 1600 meters equals roughly 8 furlongs (one mile))	Race	Runners	Margin (Note: The winning margins vary somewhat from source to source, as was common in an era before photography was available. If the margins differ, the table shows the margins from the sources from the place of the race)	Weight	Earnings (Note: Earnings in Austro-Hungarian florins as they were converted in the era of Kincsem)
1	1876-06-21	Berlin	1000m	Erstes Criterium	4	4 lengths	53.5 kg	1387.50 fl
2	1876-07-02	Hannover	1000m	Vergleichspreis	4	1 length	53.5 kg	1200 fl
3	1876-07-09	Hamburg-Horn	950m	Hamburger Criterium	3	1 1/2 lengths	56.5 kg	1512.50 fl
4	1876-07-29	Doberan	947m	Erinnerungs Rennen	3	1 1/2 lengths	58.5 kg	1375 fl
5	1876-08-20	Frankfurt	1000m	Louisa Rennen	2	10 lengths	58 kg	1687.50 fl
6	1876-08-31	Baden-Baden	1000m	Zukunfts-Rennen	4	2 lengths	56.5 kg	2750 fl
7	1876-10-02	Sopron	1200m	Polgárok Dija	5	15-20 lengths	52.5 kg	4300 fl
8	1876-10-15	Budapest	948m	Kétévesek Versenye	10	1/2 length	56.5 kg	2250 fl
9	1876-10-22	Vienna	1600m	Kladruber Preis	4	5 lengths	55 kg	3300 fl
10	1876-10-29	Prague	1400m	Kladruber Criterium	4	1 1/2 lengths	56 kg	3200 fl
11	1877-04-27	Bratislava	1800m	Trial Stakes (A-H 2000 Guineas)	8	1 length	52.5 kg	5012 fl
12	1877-05-06	Budapest	1600m	Egyesűlt Nemzeti Dij (HUN 2000 Guineas)	4	easy, margin not stated	52 kg	5315 fl
13	1877-05-08	Budapest	1600m	Hazafi Dij (HUN 1000 Guineas)	6	1 1/2 lengths	52 kg	3000 fl
14	1877-05-21	Vienna	2400m	Preis des Jockey-Club (Austrian Derby)	8	2 lengths	54 kg	16950 fl
15	1877-05-24	Vienna	1600m	Trial Stakes	6	2 lengths	57 kg	3020 fl
16	1877-05-27	Vienna	3200m	Kaiserpreis I. Classe	3	10 lengths	50 kg	5350 fl
17	1877-06-24	Hannover	3000m	Grosser Preis von Hannover	5	8 lengths	56 kg	5600 fl
18	1877-07-09	Hamburg-Horn	2800m	Renard Rennen	3	4 lengths	55 kg	2750 fl
19	1877-09-03	Baden-Baden	3200m	Grosser Preis von Baden	3	2 lengths	51 kg	12350 fl
20	1877-09-08	Frankfurt	2400m	Wäldchens Rennen	3	10 lengths	55 kg	3800 fl
21	1877-09-29	Sopron	2400m	Államdij	2	3 lengths	59 kg	1250 fl
22	1877-09-30	Sopron	2000m	Államdij	2	Compromise (Note: "Compromise" is somewhat similar to a walkover but for two horses – after the agreement of the owners, the horses walked or cantered around the track in the agreed order)	52 kg	700 fl
23	1877-10-07	Budapest	2800m	St Leger	8	6 lengths	52 kg	4675 fl
24	1877-10-09	Budapest	2400 m	Kanczadij	3	10 lengths	60.5 kg	2150 fl
25	1877-10-14	Vienna	2400 m	Freudenauer Preis	1	walkover	60.5 kg	1650 fl
26	1877-10-21	Prague	2400m	Kaiserpreis III. Classe	3	1 length	61.5 kg	1150 fl
27	1877-10-23	Prague	3200m	Kaiserpreis II. Classe	1	walkover	61 kg	3525 fl
28	1878-04-22	Vienna	1600m	Eröffnungsrennen	5	2 lengths	65.5 kg	1160 fl
29	1878-04-25	Vienna	2000m	Praterpreis	3	3 lengths	67.5 kg	1025 fl
30	1878-05-04	Bratislava	2400m	Államdij	2	5 lengths	69 kg	1462.50 fl
31	1878-05-14	Budapest	3200m	II. oszt. Államdij	3	5 lengths	67 kg	2737.50 fl
32	1878-05-16	Budapest	2000m	Kisbéri dij	2	2 lengths	69.5 kg	3487.50 fl
33	1878-05-19	Budapest	2400m	I. oszt. Államdij	3	3 lengths	69.5 kg	4550 fl
34	1878-05-26	Vienna	2800m	Staatspreis II. Classe	4	1 length	69.5 kg	3250 fl
35	1878-05-28	Vienna	1600m	Trial Stakes	3	10 lengths	65 kg	2475 fl
36	1878-05-30	Vienna	3200m	Staatspreis I. Classe	2	5 lengths	69.5 kg	5450 fl
37	1878-08-01	Goodwood	4022m	Goodwood Cup	3	2 lengths	54 kg	4800 fl
38	1878-08-18	Deauville	2400m	Grand Prix de Deauville	8	1/2 length	61 kg	7760 fl
39	1878-09-03	Baden-Baden	3200m	Grosser Preis von Baden	5	dead heat 5 lengths in run-off	62.5 kg	10800 fl
40	1878-09-29	Sopron	3200m	Államdij	2	Compromise	69 kg	1700 fl
41	1878-10-20	Budapest	2800m	Ritterdij	1	walkover	61 kg	1625 fl
42	1878-10-22	Budapest	2400m	Kanczadij	2	1/2 length	67.5 kg	2150 fl
43	1879-04-28	Bratislava	2400m	Államdij	3	8-10 lengths	72 kg	1425 fl
44	1879-05-04	Budapest	3600m	Gr. Károlyi-tétverseny	1	walkover	62 kg	2025 fl
45	1879-05-06	Budapest	3200m	II oszt. Államdij	4	2 lengths	73 kg	3337.50 fl
46	1879-05-08	Budapest	2400m	I. Osztályú Állami Dij	5	2 lengths	86,5 kg	4700 fl
47	1879-05-18	Vienna	2800m	Staatspreis II. Classe	2	10 lengths	72.5 kg	3200 fl
48	1879-05-20	Vienna	3200m	Staatspreis I. Classe	3	3 lengths	73 kg	5100 fl
49	1879-06-17	Berlin	2400m	Silberner Schild	3	3 lengths	63.5 kg	7200 fl
50	1879-08-25	Frankfurt	2800m	Ehrenpreis des Landgrafen von Hessen	4	4 lengths	63.5 kg	850 fl
51	1879-09-02	Baden-Baden	3200m	Grosser Preis von Baden	4	3/4 lengths	64.5 kg	11150 fl
52	1879-09-29	Sopron	3200m	II. oszt. Államdij	1	walkover	72 kg	1550 fl
53	1879-10-19	Budapest	2800m	Ritterdij	1	walkover	65 kg	1575 fl
54	1879-10-21	Budapest	2400m	Kanczadij	3	10 lengths	72.5 kg	2000 fl

Source: Vadász- és Versenylap 1876–79, Galopp-Sieger

=== Heading the Unbeaten Flat horses list ===
Unbeaten Flat horses
	Wins	Horse's name	Country	Birth year	Pedigree
1.	54/54 races	Kincsem	Hungary	1874	Cambuscan x Waternymph
2.	25/25 races	Black Caviar	Australia	2006	Bel Esprit x Helsinge
3.	19/19 races	Peppers Pride	USA	2003	Desert God x Lady Pepper
4.	18/18 races	Eclipse	Great Britain	1764	Marske x Spilletta
4.	18/18 races	Karayel	Turkey	1970	Prince Tudor (GB) x Linda (TUR)

== Breeding record ==
Kincsem produced five live foals:

- Budagyöngye (1882), filly by Buccaneer, 14: 4-5-2, classic winner, 23,897.50 fl
- Olyan Nincs (1883), filly by Buccaneer, 34: 8-8-3, classic winner, 32,061 fl
- Talpra Magyar (1885), colt by Buccaneer, 23-2-6-4, 6,531 fl
- Kincsőr (1886), colt by Doncaster, 10: 3-2-1, 17,190 fl
- Kincs (1887), filly by Doncaster, unraced

Vadász- és Versenylap once wrote that Kincsem alone was never sick and never hurt. Her offspring were not always so fortunate.

Kincsem was barren when covered by Verneuil in 1880. In 1881, she was again covered by Verneuil but was reported barren, so was subsequently covered by Buccaneer, which was successful. Kincsem produced her first foal on 1 January 1882 at five in the afternoon at the train station in Buda – Kincsem had been travelling to Kisber in anticipation of her next breeding session during her "foal heat". The filly was named Budagyöngye – Pearl of Buda. She was a promising two-year-old with three victories and three seconds, but was injured in the spring of her three-year-old campaign before the classic season. After three bad runs, she finished third in Austrian Derby at odds of 40–1, then was 2nd in the Union Rennen. The highlight of her career came with a victory in the Deutsches Derby. Before the Grosser Preis von Baden, she was injured again and went to stud. She produced two classic winning fillies, Viglány and Dicso, and become a highly influential broodmare. From her branch of Kincsem's female family among others become 29 classic winners in 11 European countries, including Calandria (French St Leger), Oberon (Derby Italiano), Polygamy (Epsom Oaks), Camelot (2000 Guineas, Epsom Derby, Irish Derby) and most recently Constitution River (French Derby).

Olyan Nincs raced from age two to four. In the spring of her three-year-old campaign, she developed a cough, but recovered by the fall to win five races, including the Hungarian St Leger. She also become a highly influential broodmare. From her branch of Kincsem's female family came 33 classic winners in 8 European countries, including Falada (German Oaks), Wolke (German Oaks and Derby), Wauthi (German 2000 Guineas and St Leger), Wahnfried and Wicht (both German St Leger), Walesiana and Well Proved (both German 1000 Guineas), Widschi (German 2000 Guineas) and German Derby winners Windstoss and Weltstar.

After the birth of Olyan Nincs, a false report that Kincsem had died was published in the newspaper Neues Wiener Tagblatt on March 7, 1883. That year (1883) Kincsem was not covered. She struggled with a chronic nasal discharge and was shipped to the Imperial Stud Fogaras (Făgăraș, now Romania) where she underwent surgery in February 1884 on the forehead and nasal bones. Soon after the surgery, she went to Kisber to be covered by Buccaneer, and in 1885 produced her first colt. Talpra Magyar was named after the Hungarian national poem Nemzeti dal, also known as "Talpra Magyar". He was considered quite promising after two second-place finishes at two. At three he won his first start, beating the Austro-Hungarian Triple Crown winner and Ascot Gold Cup third Buzgo. After that race though, he developed a heavy cough. He became a roarer and fell sharply in class. He later won one selling race and was bought by Johannes Frohner, who sent him to his stud Karolina-udvar (Carolinenhof). In his first crop, Talpra Magyar sired 2 winners from 2 foals, including probably the most popular horse in Austria-Hungary since Kincsem, the very small but exceptional fighter Tokio, winner of 23 races including the Austro-Hungarian Triple Crown, Grosser Preis von Berlin and Grosser Preis von Baden. After the death of Frohner in 1894, when Tokio was two years old, Talpra Magyar was sold to Germany and sired Hut Ab (Preis der Diana), Xamete (Grosser Preis von Berlin and Grosser Preis von Baden) and Faith (Austrian Oaks).

Her next colt was Kincsőr (Treasurer), winner of one race from five starts at age two. At three he improved rapidly. After two places to start the year, he won the Cambuscan Rennen, then was second in the Austrian Derby and won the Buccaneer Rennen. He was heavily wagered on before the Deutsches Derby – he fell from 7–2 to Evens, and his last price was 2-10. However, he developed colic shortly after arrival in Hamburg. He struggled for a few days and on the day before the Derby, he was withdrawn. He died shortly before the race, won by his stablemate Uram bátyám.

The last foal of Kincsem was Kincs (Treasure), born on 6 February 1887. She was injured in a training accident and was unraced. She was a useful broodmare, producing classic winning fillies Napfeny and Csokos-Asszony, and another two in the next generations, but her branch of Kincsem's female family no longer exists.

On 12 March 1887, Kincsem developed colic and despite all available care she died on 16 March 1887, a day before her thirteenth birthday. (Note: According to primary sources, Kincsem died 1 day before her actual 13th birthday, although it is usually reported that she died on that birthday. Regardless, she was still considered 13 years old as all Thoroughbreds in the Northern Hemisphere have an official birthday of January 1 for the purposes of determining their age.) Vadász- és Versenylap published a more detailed tribute on the front page of their next edition, but the main newspapers reported her death in a few brief articles. Shortly after Kincsem's death, on 25 April 1887, her former trainer Robert Hesp died of pulmonary edema at a Vienna hospital at the age of 64.

Kincsem's corpse was sent to the Veterinary institute in Budapest and the autopsy revealed she died of a worm aneurysm, (Note: A worm aneurysm results from damage to the walls of the artery due to larvae of strongylus vulgaris) specifically "Thrombosis and embolism caused by colonization of Sclerostomum armatum in the aneurysmal mesenteric artery, which had led to blockage of the artery, edematous, inflammatory and hemorrhagic processes in the intestinal membranes, paralysis of the same and congestion in the mesenteric veins and in the portal vein."

Kincsem's skeleton was preserved and is on display in the Museum of Hungarian Agriculture.

== Legacy ==
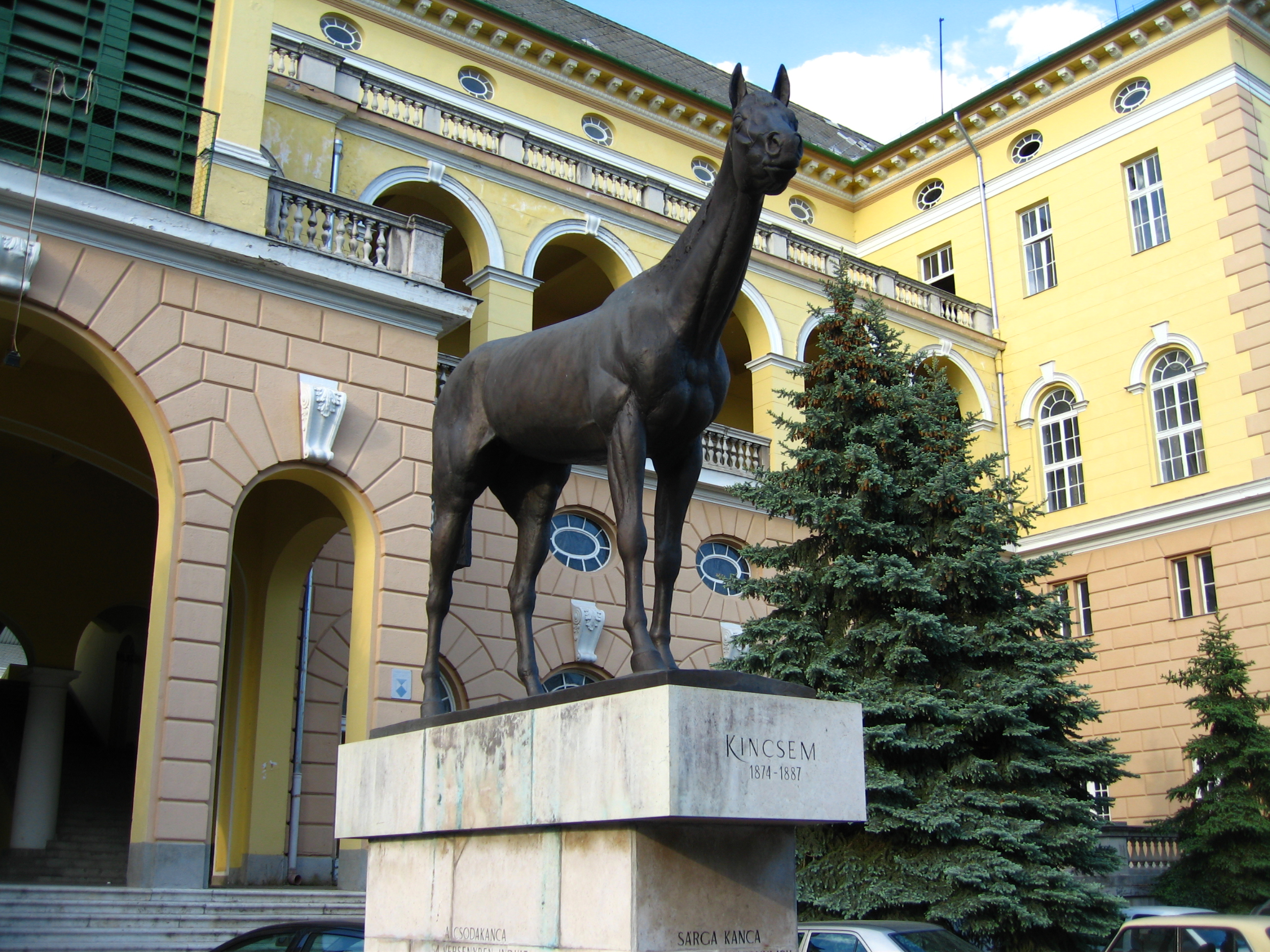
Life-sized statue at Kincsem Park, Budapest

Kincsem Park, Hungary's premier racecourse and located in Budapest, is named in her honour. There is a life sized statue of her by the entrance to the old grandstand. Blaskovich's stud farm now houses the Kincsem Equestrian Park and Kincsem Museum, which contains a room devoted to the mare's career. Streets named for Kincsem are in Tápiószentmárton, where she was born, in Kisbér where she died, in Göd, where she was trained, and in Dunakeszi, the biggest training centre in Hungary. There is also a Kincsem Street in Iffezheim (Baden Baden). Kincsem's training stable in Göd was abandoned for many years but in 2016-17 was reconstructed and a statue Kincsem was placed there. Many small businesses around the stable are named after her. A photo of the skeleton of Kincsem was used in an advertisement for her descendant Westorkan in 1967.

When including Kincsem in his book of the 100 Greatest Racehorses, racing commentator Julian Wilson noted that although the competition she faced in Hungary was difficult to evaluate, she was "probably one of the best mares to ever race in Europe." Taking into account her ability to handle heavy weights and the range of distances over which she was successful, turf historian Richard Sowers wrote that there was "little question that [she] compares favorably with any Thoroughbred in history."

=== Film ===
A Hungarian film, Kincsem — Bet on Revenge, directed by Gábor Herendi, was released in 2017. The feature film presented Kincsem's history with fictitious details. The movie set a record as the most expensive domestic movie ever produced with a total cost of 3 billion forint (~$10 million). The Hungarian National Film Fund contributed 2,078 billion forint toward the total production cost. The movie was released in Hungarian cinemas on 16 March 2017 and was later shown at the Cannes Film Festival.

=== Automotive tribute ===
In 2021, Tibor Bak (a Swiss-based Hungarian who named his company after the racehorse) showed proposals for an electric hypercar called the Kincsem Hyper-GT, with 54 production models due to be built as a tribute to the 54 races that the horse won.

== Pedigree ==
Although Kincsem is Hungarian bred, her pedigree is mainly British. She was also the result of a mistake: Blaskovich had planned to breed his mare Waternymph to Buccaneer, but instead the mare was mated with Cambuscan. Both stallions had been imported from England to stand at the Hungarian National Stud. Cambuscan had earned nine victories including the July Stakes during four seasons of racing. Originally retired to stud in England, Cambuscan was not considered a great success though he did sire 2000 Guineas winner Camballo. In his new country, Cambuscan sired multiple champions including Altona (won Preis der Diana, Kanczadij - Hungarian Oaks), Illona (Preis der Diana, Kanczadij - Hungarian Oaks, Nemzeti dij - Hungarian 2000 Guineas), Gamiani (German Derby), Mereny (Preis der Diana, Kanczadij - Hungarian Oaks, Union-Rennen), Isolani (Nemzeti dij - Hungarian 2000 Guineas, Hungarian St Leger), La Gondola (Grosser Preis von Baden), Gyongyvirág (Zukunfts Rennen, Kanczadij - Hungarian Oaks), Cambrian (Kanczadij - Hungarian Oaks), Frangepan (Hungarian St Leger), Czimer (Union-Rennen) and Pasztor (Hungarian St Leger).

Kincsem's dam Waternymph (or Water Nymph in some sources) won the Hungarian equivalent of the Oaks and 2000 Guineas. In addition to Kincsem, Waternymph also produced Hungarian Oaks winner Harmat. Waternymph was a daughter of British sire Cotswold, who had been imported to Germany in 1858. The Hungarian studbook lists The Mermaid as Waternymph's dam, a British mare who had won the King John Stakes as a two-year-old. Kincsem's full pedigree can be found on the Jockey Club's official online database, Equineline.

Pedigree of Kincsem (HUN), chestnut mare, 1874
Sire Cambuscan (GB) 1861	Newminster; 1848	Touchstone	Camel
Sire Cambuscan (GB) 1861	Newminster; 1848	Touchstone	Banter
Sire Cambuscan (GB) 1861	Newminster; 1848	Beeswing	Doctor Syntax
Sire Cambuscan (GB) 1861	Newminster; 1848	Beeswing	Ardrossan mare (1817)
Sire Cambuscan (GB) 1861	The Arrow; 1850	Slane	Royal Oak
Sire Cambuscan (GB) 1861	The Arrow; 1850	Slane	Orville mare (1819)
Sire Cambuscan (GB) 1861	The Arrow; 1850	Southdown	Defence
Sire Cambuscan (GB) 1861	The Arrow; 1850	Southdown	Feltona
Dam Waternymph (HUN) 1860	Cotswold (GB); 1853	Newcourt	Sir Hercules
Dam Waternymph (HUN) 1860	Cotswold (GB); 1853	Newcourt	Sylph
Dam Waternymph (HUN) 1860	Cotswold (GB); 1853	Aurora	Pantaloon
Dam Waternymph (HUN) 1860	Cotswold (GB); 1853	Aurora	Lady
Dam Waternymph (HUN) 1860	The Mermaid (GB); 1853	Melbourne	Humphry Clinker
Dam Waternymph (HUN) 1860	The Mermaid (GB); 1853	Melbourne	Cervantes mare (1825)
Dam Waternymph (HUN) 1860	The Mermaid (GB); 1853	Seaweed	Slane
Dam Waternymph (HUN) 1860	The Mermaid (GB); 1853	Seaweed	Seakale (Family: 4-o)

== See also ==
- List of leading Thoroughbred racehorses
- List of racehorses
- Repeat winners of horse races
