= Red Book =

Red Book, Redbook or Redbooks may refer to:

== Political pamphlets ==
- The Little Red Book of Quotations from Chairman Mao Tse-tung
- Red Book (Liberal Party of Canada), policy platform for the 1993 election
- Red Book (Albania), memorandum for the autonomy of Albania
- The Charter of the Malagasy Socialist Revolution (the Red Book, Malagasy: Boky Mena), published in 1975

== Reference books and standards ==
=== Medicine and health care ===
- AAP Red Book, pediatric infectious diseases
- Personal Child Health Record, used by the National Health Service of the UK
- Red Book, a drug reference published by Thomson Reuters
- Red Book, nickname for the Statement of Fees and Allowances, adopted by the UK General medical services in 1990 and abolished in 2004
- Red Book, US guide to prescription medicines published by Thomson, including data such as average wholesale price

=== Science and computers ===
- IUPAC Red Book, nomenclature of inorganic chemistry
- IUPAP Red Book, of symbols, units, nomenclature, and fundamental constants in physics
- Red Book, alternate name for NTIA Manual of Regulations and Procedures for Federal Radio Frequency Management, technical regulations relating to electromagnetic frequency spectrum
- Red Book, a series of recommendations published by the CCITT (now ITU-T) in 1956–1964, and in 1984
- Red Book, a British computer networking protocol from the 1980s, one of the Coloured Book standards
- Red Book, a.k.a. Trusted Network Interpretation, part of the Rainbow Series by the National Computer Security Center
- Red Book, American name for one of the Japanese naval codes during World War II
- The Red Book, alternate name for the 8th edition of the OpenGL Programming Guide
- The Red Book, alternate name for the 3rd edition of the PostScript Language Reference
- The Red Book, one of the Rainbow Books, outlining the standard for Compact Disc Digital Audio, originally produced in 1980 by the format's joint creators, Sony and Philips

=== Other reference books and standards ===
- Red Book, one of the progenitors, along with the Green Book of Lloyd's Register
- Red Book, nickname for A Guide Book of United States Coins by R. S. Yeoman, an overview and pricing guide
- The Red Book, nickname for the Church of Scotland Yearbook
- Red Book, US guide for risk assessment by National Research Council
- Red Books of Humphry Repton, plans for landscape gardens by British designer Humphry Repton
- Redbooks, alternative name for firefighter training manuals published by the International Fire Service Training Association
- The Red Book, alternative name for the RICS Appraisal and Valuation Standards, the professional guidelines for real estate valuers in the UK
- The Redbook: A Manual on Legal Style by Bryan A. Garner
- AAUP Policy Documents and Reports, a.k.a. the Redbook, by the American Association of University Professors
- Iowa Official Register, a biannual publication of Iowa government and history
- Red Book, a model contract for construction by the Federation Internationale des Ingenieurs-Conseil (FIDIC)

== Lists of endangered entities ==
- Red Book of Endangered Species, international listing (since 1948)
- The Red Book of the Peoples of the Russian Empire (1991)
- Red Book of Endangered Languages, a comprehensive list of the world's languages facing extinction (2009)
- Red Book of Ukraine, a list of endangered animals and plants that live in Ukraine

== Manuscripts ==
- Red Book of the Exchequer, a 13th-century manuscript in England
- Red Book of Hergest, a medieval Welsh manuscript
- The Red Book (Jung), manuscript of Carl Gustav Jung
- Red Book of Clanranald, on clan history, literature, and poems
- Red Book of Munster (Leabhar Ruadh Muimhneach), a lost c. 1400 Irish genealogical work by Murchadh Ó Cuindlis
- Red Book of Ossory, produced in Kilkenny, Ireland, a medieval manuscript
- Liturgia Svecanae Ecclesiae catholicae & orthodoxae conformia, which sought to reintroduce elements of Catholic liturgy during the Swedish liturgical struggle, alternately called RED BOOK

== Music ==
- Red Book (album), a 2005 album by Texas

== Other uses ==
- Harvard Redbook, a 1945 report on the role of general education in American secondary schools
- Redbook, an American women's magazine
- Red Book of Westmarch, a fictional manuscript written by Hobbits, a conceit of author J. R. R. Tolkien
- The Red Book (film), 1994 experimental film
- Red Book (C&S), nickname for the first edition of the Chivalry & Sorcery role-playing game
- Red Book of Varieties and Schemes, lecture notes by mathematician David Mumford on the theory of schemes
- The Beige Book, a report on the state of the US economy by the US Federal Reserve Board, known as the Red Book from 1970 to 1983
- RedNote, a social networking platform also known as "little red book"
- Akahon mangas that heavily featured red printing as a means of cheaply producing color printed comics , alternately called RED BOOK)

== See also ==
- Monty Python's Big Red Book, a humour book first published in 1971
- Little Red Book (disambiguation)
- Black Book (disambiguation)
- Blue book (disambiguation)
- Brown Book (disambiguation)
- Gold Book
- Green Book (disambiguation)
- Orange Book (disambiguation)
- Pink Book (disambiguation)
- Plum Book
- Purple Book (disambiguation)
- White book (disambiguation)
- Yellow Book (disambiguation)
