= Blue book =

Blue book may refer to:

== Academia and education ==
- Blue book exam, a type of school test in the US
- Bluebook, a testing application by the College Board in the US
- Blue and Brown Books, notes taken during lectures by Ludwig Wittgenstein 1933–1935
- The Oceanic Languages, or the "blue book", a 2002 reference work about the Oceanic family of languages

== Science and technology ==
- Blue Book (CD standard), a compact disc media format
- Smalltalk-80: The Language and its Implementation, or the "blue book", about the programming language
- Blue Book, one of the Coloured Book protocols for computer networks the UK in the 1970s
- The blue book, the Java virtual machine specification
- The Complexity of Boolean Functions, or the "blue book", by Ingo Wegener
- WHO Blue Books, a series of World Health Organization books classifying tumors
- Nomenclature of Organic Chemistry, or the "Blue Book", by IUPAC

== Government ==
=== In the United Kingdom ===
- British Blue Books, collections of diplomatic correspondence
- United Kingdom National Accounts – The Blue Book, an annual report
- Blue books, a synonym for the Colonial Annual Reports, a series of reports produced by HM Stationery Office for the Colonial Office (1887 to 1975)
- Treachery of the Blue Books, or the Blue Books, a controversial 1847 British government report about education in Wales
- Blue Book (Bryce and Toynbee book), a 1916 government report on the Armenian genocide

- The Blue Book, Political Truth or Historical Fact, a 2009 documentary film about the report

- Report on the Natives of South-West Africa and their Treatment by Germany, a 1918 report about German colonial atrocities and especially the Herero and Nama genocide

=== In the United States ===
- Blue Book (FCC), Public Service Responsibility of Broadcast Licensees, a 1946 report
- Blue Book (United States Marine Corps), documenting seniority of Marine Corps officers
- Project Blue Book, a U.S. Air Force study on UFOs in the 1950s and 1960s
  - Project Blue Book (TV series), 2019
- Regulations for the Order and Discipline of the Troops of the United States, or the "Blue Book", a Revolutionary War drill manual
- Blue Book, American name for one of the World War II Japanese naval codes
- Official Manual State of Missouri, or the "Missouri Blue Book"
- Oregon Blue Book, the official directory and fact book for Oregon
- Tennessee Blue Book, the official government manual for Tennessee
- Wisconsin Blue Book, a biennial publication of the Wisconsin's Legislative Reference Bureau

=== Elsewhere ===
- Australian Blue Book, a national reference book 1942–1950
- Traineeship scheme of the European Commission, or the Blue Book Traineeship
- Diplomatic Bluebook of Japan, an annual report on Japan's foreign policy
- Serbian Blue Book, a collection of diplomatic documents about events 29 June – 6 August 1914

== Transportation ==
- Aircraft bluebook, a value guide for used aircraft
- Automobile Blue Book, a 1901–1929 series of road guides for American motorists
- Kelley Blue Book, an American vehicle valuation and automotive research company

== Other uses ==
- Bluebook, a style guide for legal citation in the US
- Blue Book (magazine) (1905–1975)
- Blue Book (racing), a list of thoroughbred racehorses
- Who's Who in Denver Society, or the Blue Book, originally by Louise Sneed Hill
- The Blue Book of the John Birch Society, a transcript of the society's founding meeting
- The Blue Book Network, a marketing, workflow software and print media company, publishing a directory of construction subcontractors and suppliers
- Blue booking, a role-playing game term
- Blaubuch ('Blue Book'), a list of culturally important sites in eastern Germany
- Blue books, guides to the red light district of New Orleans known as Storyville in the early 20th century

== See also ==
- The Blue Pages (disambiguation)
- Blue paper, a paper specification used by artists
- Black Book (disambiguation)
- Green Book (disambiguation)
- Red Book (disambiguation)
- Little Blue Books, a 20th century paperback book series
- Big Blue Books, a 20th century paperback book series
- The Wee Blue Book, a 2014 Scottish pro-independence publication
- Ireland Blue Book, a 2023 Canadian comedy film
