= Black Book =

Black Book, Black book or Blackbook may refer to:

== Film ==
- Black Book (film), a 2006 Dutch thriller film by director Paul Verhoeven
  - Black Book (soundtrack), soundtrack of the 2006 film
- The Black Book (serial), a 1929 American drama film serial
- The Black Book, alternative name for the 1949 American drama film Reign of Terror, set in the French Revolution
- The Black Book (2018 film), a 2018 Portuguese film directed by Valeria Sarmiento
- The Black Book (2023 film), a 2023 Nigerian film starring Richard Mofe-Damijo

== Literature ==
- A cyprianus (Norwegian: Svarteboken), a spell-book of Scandinavian tradition
- Melnā grāmata, a book of magic in Latvian tradition

=== Non-fiction ===
- The Black Book (list), the list produced in 1940 of people to be arrested by the Gestapo following a planned Nazi invasion of Britain in the Second World War
- The Black Book (Morrison book), a 1974 book by Toni Morrison
- The Black Book of Capitalism, a 1998 book that assigns blame for what it argues are historic repressions to capitalism
- The Black Book of Capitalism: A Farewell to Market Economy, a 1999 book written by Robert Kurz
- The Black Book of Colonialism, a 2003 book documenting evils that it attributes to colonialism
- The Black Book of Communism, a 1997 book that catalogs crimes that it argues resulted from the pursuit of communism
- The Black Book of English Canada, a 2001 book detailing evils that it attributes to English-speaking Canada
- The Black Book: Imbalance of Power and Wealth in the Sudan, a 2000 dissident publication
- The Black Book of Poland, a 1942 summary of the Nazi German atrocities in occupied Poland published by the Polish Ministry of Information
- The Black Book of Polish Jewry, a 1943 statement of the Association of Jewish Refugees and Immigrants from Poland on the Holocaust of Polish Jews
- The Black Book of Soviet Jewry, a 1944 compilation of documentary reports about the actions of Nazis against Jews in Eastern Europe during the Holocaust
- Black Books (Jung), a posthumous collection of Carl Jung's private journals published in October 2020
- Berlin Black Book owned by Prince of Albania, compiled during World War I by Germany and allegedly containing long list of British perverts, described in the 1918 article by Harold Spencer published by Noel Pemberton-Billing
- Talaat Pasha's Black Book, or The Remaining Documents of Talaat Pasha, a 2008 book by Murat Bardakçı
- The Black Book, a catalog of American precancel stamps
- Black Book of Pushbacks, a 2020 book about abuse of migrants in the Balkans compiled by Border Violence Monitoring Network
- Graphics Programming Black Book, a 1997 book by Michael Abrash

=== Creative writing ===
- The Black Book (Durrell novel), a 1938 novel by Lawrence Durrell
- The Black Book (Pamuk novel), a 1990 novel by Turkish novelist Orhan Pamuk
- The Black Book (Rankin novel), a 1993 novel by Scottish writer Ian Rankin
- Black Book (novel), a 2006 novel derived from the 2006 film Black Book
- The Black Book (Patterson novel), a 2017 novel by James Patterson and David Ellis
- BlackBook, an arts and culture magazine

=== Manuscripts ===
- Black Book of Carmarthen, one of the earliest surviving manuscripts written entirely in Welsh
- Yazidi Black Book, one of the two holy books of the Yazidi religion (Kurdish language)
- Black Book of Clanranald, on Clan history, literature and poems

== Television ==
- "The Black Book" (Danger Man), a 1965 episode
- "The Black Book" (Garfield and Friends), a 1989 episode
- "The Black Book" (Rebus), a 2006 episode
- "The Black Book" (Midsomer Murders), a 2009 episode
- Black Books, a British sitcom
- Blackbook - TV talk show focused on African Americans; created by WFIL-TV in Philadelphia between 1969-1971

== Other uses ==
- Black Book (National Auto Research), a vehicle appraisal service
- Black Book (gambling), a nickname for a list of individuals blacklisted from casinos
- Black books of hours, Flemish illuminated manuscripts, created on black dyed vellum.
- Black Book (video game), an adventure role-playing video game
- A traditional or Wiccan name for a grimoire, the personal guide book to ritual kept by every practicing witch, or other text instructing in magic
- Black book, a slang term for a graffiti artist's notebook or sketchbook
- Black books, records of Lincoln's Inn, a barristers association in London
- The Black Book (album)

== See also ==
- Address book
- Black Book of the Admiralty, a collection of medieval maritime law
- Book of Negroes, a 1783 list of the Black Loyalists, those African Americans who fought for the British Crown
- Liber Niger (disambiguation), Latin for "Black Book"
- Il libro nero, 1951 novel by Giovanni Papini
- Little black book (disambiguation)
- Blue book (disambiguation)
- Green Book (disambiguation)
- Orange Book (disambiguation)
- Pink Book (disambiguation)
- Plum Book
- White book (disambiguation)
- Yellow Book (disambiguation)
