= Group races =

Class of thoroughbred horse racing

Group races, also known as Pattern races, or Graded races in some jurisdictions, are the highest level of races in Thoroughbred horse racing. They include most of the world's iconic races, such as the Derby, Irish Derby and Prix de l'Arc de Triomphe in Europe, the Melbourne Cup in Australia, and the Kentucky Derby and Breeders' Cup races in the United States. Victory in these races marks a horse as being particularly talented, if not exceptional, and they are extremely important in determining stud values. They are also sometimes referred to as Black type races, since any horse that has won or placed in one of these races is printed in bold type in sales catalogues.

The International Grading and Race Planning Advisory Committee (IRPAC), part of the International Federation of Horseracing Authorities (IFHA), enforces quality standards for the designation of group and graded races internationally.

== Group race system ==
The Group race system divides races into one of four categories, based on their prestige and quality.

Group/Grade 1

The highest level, for races with major international importance considered to be of championship standard, including Classics. Examples include the Prix de l'Arc de Triomphe, Epsom Derby, 2000 Guineas Stakes, Kentucky Derby, Breeders' Cup Classic, Irish Champion Stakes, Melbourne Cup, Japan Cup, Dubai World Cup, Hong Kong Cup and Gran Premio Carlos Pellegrini.

Group/Grade 2

Races that have significant international importance, but are below a championship standard. Examples include the Doncaster Cup, Prix Niel, Black-Eyed Susan Stakes, Sandown Guineas, Gran Premio del Jockey Club, Mainichi Ōkan, and Grande Prêmio Bento Gonçalves.

Group/Grade 3

Other races of note, mainly of national rather than international importance. Examples include the Ormonde Stakes, Royal Whip Stakes, British Columbia Derby, Hawkesbury Gold Cup, and Challenge Cup.

Listed

Races below the standard of graded or group races, but still run by horses of notable merit and performance quality.

== History ==
In 1943, Lord Ilchester's Racing Reorganisation Committee first proposed the idea of a planned racing program for Great Britain. This idea was returned to in 1965, when the Duke of Norfolk's Pattern of Racing Committee proposed formalizing a comprehensive Pattern of black type races with an emphasis on high-class, non-handicap races, limited in number and spread throughout the season to encourage the best horses to face each other. With the general principles laid out, Lord Porchester headed a further committee in 1967 to identify specific races, both in Britain and in other countries.

By the late 1960s, a state of crisis had developed with regards to international racing in Europe. At the time, weight penalties were determined by the amount of money won. French races were significantly richer than those in other European countries, resulting in complaints that many important French races were being "plundered" by foreign horses carrying less weight. Pressure was being applied to restrict races to only horses trained in France in order to prevent this, which would have greatly hampered the increase in international racing.

British, French, and Irish authorities met in 1970 to discuss developing a Pattern race system, and in 1971 the European Pattern Committee was established and the first European Pattern published.

European authorities began to push North American jurisdictions to develop a similar system designating prominent races to promote international competition. In 1973, the Thoroughbred Owners and Breeders Association (TOBA) began a project grading North American stakes races and American races were first designated with graded designations, mirroring group designations in Europe.

The categorical system stakes races began to spread to other countries, with Germany and Italy soon joining Great Britain, France, and Ireland in the European Pattern, Brazil starting to designate group races in 1975, Australia introducing group races in 1976, New Zealand doing the same in 1979, and Japan implementing a graded race structure in 1984, among other countries.

In 1983, the International Cataloguing Standards Committee (ICSC) and Society of International Thoroughbred Auctioneers were created and the first International Cataloguing Standards Booklet was published, with the objective of preventing discrepancies and imbalances in the designation of Group or Grade and black type status among different jurisdictions.

In 1984, the United States Graded Stakes Committee granted the seven new Breeders' Cup races Grade 1 status, despite having never been run before, an unprecedented move.

In 2015, the Commonwealth Cup became the first new race inaugurated with Group 1 status in the history of the European Pattern.

== Black type ==
In 1952, for their sales catalogs, Fasig-Tipton began to designate stakes winners in a pedigree using bold-face type, with winners in all caps and stakes-placed runners in mixed case, in an attempt to show buyers and breeders horses and races of note. Keeneland followed suit in 1960. In 1963, Blood Horse published the first edition of Cataloguing Standards for foreign racing. Two years later, the Jockey Club Statistical Bureau took over publication.

The International Cataloguing Standards Committee (ICSC) and Society of International Thoroughbred Auctioneers (SITA) later defined more precisely specific races in which horses could earn black type.

In 1971, the Australian Conference of Principal Race Clubs (ACPRC) developed a list of Principal Races that qualified for black type.

By the mid-1980s, international agreement had been made that all graded/group races would qualify for black type designation. In 1985, concern was raised regarding a lack of opportunity to earn black type in North American compared to Europe due to the lower percentage of stakes races. This led to the development of ungraded or non-listed black type races in North America. In 1985, unrestricted allowance or handicap races with a purse of $30,000 or greater were given black type status and designated with a Q for Qualified Race. Other added money or black type races were designated with an O or OR. In 1986, new rules for black type status in North American races were drawn up, defining listed stakes with purses of $50,000 or more and other added-money stakes with purses of $15,000 (raised to $20,000 in 1987) to $49,999. The minimum purse to qualify for black type status for other added-money stakes was raised to $25,000 starting in 1990.

Over the years, the minimum purse for black type status in North American races has increased, and is $50,000 as of 2023.

In 2012, the North American ICSC introduced a scoring system to determine whether or not non-listed stakes should be granted black type. Since 2014, each race is assigned a Race Quality Score (RQS), based on speed figures for the top four finishers with data from Bloodstock Research Information Services (BRIS), Beyer Speed Figure from Daily Racing Form, Equibase, and Thoro-Graph. The three-year average RQS must meet a minimum for the race's age/sex division, or it loses black type status.

=== Black type status ===
From 1971 to 1984, the top three finishers in a Graded/Group race were granted black type status. In 1985, this was expanded to the top four finishers in Graded/Group races and the top three finishers in qualified races in North America. Starting in 1989, races in Part III countries were no longer recognized as black type and rules were amended so that only in Group/Grade 1 races were the top four finishers granted black type. The following year, the rules were once again amended, so that only the top three finishers in black type races are granted black type status.

The recognition of the black type status of jump races is based on regional preference.

== By country and region ==
=== Australia ===
In Australia, the Australian Pattern Committee recommends to the Australian Racing Board (ARB) which races shall be designated as Group races. The list of races approved by the ARB is accepted by the International Cataloguing Standards Committee (ICSC) for publication by The Jockey Club (US) in The Blue Book, thus providing international recognition for Australia's best races.

Minimum purse values for group races in Australia are as follows:

- Group 1 - A$350,000
- Group 2 - A$175,000
- Group 3 - A$115,000
- Listed Races - A$80,000

Australia has a total of approximately 540 to 550 Group races from a season total of almost 21,000 races. These races were collectively known as Principal Races until about 1979.

Handicap races in Australia are eligible for group status.

The Asian Pattern Committee is the accepted authority for Group and Listed status in Australia.

=== Europe ===
In Europe the designation of flat races is agreed by the European Pattern Committee. The Committee grades races depending on the average official ratings achieved by the first four finishers in a race over a three-year period. There is no minimum purse money across Europe. The breakdown is as follows:

- Group 1 - Minimum official rating of 115 (110 for 3-year-old or older fillies' and mares or two-year-old races, 105 for two-year-old fillies' races)
- Group 2 - Minimum official rating of 110 (105 for 3-year-old or older fillies' and mares or two-year-old races, 100 for two-year-old fillies' races)
- Group 3 - Minimum official rating of 105 (100 for 3-year-old or older fillies' and mares or two-year-old races, 95 for two-year-old fillies' races)
- Listed - Minimum official rating of 100 (95 for 3-year-old or older fillies' and mares or two-year-old races, 90 for two-year-old fillies' races)

Under the European Pattern, Group and Listed races may not be run as a Handicap (with the exception of the now discontinued European Free Handicap), may not be divided into two or more divisions, may not have a standard entry fee exceeding 2% of the purse, must be open to geldings (excepting Group 1 races restricted to two- or three-year-olds), and must have a permanent element in the title. In addition, Group 1 races may only have sex and weight-for-age allowances, with no other weight penalties.

France, Germany, Great Britain, and Ireland are the member countries of the European Pattern Committee, with Italy, Scandinavia (Denmark, Norway, and Sweden), and Turkey as associate members.

The pattern system, overseen by the European Pattern Committee, is fluid and the Group status of key races can change. By this method, the Prince of Wales's Stakes at Royal Ascot was upgraded from Group 2 to Group 1 in the year 2000. However, a number of checks and balances are in place which ensure that changes to the Pattern are gradual and evolutionary, thereby giving the racing industry time to adjust. In particular, the current European Pattern Committee "Ground Rules" explicitly state that no race may be upgraded by more than one Group in any one year.

The minimum purse values for some group races in Great Britain are as follows:

- Group 1- £250,000 (£200,000 for two-year-old races)
- Group 2 - £100,000 (£80,000 for two-year-old races)

=== Hong Kong ===
There are 31 Group races held in Hong Kong. All group 1 races were held in the Sha Tin Racecourse.

=== Japan ===
The Asian Pattern Committee is the accepted authority for Group and Listed status in Japan, and the Japanese Graded Stakes Committee monitors and approves the grading system. Prior to 1984, races in Japan were not held under Group status.

All Japan Racing Association (JRA) graded stakes were opened to foreign-trained horses in 2010.

=== North America ===
In the United States and Canada, the equivalent are known as graded stakes races.

The Thoroughbred Owners and Breeders Association (TOBA) manages the American Graded Stakes Committee, which manages the determination of black type and grading of races in the United States.

Minimum purse requirements for races are as follows:

- Grade I - $300,000
- Grade II - $200,000
- Grade III - $100,000
- Listed and ungraded - $75,000

Graded races may be run in divisions (so long as the total purse among all the divisions is at least 150% that of the original purse) and may be handicaps.

From 1973 to 1997, TOBA also graded Canadian races, but in 1998 the Jockey Club of Canada established the Canadian Graded Stakes Committee to take over the task.

In 2012, the North American International Cataloging Standards Committee announced the implementation of additional quality control requirements for non-listed black type races in North America.

=== South America ===
The Organización Sudamericana de Fomento del Sangre Pura de Carrera (OSAF) oversees the grading of stakes races in Argentina, Brazil, Chile, Peru, Uruguay and Venezuela.

=== United Arab Emirates ===
The Asian Pattern Committee is the accepted authority for Group and Listed status in the United Arab Emirates.

== Jump races ==
The designation of graded status for jumps races is determined by individual countries.

Among countries that run recognized jump races, the Czech Republic, France, Great Britain, Ireland, Italy, Japan, Switzerland, and the United States recognize some sort of Group/Grade status for jump races.

== Purpose ==
The primary purpose of the Group race system is to determine and designate racing class so as to coordinate a unified program of quality races. It therefore simultaneously acts as a scheduling tool for trainers and owners and as a measurement of racing class for breeders and buyers. Success in a Group/Grade 1 race is often a determining factor in the acquisition of breeding stock, and wins in Group/Graded races increase a horse's value.

Having international standards allows for comparisons of horses racing in different countries, with a general minimum standard expected of races of a given Group/Grade, regardless of what country run in.

The broad acceptance and use of the Group race system allows for it to be used as a promotional tool.

== Criticisms and challenges ==
Over the years, multiple criticisms of how black type and Group/Grade status is designated in various countries have been raised.

Constraints of internationally agreed upon standards can create challenges for individual countries and isolated situations, acting against the commercial and racecourse interests.

Despite declining foal crops in many countries, the number of Pattern races has remained fairly steady or even increased. Horses can gain black type by running in stakes races with a low standard and/or small field, even if they run at a lower level that would not ordinarily merit such designation.

New races with large purses, such as The Everest, have gained considerable prestige, despite lacking Group or Graded recognition. Peter V'landys, CEO of Racing New South Wales and creator of the Everest, claims that the Pattern "breeds apathy" and "is a restraint to trade." Racing Australia Chairman John Messara claims that the Pattern is under threat due to the consequent undervaluing of the Pattern.

The exclusion of handicap races from black type consideration in the European Pattern results in many highly rated horses opting for rich handicap races rather than stakes races and being denied black type, despite being of equal or greater rating than other black type horses.

Due to being based on the performance of horses in previous years, criticism has been raised against the designation of non-listed black type races in North America in that it is retroactive rather than prospective, resulting in subpar performances being awarded black type and exceptional performances not being awarded black type, based solely on what happened in the past.

The addition of official ratings to catalog information to complement black type and Group/Grade designation has been suggested.

== See also ==
- List of American and Canadian Graded races
- List of Australian Group races
- List of British Group races (flat)
- List of British Group races (jumps)
- List of French Group races (flat)
- List of French Group races (jumps)
- List of German Group races
- List of Hong Kong horse races
- List of Irish Group races (flat)
- List of Irish Group races (jumps)
- List of Italian Group races
- List of Japanese Group races (flat)
- List of New Zealand Group races
- List of Non-EPC countries' horse races
- List of Scandinavian Group races
- List of South African Group races
- List of South American Group races
- List of Turkish Group races
- List of United Arab Emirates horse races
