= Construction paper =

Colored cardstock paper

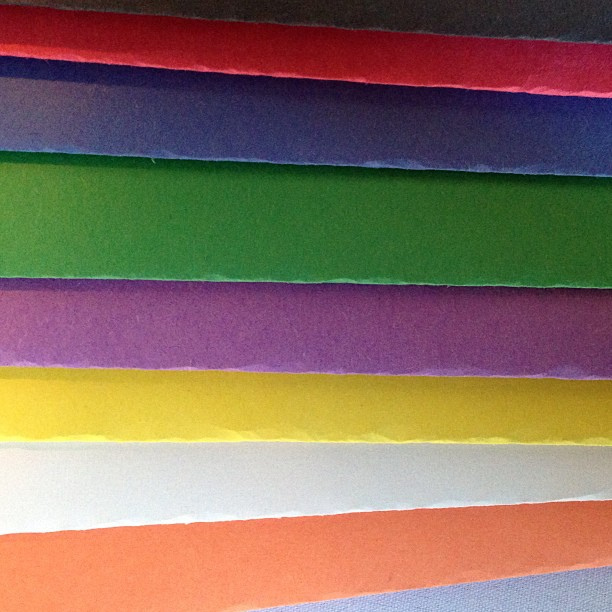
Some construction paper colors

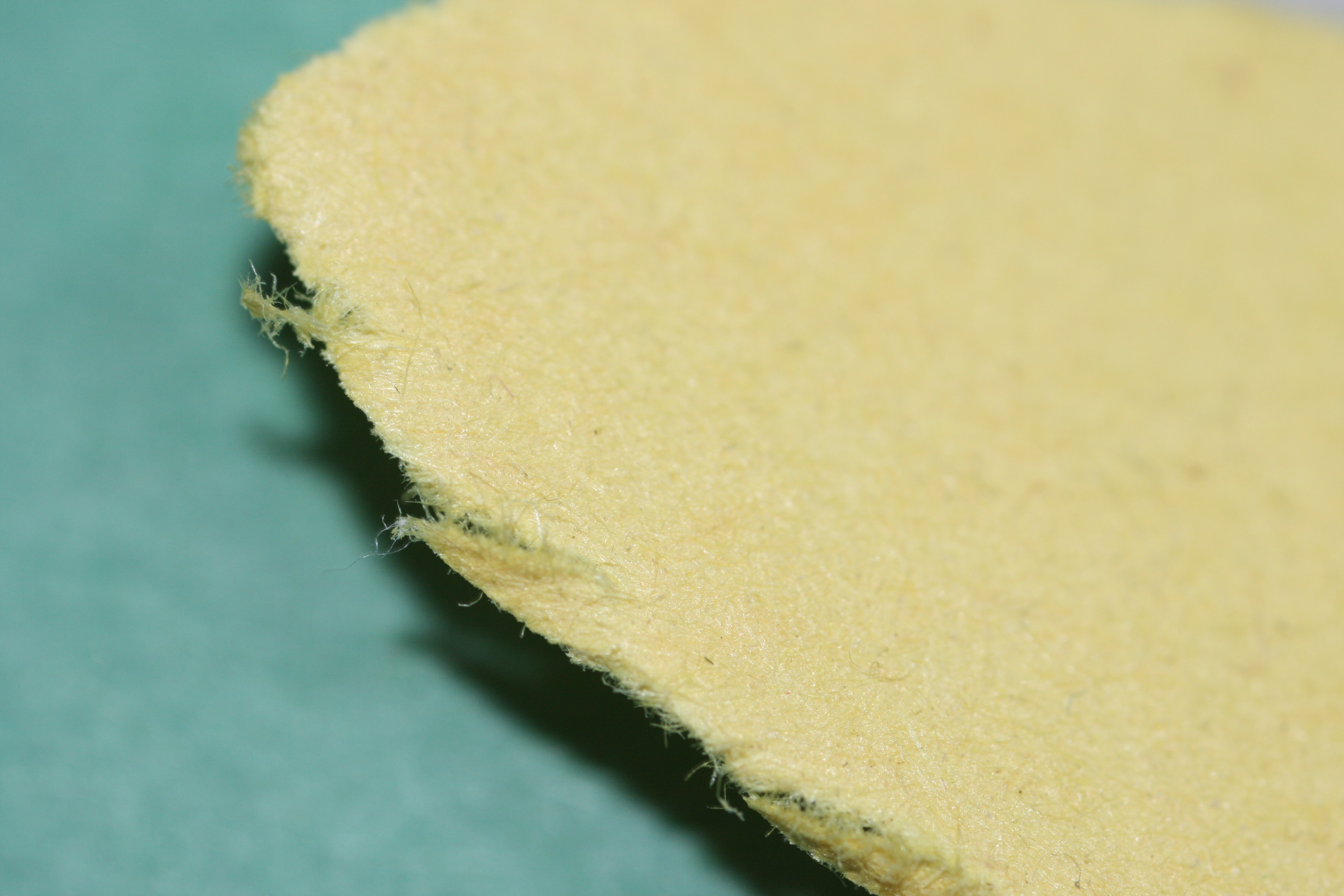
Construction paper texture

Construction paper, also referred to as sugar paper, is colored cardstock paper. The surface is unpolished and has a somewhat rough texture. Due to the source material, mainly wood pulp, small particles are visible on the paper's surface. It is primarily used for projects or crafts.

== Etymology ==
The etymology of sugar paper lies in its use for making bags to contain sugar. It is related to the blue paper used by confectionery bakers in England from the 17th century onwards; for example, in the baking of Regency ratafia cakes (or macaroons).

== History ==
The term construction paper was associated with the material in the early 20th century, although the general process for creating the paper began in the late 19th century when industrialized paper production and synthetic dye technology were combined. Around that time, construction paper was primarily advertised for classroom settings as an effective canvas for supporting multiple drawing media. The process for creating the paper involved a machine oriented process that exposed the paper to dyes while it was still pulp, resulting in a thorough distribution and brilliance of colour. The primary dyes involved in producing construction paper were abundant until Germany, the main producer of aniline for dyes at the time, became involved in World War I and ceased its exports. The shortage marked a period in which construction paper was created using substitute colouring methods.

== Dyeing ==
One of the defining features of construction paper is the radiance of its colours. Before the methodology behind construction paper's colouring was introduced, most paper was coloured by pigments and vegetable oil, which had weaker staining capabilities. Synthetic dyes were later developed, which provided a wider range of colours, stronger dyeing strength, and had lower costs. However, the colours given by synthetic dyes tend to fade over short periods of time, an effect often seen in construction paper, noted by greying colours and brittleness.

== See also ==
- Card stock
- Papermaking
- Bristol board
