= Blue Pages (disambiguation) =

Blue Pages are telephone directory listings of American and Canadian government agencies.

Blue Pages may also refer to:

- Blue Pages, a 1971 roman à clef about being a female screenwriter in Hollywood by Eleanor Perry.
- "The Blue Pages", a 1994 song by Noah Gordon

== See also ==
- Blue book (disambiguation)
- Blue paper, technical specification white paper
- Blue (disambiguation)
- Page (disambiguation)
