= White book =

White book may refer to:

- The German White Book claiming the causes of the 1914 war
- White paper, a type of official government publication
- The C Programming Language, by Brian Kernighan and Dennis Ritchie
- White Book of Rhydderch, manuscript of Welsh folklore
- White Book of Sarnen, a Swiss collection of medieval manuscripts
- White Book – German Occupation of Poland, an Extract of Note Addressed to The Allied and Neutral Powers
- White Book (CD standard), a standard for video compact discs.
- The Little White Book a short collection of creeds by Ben Klassen, founder of the Creativity sect
- The White Book (a.k.a. Civil Procedure), a practitioner textbook on English civil procedure
- White Booklet, alternative spelling list of the Dutch language
- The White Book, a 2016 Korean novel

== See also ==
- White paper (disambiguation)
- Barebook
- Black Book (disambiguation)
- Blue book (disambiguation)
- Green Book (disambiguation)
- Orange Book (disambiguation)
- Pink Book (disambiguation)
- Plum Book
- Yellow Book (disambiguation)
