= Liber Niger =

Liber Niger ("Black Book") may refer to:

- The Liber Niger Alani, a cartulary of the Anglican archdiocese of Dublin by John Alen (1476–1534), Archbishop of Ireland
- The Liber Niger of Holy Trinity or Christ Church cathedral, Dublin, a 13th-century manuscript brought to Dublin by Henry de la Warre, prior of Holy Trinity, Dublin (1301-12/13) and added to subsequently.
- The Liber Niger, the management manual of the English royal households during the Houses of York and Tudor, from the reign of Edward IV through the reign of Henry VIII
- Letter-Book B, also known as the Liber Niger, the second of the Letter-Books of the City of London, recording the business of the City from 1275–1298
- Liber Niger Scaccarii ("Black Book of the Exchequer"), containing reports by county on feudal holdings in England in 1166 (reign of Henry II)
- The Liber Niger of Peterborough Abbey, similar to a cartulary but with miscellaneous contents. It was compiled in the 13th century but contains copies of materials from the 7th century onwards, and is now Society of Antiquaries ms. 60.

== See also ==
- Black Book (disambiguation)
