= Pink Book =

The Pink Book is an informal name for any of several books with pink covers. It may refer to:

- The annual publication by the Office for National Statistics that details the United Kingdom's balance of payments
- Epidemiology and Prevention of Vaccine-Preventable Diseases, a book published by the US Centers for Disease Control and Prevention (14th edition, 2021)
- The member of the Coloured Book protocols family (1980–1992) that defined protocols for transport over Ethernet

== See also ==
- Black Book (disambiguation)
- Blue book (disambiguation)
- Green Book (disambiguation)
- Orange Book (disambiguation)
- Plum Book
- White book (disambiguation)
- Yellow Book (disambiguation)
