= Palestine White Papers =

The Palestine white papers are the British government statements of policy presented to the parliament regarding Mandatory Palestine, issued between 1922 and 1946.

== White Papers ==
Date	Common name	Full Title	Cmd. #	Purpose	Immigration and land policy	Other policies
June 1922	Churchill White Paper	Correspondence with the Palestine Arab Delegation and the Zionist Organization	Cmd. 1700		Jews' right to immigrate but must not exceed "the economic capacity of the country at the time to absorb new arrivals."	Jewish national home: "a center in which the Jewish people as a whole may take, on grounds of religion and race, an interest and a pride."
November 1928		Statement of Policy ... (Wailing Wall)	Cmd. 3229	No benches or screens could be brought to the Western Wall by Jews, since they had not been allowed during Ottoman rule.		
May 1930	Statement to the Permanent Mandates Commission	Palestine, Statement with regard to British Policy	Cmd. 3582		government must issue clear statements safeguarding Arab rights and regulating Jewish immigration and land purchase	welcomed an investigation by an international commission of the conflicting claims to the Western Wall
October 1930	Passfield White Paper	Statement of Policy by His Majesty's Government in the United Kingdom Presented by the Secretary of State for the Colonies to Parliament by Command of His Majesty. (Passfield)	Cmd. 3692	Obligations "of equal weight" to both communities	Stricter controls to be placed on Jewish immigration and land purchase	Renew the effort to establish the legislative council proposed in 1922
July 1937	White Paper on Partition	Statement of Policy on the Peel Commission report	Cmd. 5513	Recommended partition		
December 1937		Statement of Policy, appointment of the Woodhead Commission	Cmd. 5634			
November 1938		Statement of Policy on the Woodhead Commission's report	Cmd. 5893			
May 1939	MacDonald White Paper	Statement of Policy presented by the Secretary of State for the Colonies ... (MacDonald)	Cmd. 6019	No partition, with creation of self-governing institutions and shared authority over 10 years	Limited Jewish immigration to 75,000 over five years; subsequent immigration would require Arab approval. Purchase of land would be limited in some parts of Palestine and forbidden in others	

== Other command papers ==
- Cmd 1499: An Interim Report on the Civil Administration of Palestine During the Period Ist July, 1920–30 June 1921. London: HMSO, 1921.
- Cmd 1540: Palestine Disturbances of May, 1921: Reports of the Commissioners of Inquiry ... (Haycraft) London: HMSO, 1921.
- Cmd 1785: Mandate for Palestine. London: HMSO, July 1922.
- Cmd 1889: Papers relating to the elections for the Palestine Legislative Council. London: HMSO, 1923.
- Cmd 3530: Report of the Commission (Palestine Disturbances of August 1929; Shaw). London: HMSO, 1930.
- Cmd 3683-3687: Report on Immigration, Land Settlement and Development by Sir John Hope Simpson London: HMSO, 1930.
- Cmd 5479: Report of the Palestine Royal Commission ... (Peel) London: HMSO, 1937.
- Cmd 5854: Report of the Palestine Partition Commission (Woodhead) London: HMSO, 1938.

== See also ==
- White paper (disambiguation)
