= ICSC =

ICSC can refer to:

- International Cataloguing Standards Committee, in thoroughbred horse racing
- International Chemical Safety Cards, promoting the safe use of chemicals in the workplace
- International Civil Service Commission, administering the United Nations common system
- International Climate Science Coalition, a climate change denialist group
- International Council of Shopping Centers, the global trade association for shopping centers
- Islamia College of Science and Commerce, Srinagar, located in Jammu and Kashmir state, India
- International Committee of Silent Chess, renamed International Chess Committee of the Deaf (ICCD) in 2012
