= Orange Book =

Orange Book may refer to:

- Trusted Computer System Evaluation Criteria, a computer security standard
- We Can Conquer Unemployment, 1929 manifesto by David Lloyd George and the Liberal Party
- The Orange Book: Reclaiming Liberalism, by members of the British Liberal Democrat party
- Approved Drug Products with Therapeutic Equivalence Evaluations, published by the FDA's Center for Drug Evaluation and Research
- The IUPAC Compendium of Analytical Nomenclature informally known as the Orange Book
- The compact disc standard in the Rainbow Books series which specifies the standards for CD-R and CD-RW media
- Orange-Book-Standard, issued in 2009 by the German Federal Court of Justice on the interaction between patent law and standards
- Orange Book, a local area networking protocol based on the Cambridge Ring and one of the UK Coloured Book protocols
- Handbook of Directives and Permitted Conventions for the English Bridge Union
- A book about OpenGL Shading Language
- The Orange Book, volume 2 (1970) of the British series Carols for Choirs

== See also ==
- The Orange Box
- Black Book (disambiguation)
- Blue book (disambiguation)
- Green Book (disambiguation)
- Pink Book (disambiguation)
- Plum Book
- White book (disambiguation)
- Yellow Book (disambiguation)
