= Option (aircraft purchasing) =

Allowance for airlines to buy additional vehicles

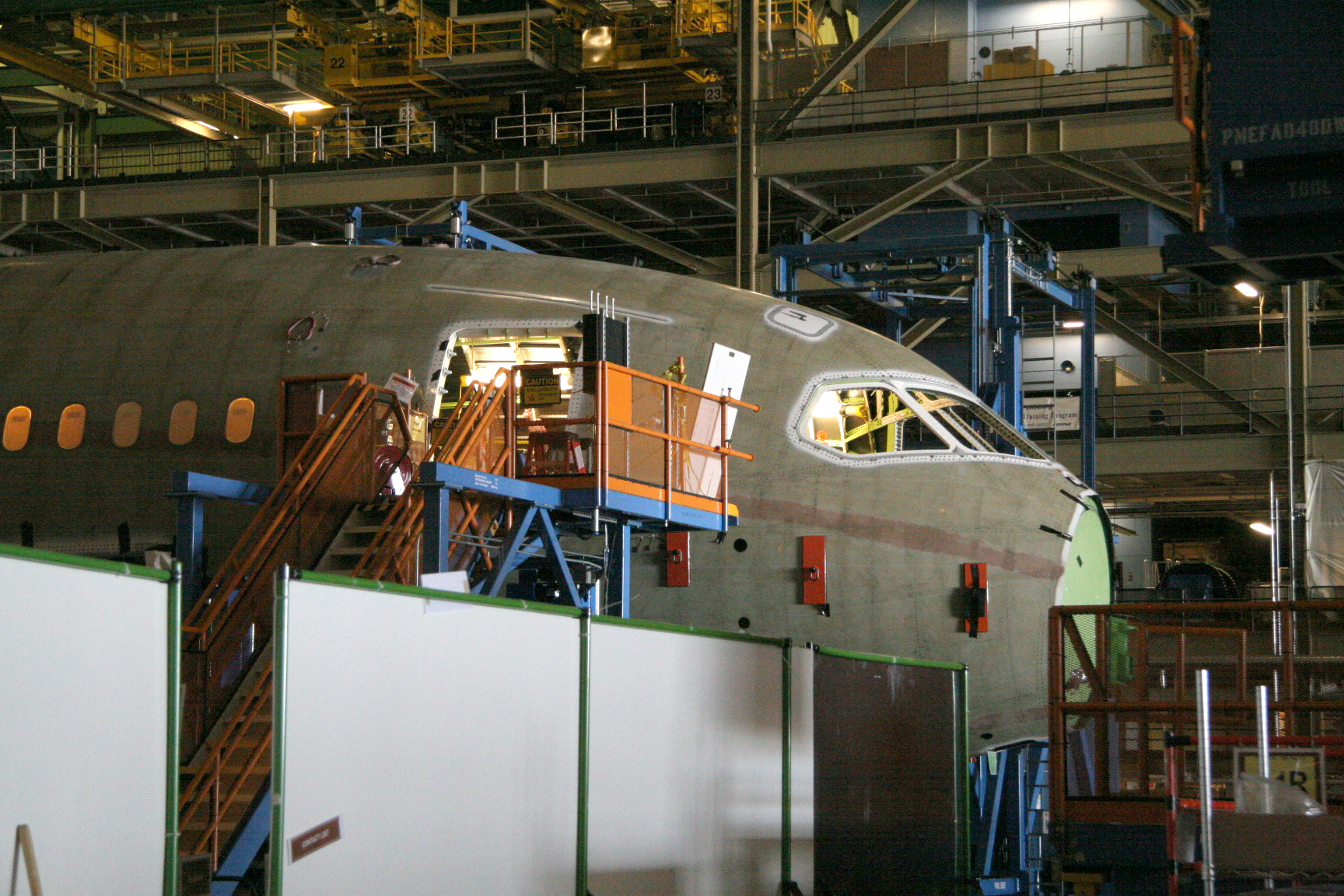
Aircraft assembly at Boeing

An option, when purchasing aircraft, allows an airline to purchase additional aircraft in the future, at an agreed price and date.

When placing orders for new aircraft, airlines commonly obtain options from the aircraft manufacturer. These options allow the airline to delay the purchase of additional aircraft until market conditions become clearer and the purchase can be justified. It reserves the airline a place in the manufacturing queue, for a guaranteed delivery slot.

When the airline exercises its options, it can place its order without having to join the end of the queue, which otherwise may delay the delivery of the aircraft for years. If future conditions do not justify expansion of the airline's fleet, the airline is not obliged to purchase the aircraft. An example, is an airline purchasing 30 planes up-front and having options for an additional 20 for later delivery.

Depending on economic conditions, manufacturers often sell aircraft purchasing options below either the real or Aircraft Bluebook value of the aircraft.

== Rolling options ==
Rolling options differ from ordinary aircraft purchase options, in that the delivery slot is assigned at a later date, when the option is exercised or expires.
