= LBB =

LBB may stand for:

- Lactobacillus delbrueckii subsp. bulgaricus, a bacterium used in the production of yogurt
- Ladyzhenskaya–Babuška–Brezzi condition, in mathematics
- Laura Bell Bundy (born 1981), an actress and singer
- Little Baby Bum, a British CGI children's animated web series
- Little brown bird, name given to an unidentified species
- Little Black Book (disambiguation)
- Lubbock Preston Smith International Airport, by IATA code
- Lebak Bulus MRT station, a rapid transit station in Jakarta, Indonesia
