= PCHR =

PCHR may refer to:

- Palestinian Centre for Human Rights, an independent human rights organization
- Personal Child Health Record, in the United Kingdom
- Port Colborne Harbour Railway, an Ontario shortline railway
