= Yellow Book =

Yellow Book, Yellowbook or The Yellow Book may refer to:

== Arts and entertainment ==
- The Yellow Book (1894–1897), a leading UK literary journal
- Libro giallo (lit. yellow book) italian term for crime fiction

== Government regulations ==
- General Location of National System of Interstate Highways, nicknamed "Yellow Book", relating to the US Interstate Highway System
- Government Auditing Standards (nicknamed the Yellow Book), standards relating to audits of governments in the United States
- Yellow Book (GPFAA) or The Government Profit Formula and its Associated Arrangements, rules governing British Ministry of Defence no-bid contracts prior to 2014
- Yellow Book (Financial Conduct Authority), term for the UK Financial Conduct Authority's Listing Rules

== Science and technology ==
=== Computing ===
- Yellow Book (computer security) or Guidance for Applying TCSEC in Specific Environments, part of the "Rainbow Series" of computer security standards
- Yellow Book (CD format specification), part of the "Rainbow Books" series that describes the CD-ROM specification
- Yellow Book Transport Service (YBTS), a transport-layer network protocol, part of the UK Coloured Book protocols

=== Other uses in science and technology ===
- Yellow Book (ITU), the set of telecommunications recommendations, issued by the International Telecommunication Union Standardisation Sector in 1980

== Other uses ==
- Yellow pages, telephone directories, generically published in yellow colored books, also called yellow books
  - Yellowbook Inc., now known as Hibu, a digital listings company and former publisher of "Yellow Pages" telephone directories in the US
- Yellow Book (National Garden Scheme), former name of a guide published by the National Gardens Scheme in parts of the UK
- Yellow Book (Scotland's Gardens), the guide published as part of the "Scotland's Gardens" project
- The Yellow Book (Dorje Shugden), also known as The Oral Transmission of the Intelligent Father, a 1975 text asserting the pre-eminence of the Gelug school over other denominations of Buddhism
- Britain's Industrial Future, a 1928 report of the British Liberal Party, commonly known as the Yellow Book
- The Yellow Book (Sidewalk Labs), a book published by Sidewalk Labs describes a speculative city designed and run by them
- Yellow Book of France, a World War I propaganda publication
- Kitab kuning (lit. 'the yellow book'), Indonesian term for traditional Islamic texts

== See also ==
- Yellow Pages (disambiguation)
- Black Book (disambiguation)
- Blue book (disambiguation)
- Green Book (disambiguation)
- Orange Book (disambiguation)
- Pink Book (disambiguation)
- Plum Book
- White book (disambiguation)
- Yellow-back
