= James Howe (painter) =

Scottish animal and portrait painter (1780–1836)

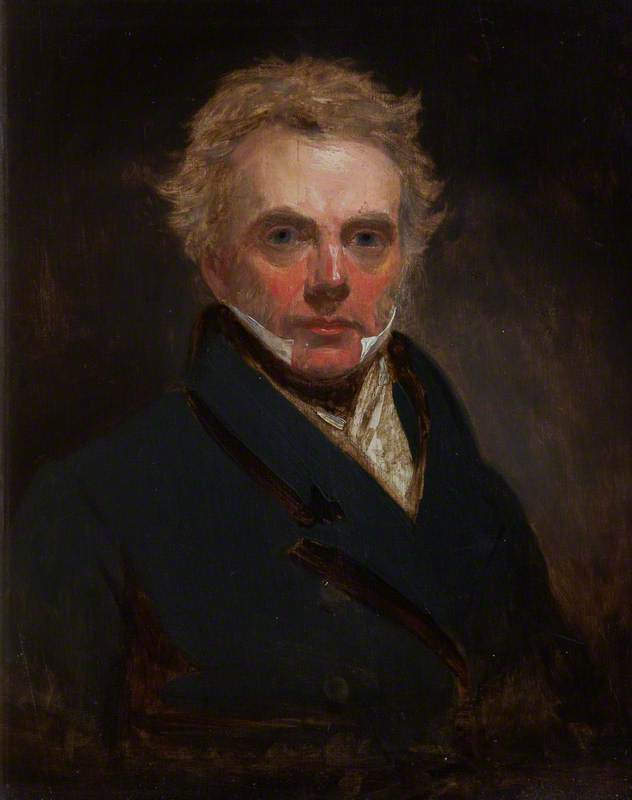
Portrait by Thomas Sword Good (c. 1820s)

James Howe (1780–1836) was a Scottish animal and portrait painter.

== Life ==
James Howe was born on 30 August 1780 at Skirling in Peeblesshire, where his father, William Howe, was minister from 1765 till his death on 10 December 1796. After attending the parish school Howe was apprenticed to a housepainter at Edinburgh, but employed his time in painting panoramic exhibitions, devoting himself especially to animals. Howe obtained a great reputation for his skill in drawing horses and cattle and was employed in drawing portraits of well-known animals for a series of illustrations of British domestic animals, published by the Highland Society of Scotland to stimulate breeding. He was also commissioned by Sir John Sinclair to draw examples of various breeds of cattle. A set of fourteen engravings of horses from drawings by Howe were published and, for the most part, engraved by W. H. Lizars, at Edinburgh in 1824, and a series of forty-five similar engravings of horses and cattle was published in 1832.

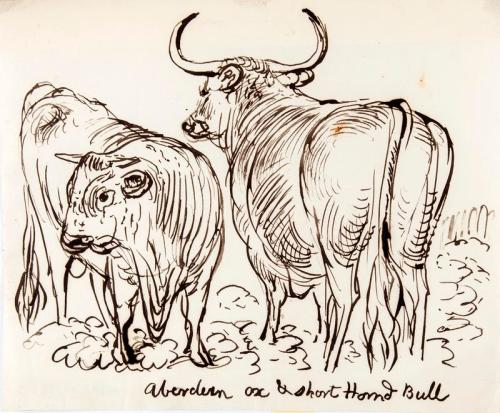
Aberdeen Ox and Shorthorn Bull (c. 1825–36)

Howe came once to London to paint the horses of the royal stud, but resided principally at Edinburgh, where he was a frequent exhibitor at the Edinburgh exhibitions, Royal Institution, and Royal Scottish Academy from 1808 to the time of his death. In 1815 he visited the field of Waterloo, and painted a picture of the battle, which he exhibited at the Royal Academy in London in 1816.

Howe died at Edinburgh on 11 July 1836.
