= Cartae Baronum =

The Cartae Baronum ("Charters of the Barons") was a survey commissioned by the English Treasury in 1166. It required each of the king's tenants-in-chief, not just those who held per baroniam, to declare how many knights he had enfeoffed and how many were super dominium, with the names of all. It appears that the survey was designed to identify baronies from which a greater servitium debitum could in future be obtained by the king.

An example is given from the return of Lambert of Etocquigny:

To his reverend lord, Henry, king of the English, Lambert of Etocquigny, greeting. Know that I hold from you by your favour 16 carucates of land and 2 bovates [about 2,000 acres] by the service of 10 knights. In these 16 carucates of land I have 5 knights enfeoffed by the old enfeoffment:

- Richard de Haia holds 1 knight's fee; and he withheld the service which he owes to you and to me from the day of your coronation up to now, except that he paid me 2 marks. [about 500 grams of silver]
- Odo de Cranesbi holds 1 knight's fee.
- Thomas, son of William, holds 1 knight's fee.
- Roger de Millers holds 2 knight's fees.

And from my demesne I provide the balance of the service I owe you, to wit, that of 5 knights. And from that demesne I have given Robert de Portemort 3/4 of 1 knight's fee. Therefore I pray you that you will send me your judgement concerning Richard de Haia who holds back the service of his fee, because I cannot obtain that service except by your order. This is the total service in the aforesaid 16 carucates of land. Farewell.

The original Cartae Baronum were copied into the Black Book of the Exchequer by Alexander of Swerford during the reign of John. He later also copied them in to the Red Book of the Exchequer. The Exchequer books contain 245 charters. Two further charters are known from originals.

== See also ==
- Catalogus Baronum

== Sources ==
- Douglas, David C. & Greenaway, George W., (eds.), English Historical Documents 1042–1189, London, 1959. Part IV, Land & People, C, Anglo-Norman Feudalism, pp. 895–944
- Stacy, Neil (ed.), Cartae Baronum, Publications of the Pipe Roll Society, new ser., 62. Woodbridge: The Boydell Press, 2019.
