= Brown Book =

Brown Book may refer to:

- Brown Book (album), a 1987 album by Death In June
- Brown Book (document), created by the government in Manitoba, Canada, containing suggested fines for various offences
- The Brown Book (Wittgenstein) (1934–1935), a set of lecture notes by Ludwig Wittgenstein
- The Brown Book of the Reichstag Fire and Hitler Terror, a 1933 book by Otto Katz
- Brown Book - War and Nazi Criminals in West Germany, or Braunbuch, a 1965 book by Albert Norden

== See also ==
- Little, Brown Book Group
