= Yellow Pages (disambiguation) =

A yellow pages is a telephone directory restricted to business entries.

Yellow Pages may also refer to:

== Directories ==
- Network Information Service
- Yellow Pages (UDDI)
- Electronic Yellow Pages
- Yellow Pages Group, a Canadian directory publisher

== Other uses ==
- Mr Yellow Pages, Loren M. Berry

== See also ==
- Yellow Book (disambiguation)
- The Yellow Payges, 1960s rock band
- Yellow Pages Endeavour, sailboat
- Yellow (disambiguation)
- Page (disambiguation)
