= WHO Blue Books =

Series of books that classify tumours

- Cover of the WHO blue book on Digestive System Tumours, 5th edition
- Digestive System Tumours Breast tumours Soft tissue and bone tumours Female genital tumours Thoracic tumours
- Edited by: WHO Classification of Tumours Group (World Health Organization)
- Country: France
- Discipline: Tumours
- Publisher: International Agency for Research on Cancer
- Preceded by: International Histological Classification of Tumors

The WHO Classification of Tumours, more commonly known as the WHO Blue Books, is a series of books that classify tumours. They are compiled by expert consensus and published by the World Health Organization's (WHO) International Agency for Research on Cancer (IARC). They appear in print and online in a series of 15 books, each of which focuses on a major tumour group and defines the cause, mechanism, signs and symptoms, basic structure, diagnosis, epidemiology and outcomes of up to 300 types of tumours.

The project was started by the WHO in 1956 and the first series of books was published between 1967 and 1981, as the International Histological Classification of Tumors series. A fifth series was released in 2019. Terms included in the books appear in the international classification of diseases for tumours.

The classifications are regularly updated by an editorial board composed mostly of practicing pathologists. The method of classifying tumours in the Blue Books was discussed in an accompanying article in the International Journal of Cancer in June 2020, titled "WHO Classification of Tumours: How should tumors be classified? Expert consensus, systematic reviews or both?"

== The series ==
The WHO Classification of Tumours series, more commonly known as the WHO Blue Books, published by the WHO's IARC, is a series of books that classify tumours according to principally its location and histopathology. They are compiled by expert consensus, teams of specialists at the International Agency for Research on Cancer, who summarize information from literature. Terms included in the books appear in the international classification of diseases for tumours.

They are published as a series of 15 books, in addition to a website, which provide information on cancer diagnosis, research, treatment and outcomes, particularly for pathologists and cancer researchers. Each book defines the cause, mechanism, signs and symptoms, basic structure, diagnosis, epidemiology and outcomes of up to 300 types of tumours. Between 150 - 200 authors, including radiologists, surgeons, physicians and epidemiologists, contribute to each book.

== Editorial board ==
The WHO Classification of Tumors Group is headed by Ian Cree. The classifications are updated regularly by an editorial board composed mostly of practicing pathologists, who review and agree on definitions and criteria for each tumor.

The editorial board consists of standing members and expert members. Experts are listed in each of the tumour specialties; digestive system tumours, breast tumours, soft tissue and bone tumours, female genital tumours, thoracic tumours. central nervous system tumours, paediatric tumours, urinary and male genital tumours, head and neck tumours, and endocrine and neuroendocrine tumours.

== History ==
The WHO started the project on the blue books in 1956.

=== First and second series (1967-2000) ===
Leslie Sobin edited the first edition, published from 1967 to 1981, as the International Histological Classification of Tumors series. Sobin edited a second edition of 25 volumes, published by Springer between 1982 and 2002.

In 1993 the WHO approved a concise classification of tumours affecting the central nervous system. It was later revised in 2007 and then in 2016.

=== Third series (2000) ===
The third edition of 10 volumes, was published in a new style as a series of World Health Organization Classification of Tumors from 2000 to 2005, and edited by Sobin and Paul Kleihues.

=== Fourth series (2006) ===
In 2006, the fourth edition was initiated and guided by series editors Fred Bosman, Elaine S. Jaffe, Sunil R. Lakhani, and Hiroko Ohgaki. It was completed in 2018 and included 12 volumes plus revised versions of central nervous system tumours and blood cancers.

The fourth edition of the WHO Classification of Digestive System Tumors was published in 2010. A fourth edition describing breast tumours was published in 2012, Tumours of the Central Nervous System in 2017, and the WHO Classification of Skin Tumors in 2018. In it, the classification of melanoma is based on its mechanism and its association with sun-exposed skin.

- WHO classification of Tumours of the Central Nervous System. Vol. 1 (4th ed.). Lyon (France): International Agency for Research on Cancer. 2016. ISBN 978-92-832-4492-9.
- WHO Classification of Tumours of Endocrine Organs. Vol. 10 (4 ed.). Lyon (France): International Agency for Research on Cancer. 2017. ISBN 978-92-832-4493-6.
- WHO Classification of Skin Tumours. Vol. 11 (4th ed.). Lyon (France): International Agency for Research on Cancer. 2018. ISBN 978-92-832-2440-2.

=== Fifth series (2019) ===
A fifth series was released in 2019, in a lighter blue and with a bold "5" on the book spine, to make it distinct from older outdated editions that might inadvertently be referred to. The text appears in two columns; previously there were three. It is the first in the series of the WHO blue books to appear online in its complete form, and includes a few books from the fourth series with the aim of updating books as they develop. Its website uses images and hyperlinks.

The first volume to be produced was on the classification of Digestive System Tumours. Seven years after the fourth edition, a fifth edition on Soft Tissue and Bone Tumours was published in May 2020. The fifth Female Genital Tumours was published in September 2020. The fifth edition of Thoracic Tumours was discussed at the 2020 World Conference on Lung Cancer in Toronto. It includes additional chapters "Diagnostic Molecular Pathology" and "Essential or Desirable Diagnostic Criteria", and some new lung cancer types.

- Digestive System Tumours. Vol. 1 (5th ed.). Lyon (France): International Agency for Research on Cancer. 2019. ISBN 978-92-832-4499-8.
- Breast Tumours. Vol. 2 (5th ed.). Lyon (France): International Agency for Research on Cancer. 2019. ISBN 978-92-832-4500-1.
- Soft Tissue and Bone Tumours. Vol. 3 (5th ed.). Lyon (France): International Agency for Research on Cancer. 2020. ISBN 978-92-832-4502-5.
- Female Genital Tumours. Vol. 4 (5th ed.). Lyon (France): International Agency for Research on Cancer. 2020. ISBN 978-92-832-4504-9.
- Thoracic Tumours. Vol. 5 (5th ed.). Lyon (France): International Agency for Research on Cancer. 2021. ISBN 978-92-832-4506-3.
- Central Nervous System Tumours. Vol. 6 (5th ed.). Lyon (France): International Agency for Research on Cancer. 2021. ISBN 978-92-832-4508-7.
- Paediatric Tumours. Vol. 7 (5th ed.). Lyon (France): International Agency for Research on Cancer. 2023. ISBN 978-92-832-4510-0.
- Urinary and Male Genital Tumours. Vol. 8 (5th ed.). Lyon (France): International Agency for Research on Cancer. 2022. ISBN 978-92-832-4512-4.
- Head and Neck Tumours. Vol. 9 (5th ed.). Lyon (France): International Agency for Research on Cancer. 2024. ISBN 978-92-832-4514-8.

== Consensus based versus evidence based approach ==
The method of classifying tumours in the Blue Books was discussed in an accompanying article in the International Journal of Cancer in June 2020, titled "WHO Classification of Tumours: How should tumors be classified? Expert consensus, systematic reviews or both?" In it, they noted that heavy reliance on expert consensus relative to structured and controlled systematic reviews may result in bias, giving undue weight to particular literature or missing relevant studies. In the first volume of the fifth series, 200 tumours or topics were marked as clinically irrelevant, and up to 130 were reported as "unknown", with no further explanation of whether a detailed literature search was conducted. Interpersonal and cultural factors, dominating characters, and the varying representations in each expert panel, influence decisions. During updating, carrying forward previously incorrectly referenced material could also be a potential problem.

The authors noted that biases are reduced somewhat by having an editorial board to oversee evidence and make decisions. They questioned whether these problems could also be reduced by adding evidence‐based practices to the editorial process, but noted that imposing this might not be appropriate, and that some feel that "clinical judgment based on experience" has an importance that may not be emphasised from randomized controlled trials. In conclusion, they proposed four "non‐negotiables" when carrying out literature reviews that affect important decisions for the WHO Blue Book series: transparency, searching rigor, double checking, risk of bias assessment.

== See also ==
- Blue book (disambiguation)
