= Little Black Book =

Little Black Book may refer to:

- An address book, particularly one containing the names of past or potential romantic or sexual partners
- Black Book of the Exchequer, also called the Little Black Book
- Little Black Book, an annual feature of the Tatler, a British magazine
- Little Black Book, Elrey Borge Jeppesen's book in which he wrote notes to help early aviators find their way
- Little Black Book (film), a 2004 comedy film
- "Little Black Book" (song), by Belinda Carlisle
- "Little Black Book", a 1962 song by Jimmy Dean
- "The Little Black Book: Part 1" and "Part 2", a 1968 two-part episode of Get Smart

== See also ==
- Black Book (disambiguation)
