= Aircraft bluebook =

An aircraft bluebook is a bluebook (value guide) for used aircraft. There are four of these in common use within the aviation industry; Aircraft Bluebook Price Digest, Aircraft Value Reference (VREF), and Airliner Price Guide are paid-subscription publications. International Bluebook is an online free service.

== Overview ==
None of the aviation industry bluebooks may be expected to give the simple calculation accuracy typical of the US automotive industry books such as Automobile Blue Book, or Kelley Blue Book. A number of issues contribute to the difficulty in presenting a clear figure for a make/model/year, such as lack of central reporting of aircraft sales for either tax or license requirements, the complexity of individual aircraft value calculations, the timing of sales (long timeframes from offer to closing during which time the market can go up or down substantially), multiple synchronous closings for jet aircraft in particular, international currency sales, and non-disclosure-of-price terms included in many transaction documents.

Most banks hire a professional broker/appraiser to allocate a value to an individual aircraft prior to funding. Appraisals usually include an onsite inspection and can be influenced by complex variables such as the year (manufactured year, delivery year, serial number sequence); time on airframe and engines (or until upcoming major inspection and maintenance events); damage (including where/how repaired); logbook and upgrades history; previous owners (number, type usage, and geographic location); maintenance programs (specially approved maintenance schedules and/or power by the hour engine insurance type plans); avionics; options; current mechanical, interior and exterior condition etc.

== Aircraft Bluebook Price Digest ==
The Aircraft Bluebook Price Digest is a quarterly print publication by Informa (also available on CD-ROM) that was established in the 1950s. It identifies and prices more than 3,000 used general aviation aircraft and helicopter make and model-years available in the United States. Prices reflect historical data and cannot, therefore, take into account current operating conditions, such as fuel prices, which have a big effect on commercial aircraft values. Coverage also includes avionics, airworthiness, common conversions and overhaul usage limits.

=== Bluebook scale ===
The Bluebook scale is an index published by the Price Digest that tabulates the condition of an aircraft. The scale is widely used in the aviation industry. The scale ranges from 10 for a new aircraft to 1 for an aircraft not fit for flight.

== Windsock ==
Windsock, established in 2025, is an online aircraft valuation service that uses machine learning to estimate aircraft values. Unlike traditional bluebook publications that rely on manually compiled historical transaction data and periodic expert updates, it employs generalized predictive modeling. The service addresses limitations inherent to traditional methods, including publication lag, limited sample sizes, and the difficulty of accounting for the numerous variables that affect individual aircraft value.

== Aircraft Value Reference ==
Aircraft Value Reference (VREF), established in 1991, is published twice a year by the Aircraft Value Analysis Company. It is used by both aircraft brokers and a number of financial institutions to estimate the future value of aircraft.

== Airliner Price Guide ==
The Airliner Price Guide, established in 1985, is published by ACI Aviation Consulting. It provides prices for new and used commercial aircraft and other data such as engine values. The print version of the guide is issued twice a year. An online service is updated in real time.

== International Bluebook ==
The International Bluebook is a free online service which offers general bluebook figures for jet aircraft models and conditions. The site does not provide calculations for individual aircraft, but these may be obtained via dealer’s sites or on jet aircraft multiple listing service (MLS) sites which use the service.

== Bibliography ==
- Vasigh, B.; Taleghani, R.; Jenkins, D. (2012). Aircraft Finance: Strategies for Managing Capital Costs in a Turbulent Industry. J Ross Press Series. J. Ross Pub. ISBN 978-1-60427-071-6.
