= Colonial Annual Reports =

Series of reports by HM Stationery Office

The Colonial Annual Reports (or Blue Books) were a series of reports produced by HM Stationery Office for consumption by the Colonial Office and the Secretary of State for the Colonies. They were produced annually for each colony, territory and protectorate in the British Empire starting in 1887. The reports were produced every two years from 1951 until they ceased in 1975.

== Gallery ==
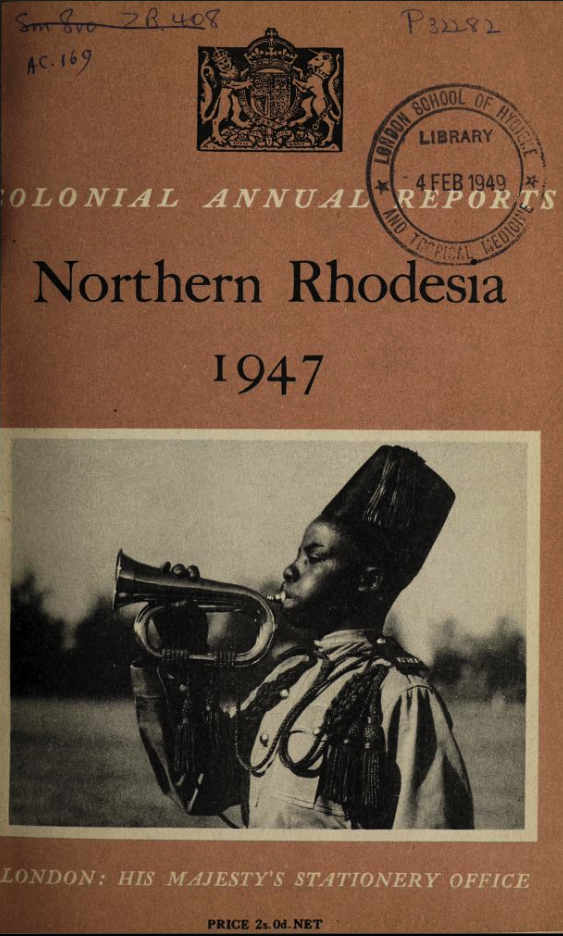

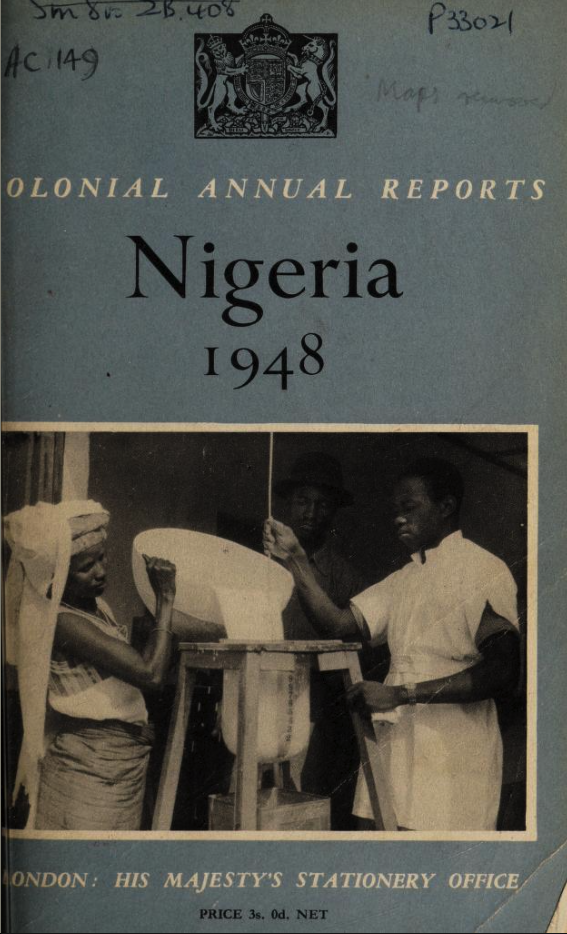

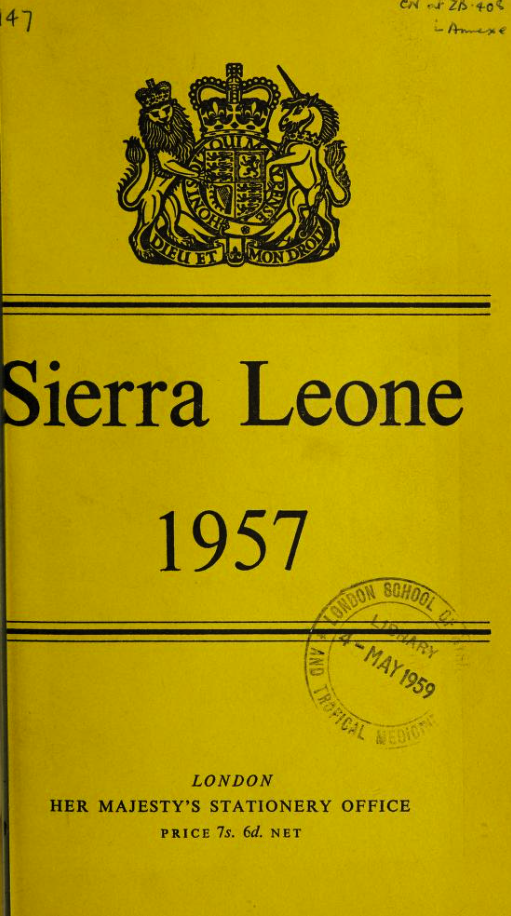

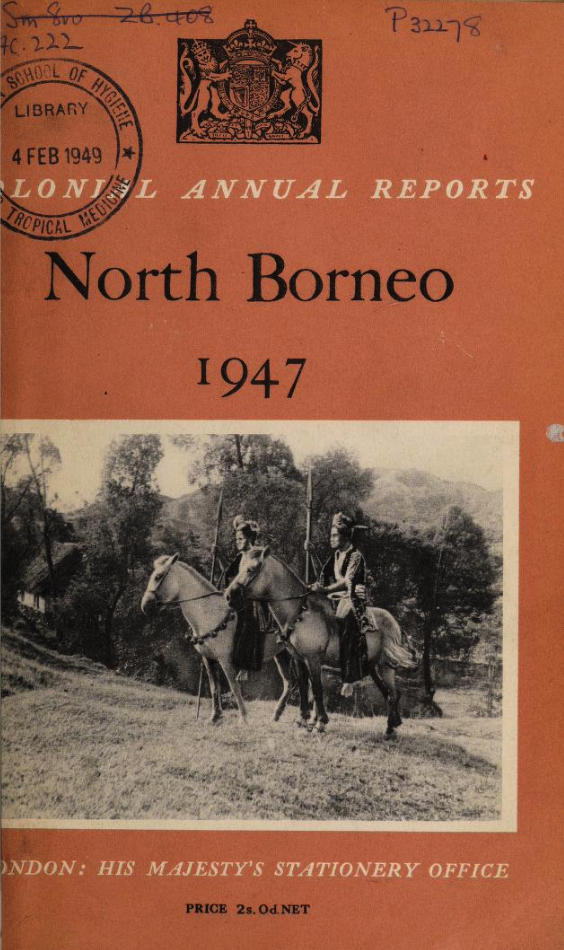

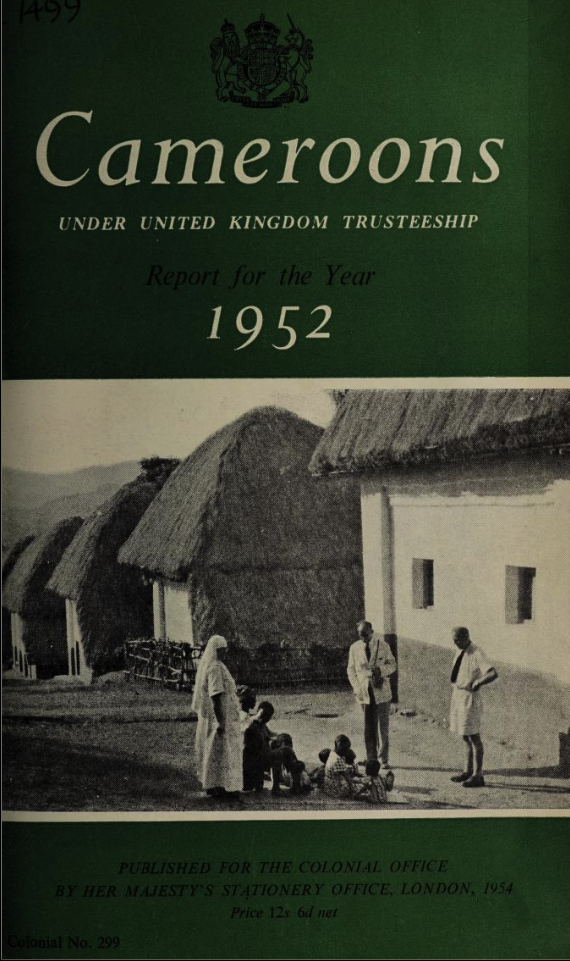

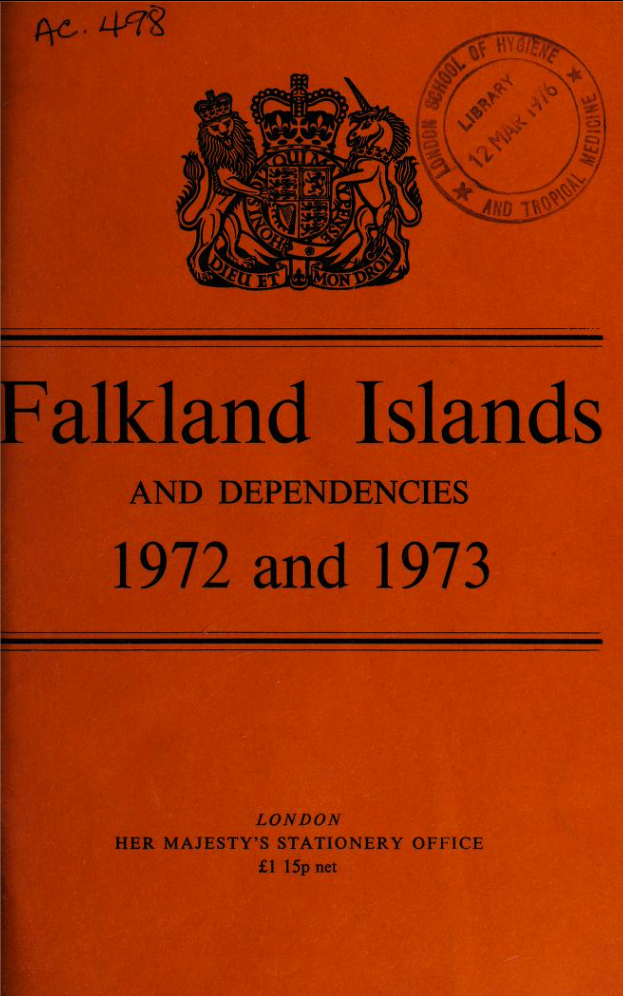
