= Little Red Book (disambiguation) =

The Little Red Book (Quotations from Chairman Mao Tse-tung) is a book of quotations widely distributed during China's Cultural Revolution.

Little Red Book may also refer to:

- The Little Red Book (Alcoholics Anonymous), a study guide
- "Little Red Book" (The Mentalist), a 2011 television episode
- RedNote, a Chinese social media and e-commerce platform created in 2013

== See also ==
- "My Little Red Book", song by Burt Bacharach and Hal David
- Little Red Songbook, a 1909 song book published by the Industrial Workers of the World
- The Little Red Schoolbook, published in Denmark in 1969
