= Red Books of Humphry Repton =

The Red Books were books created by the landscape designer Humphry Repton to illustrate his designs for his clients.

The books were a way for Repton to describe his landscape design plans for their property. More than one hundred of the estimated four hundred Red Books created by Repton are still extant. The books acquired their name from their distinctive binding in red Morocco leather.

The Morgan Library & Museum in New York City holds the Red Books for Ferney Hall in Shropshire, commissioned by Samuel Phipps in 1789, and Hatchlands Park in Surrey, commissioned by William Brightwell Sumner in 1800.

The Red Books for Shrublands Hall in Suffolk from 1788 and Brondesbury Park in Middlesex in 1790, are in the collection of Dumbarton Oaks in Georgetown (Washington, D.C.).
