= Blue Book (racing) =

The Blue Book is a publication of The Jockey Club (U.S.) which lists the highest standard of thoroughbred horseraces in the world, which are collectively known as Group races. Its publication is overseen and approved by the International Cataloguing Standards Committee (ICSC) of the Society of International Thoroughbred Auctioneers (SITA). The ICSC plays a central role as regulator of international stakes quality, and provides a process for requests to have races sanctioned as Group races.
