= White paper (disambiguation) =

A white paper is an authoritative report or guide that helps solve a problem, or a form of marketing communication.

White paper may also refer to:

- White Paper (film), a 2010 Iranian animated film
- Accidental Death and Disability: The Neglected Disease of Modern Society or The White Paper, a report by the National Academy of Sciences on emergency medical services
- The White Paper (novel), a 1928 French novel by Jean Cocteau
- Palestine white paper, one of six policy papers issued by the British government regarding the situation in Palestine
- 1969 White Paper, a policy paper issue by the Canadian government attempting to abolish the Indian Act
- White Paper on El Salvador, a work of propaganda issued by the US State Department in 1981 to justify intervention in El Salvador and Nicaragua

== See also ==
- Blank piece of paper
- White book (disambiguation)
