= Black Book (National Auto Research) =

United States vehicle valuation guides

The Black Book family of vehicle appraisal guides in the United States, providing vehicle pricing data, is published by National Auto Research, a division of Hearst Communications. New and used car dealers, lenders, manufacturers, fleet remarketers, and government agencies have used Black Book since 1955.

Black Book provides values for both new and used vehicles, including cars, light trucks, and collectible vehicles produced since 1946, motorcycles, ATVs, snowmobiles, personal watercraft, and heavy duty commercial trucks and trailers. Other products include vehicle identification number (VIN) decoding software, projected residual values, inventory management tools, and lead generation applications.

Black Book data is published daily in multiple electronic formats including data feeds, internet-based applications, handheld PDAs, Web-enabled cell phones, Pocket PCs, BlackBerry and Palm devices, smart phones, Micro Browsers, online trade appraisal services, and in a variety of other custom products. Printed versions are also available.

== Black Book function in the auto industry ==
Black Book is a division of Hearst Business Media Corporation. The magazine is circulation controlled, restricted to dealers and financing sources. Black Book is issued weekly, reflecting the latest prices direct from actual or online automobile dealers. National Auto Research Inc, provides vehicle pricing. In select formats, Black Book vehicle appraisal guides are published daily, weekly, and monthly in various electronic formats, including data feeds, internet-based applications, hand held PDAs, smart phones and online appraisal services.

== Black Book methodology ==
Black Book collects data from wholesale auctions it attends in person or online, applies adjustments and compares them against dealer advertised prices. Access is restricted because it requires subscriptions, but public access to its price search features are accessible through third party sites such as Newcars.com. Assessing car value is dependent on several factors including make, model, year, condition, accessories and mileage of the vehicle. Black Book is the official valuation service for Cars.com, a third-party internet shopping site.
