= Brown Book (document) =

The Brown Book is a document created by the Manitoba government containing suggested fines for various offences against the Acts of the government, including the Highway Traffic Act.

For example, the Brown Book lists the following suggested fines:

- for speeding
  - 10 km/h over the limit, the fine is 181.50 Canadian dollars
- for failing to display the correct number and type of number plates (licence plates) - i.e. front licence plate - 111.10 Canadian dollars.

The Brown Book is available online as a PDF at .
