= Black Book (novel) =

2006 novel by Laurens Abbink Spaink

- First edition cover
- Author: Laurens Abbink Spaink
- Original title: Zwartboek
- Language: Dutch
- Genre: Thriller, Historical novel
- Publisher: Uitgeverij Podium
- Publication date: 2006
- Publication place: Netherlands
- Media type: Print (Hardback)
- Pages: 224 pages
- ISBN: 90-5759-028-X
- OCLC: 150412755

Black Book (Dutch: Zwartboek) is a Dutch language 2006 thriller novel by Laurens Abbink Spaink. It is the novelization of the Dutch film Black Book (2006). It tells the story of a young Jewish woman, Rachel Stein, and her struggle for survival during and after the Second World War. The book has a photo section, and an afterword by Paul Verhoeven and Gerard Soeteman.

== Plot summary ==
Apart from the prologue and epilogue, the story is a first-person narrative told by Rachel Stein, a young Jewish woman. The novel is set at the end of World War II in the Netherlands.

In September 1944, Rachel is 26 years old, and the Stein family is in hiding from the Nazi authorities. Rachel is living with a Christian family in the Biesbosch, an area of rivers and creeks, separated from the rest of her family. Here she is not allowed outside, but one day she goes sunbathing near the water. Here she meets Rob, a man about her own age, who was on the water sailing. As they enjoy themselves on his boat, a crippled British bomber flies over while dropping its payload so it can climb to escape a pursuing fighter, and one of its bombs hits Rachel's hideout. While she is staying with Rob, they are approached by a Dutch policeman named Van Gein, who offers to help them flee to liberated Belgium. She needs money for her escape, so she visits a lawyer named Smaal in The Hague. During the escape, she is reunited with her parents and brother; but their escape boat—with Rachel, Rob, the rest of the Stein family, and other Jews on board—is ambushed. Rachel hides in the water and gets a good view of the SS officer who was responsible. Everyone except Rachel is killed.

Rachel is smuggled into The Hague disguised as a corpse in a coffin. There, she joins a resistance group led by Gerben Kuipers. She dyes her hair blond and takes the alias Ellis de Vries. While she and the resistance group are trying to smuggle medicine and weapons, they are intercepted by German security forces. All the Germans are killed by resistance group member Hans Akkermanns. Rachel and Hans travel by train with the contraband. In the train Rachel meets a Sicherheitsdienst (SD) officer, Ludwig Müntze, who helps her with her suitcases. Tim, Kuipers' son, and several other members of the resistance group, are later captured by the Germans when their weapons supply truck covered with vegetables crashes. The weapons are exposed when the vegetables are scattered everywhere. The rest of the group plans to have Rachel make contact with Müntze and enlist him in helping them get the prisoners released.

Rachel goes to the SD headquarters to meet Müntze, bringing him Netherlands East Indies stamps for his collection. (He has been collecting stamps for every country he's been stationed in, including Poland.) He invites her to a party. At the party she spots the officer responsible for killing her parents, Günther Franken. He is playing the piano. Rachel feels sick and runs out of the room to throw up in a bathroom. After the party, she sleeps with Müntze, and he tells her how he lost his wife and children in an air raid on Hamburg. Rachel and Müntze fall in love. Rachel is offered a job at the SD and bugs the office with a British device. Franken wants to execute the captured resistance group members, but Müntze refuses to sign the order. Using the hidden mike, Rachel and the other resistance group members learn that Van Gein has been collaborating with the Germans - trapping escaping Jews, murdering them and keeping their money. The resistance decides against saving the Jews from Van Gein, weighing the lives of Jews against imprisoned Dutchmen. Others in the group decide to kidnap the traitor, but their plan fails because the chloroform they use expired in 1941. Van Gein overpowers his kidnappers, who are forced to kill him. "Ellis" returns to Muntze, but finds the German convinced that she is Jewish and a mole for the resistance. Rachel tells Muntze that he is correct but also how she lost her family. He does not arrest her.

With Rachel's information, Müntze accuses Franken of hoarding loot stolen from murdered Jews, inviting General Kauntner to open Franken's safe. While Nazi law allows for the killing Jews, failing to turn over their property is a capital offense. Nevertheless, Franken is cleared when a search of his office safe fails to turn up the stolen loot. Realizing the danger Muntze poses, Franken has him arrested, telling Kauntner of Muntze's negotiating with the resistance, a charge Muntze wearily concedes. Angrily, Kauntner orders Muntze's execution.

Later, a party is held at the SD office to celebrate Hitler's birthday. Rachel persuades the resistance group to free Müntze during an operation to rescue Tim and the other imprisoned members. During the party, Rachel helps the rescue group get into the building, but the mission proves a trap, as heavily armed German soldiers overpower the would-be rescuers, and virtually annihilate them. Franken, apparently tipped off to the resistance operations, has Rachel brought to his office. Knowing of the hidden microphone, he "congratulates" Rachel for her efforts, knowing that the resistance will overhear the conversation and conclude that Rachel betrayed them to the Germans. During the early morning hours, Müntze's driver rescues Rachel and Müntze, and they flee to Rob's sailboat. Rachel and Müntze talk about the war, about who could have informed on them to Franken, and what they would do after the war. On May 5, 1945, they hear Dutch nationalist songs on the radio and learn that the Netherlands has been liberated. Franken escapes Holland by sea, taking his loot with him, but his boat is sabotaged and he is murdered by Hans Akkermans.

During the chaos following liberation, suspected traitors and collaborators are arrested and publicly paraded in disgrace. Rachel and Müntze suspect Smaal as the informant and visit. While they are at his house, Smaal and his wife deny the charges but are murdered. Rachel snatches a little black book of his notes from Smaal's body. Müntze chases Smaal's murderer into the liberation parades but is recognized by the Resistance and captured. Seen by the Resistance in Smaal's house, Rachel is captured as well. Imprisoned, Rachel endures horrific abuse before being liberated by Hans and a Canadian officer. Muntze proves less lucky. Returned to his old office, now being used by Canadian troops, Muntze finds the Canadian officers working with Kauntner. Far from defeated, Kauntner appears to retain significant power through the Canadians. Producing Muntze's death warrant, Kauntner persuades the Canadian officers to allow him to have Muntze executed, citing British Military law requiring a defeated enemy be permitted to discipline its own troops. Muntze is almost immediately executed by firing squad.

Lauding Hans as a resistance hero, and lured by chocolate he's received from allied officers, a crowd of jubilant Dutch follows his jeep as he takes Rachel to his home. There he shows her the recovered loot, a fortune in gold, jewels and cash. Learning of Muntze's death, Rachel collapses in grief. Hans gives her something to calm her down. Too late, Rachel realizes that Akkermans has injected her with insulin, leaving her to die as he greets a joyful crowd below. Slipping into unconsciousness, Rachel grabs some of Hans's chocolate bars to prevent insulin shock. While Hans is being cheered by a joyous crowd on his balcony, Rachel appears from behind him and jumps off the balcony into the crowd. Escaping, she reaches Canadian officers who bring her to Kuipers. Using the Black Book, Rachel and a Canadian officer successfully convince a grieving Kuipers of her innocence and Akkermans's guilt. The black book - with Smaal's notes - proves all too convincing, documenting wealthy Jews seeking to escape from the Germans. Hans himself had been arrested by the Gestapo, released officially due to lack of evidence, but in fact because he had made a deal with Franken. Kuipers and Rachel figure out that Hans is trying to get away in a coffin, taking with him the riches stolen from murdered Jews. They track him down and seal the coffin suffocating him. As they wait for Hans to die, Kuipers and Rachel calmly debate what to do with Hans's stolen treasure.

In the epilogue Rachel is living on a kibbutz in Israel, which was funded with the money, jewels, and other articles stolen from the Jews, where she works as a school teacher. Suddenly, shooting and the sound of jet aircraft is heard in the background - the Suez Crisis has begun.

== Novelization ==
The novel was written by Laurens Abbink Spaink and editor Erik Brus in two and a half months. The story is based on the screenplay written by Paul Verhoeven and Gerard Soeteman. When writer Laurens Abbink Spaink was asked in NRC Handelsblad whether the book is just a commercial product or also a literary work, he answers: "Black Book is a literary thriller. Its form is in between the typical American novelization, describing only what the camera sees, and a literary novel. The novelization adds something to the film. I gave Rachel Stein a past, memories and a house. In the film she had no personal space."

== Reception ==
Herman Franke writes positively about the novel in de Volkskrant: "The novel Black Book thoroughly puts into words what the film shows you. In black and white is confirmed what you half missed in the crisscross of story lines while you were watching: the piano is played by the left hand and people are tortured by the right hand, monsters can appear as soft people, and justice is easily off the right track. I have read the book as the bleak minutes of the chaotic massacre I saw in full colour. It made the film more immoral, and better."
