= Blue Book (United States Marine Corps) =

Annual officer lineal precedence list

Marine Corps Bulletin 1400 (MCBul 1400, commonly called the Blue Book) documents lineal precedence and seniority information on officers in the U.S. Marine Corps and Marine Forces Reserve. It is published annually by the U.S. Marine Corps' Deputy Commandant, Manpower and Reserve Affairs. In addition to determining seniority among officers, it is also used to determine promotion eligibility.
