= Purple Book =

Purple Book may refer to:

- The Purple Book (Labour Party), a collection of essays by Labour politicians
- Compendium of Macromolecular Nomenclature, published by IUPAC
- Purple Book, one of the Rainbow Books, defining the double-density compact disc standard
