= Blue paper =

Paper intended for artists

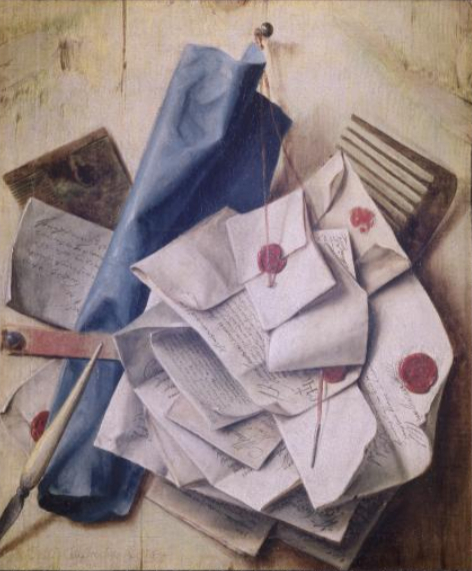
Cornelis Norbertus Gijsbrechts, Trompe l'oeil with letters and a roll of blue paper

Blue paper is a blue-dyed rag paper, historically used as a support for drawings and prints. The earliest extant mention of blue paper dates from a 1389 Bolognese statute. The rags were processed into paper in so-called paper mills. Artists were drawing on blue paper by the 15th century.

== Description ==
Blue paper (known in Italian as carta azzurra, carta cerulea, and carta turchina) is a blue-dyed rag paper. It was historically used as a support for drawings and prints. With its inherent middle tone, blue paper is a particularly effective material for rendering the effects of three-dimensionality on a two dimensional surface. This effect is created through the use of light and dark drawing materials, like chalk, charcoal, ink, and white heightening, on blue paper.

== History ==
Paper production can be traced back to China around 100 CE, arriving in Spain and then Italy via the Middle East around 1100. European rag paper differs from Asian paper in that the pulp is composed mainly of processed rags rather than of plant fibers. The earliest extant mention of blue paper dates from a 1389 Bolognese statute that refers to paper size, quality, weight, and price.

== Production ==
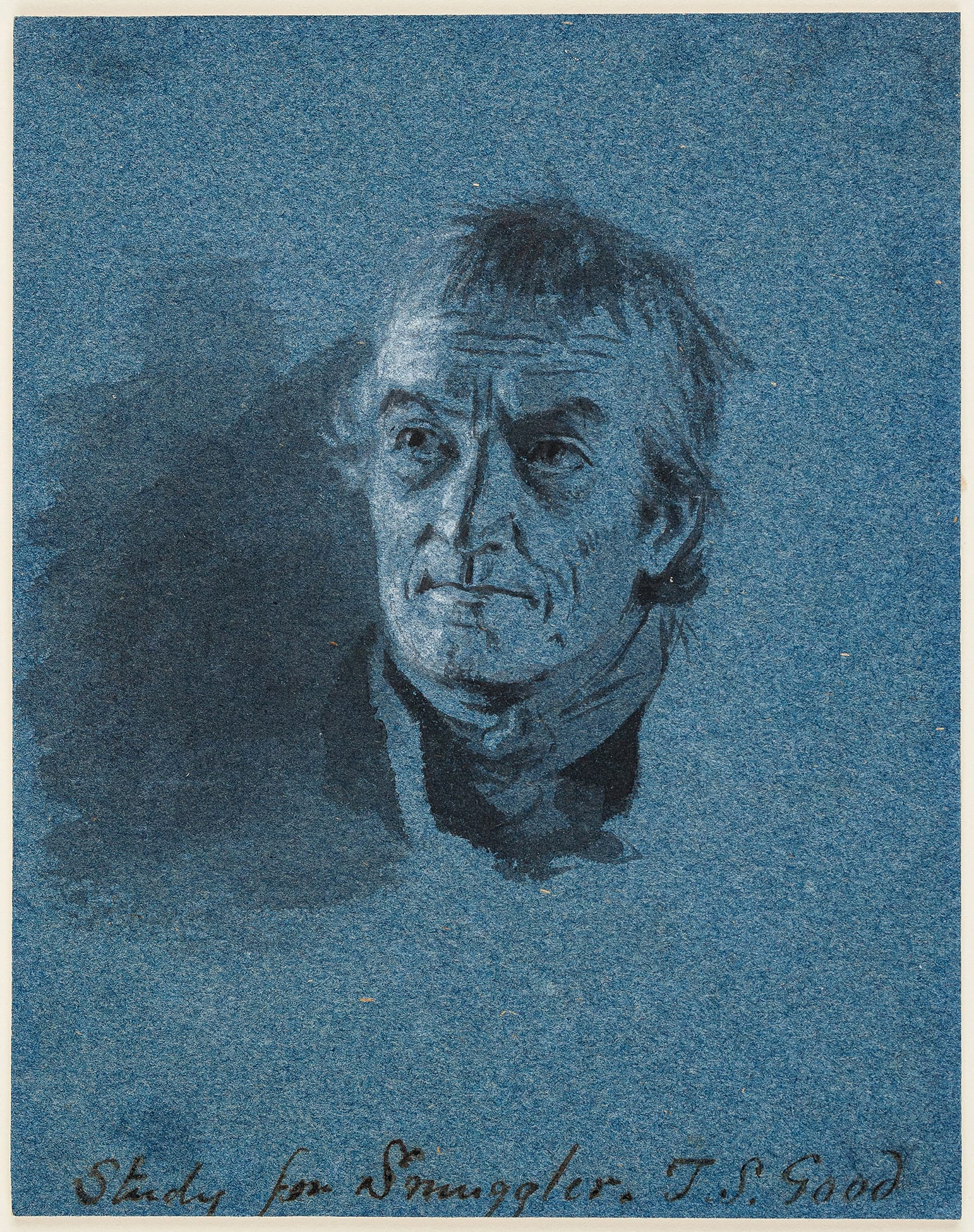
Thomas Sword Good, Study for Smuggler, pencil, ink and gouache on blue paper, before 1873

The rags were processed into paper in so-called paper mills. The working steps were subject to a strict hierarchy: The rags sold to the paper mill by rag pickers were first sorted by workers, often women and children. The rags were stamped and mixed into paper pulp in the next step. The pulp was removed with sieves and placed as a freshly laid sheet on a felt base in the first drying process (couching).

Sorting the rags was a time-consuming process carried out meticulously for high-quality writing papers. This was not necessarily the case for coarser wrapping paper. As work clothing in many regions consisted mainly of blue textiles, rag fibers were often already blue. Further, neither woad nor indigo, the most common blue colorants, require a mordant or substance to fix the dye and were dark enough to cover stains. Brown and grey papers were also produced during this period. The paper pulp for these less refined papers was stamped less thoroughly. Unlike white papers, they were often not bleached and were not treated with starch, as they did not need to be resistant to a quill.

== Art ==
Until the 18th century, there was no paper production specifically or exclusively for artistic works. However, artists were already drawing on blue paper in the 15th century. Towards the end of the 15th century, blue paper was used as a support for letterpress printing and for printmaking. The blue color provided a unique starting point for modeling light and shadow compared to the white paper. This is because the artist usually began with a dark drawing instrument, such as a pen or brush dipped in ink, charcoal, or chalk. These dark lines or traces are tonally closer to the colored paper than the lighter white paper. This allows white as a point of contrast, with modeling the highlights with lead or opaque white as an additional step. This step is not trivial, providing a new opportunity to differentiate the modeling. White paper was sometimes colored with an opaque ground layer to achieve this differentiation. These drawn studies of light and shadow provided preparation for the more nuanced execution of such modeling in colored painting. However, such drawings on colored paper with their more elaborate modeling (compared, for example, too many chalk or pen and ink drawings on white paper) had a special aesthetic effect. Collectors prized them early on.

The earliest drawings on blue paper date back to the early 15th century in Northern Italy. Beginning in the 15th century, a proliferation took place in Venice. North of the Alps, blue paper was used for drawings from the early 16th century: First by Albrecht Dürer, then demonstrably by Hans Burgkmair and Jörg Breu. In the Netherlands, the material became as a chosen support beginning in the 1630s. The Dutch used logwood, made available by through the West Indies Company, as a blue colourant. Logwood-dyed rags were processed into paper pulp or the dye was introduced directly into the vat, a process credited to Dutch papermakers. For pastel painting, which emerged in the late 17th century, blue paper was used particularly frequently as a support material alongside parchment, silk, canvas, wood, and copper.

== Literature ==
- Irene Brückle, The Historical Manufacture of Blue-Coloured Paper, in: The Paper Conservator, 1993, vol. 17, pp. 20–31.
- Irene Brückle, Blue-colored paper in drawings, in: Drawing, 1993, vol. 14, no. 4, pp. 73–77.
- Peter Bower, Blues and Browns and Drabs: The Evolution of Colored Papers, in: Harriet K. Stratis and Britt Salvesen (eds.), The Broad Spectrum. Studies in the Materials, Techniques, and Conservation of Color on Paper, London 2002, pp. 42–48, 978-1873132579.
- Iris Brahms, Schnelligkeit als visuelle und taktile Erfahrung. Zum chiaroscuro in der venezianischen Zeichenpraxis, in: Magdalena Bushart and Henrike Haug (eds.), Technische Innovationen und künstlerisches Wissen in der Frühen Neuzeit, Interdependenzen: Die Künste und ihre Techniken, vol. 1, Cologne/Weimar/Berlin 2015, pp. 205–229, pl. 28-30, 978-3412210908.
- Thea Burns, Making Space for the Materiality of Blue Paper, in: Claude Laroque (eds.), Histoire du papier et de la papeterie, Actualités de la recherche - II, Paris, site de l'HiCSA, 2020, pp. 70–84. Last accessed: 29.10.2024.
- Alexa McCarthy, Govert Flinck's Figure Studies on Blue Paper: The Role of Materials in Stylistic Development, in: Iris Brahms (ed.), Gezeichnete Evidentia: Zeichnungen auf kolorierten Papieren in Süd und Nord von 1400 bis 1700, Berlin / Boston 2021, pp. 197–216, 978-3110634495.
- Iris Brahms, Textur, Transparenz und Täuschung. Blaue Papiere und Schriftquellen in Pastellen des 18. Jahrhunderts, in: Zeitschrift für Kunstgeschichte, 2023, vol. 86, no. 1, pp. 68–99, doi:10.1515/ZKG-2023-1006.
- Iris Brahms, Ecologies of Blue Paper. Dürer and Beyond, in: 21: Inquiries into Art, History and the Visual, 2023, no. 4, pp. 603–638, doi:10.11588/xxi.2023.4.
- Iris Brahms, The Carracci's Reflection of Blue. Carte Azzurre in Annibale and Agostino's Drawings and their Criticism of Vasari's Doctrine, in: Logbuch Wissensgeschichte des SFB Episteme in Bewegung, Freie Universität Berlin, 22.03.2024, Iris Brahms. Last accessed: 23.10.2024.
- Alexa McCarthy, Legacies on Blue Paper: Drawing in the Bassano, Caliari, and Tintoretto Family Workshops, in: Thomas Dalla Costa and Maria Aresin (eds.), Venetian Disegno: New Frontiers, London 2024, pp. 74–84, 978-1915401007.
- Edina Adam and Michelle Sullivan (eds.), Drawing on Blue: European Drawings on Blue Paper, 1400s-1700s, Los Angeles 2024, 978-1606068670.
- Leila Sauvage and Marie-Noëlle Grison, The handmade blue paper project: Application of experimental archaeology methods to study the materiality of Dutch blue paper (1650-1750), in: Jaarboek voor Nederlandse Boekgeschiedenis, 2023, vol. 30, pp. 64–90. doi:10.5117/JNB2023.004.GRIS. Last accessed: 30.10.2024.
- Alexa McCarthy, Laura Moretti, Paolo Sachet (eds.), Venice in Blue: The Use of carta azzurra in the Artist's Studio and in the Printer's Workshop, ca. 1500–50 (Testi e fonti per la storia della grafica), Florence 2024, 978-8822269096.
