= Thomas Sword Good =

English painter

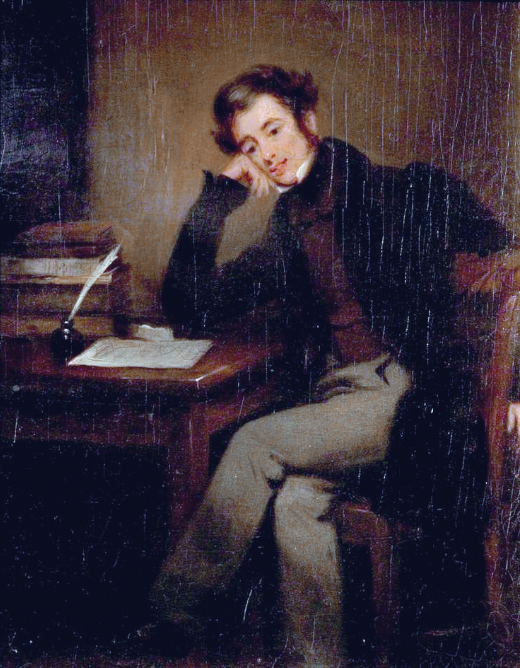
Self-portrait

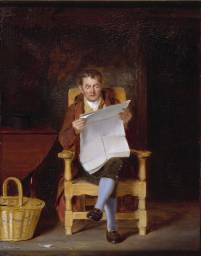
A Man Reading, 1827.

Thomas Sword Good (2 December 1789 – 15 April 1872) was a British painter, known for genre works.

== Life ==
Good was born at Berwick-upon-Tweed, 2 December 1789, and spent most of his life there. He was brought up as a house-painter, but in course of time began to execute portrait. From this he passed to genre painting, and between 1820 and 1834 exhibited at the principal London exhibitions. He stopped painting in the mid-1830s.

He died in his house at 20 Quay Walls of his native town, 15 April 1872.

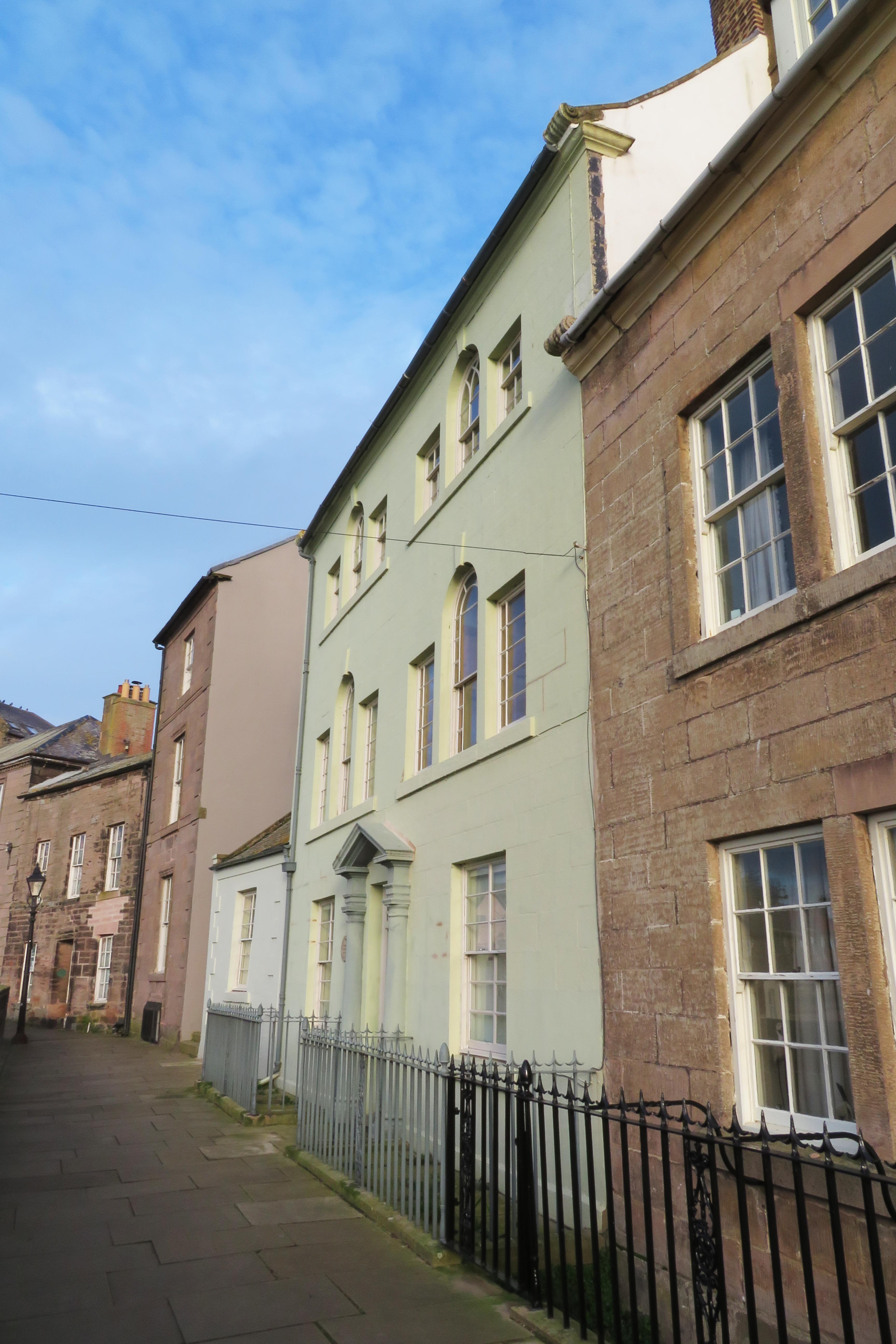
the house of artist thomas Sword Good, in Berwick upon Tweed

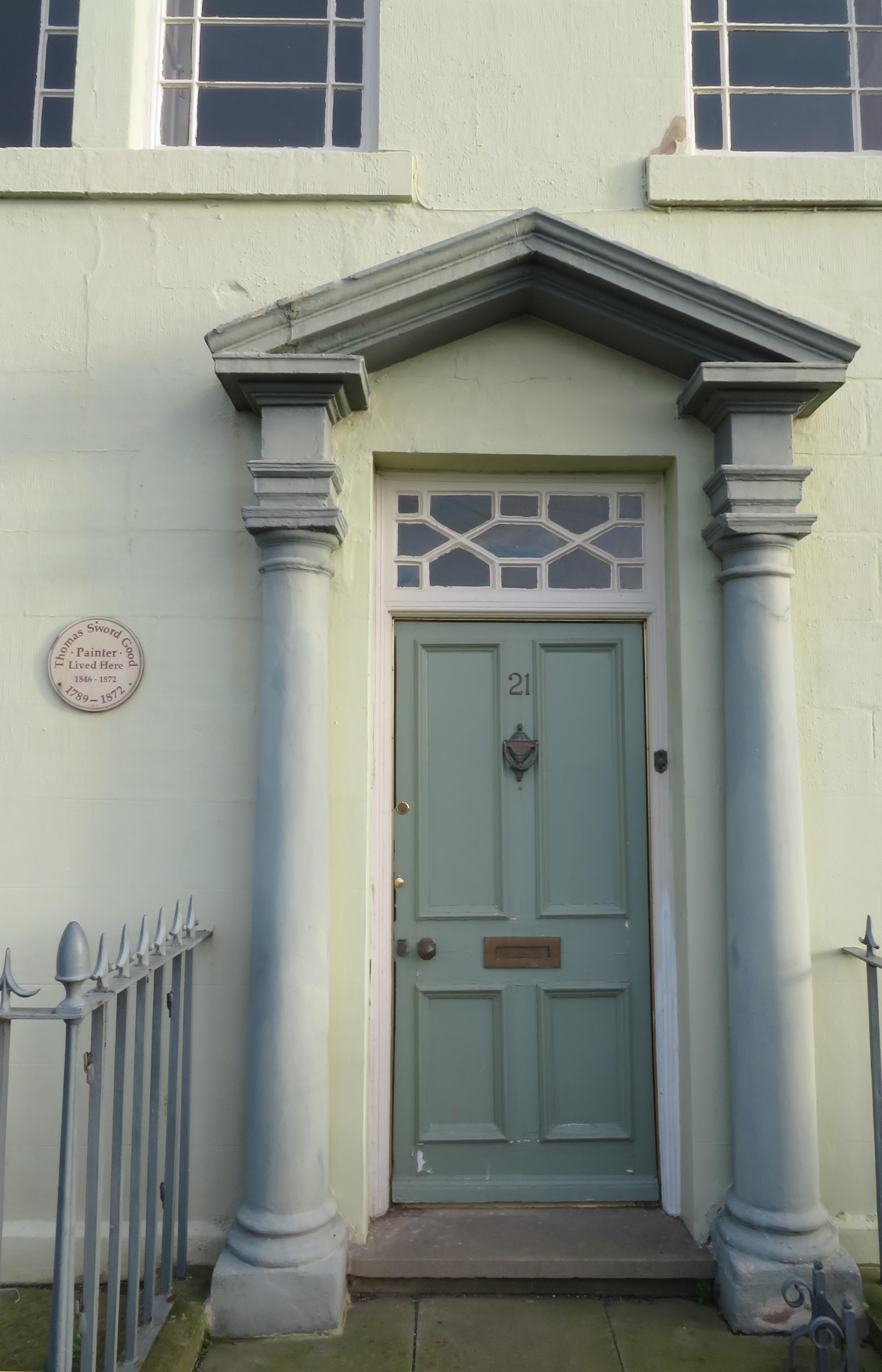
the house of artist thomas Sword Good, in Berwick upon Tweed

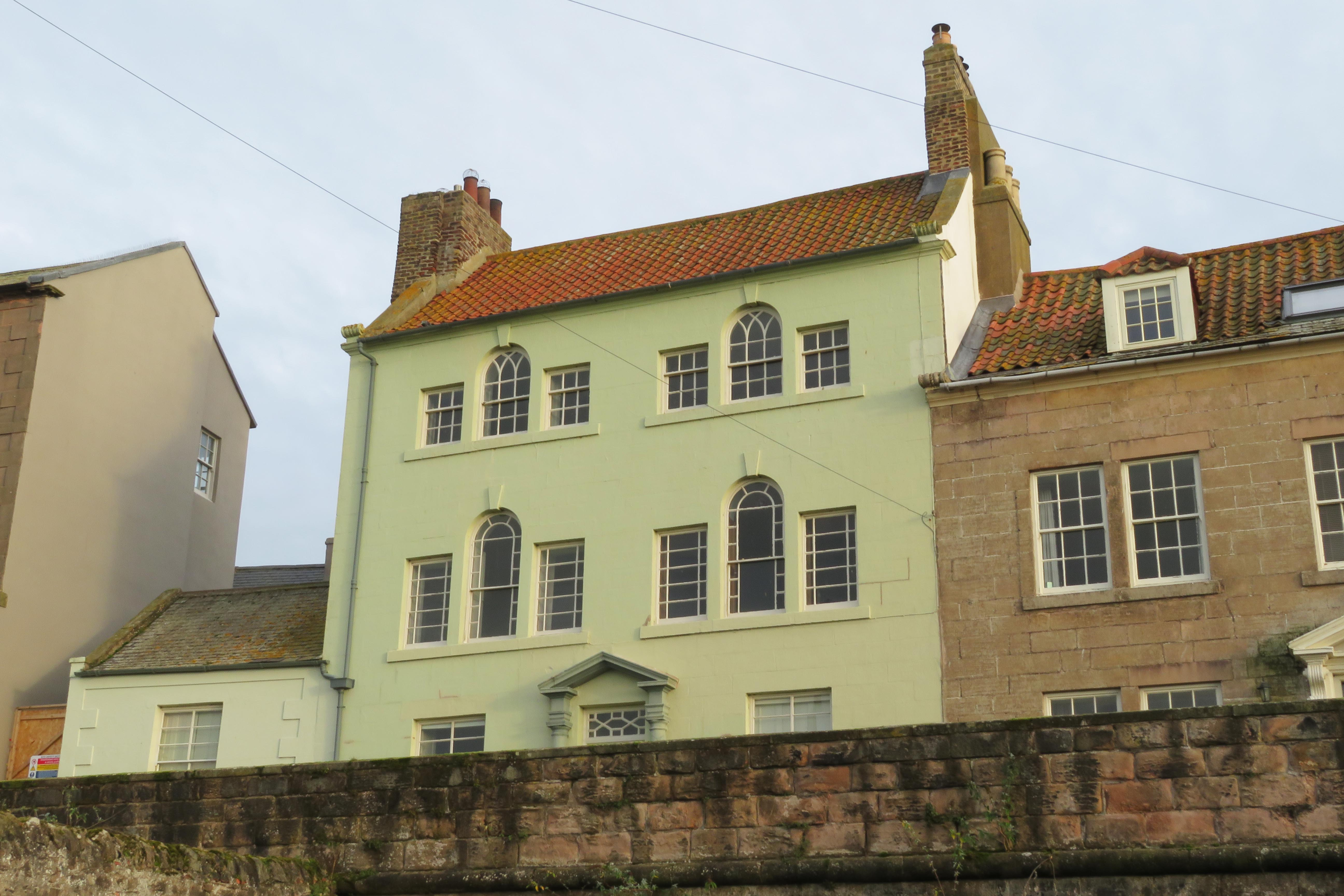
the house of artist Thomas Sword Good in Berwick upon Tweed

Little is known of his life, but he visited London and David Wilkie, to whose school of painting his works belong.

== Works ==
To the Royal Academy he sent in 1820 'A Scotch Shepherd;' 'in 1821 'Music' and 'A Man with a Hare;' in 1822 (the year in which Wilkie's 'Chelsea Pensioners' was exhibited) 'Two Old Men (still living) who fought at the Battle of Minden,' later in the possession of Frederick Locker-Lampson. To the same year belongs 'An Old Northumbrian Piper.' In 1823 he exhibited 'Practice' (probably the barber's apprentice shaving a sheep's head, engraved in mezzotint by W. Morrison); 1824, 'Rummaging an Old Wardrobe;' 1825, 'Girl and Boy' and 'Smugglers Resting;' 1826, 'A Study of Figures;' 1827, 'Fishermen;' 1828, 'Interior, with Figures;' 1829, 'Coast Scene, with Fishermen' and 'Idlers;' 1830, 'The Truant' and 'Merry Cottagers;' 1831, 'Medicine:' 1832, 'Coast Scene, with a Fisherman' (acquired by the National Gallery); and 1833, 'The Industrious Mother.' Besides these, he sent forty-three pictures to the British Institution and two to the Suffolk Street Gallery, making a total of sixty-four works up to 1834.

Two works ('No News' and 'Study of a Boy') were bequeathed to the National Gallery in 1874 by the painter's widow, Mary Evans Good, to whom he had been married in 1839. There are also several examples of Good's art in the Fitzwilliam Museum at Cambridge, and there was a portrait of the artist's friend Thomas Bewick in the Museum of the Newcastle Natural History Society. Good's works were collected by J. W. Barnes of Durham: oils, water-colours, drawings, and etchings, including a self-portrait of the artist by himself.
