= Personal Child Health Record =

British personal health record

A Personal Child Health Record (PCHR) is a form of personal health record of the United Kingdom that records a child's growth, development, and use of health services.

== Paper-based record ==
Front cover of a PCHR from the late 1990s.

The paper based child health record as used by the UK National Health Service is popularly known as the "Red Book." It is given to the parents on or just after the birth of their child, and is used by parents to record standard health details such as height and weight as well as developmental milestones such as first words and first time walking. As the record has matured, additional information has been added in the form of inserts to aid parents with certain medical conditions, such as Down syndrome. There are also sections that are typically completed by the child's GP or health visitor.

There are also additional updates from organisations such as the World Health Organization for growth chart updates

The Scottish National Personal Child Health Record is available for download if you have a child born before January 2010. The UK-WHO Growth Charts are also available for download. EEPDwiki has links to more resources and examples of UK hand-held child health records.

A number of other countries have similar paper-based systems for sharing information between health professionals and parents. The Japanese introduced a maternal and child paper record (Boshi techo) in 1947 with the aim of reducing perinatal mortality. The current form of Mother Child Health Handbook (Boshi kenko techo) was introduced in 1966 and has been adapted for use in at least 20 countries worldwide.

== Electronic record ==
NHS Digital and NHS England, under their National Events Management Service, now allow parents and NHS staff to securely receive information about a child’s health digitally. The service is being adopted by NHS organisations nationally to help further progress the availability of a digital Red Book for new parents.

A couple of tech companies are offering these NHS-linked smart digital versions of the Red Book. The user can use these mobile and desktop apps to connect to their NHS accounts and carry out a slew of GP-related tasks with just a few clicks. These apps also offer services like child health monitoring, growth milestone tracking, dental health trackers, appointment bookings, prescription ordering and jab reminders.

The health records are synced with the NHS data in real-time, eliminating the cumbersome need to store and safeguard reports, prescriptions, and other documents.

The tech space has solutions from Nurturey (under the product name PinkBook), Onoco (Onoco mobile app), Sitekit, and other companies.
