= Automobile Blue Book =

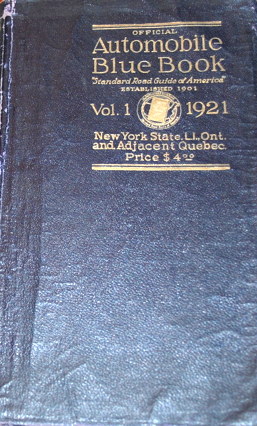
Cover of Automobile Blue Book volume 1, 1921

The Automobile Blue Book was an American series of road guides for motoring travelers in the United States and Canada published between 1901 and 1929. It was best known for its point-to-point road directions at a time when numbered routes generally did not exist (Wisconsin became the first state to number its highways in 1918).

== Origin ==
Hartford automobile businessman and enthusiast Charles Howard Gillette initiated the series. It was first published in 1901, covering 62 routes across the American Northeastern metropolitan areas of Boston, New York, Philadelphia, Baltimore, and Washington, D.C. Gillette had originally intended the book to focus on routes that connected automobile supply stations, and included extensive reference sections on automobile repair and maintenance, but the book would find its most success focusing on routes between cities.

== Growth ==
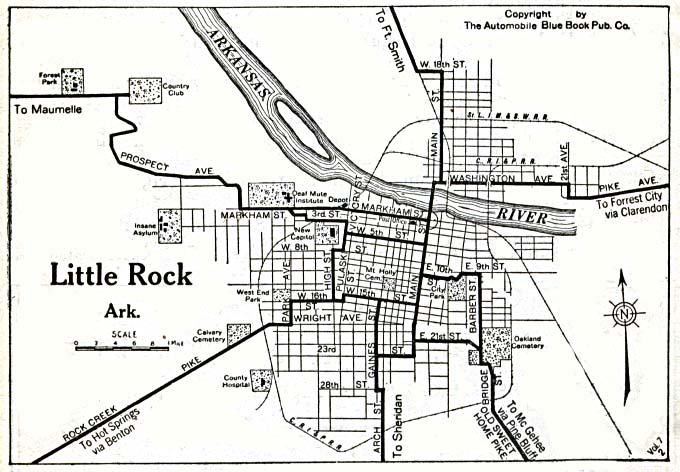
Map of Little Rock, Arkansas from the 1920 Automobile Blue Book.

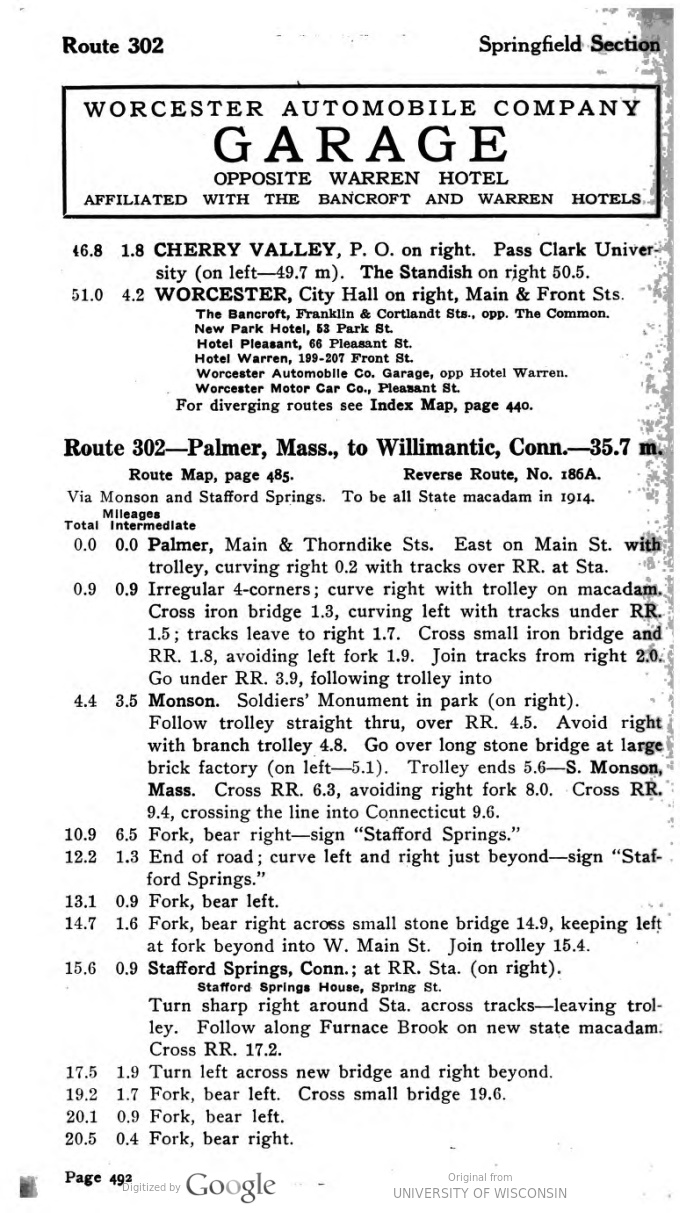
Route from 1914 Automobile Blue Book, showing a garage advertisement and start of route between Palmer, Massachusetts and Willimantic, Connecticut

The Automobile Blue Book was published annually as a single volume through 1906, expanding to 3 volumes in 1907, but would not cover the full United States until 1915. In 1906 the American Automobile Association (AAA), of which Gillette was Secretary, officially sponsored the book, dramatically increasing its circulation as the book was sold to association members at a discount. The 1907 edition was the first to include maps of cities and routes, while also removing the automobile maintenance sections in favor of more space for advertisements related to automobiles and touring. Readers could also find information on trip planning and state road laws. By the 1910s, it became "the standard publication" of its type.

Volumes of the Automobile Blue Book published before 1927 were primarily designed to provide routes between cities, focusing on turn-by-turn directions, with supplemental maps providing context and showing connections. Directions were not necessarily intended to be the shortest or fastest connection between each city, but to provide interesting scenery and opportunities for rest and maintenance along the route. Each route was listed twice – once in each direction. This emphasis on providing separate routes for each city connection led to volumes often containing more than 800 pages to describe the hundreds of routes contained within. These routes relied primarily on landmarks and right or left turn descriptions, while avoiding compass directions like north or east, which made the directions difficult to use if travelers left the designated route or a landmark was destroyed. These turn-by-turn directions may have been a necessity however, as roads at the time were designed for local – not intercity – travel, limiting long stretches of continuous roads, and meaning "anyone wishing to travel cross-country by automobile was forced to make hundreds of turns onto hundreds of different roads" that were impractical to represent visually on a map. In addition, the lack of many signs caused some of the intersections to be shown by pictures, with directions appended.

== Production and development ==
The routes used in the Blue Book were initially developed by amateur "pathfinders" who used their knowledge of local roads to compile the listed routes. Early pathfinders were actually bicyclists, but eventually automobile clubs – especially those of the AAA – became the major source of routes compiled by the Blue Book. By 1907 the Blue Book had its own fleet of cars and professional pathfinders working in teams of two to create and update routes.

== Audience and advertisements ==
Early editions of the book were aimed primarily at wealthy Americans traveling for leisure, as only the rich could afford an automobile in the early 1900s. With the Ford Motor Company's release of the Model T in 1908, the article's advertisements evidenced a shift toward a larger middle class market as touring in automobiles became more accessible. The book's reliance on mileages as a navigational aid created difficulty at a time when many automobiles were not sold with odometers or speedometers included, but provided an opportunity for the book to regularly advertise after-market versions in its volumes. As the Blue Book grew to include hundreds of advertisements for hotels, restaurants, garages, and auto dealers in each volume, some retailers hung signs announcing themselves as an "Official Automobile Blue Book Garage" or an "Official Automobile Blue Book Hotel".

== Decline ==
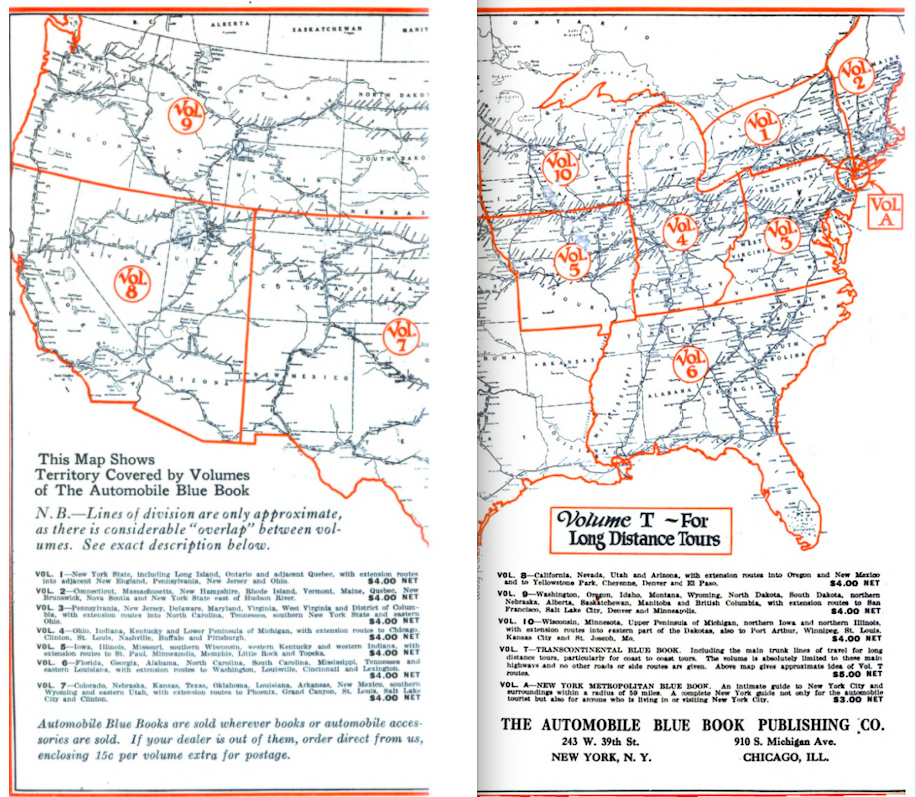
Index map of volumes in the Automobile Blue Book series, 1921

After reaching peak size by publishing 12 volumes in 1921, publishers consolidated to 4 volumes in 1922, removing routes, shrinking fonts, and increasing use of abbreviations over the years. As a number of competing map services arose, including Rand McNally, the Blue Book suffered declining sales, exacerbated when AAA stopped distributing the books in 1926. In response, the 1927 edition was dramatically reformatted, with an emphasis on maps and the elimination of turn-by-turn route directions as the increasing development of highways (and especially numbered routes) made map-based navigation more practical. The last Blue Book was published in 1929.
