= Black Book of the Exchequer =

The Black Book of the Exchequer (Latin: Liber Niger Scaccarii) or Little Black Book (Liber Niger Parvus) is a collection of documents compiled for the English Exchequer early in the reign of King John (1199–1216) and now preserved in manuscript in the Public Record Office. It is usually attributed to Alexander of Swerford, who later compiled the Red Book of the Exchequer, including much of the same material.

The Black Book contains the will of Henry I, several treaties, papal bulls, the Cartae Baronum, an account of the royal household in Henry II's reign and a few other matters. The book illustrates the feudal arrangement of England, the distribution of knights' fees and serjeanties, the obligation of military service and the like topics. It was first printed in 1728 by Thomas Hearne.

The Black Book of the Exchequer should not be confused with the Black Book of the Treasury of Receipt, which contains the Dialogus de Scaccario.
