= International Cataloguing Standards Committee =

Horse racing organization

The International Cataloguing Standards Committee (ICSC), formed in 1981, is an organization in Thoroughbred racing which aims at achieving uniformity of cataloguing standards throughout the world during the internationalization of thoroughbred breeding, racing, and marketing.

== Composition ==
The committee is made up of representatives of the racing authorities, breeders' organizations, and international auction houses of four major breeding and racing countries (England, France, Ireland, and the United States). The Organzicion Sudamericana de Fomento del Pura Sangre de Carrera (O.S.A.F.) of South America has had one representative since 1995 and the Asian Racing Conference has had one since 1996. The committee is making recommendations to the Society of International Thoroughbred Auctioneers.

== Objectives ==
The committee seeks to achieve uniformity by making International Cataloguing Standards the single most authoritative, comprehensive, practical, and accepted publication, in order to:

- To prevent discrepancies between countries in the criteria applied for black type races in sales catalogues
- To define more objective standards in the recognition of racing quality among the nations
- To prevent imbalances between countries in the designation of Group or Grade and black type races.

== History ==
In 1985 the committee set forth conditions under which a country could make the transition from Part II to Part I, and invited applications from those countries seeking to make this transition. In October, after careful evaluation of the various applications, the committee welcomed Argentina, Australia, Brazil, Chile, New Zealand, Peru, South Africa and Uruguay into Part I. The committee found:

- that racing in these countries is of sufficient stature in terms of number of horses competing, number of races contested, and purse monies distributed to justify their classification as being among the world's major racing countries;
- that the number and percentage of races given group, graded or "black type" status in these countries is consistent with the pattern of racing in them without being disproportionate to the ration of such races in the countries already in Part I; and
- that the group or graded and listed races in these countries are, in fact, the highest class races contested within them.

Nonetheless, Uruguay was demoted to Part II again in 1992.
