= Green Book =

Green Book or The Green Book may refer to:

== Film ==
- Green Book (film), a 2018 drama film, directed by Peter Farrelly
- The Green Book: Guide to Freedom, a 2019 documentary by Yoruba Richen

== Literature ==
=== Fiction ===
- Green Book, the title of the main section in Arthur Machen's short story "The White People"
- The Green Book, an off-Broadway play by Will Scheffer
- The Green Book, a children's book by Jill Paton Walsh

=== Non-fiction ===
- Green Book (CD-interactive standard)
- Green Book (Tibetan document), a document issued by the Central Tibetan Administration to Tibetans living outside Tibet
- Green Book an 1880-1883 ship's register, one of the progenitors, along with the Red Book of Lloyd's Register
- A Policy on Geometric Design of Highways and Streets, or The Green Book, a publication by the American Association of State Highway and Transportation Officials on roadway and street engineering design
- Green Books, the multi-volume Official History of the United States Army in World War II
- Quantities, Units and Symbols in Physical Chemistry, also called the "IUPAC Green Book", a compilation of terms and symbols widely used in the field of physical chemistry
- The Control of Language: A Critical Approach to Reading and Writing (King & Ketley, 1939), anonymized as "The Green Book" by C S Lewis in The Abolition of Man
- The Green Book (BBC) or BBC Variety Programmes Policy Guide For Writers and Producers
- The Green Book (immunisation guidance, UK) United Kingdom guidance on vaccines and vaccination schedules
- The Green Book (IRA), an Irish Republican Army training manual
- The Green Book (Gaddafi), a book setting out the political philosophy of Muammar Gaddafi
- The Green Book, UK Treasury guidance on appraisal and evaluation of central government projects
- The Green Book: A Guide to Members' Allowances, a publication of the House of Commons of the United Kingdom
- The Green Book Magazine, an American theater and women's interest magazine in the early 20th century
- The Little Green Book, a collection of fatwa issued by Ayatollah Ruhollah Khomeini
- The Negro Motorist Green Book, a 1936–1966 segregation-era travel guide originally published by Victor H. Green
- The Land and the Nation, known as The Green Book, a 1925 British Liberal Party publication; see David Lloyd George § Liberal leader
- The Green Book, volume 1 (1961) of British collection Carols for Choirs
- The Civil Court Practice, known as The Green Book, a guide to civil procedure in England and Wales

== Other uses ==
- The Green Book (album), a 2003 album by Twiztid
- Green Book, a Coloured Book protocol for linking terminals across a network

== See also ==
- Greenbook, a publication of the Federal Reserve Board containing projections for the economy of the United States
- Green Booklet, or Word list of the Dutch language
- Green paper, a tentative government report of a proposal
- The Green Fairy Book (1892), a book by Andrew Lang
